= Mount Everest in 2018 =

Year on the mountain

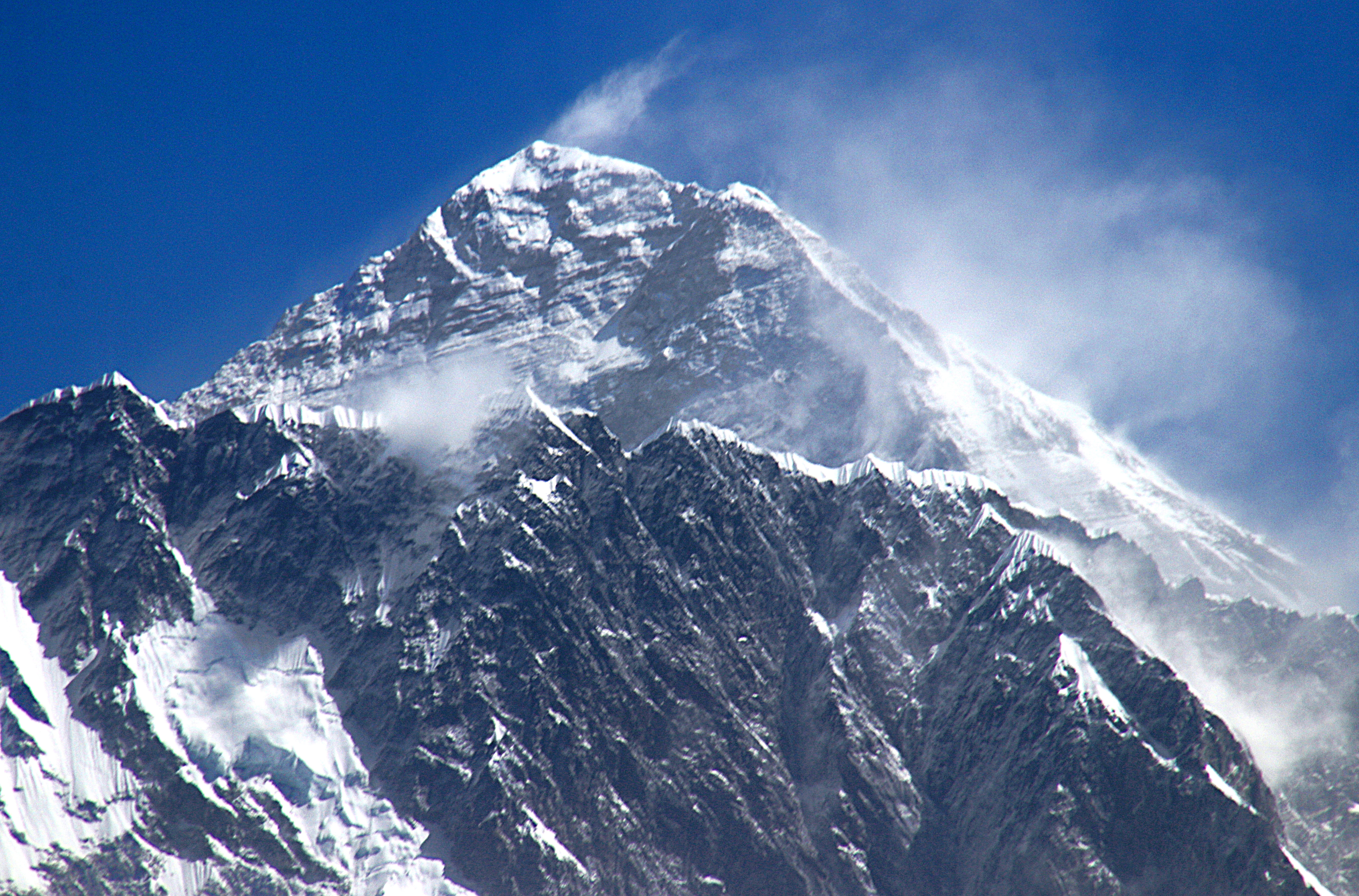
Image of the Everest summit (March 2018)

2018 fatalities
Fatalities	Nationality
Damai Sarki Sherpa*	Nepal
Pasang Norba Sherpa	Nepal
Nobukazu Kuriki	Japan
Lam Babu Sherpa	Nepal
Gjeorgi Petkov	Macedonia
Rustem Amirov	Russia
*Died helping to rescue another climber

A total of 807 climbers summited Mount Everest in 2018. The year saw an unusually long weather window of 11 days straight of calm, which reduced crowding at the high base camps. The number of people reaching the summit was the highest in recorded history, beating the previous year's total by over 150.

== Overview ==
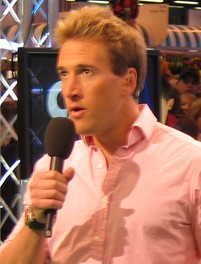
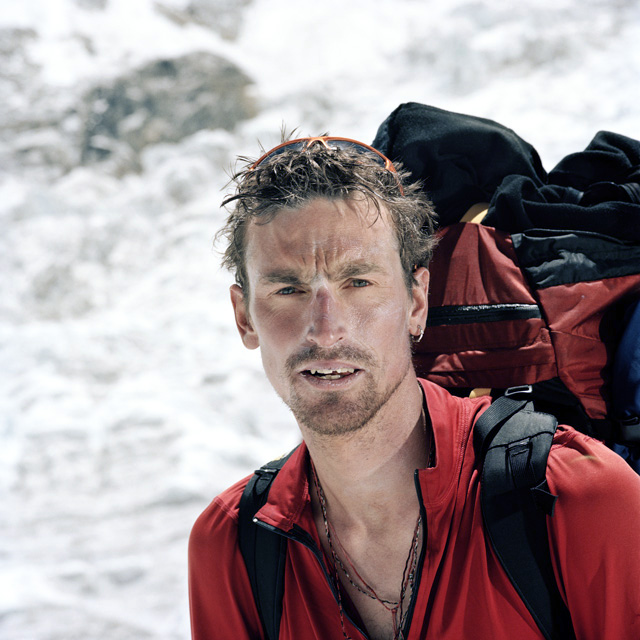
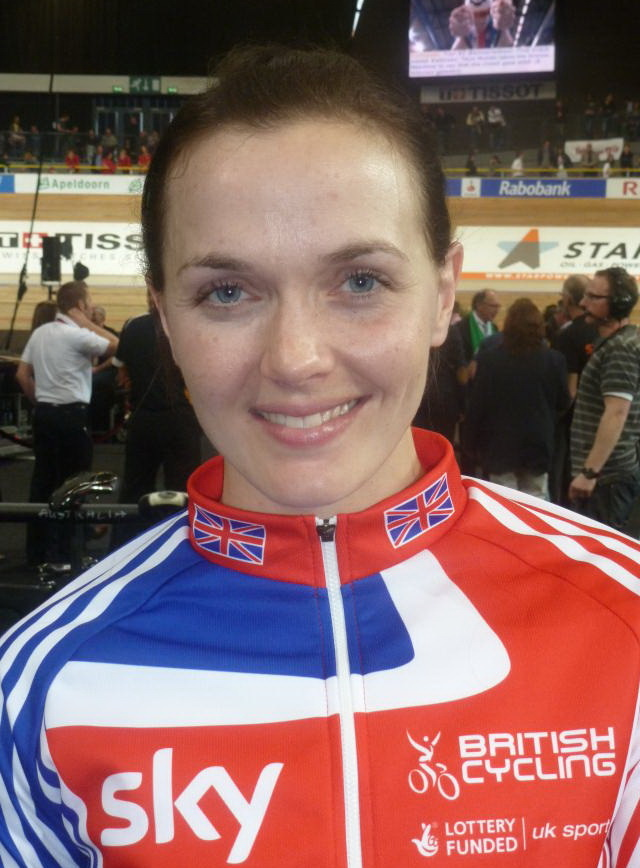
Ben Fogle, Kenton Cool, Victoria Pendleton

A total of 807 climbers summited Mount Everest in 2018, including 563 on the Nepal side and 240 from the Chinese Tibet side. This broke the previous record for total summits in year from which was 667 in 2013, and one factor that aided in this was an especially long and clear weather window of 11 days during the critical spring climbing season.

Among those reaching the summit was a 70-year-old double amputee, who undertook his climb after winning a court case in the Nepali Supreme Court. There were no major disasters, but seven climbers died in various situations including several Sherpas as well as international climbers. Although record numbers of climbers reached the summit, climbers who had reached the summit in expeditions in the 1980s lamented the crowding, feces, and cost.

Himalayan record keeper Elizabeth Hawley died in late January 2018. In 2018, Nepal announced plans to re-measure the height of Mount Everest, which is typically recognized as being 29,029 feet (8,848 m), although measurements of 29,022 feet (8,846 m) and 29,035 feet (8,850 m) have been reported.

Another goal in 2018 of many organizations was to remove trash from the mountain and nature areas. Various incentives for Sherpas—such as $2 per kilo of trash removed, and up to $500 for returning a discarded oxygen bottle—resulted in cleaned-up trails.

The season brought additional confirmation that the Hillary Step had been altered by seismic activity, with climbers describing it as a slope. It had been a 40-foot (12-meter) climbing face below the summit, with reports in previous years that the amount of snow made it difficult to determine what had happened. In particular, one large stone of about five meters in height was reported to have disappeared.

Nepal honoured several mountain climbers, including those that summited Everest in the 1970s and went on to conduct humanitarian projects in the impoverished land-locked country. Climbers honoured by Nepal included Wolfgang Nairz, Oswald Ölz, Peter Habeler, Raimund Magreiter, Robert Schauer, Hanns Schell and Helmuth Hagner. Nepal also honored Reinhold Messner and Peter Habeler in April 2018, for their 1978 climb of Mount Everest.

A gourmet pop-up restaurant at Everest Base camp was planned this year, making international news. A group of chefs planned a seven course meal featuring local ingredients. The chef said that he planned to use the sous-vide style of cooking on the expedition.

On 13 May 2018, a group of Nepali climbers reached the summit of Mount Everest, the first of the season. This group paves the way for more climbers to reach from the Nepal side of the mountain, and 346 permits were granted for this year in the climbing season which runs in the spring from April to the end of May. As of April 2018, about 350 climbing permits for tourists had been issued so far on the Nepal side. Another 180 climbers were said to be making a summit bid from the northern side, in China (Tibet region). This is the time when there are a few days of calm and good weather high on the mountain.

Some of the fatalities this season were Japanese climber Nobukazu Kuriki, who died on his 8th attempt. He had returned to make a summit attempt in 2015 despite losing nine of his fingers in an attempt to summit in 2012. Also, a climber from Macedonia was reported to have died on the mountain. By 19 May 2018, the Kathmandu Times reports that at least 277 climbers had summited Mount Everest. About five people were reported to have died or gone missing on the mountain by late May 2018, including Nobukazu Kuriki, Gjeorgi Petkov, Rustem Amirov, and Lama Babu Sherpa.

Among those that summited this year was a team led by Adrian Ballinger, including Neal Beidleman who survived the 1996 Mount Everest disaster and returned to summit this season. Record-breaking woman summiteer Lhakpa Sherpa summited Mount Everest again, making 2018 her ninth summit of Mount Everest, meanwhile Kami Rita Sherpa attained his 22nd summit in 2018, overtaking the previous maximum of 21 set by Apa Sherpa.

British climber Kenton Cool increased his summit tally to 13 in 2018, the most for the United Kingdom. Olympic Gold Medal winner Victoria Pendleton made a summit bid with Cool, but her summit bid had to be abandoned due to altitude sickness. One reason for this was that a weather window opened up earlier than expected, but her body was not taking in enough oxygen. Her partners Ben Fogle and Kenton Cool reached the summit on 16 May. This was televised and published as a book, as was the ascent and summit of Ant Middleton with Ed Wardle, taking place at the same time.

Some of the national record-makers for the year include Alyssa Azar, who became the youngest Australian to summit Mount Everest in 2016 when she was 19, and reached the summit again in 2018. The achievement also made her the youngest Australian to summit Mount Everest, to summit it twice, and youngest from both south and north sides of the mountain. A group of female journalists that climbed Everest as part of the Women Journalists Everest Expedition-2018 was awarded for their expedition by the Prime Minister of Nepal, in Kathmandu.

== Comparison ==
Years in review summary
Year	Summiteers	Reference(s)
2012	547	
2013	658	
2014	106	
2015	0	
2016	641	
2017	648	
2018	807	
2019	891	
2020	0	
2021	over 600	
2022	approx. 678	
2023	over 670	
2024	over 860	
2025		

== In the media ==
=== Television ===
- Extreme Everest (Parable, Channel 4, 2018) with Ant Middleton.
- Our Everest Challenge (ITV)/The Challenge:Everest (CNN) (CNN Vision, 2018) with Ben Fogle and Victoria Pendleton.

=== Books ===
- Up: My Life's Journey to the Top of Everest (Ben Fogle and Marina Fogle, William Collins, 2018) ISBN 978-0008319182
- The Fear Bubble: Harness Fear and live without limits (Ant Middleton, HarperCollins, 2019) ISBN 978-0008194680
