= 1974 French Mount Everest expedition =

Mountaineering expedition

On 9 September 1974, the West Ridge Direct on Mount Everest was attempted by a French expedition. It resulted in the deaths of six climbers in an avalanche on the way to the summit. These deaths took the total number of fatalities on the mountain to 36.

The team consisted of:

- Gérard Devouassoux;
- Claude Ancey (survived);
- Lhakpa (Sherpa);
- Sanu Wongal (Sherpa);
- Pemba Dorje (Sherpa);
- Nawang Lutuk (Sherpa);
- Nima Wangchu (Sherpa).

In comparison, six Sherpas died on 5 April 1970 due to an avalanche in the Khumbu Icefall (see 1970 Mount Everest disaster). Other bad years were 1982 and 1996, although none of these years claimed as many lives as were lost in the avalanches of 2014 and 2015.

== See also ==
- 1970 Mount Everest disaster
- List of 20th-century summiters of Mount Everest
- List of deaths on the Eight Thousanders
- List of people who died climbing Mount Everest
- List of Mount Everest expeditions
