= Mount Everest in 2016 =

Mount Everest climbing season

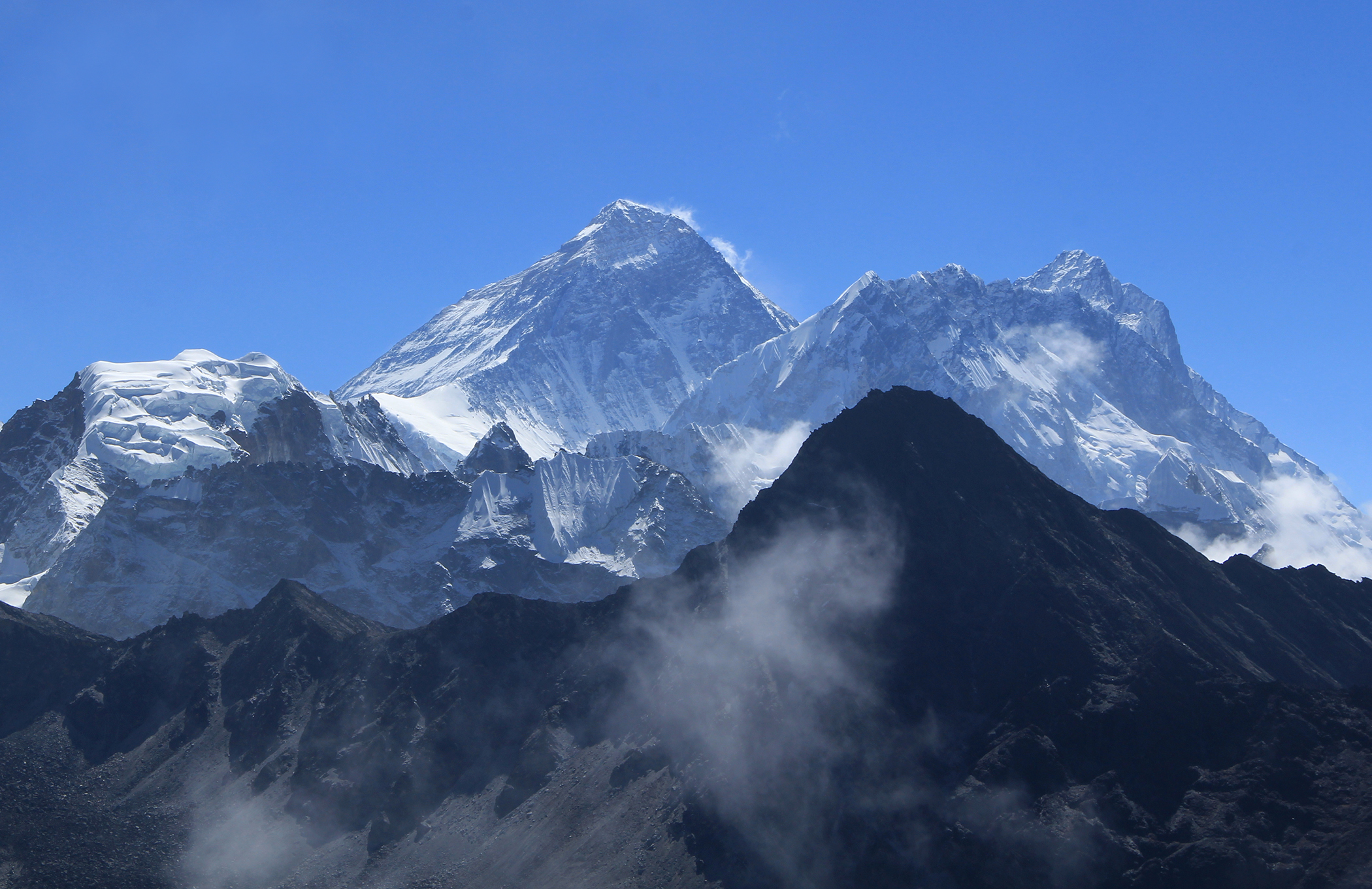
Mount Everest, May 2016, with Nuptse and Lhotse peaks to the upper right

Mount Everest in 2016 covers events about Mount Everest, the highest mountain on Earth located in Nepal and Chinese Tibet in Asia. It is a popular climbing destination for extreme high altitude climbers, with several hundred climbing each year despite various dangers.

== Summary ==
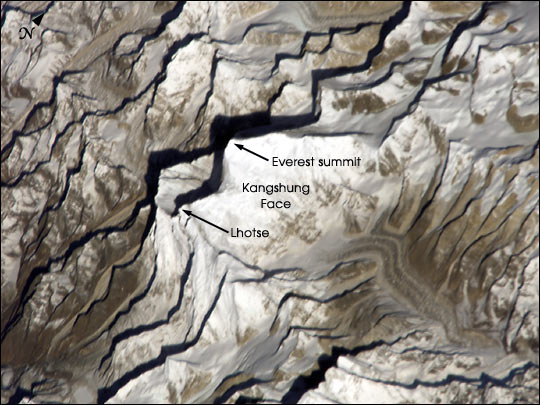
Mount Everest as seen from the ISS

The Nepal Department of Tourism said by June 2016 that about 456 people made it to the summit of Mount Everest, including 45 women. They noted some good summit windows, and on one day, 19 May 2016, 209 climbers made it to the summit. By 11 May 2016 the lines were fixed on the south side of Everest, after which several hundred climbers would make it up in the critical weather windows. Alan Arnette published his Everest report by year end, based on results for the now 93-year-old Elizabeth Hawley, which were released in December 2016. For 2016 her records indicate 641 made it to the summit early 2016.

Annual count of summiters
Year	Summiters	Reference(s)
2012	547	
2013	658	
2014	106	
2015	0	
2016	641	
2017	648	
2018	807	
2019	891	
2020	0	
2021	over 600	
2022	approx. 678	
2023	over 670	
2024	over 860	
2025		

2013 set a record for most summiters in a year, around 667, not surpassed until 2018 when around 800 summited the peak.

== Spring 2016 climbing season ==
Typical Nepal camp altitudes
- Location: Altitude (km)
Base camp 5400 m / 17700 ft.	5.4	
Camp 1 6100 m / 20000 ft.	6.1	
Camp 2 6400 m / 21000 ft.	6.4	
Camp 3 6800m / 22300 ft.	6.8	
Camp 4 8000 m / 26000 ft.	8	
Summit 8850 m / 29035 ft.	8.8	

On 11 May 2016, nine Sherpas summited Mount Everest. The next day another six persons reached the top. These were the first summitings since 2014, when 106 made it to the top. By 13 May, 42 climbers had reached the summit and by 22 May, good weather had allowed over 400 climbers to reach the summit. However, about 30 climbers developed frostbite or became sick, and two climbers died from what was reported as possible altitude sickness. Among those that had to turn back was a science expedition attempting to study the link between hypoxia and cognitive decline. Although it did not run its course, it did give some clues into the effects of high-altitude acclimatisation on human blood.

Adrian Ballinger and Cory Richards were sponsored by Eddie Bauer to climb Everest, and they relayed information from the Everest climb using the smartphone software application and service Snapchat. Mount Everest has had a 3G wireless data communication network since 2010. One of the things that was reported by them, was that bottled oxygen was stolen from them and there was some bad behaviour up there. The bottled oxygen was there for emergency back-up if they ran into trouble. Cory Richards summited Mount Everest without oxygen and returned safely, and Adrian made it almost to the top also. Another famous mountaineer, British climber Kenton Cool achieved his 12th Everest summit (the second-highest number of Everest summitings for a foreigner after Dave Hahn), and US celebrity mountaineer Melissa Arnot, completed her sixth summit, and achieved her personal goal of climbing Everest without supplemental oxygen. This also turned out to be the most summits for a foreign female (not Nepali or Chinese), and one of the first US women to summit and survive without supplemental oxygen.

In 1998, Francys Arsentiev had reached the summit, but died during the descent; she went on to become a famous corpse as a landmark known as "Sleeping Beauty" until she was buried on Everest in 2007 by one of the people who had tried to help her. Another woman from the Americas, the Ecuadorian woman Carla Perez also summited Mount Everest in 2016 without supplementary oxygen. Perez and Arnot became the fifth and sixth women to summit Everest without supplemental oxygen. There is an ongoing discussion about the use of extra bottled oxygen in mountaineering. Also at issue is Dexamethasone (Dex), which is valuable as a lifesaver as it reduces swelling in the brain if someone comes down with high-altitude cerebral edema (HACE). When American Bill Burke was interviewed for his attempt, he noted how one of his team members had overdosed on Dex, prompting a medical evacuation even as in his more recent expedition, someone had 25 doses of Dex. He also noted it was hard to argue against large supplies of Dex, due its life-saving properties against some types of altitude sickness, especially HACE.

An example of a death in which Dex was implicated was Dr. Eberhard Schaaf in 2012 on Everest. Schaaf died on descent at the south summit from altitude sickness. It has a good reputation as a life saver, and is commonly given to Everest climbers for its ability to intervene in last desperate moments when altitude sickness sets in. For example, in the 2016 season Robert Gropel said he gave Dex to his wife (as reported by the Daily Telegraph) in attempt to save her as they tried to descend Everest. Dex is not the only drug that is potentially a problem, with the UIAA noting the aforementioned dexamethasone, but also acetazolamide (aka Diamox), amphetamine, and alcohol use; and another noted Diamox (acetazolamide) use among trekkers. It is not really a matter of some authorities being for or against medications, but awareness, as misuse can cause drug interactions and various side effects. In particular it was noted that supplementary oxygen significantly lowers death rate on ultra-high altitude mountain climbing, and is generally not regulated as a drug, whereas the safe use of medications is less understood or even acknowledged in many cases. (see also: Effects of high altitude on humans)

"We estimate that during our informal survey on Everest spring 2012, at least two-thirds of climbers we contacted were prescribed several performance-enhancing drugs (PEDs) and had intended to use them not for rescue, but to increase their chances of summit success"

— Dr. L. Freer of Everest ER

Mexican-American David Liaño Gonzalez (aka David Liano) summited for the sixth time, promoting a charity and also carrying a Seattle Seahawks flag with him to the Everest summit. Another sports team represented at the Everest summit was the Denver Broncos, with its flag unfurled by Kim Hess. Rounding out US mountaineering was news that a group of soldiers and veterans summited, including some who had been wounded in combat. A British wounded veteran (one-eyed) was also trying to summit but gave up his bid to help some Indian climbers.

In 2016 the first climbers from Sri Lanka, Myanmar, and Tunisia reached the summit of Mount Everest. Only two other people from North Africa have summited Everest, one from Algeria and the other from Morocco. The youngest Australian woman to summit Mount Everest was Alyssa Azar. She returned to Australia safely, but a bittersweet victory for Australia after the loss of another Australian woman who was also trying to summit that May with her husband. The youngest Japanese woman also summited (and returned alive) at the age of 19. Another woman record-breaker in 2016 was the first woman from Thailand to summit Mount Everest, Napassaporn Chumnarnsit, who was granted an audience with the Prime Minister of Thailand for her achievement. The first person with cystic fibrosis also summited Mount Everest on his third try. Also, a 61-year-old summited with two artificial knees. He had been trying for several years and had lost his Nepali friend Sherpa Nawang Tenzing in the 2015 earthquakes. He was not alone in being grief-stricken, as many climbers connected with the Everest mountaineering community lost climbing buddies in two years of disasters. One who narrowly survived the disasters himself climbed this year to bring attention to the disease Lewy body dementia (DLB), which had affected his father.

== Rescues and fatalities ==
2016 fatalities
Fatalities	Nationality
Eric Arnold	Netherlands
Dr. Maria Strydom	Australia
Subhash Pal	India
*Phurba Sherpa	Nepal
Paresh Nath	India
Goutam Ghosh	India
Dr. Charles MacAdams	Canada
*Lhotse face fatality

On 11 May 2016 a Calgary physician died in Tibet, in the Chinese-side base camp. A 25-year-old Nepali named Phurba Sherpa, fixing lines near the Lhotse summit, fell to his death. A guide company, Arnold Coster Expeditions, suffered two fatalities, and a third client had to be airlifted out. One was a man from the Netherlands, and another was a South African-born Australian woman. Her husband had tried to save her, but he also ran into trouble and had to be airlifted out with medical complications. These deaths were very widely reported in international news and triggered some public discussion about Everest mountaineering and tourism.

=== Indian expedition ===
An Indian expedition from West Bengal suffered three fatalities and a fourth member, Sunita Hazra had to be rescued on her way down. The team was led by a South Korean climber named Jinchol Cha, and had four Indian Bengalis: Subhash Pal, Goutam Ghosh, Paresh Nath and Sunita Hazra (female, 38) with Loben Sherpa accompanying them. The team, managed by Trekking Camp Nepal, had attempted to climb the peak on 21 May.

While climbing up, Paresh and Goutam became sick near Camp IV and could neither ascend nor descend from the higher camps near 8,000 metres. Lakpa Sherpa and Subhash Pal, the Indian mountaineer, from Bankura, West Bengal continued climbing and reached the summit of Mount Everest on Saturday, 21 May 2016. On 22 May 2016, Pal collapsed while descending the Hillary Step ice wall. He died in the region between Camp IV and Camp III, due to frostbite which later led to hypothermia. While descending from the summit, Sherpa found both Paresh and Goutam dead near Camp IV. After reaching near Camp III, Subhash was unable to speak or move due to altitude sickness. The team tried to save him but could not.

A British climber Leslie Binns gave up his summit bid to help and rescue Sunita who had fallen and was ailing on her descent. The climber successfully rescued her and tried to save another from her expedition team. With the help of four climbers, Sunita was rescued. Their stock of bottled oxygen was running out, so they quickly descended to Camp II, saving Sunita's life. She was airlifted from Camp II the next day by the Himalayan Rescue Association to Kathmandu with severe frostbite injuries. Sunita was treated at Norvic International Hospital. She lost two fingers due to frostbite.

Six Sherpas stayed in the region for five days to search for and rescue the missing climbers. They retrieved Subhash's body and returned. Paresh's and Goutam's bodies remained on the mountain and could not be retrieved until the following climbing season, in late May 2017, due to bad weather.

They were part of a larger eleven-member expedition from India. Eight had reached the summit, including the injured woman, Hazra. However, according to a detailed report on the Indian expedition in the New York Times, the Nepalese government is not counting Hazra's climb as a successful summit due to a credible lack of evidence.

=== Death toll ===
The death toll for Everest climbers rose to five in most reports by late May 2016, and with a death of a high-altitude worker on Lhotse face during the season (Everest summiters sometimes need to climb Lhotse face depending on the route), gave a total of six known deaths from the Everest massif by the time the season drew to a close. Although not widely reported during May, a climber in Tibet had died on 11 May 2016 which makes it possibly six for Mount Everest and seven for the Everest Massif. The Nepal ministry of tourism said five people died (on the Nepali side).
