= Mount Everest in 2017 =

Mount Everest climbing season

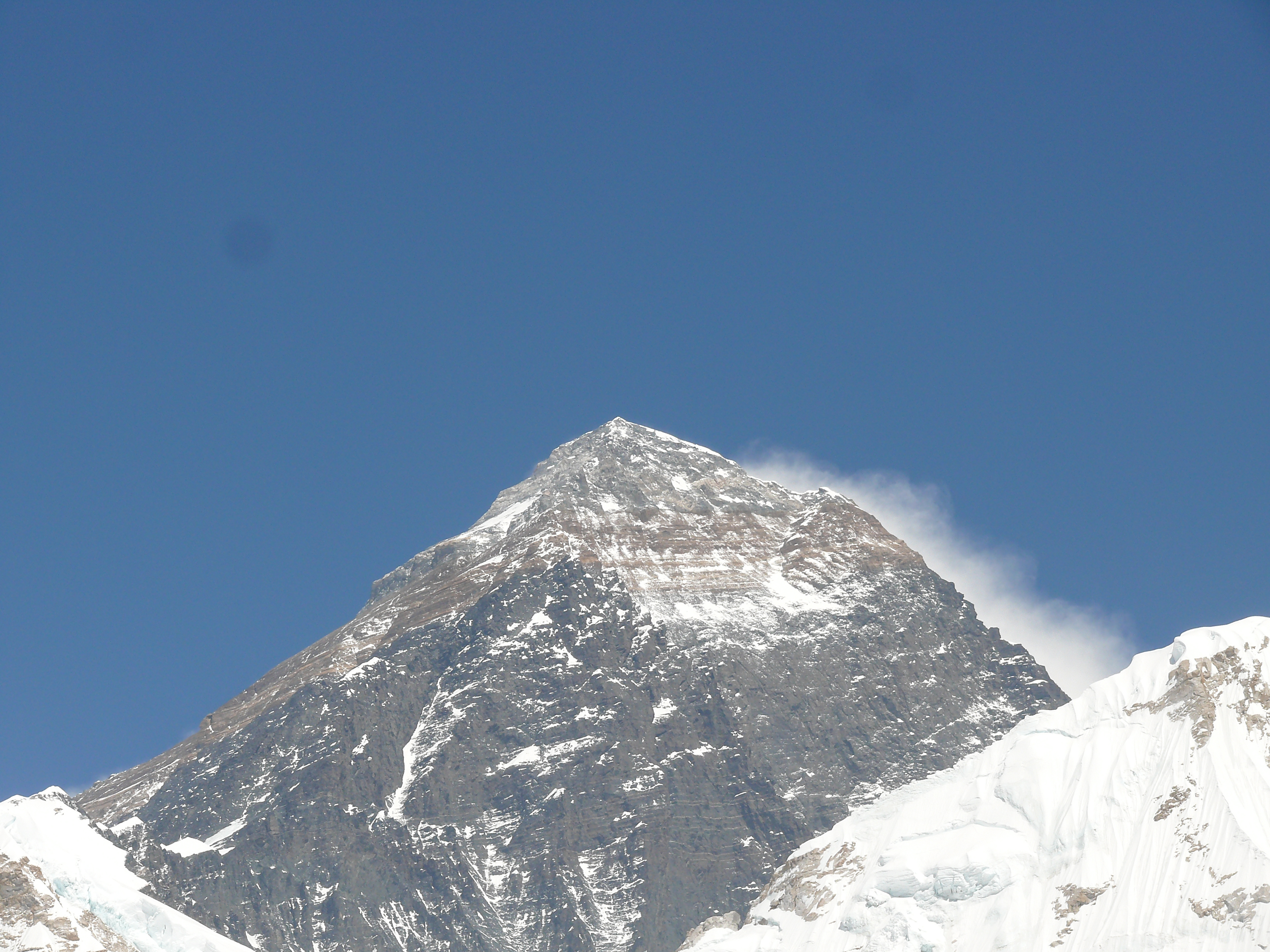
Mount Everest, mostly the south-east face

The Mount Everest climbing season of 2017 began in spring with the first climbers reaching the top on May 11, from the north side. The first team on the south side reached the top on May 15. By early June, reports from Nepal indicated that 445 people had made it to the summit from the Nepali side. Reports indicate 160–200 summits on the north side, with 600–660 summiteers overall for early 2017. This year had a roughly 50% success rate on that side for visiting climbers, which was down from other years. By 2018, the figure for the number of summiteers of Everest was refined to 648. This includes 449 which summited via Nepal (from the South) and 120 from Chinese Tibet (North side).

Swiss mountaineer Ueli Steck died in a fall during a warm-up climb on Nuptse, which he was conducting in preparation for his Everest-Lhotse summit bid. By May 22, 2017, five climbers had died, and one trekker to base camp died earlier in the year.

Several climbers summited twice this season, including Kilian Jornet and Anshu Jamsenpa.

== Mountaineering season ==
Years in review summary
Year	Summiteers	Reference(s)
2012	547	
2013	658	
2014	106	
2015	0	
2016	641	
2017	648	
2018	807	
2019	891	
2020	0	
2021	over 600	
2022	approx. 678	
2023	over 670	
2024	over 860	
2025		

Typical Nepal camp altitudes
- Location: Altitude (km)
Base camp 5400 m / 17700 ft.	5.4	
Camp 1 6100 m / 20000 ft.	6.1	
Camp 2 6400 m / 21000 ft.	6.4	
Camp 3 6800m / 22300 ft.	6.8	
Camp 4 8000 m / 26000 ft.	8	
Summit 8850 m / 29035 ft.	8.8	

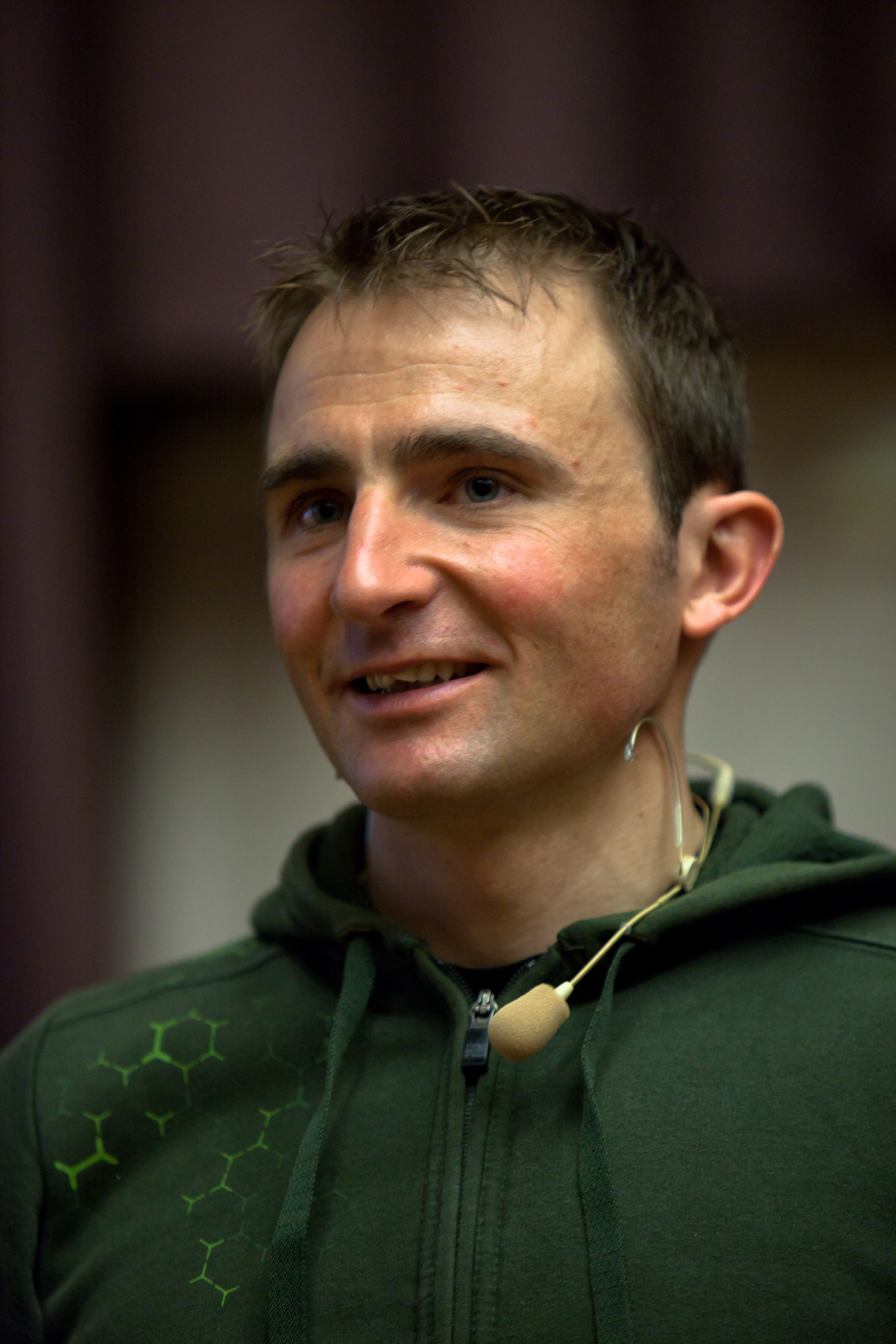
Ueli Steck, who died following a fall in a practice climb.

=== Winter ===
Spanish mountaineer Alex Txikon with Pakistani mountaineer Muhammad Ali Sadpara attempted to summit Everest in winter without supplemental oxygen. Txikon reached Camp 4 at approximately 7,950 meters on 31 January 2018 before being turned back by bad weather conditions.

=== Spring ===
The Mount Everest summit season was set to be the largest climbing season in the modern history of the mountain with 365 people on 39 teams from around the world, just on the south/Nepal side. The Nepal Department of Tourism said they had issued the most permits this year since this process began. By May 3, there were 371 permits for climbers, and with their guides, around 800 could summit Everest from the south. By April 23, the route to Mount Everest's South Col area had been opened. The south side was expected to become a "global village" for about two months as hundreds of people from around the world undertake expeditions to the mountain. On the north side were roughly 200 mountaineers planning to climb Everest from Tibet. A few dozen climbers from both sides made it the top in mid-May before the weather turned again. In late May, the window before the monsoon season hits was predicted to open and the bulk of the expeditions began their summit bid.

In early April, it was reported that at least 250 climbers on 27 expeditions were headed for Mount Everest. This grew to 289 climbers from 34 groups by April 20. All permits purchased for the spring season of 2015 were extended for two years, allowing those who had been unable to climb due to the earthquake and subsequent avalanches to return. 70 people returned in 2017 under this program.

The first joint military exercise between the People's Republic of China and Nepal, called Sagarmatha Friendship-2017, took place April 16–25. The exercise focused on combating terrorism in the region and disaster-response management.

China announced plans to build hotels, restaurants, and ski resorts on the Tibet side of Everest, having completed a new asphalt road to Everest in 2016. China has had a reputation for being more difficult with permits than Nepal, but has taken steps to improve access to the north side.

British DJ Paul Oakenfold hosted "the highest party on Earth" in April at the Everest base camp, which was attended by over 100 people.

An international collaboration between India and Nepal celebrating the 250th anniversary of the survey of India sought to re-measure the height of Everest. Everest's height was measured by Survey of India in 1855 and 1957, however there is concern that the April 2015 Nepal earthquake and avalanches may have changed the height of the mountain.

The highest-altitude restaurant in the world opened in April at the Nepal base camp.

Cleanup activities from earlier years carried on with fresh vigour, as a special operation in March focused on clearing piled-up debris and further reviving the spot. The Nepal government and Everest expeditions worked together to distribute trash bags to remove debris from this season and from previous years, when people had to evacuate. Collected trash will be removed by helicopters, which usually return empty after delivering supplies. Sherpas were paid for carrying rubbish down the mountain on their return trips.

A French-backed expedition called Everest Green went on an independent waste-retrieval mission, collecting about five tonnes of garbage from the Nepal base camp up to the South Col area. Of that, three tonnes were able to be recycled, and the mission ran for 40 days between April 13 and May 23.

==== May ====
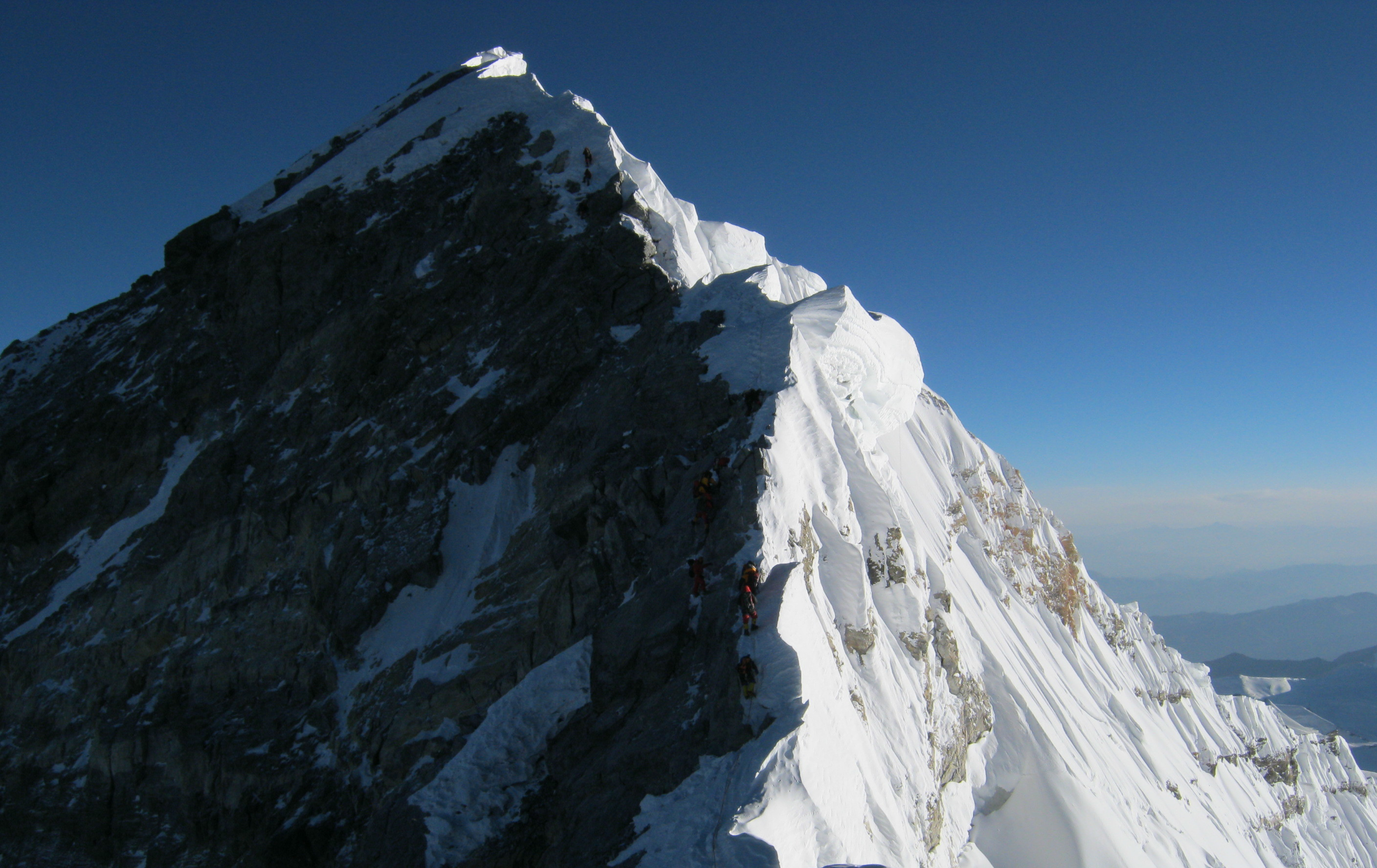
Looking up along the southern ridgeline, the face of the Hillary Step is visible. The face in shadow on the left is the south-west face, and to the right is the top of the east/Kangshung face. The extent of change to the step, caused by the 2015 earthquake, has been debated (2010 photo)

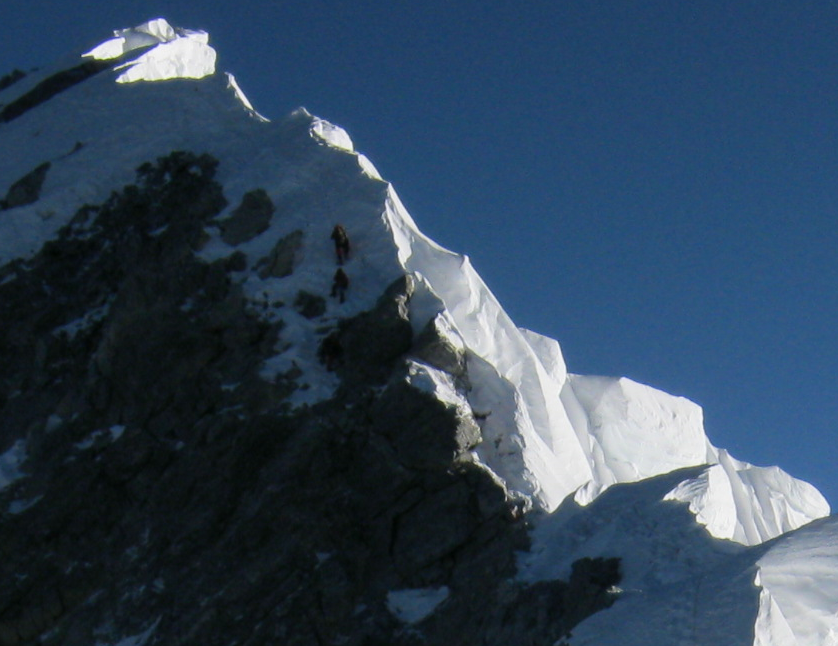
Closer view of the Step in 2010

On May 13, the first mountaineers climbed Everest from the Chinese Tibet route, with 16 reaching the top. The group consisted of 6 climbers from India and 10 Sherpa helpers. Ropes had been laid two days earlier, and there was a window of good weather. The ascent opened what one reporter called "the summit blitz". In the early morning of Monday, May 15, 14 members of the Gurkha Everest Expedition summited from the Nepal side. Expedition organizers predicted that 150 would try for the summit in the following days.

By May 15, at least 35 more climbers from around the world had summited.

By May 25, an estimated 300–400 people had summited Mount Everest from the Nepal side, and another 120 or so from the Chinese Tibet side.

It was discovered that the 2015 earthquake had altered the famed Hillary Step. The 40-foot climb is thought to have been reduced to a gentle rock slope. Various mountaineers confirmed in 2017 the news that the rocks of Everest had been altered. The extent of the destruction has been disputed.

A South African filmmaker who tried to climb Everest without a permit was apprehended and arrested in May. The man faces a fine and may be banned from climbing mountains in Nepal for up to 10 years.

=== Records ===
On May 27, 2017, Kami Rita Sherpa, climbing with the Alpine Ascents Everest Expedition, reached the summit for the 21st time. Apa Sherpa and Phurba Tashi Sherpa are the only other people who have done so.

Kilian Jornet completed an unassisted speed climb from base camp to the summit in 26 hours without bottled oxygen or fixed ropes, setting a new record. The complete climb, including return to base camp, took under 40 hours, and included a 12,400-foot (3,800 m) vertical ascent. A standard climb using a typical route takes approximately four days from North base camp to the summit. Jornet summited again on May 28, 2017, achieving two summits in less than a week. This climb, which began at advanced base camp, took 17 hours. Jornet's speed climb was one of fastest since Hans Kammerlander completed the normal Tibet-side route in 16 hours 45 minutes in 1996, setting the official Guinness World Record. In 2005, Christian Stangl reached the top of Everest from advanced base camp in 16 hours and 42 minutes.

To climb Everest without oxygen is an accomplishment fewer than 200 people have experienced. And it normally takes three to four days, involving a grueling step-by-step battle with multiple overnights rests. To do so twice in the same week is nearly unbelievable. Jornet's two summits push the boundaries of human abilities and high-altitude mountaineering.

— Gear Junkie's Nate Mika in "Jornet Speed-Climbs Everest, Twice In One Week", 2017

Famed Nepali-American mountaineer Lhakpa Sherpa attained her eighth Mount Everest summit, enhancing the world record for most times to the top for a woman. On May 21, 2017, Anshu Jamsenpa became the first woman to summit Everest twice within a week, doing so in five days, and became the first Indian woman to climb Mount Everest for the fifth time. Also on May 21, Vilborg Arna Gissurardóttir became the first Icelandic woman to summit Everest, and Ada Tsang became the first Hong Kong woman to summit Everest. She completed the climb on her third attempt, together with a physiotherapist and mountaineer, Elton Ng. On May 22, Yusrina Ya'akob became the first female Malay Singaporean to summit Everest.

The second blind man to summit Everest, Andy Holzer of Austria, reached the top on May 21 from the north, making him the first blind summiteer since 2001.

On May 22, 2017, Chris Bombardier became the first person with hemophilia to reach the top of Everest.

=== Fatalities ===
2017 fatalities
Fatalities	Nationality
Mathew Jones	Australia
Ueli Steck	Switzerland
Min Bahadur Sherchan	Nepal
Vladimír Štrba	Slovakia
Roland Yearwood	United States
Francesco Enrico Marchetti	Australia
Ravi Kumar	India

In the 21st century, an average of 7 people have died each year trying to summit Everest or as part of base camp support. In the four years before 2017, 46 people died, with higher numbers due to avalanches. Some of the biggest dangers come from the cold, falls, avalanches, and high altitude, which can trigger altitude sickness.

On April 30, Ueli Steck, described as the greatest climber of his time, was warming up for an Everest-Lhotse summit attempt with a solo climb on Nuptse when he fell over 3000 feet. He had previously survived a fall off Annapurna when trying to solo climb it alpine style. Steck was famous for modern alpine accomplishments including holding the speed record on the Matterhorn's north face, and summiting every peak over 4000 meters in the Alps in 61 days (1 day short of the record).

A trekker to base camp died of altitude sickness in March.

85-year-old Min Bahadur Sherchan died on May 6 at Everest base camp in Nepal. He became the oldest man to summit Mount Everest in 2008 at the age of 76, a record that stood until 2013. He returned in 2017 to summit the mountain again. One of his goals in doing this was to inspire and encourage people as they get older.

The weekend of May 19–21 claimed four more climbers from various causes. The climbers came from India, Australia, the United States, and Slovakia.

Goth Kubir Rai, a Nepali porter, died at base camp in May.

There were reports of four bodies found in a tent in May, which were later found to be false.

=== Corpse retrievals ===
The bodies of two people who died the previous year, Goutam Ghosh and Paresh Nath, were removed in 2017. The two had been unable to be retrieved previously because of inclement weather. The body of Ueli Steck was recovered near Nuptse, where he had fallen. A recovery operation took place for the body of Vladimir Strba, who died at Camp IV (Nepal-side) in May.

At the end of May, the body of Ravi Kumar was recovered from above 8000 meters and without loss of additional life. Kumar's body had fallen into a crevasse and the effort to recover it was described as "the most complex recovery mission to ever be attempted on Everest". There was a strong push to recover the body before the window of good weather closed, as the monsoon season to the south grew in force.

== Medical science ==
The Xtreme Everest project continued its multi-year mission to study how the body adapts to high altitude and the physiological changes that occur.

== See also ==
- 2015 Mount Everest avalanche
- Lhotse
