= Arkansas School for Mathematics, Sciences, and the Arts =

- Great Seal of ASMSA

Location
- 200 Whittington Avenue; Ouachita Mountains; Hot Springs, Garland County, Arkansas 71901; United States; 34°31′05″N 93°03′29″W

Information
- Former name: Arkansas School for Mathematics and Sciences
- School type: Public Residential High School
- Established: 1991 (35 years ago)
- Founder: William Jefferson Clinton
- Parent Institution: University of Arkansas System
- CEEB code: 041148
- Executive Director: Derek McDowell
- Grades: 10th–12th
- Gender: Co-educational
- Enrollment: 250
- Education system: Semester
- Colors: Hunter green and navy blue
- Athletics conference: SLAMT
- Mascot: Cyborg Dolphin
- Accreditation: Cognia
- National ranking: 13th
- Publication: Tangents
- Tuition: Free
- Communities served: State of Arkansas
- Graduates (2017-2018): 100%
- Affiliation: NCSS; Arts Schools Network; University of Arkansas System
- Website: www.asmsa.org

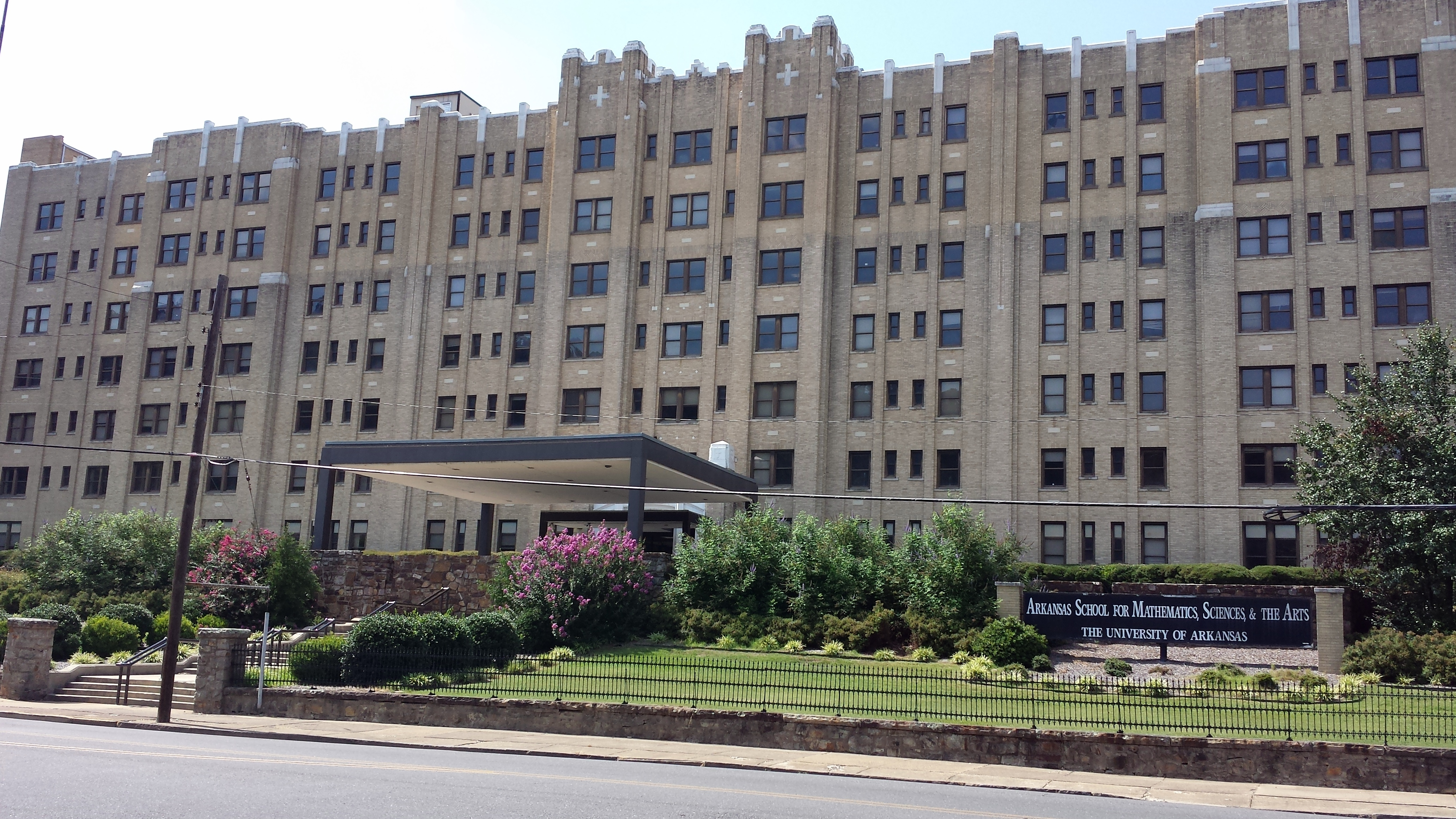
Original Residential Building, currently under renovations. Parts of the building are still used for faculty offices.

The Arkansas School for Mathematics, Sciences, and the Arts (ASMSA) is a public residential high school located in Hot Springs, Arkansas that serves sophomores, juniors, and seniors. It is a part of the University of Arkansas System and a member of the National Consortium of STEM Schools and Arts Schools Network. The school was originally known as the Arkansas School for Mathematics and Sciences (abbreviated ASMS). The school is accredited by Cognia.

== School description ==
Academically, the school is modeled after the North Carolina School of Science and Mathematics. Studies focus on mathematics, computer science, science, and humanities. All courses are taught at the Honors level or above. ASMSA offers approximately 70 courses for university credit through a partnership with the University of Arkansas at Fort Smith and other advanced high school courses for elective credit. ASMSA graduates finish their experience having earned an average of 50 college credit hours. In 2004, the state legislature merged the school with the University of Arkansas System and formally added fine and performing arts to ASMSA's mission. Though not yet at the depth of the school's STEM-based programs, investment has been made in recent years to enhance the studio and digital arts experiences. The school has added six full-time faculty members in studio art and music to achieve this goal.

The school was created in 1991 with backing from then-Governor Bill Clinton. The charter class enrolled as juniors in 1993 and graduated in 1995.

Prospective students apply during the spring of their sophomore or freshman year and submit application forms, grade transcripts, SAT or ACT results, and three letters of recommendation. Students can enter via normal admissions as a junior or enter through early admissions as a sophomore. Additionally, some students can repeat their junior year of high school at ASMSA if they choose to apply their current junior year, called Super Juniors.

Most of the campus of the school itself is located in the former St. Joseph's Catholic Hospital in the William Jefferson Clinton Presidential Park in the historic district of Hot Springs, and it is surrounded on three sides by the Hot Springs National Park. In 2021, the attached chapel underwent a $5.5 million renovation to transform the space into residential halls, offices for professional mental health staff, and a student union. The space was named Helen Selig Hall after the 1994 Hot Springs mayor who was one of the earliest and most vocal proponents to bring ASMSA to Hot Springs.

All faculty have at least a master's degree in their field, and 48% have a Ph.D. or other terminal degree in their field.

Several former and current teachers at the school also instruct during the summer at the Arkansas Governor's School. The current Director of the school is Corey Alderdice.

A new building called the Creativity and Innovation Complex was constructed and added to the campus in 2019. The first floor will be named the Dan Fredinburg Technology Center in memory of ASMSA Class of 1999 alumnus Dan Fredinburg.

== Capstone ==
ASMSA students have many projects and activities that fill their time. One of the school's trademarks is Capstone (formerly called FIRM), a longitudinal research project which culminates in the school's participation in the Intel Science and Engineering Fair, Humanities Research Symposium, Music Capstone, or Arts Capstone, depending on the project. Stem Students select a research topic at the start of their spring semester as a junior and will continue to research this project for the next fourteen months through a Fundamentals in Research Methods class. This project ends during Science Fair week, which is generally in late February. ASMSA competes as its own region in the state competition because of the number of projects it produces every year—often a hundred or more. Projects sometimes culminate with substantial monetary awards, governmental recognition, and publication in local, statewide, regional, and nationwide news outlets. Humanities students choose a project fall semester and present it at the symposium in May of their junior year.

== Student life ==
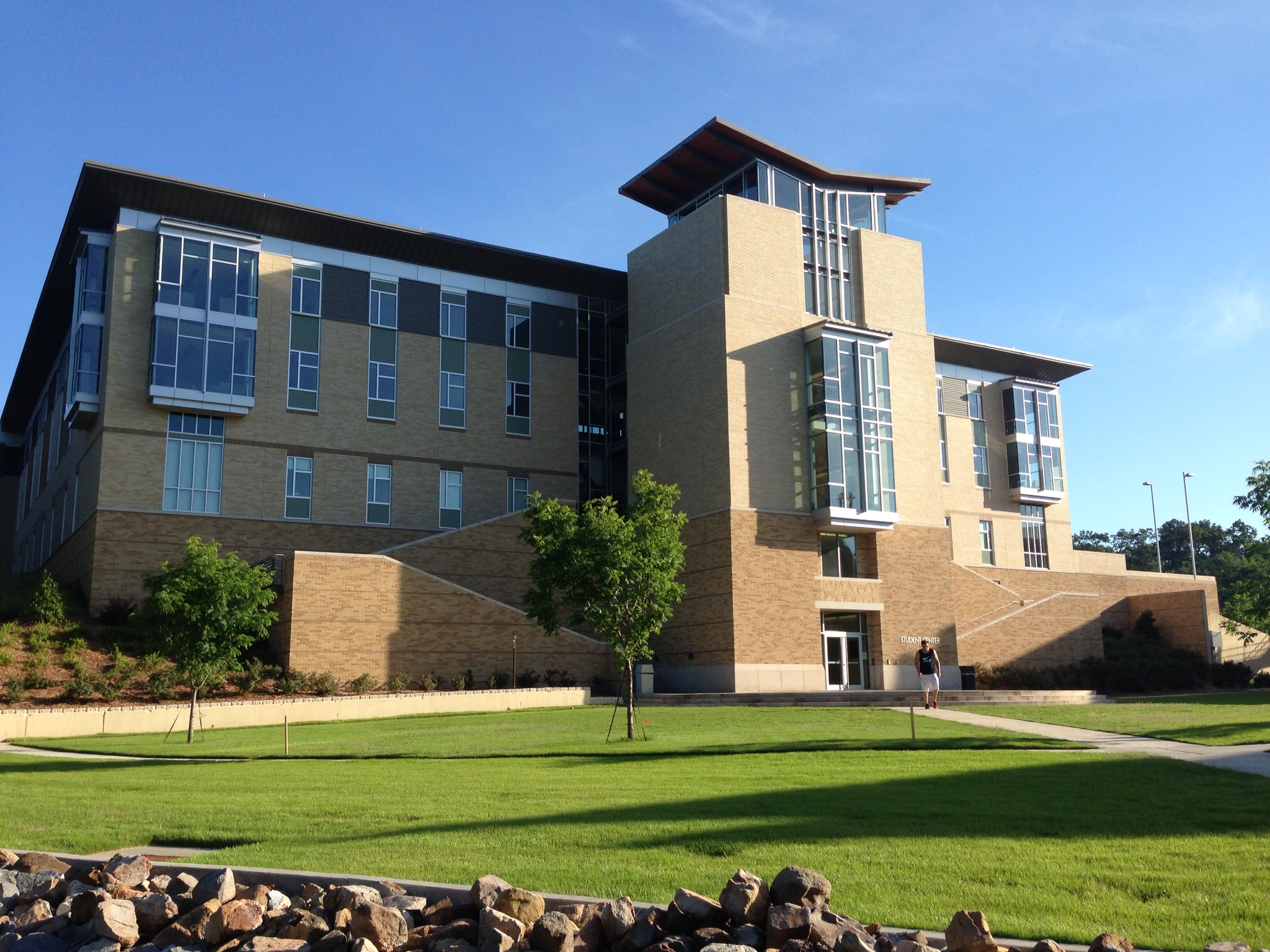
New Student Life Center built in 2012. This is currently the residence for ASMSA students

There are a plethora of clubs, associations, and groups available for students. The cultural awareness ADAPT Club shares and discusses different heritages, often with cultural foods, games, movies, stories, and music for the members as well as the general student body to enjoy, accept, and appreciate. There is also the SGA (Student Government Association) for those students exhibiting leadership in the school environment and policy. Other clubs, associations, and groups include the Dolphin Dance Team, Model UN, Beta, Delta, National Honor Society, FBLA, Youth Branch of the National Association for the Advancement of Science, Technology, Medicine, Music, and Liberal Arts (NAASTMML), SLAMT Sports Alliance, Community Leaders (CLs), Student Ambassadors, Admissions Delegates and Peer Mentors.
