= Mount Everest in 2012 =

Mount Everest climbing season

Years in Review Summary
Year	Summiters	Reference(s)
2012	547	
2013	658	
2014	106	
2015	0	
2016	641	
2017	648	
2018	807	
2019	891	
2020	0	
2021	over 600	
2022	approx. 678	
2023	over 670	
2024	over 860	
2025		

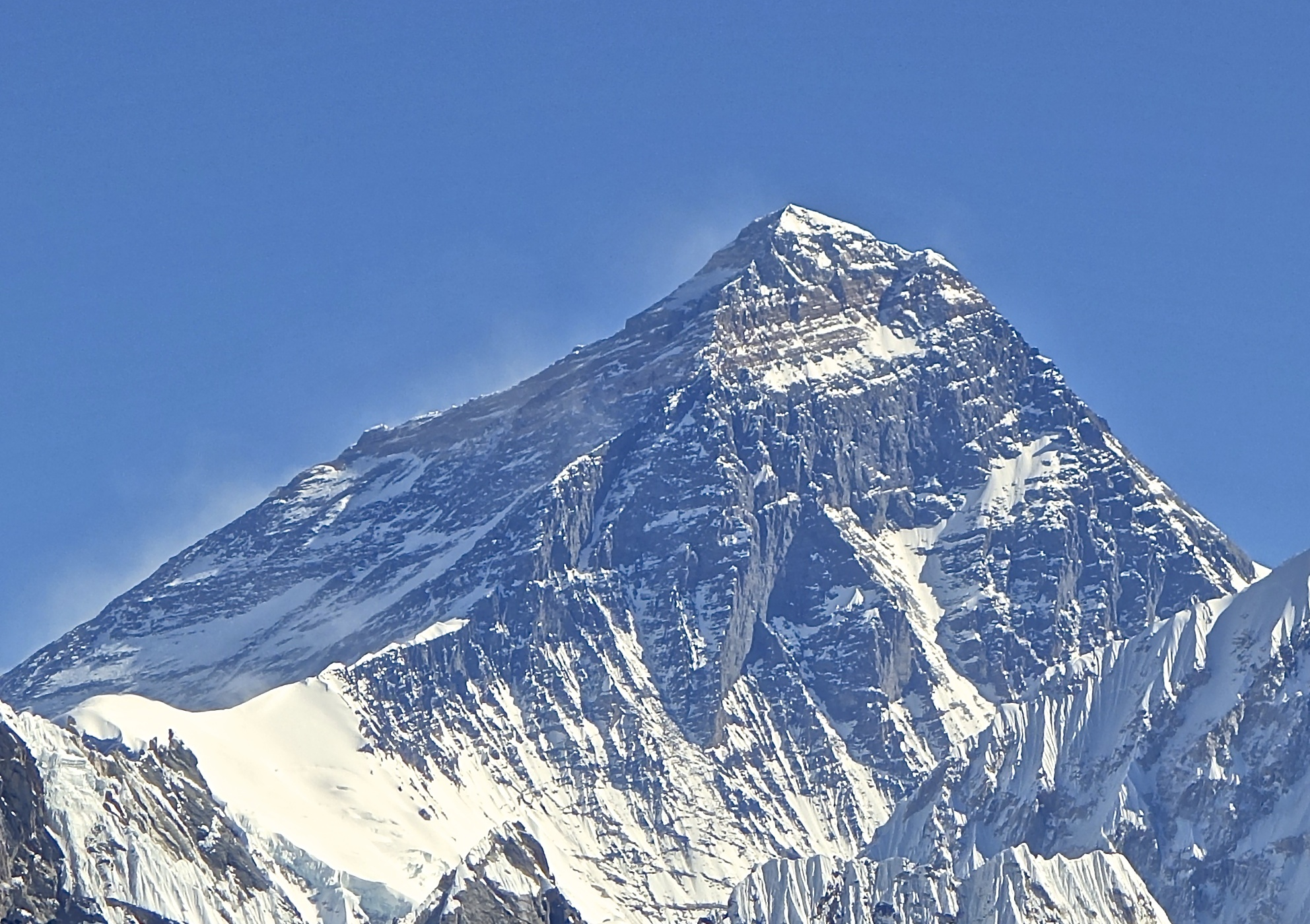
Everest from Gokyo Ri, 2012

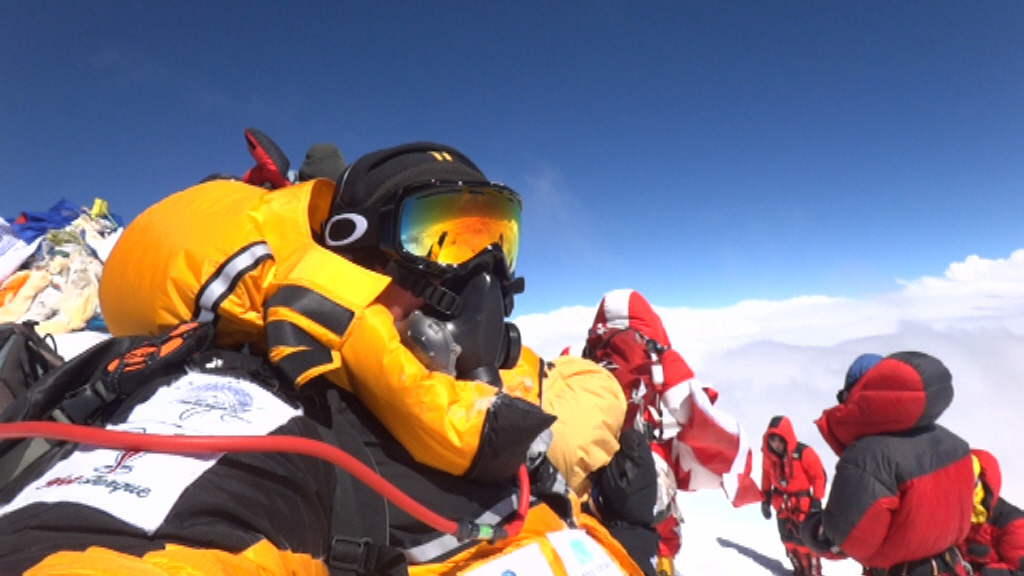
People on the summit in 2012

Mount Everest climbing season included 245 summits on May 19, 2012, a record number of summits on a single day. It would take seven more years to break this record. This added congestion resulted in the highest fatality total since 1996. 683 climbers from 34 countries attempted to climb the mountain, and 547 people summited. A record was set in May when 234 climbers summitted on a single day. There were 11 deaths, some of which were attributed to overcrowding near the peak.

== Mountaineering season ==
In addition to an increase in mountaineers compared to previous decades, the success rate for expeditions increased. There was a 56 percent success rate in summit attempts in 2012, compared to 24 percent in 2000. 547 people reached the summit, compared to 72 in 1990 and 145 in 2000. Amongst those who summited in 2012 was Vanessa O'Brien who completed the Explorers Grand Slam.

The difficult decisions made during the climbing season were highlighted by the departure of guiding company Himex from the mountain after concerns about a hanging serac in the Khumbu icefall. Two years later, 16 Nepalese guides were killed when ice broke from the serac and created an avalanche.

In 2012 Montana State University conducted a scientific expedition to Everest. The Everest Education Expedition studied the geology of the Everest massif which includes Everest-Nuptse-Lhotse-Khumbutse, and advanced the state of mineralogy, strain, and predicted rock ages. Of interest was the fossil-bearing limestone that crowns Mount Everest, the nature and impact of ice in the region (such as the icefall), and the overall stratigraphy (including limestone, metamorphic rocks, pelites, and quartzites).

In May, Tamae Watanabe became the oldest woman to reach the summit, at the age of 73. She broke her own record, set in 2002 at the age of 63. The retired office worker lives at the base of Mount Fuji, and had climbed many other peaks including Denali, the Eiger, and Lhotse. She climbed with a group of four, and beat a competing 72-year-old woman who was trying for the same record.

The Guinness Book of World Records states that 234 climbers summited on one day in 2012. However, it was one of the deadliest seasons since 1996, with 11 climbers dying on Everest in the spring.

== Fatalities ==
The death of Canadian climber Shriya Shah-Klorfine in May made headlines and fed a debate about whether inexperienced climbers should climb Mount Everest. Issues of overcrowding and unqualified guides were also raised. Although Shah-Klorfine did manage to summit, she did not survive the descent. Questions were raised about her lack of previous mountaineering experience, as Everest was reportedly her first mountain climb. The guiding company she employed had reportedly never guided a climber to the summit before. Other factors involved overcrowding on the mountain, a late summit bid, and insufficient bottled oxygen. The company alleges that she ignored instructions to turn around and earlier recommendations to not attempt the climb due to her lack of climbing skills.

Four people, including Shah-Klorfine, died on Saturday May 19, 2012. Conditions on the mountain were described as overcrowded.

2012 fatalities
Deaths	Nation
Ralf Dieter Arnold	Germany
Juan Jose Polo Carbayo	Spain
Karsang Namgyal	Nepal
Ramesh Gulave	India
Namgyal Tshering	Nepal
Dawa Tenzing	Nepal
Wen-Yi Ha	China
Eberhard Schaaf	Germany
Shriya Shah-Klorfine	Canada
Won-Bin Song	South Korea
Milan Sedlacek*	Czech Republic
Temba Sherpa*	Nepal
*Lhotse fatality
