= Dan Fredinburg =

American technology executive and explorer (1981–2015)

- Born: Daniel Paul Fredinburg; September 8, 1981; Mission Viejo, California, United States
- Died: April 25, 2015 (aged 33); South Base Camp, Mount Everest, Nepal
- Cause of death: Head injuries resulting from an avalanche
- Education: Arkansas School for Mathematics, Sciences, and the Arts; University of California, Irvine; University of Southern California
- Occupations: Manager and head of privacy at Google X

Daniel Paul Fredinburg (September 8, 1981 – April 25, 2015) was an American Google executive, climate activist, explorer, and entrepreneur. He was among the victims of an avalanche at Mount Everest's Base Camp triggered by the April 2015 Nepal earthquake.

== Early life ==
Fredinburg grew up on a farm in Norfork, Arkansas, and left home at the age of 15 to attend the Arkansas School for Mathematics, Sciences, and the Arts in Hot Springs.

He graduated from the University of California, Irvine in 2004, earned a master's degree in intelligent robotics from the University of Southern California, and completed other graduate coursework at Stanford University and the University of California, Berkeley.

== Career ==
Fredinburg began working for Google in 2007. He was head of privacy at Google X, an advisor on Project Loon, and the co-founder of The Laundry SF and Save the Ice. He launched Google Adventure Team, an effort to map geological areas and formations on Earth at a similar level of detail to Google Earth's street-level view of cities, towns, and other populated areas (including the Great Barrier Reef, the floors of the oceans, and high and/or remote mountains and mountain ranges, including the Himalayas).

Fredinburg was co-inventor of more than a dozen software technologies that were patented by Google.

Prior to working at Google, Fredinburg worked on future combat systems in the defense industry at Boeing.

== Expeditions ==
Although non-disclosure agreements prevented Google from commenting on the "two or three different Google projects" related to Fredinburg's expedition work, at a minimum, he was one of four company employees documenting Mount Everest ascent routes for a Google Earth-type project. In a 2013 interview for Time magazine, Fredinburg explained the company's goal as "Different adventurers and people who want to explore from the comfort of their homes have the opportunity to explore and see these different corners of the world." According to The Independent, Fredinburg's job title at the time was "Google 'I' adventurer", and the project goal was to offer the experience of climbing the world's highest mountains to people who, "lack the willingness to actually, like, climb a mountain."

On April 24, 2015, Fredinburg unrolled a banner on top of Kala Patthar, for the climate change cause SaveTheIce.org.

Fredinburg, who had been on the mountain for three weeks and who had spoken of his narrow escape from the 2014 Mount Everest avalanche which killed 16 Nepalese guides, was one of four American citizens killed in the 2015 Mount Everest-South Base Camp disaster, following the 2015 Nepal earthquake. Five Sherpas carried Fredinburg's body down the mountain, to a U.S. Army Special Forces helicopter evacuating climbers several days after the avalanche.

Although he had not yet reached the summit of Everest, Fredinburg had topped four of the Seven Summits using the same pair of hiking boots, including Mount Elbrus in Europe, Kilimanjaro in Africa, and Aconcagua in South America, all three of which he had photographed for Google. Fredinburg likened Aconcagua to a "gates of hell" experience, telling Time there were mule skeletons sticking up out of the ground. Fredinburg also climbed the difficult and relatively inaccessible Puncak Jaya (Carstensz Pyramid), the highest peak in Oceania, and was briefly jailed after descending into the nearby Grasberg mine.

== Social causes ==
In the aftermath of Hurricane Sandy, Fredinburg organized a relief effort in New York City, Staten Island, with the aim to support victims of the storm who became homeless.

A 2014 SaveTheIce.org project in the Baltic states was featured in the Discovery Digital Networks production In the Making.

Fredinburg founded The Laundry, a San Francisco-based business incubator geared towards building a community and productive environment for social impact.

== Personal life ==
Fredinburg dated actress Sophia Bush from 2013 to 2014. The two remained close friends after breaking up. Upon learning of Fredinburg's death, Bush stated, "There are no adequate words. Dan Fredinburg was one-of-a-kind. Fearless. Funny. I'm devastated and simultaneously so deeply grateful to have known and loved him."

== Legacy ==
A Crowdrise page set up raised approximately $100,000 for relief in Nepal.

A 501(c)(3) foundation was created in Fredinburg's name; "Dan Fredinburg Foundation" aims to raise funds indefinitely to power social movements around invention, adventure, and action.

LiveDan, a campaign website, was launched to promote the principles which guided Fredinburg's life.

A new building at the Arkansas School for Mathematics, Sciences and the Arts (ASMSA) called the Creativity and Innovation Complex is being constructed and was set to open in 2019. The first floor will be named the Dan Fredinburg Technology Center.
