= Mount Everest in 2013 =

Mount Everest climbing season

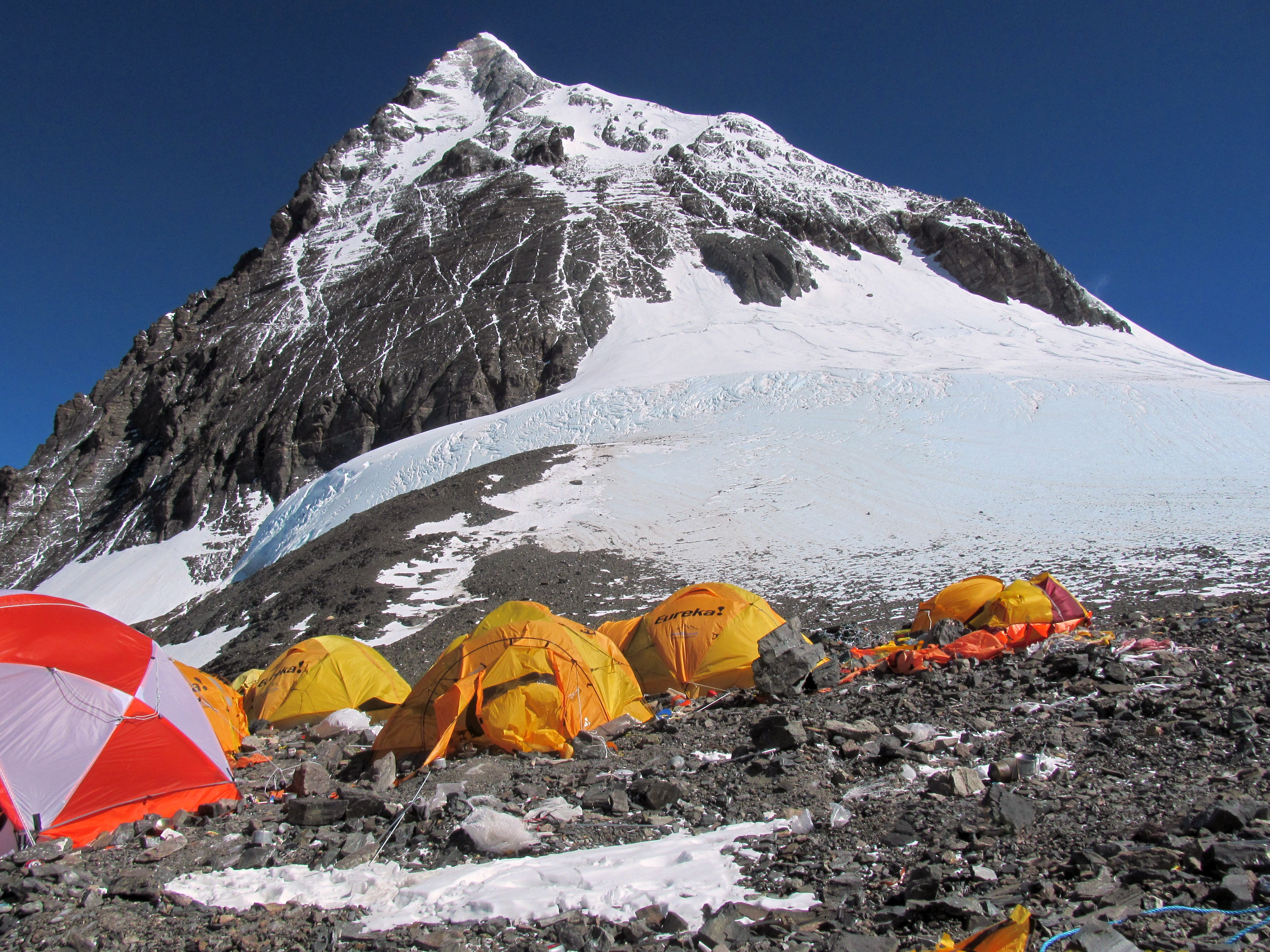
Everest from the South Col, 2013

The Mount Everest climbing season of 2013 included 658 summits and 8 deaths. Due to avalanches in 2014 and 2015, this was the last big summiting year until 2016.

== 2013 mountaineering season ==
Years in Review Summary
Year	Summiters	Reference(s)
2012	547	
2013	658	
2014	106	
2015	0	
2016	641	
2017	648	
2018	807	
2019	891	
2020	0	
2021	over 600	
2022	approx. 678	
2023	over 670	
2024	over 860	
2025		

Another view from around the South Col area up toward the higher elevations of Everest, on 20 May 2013

The 2013 Himalayan Database recorded 658 summits, which brought the total number to 6,871 by 4,042 different persons. The year's total was greater than 2007's 633 summiters, the previous yearly record.

In 2013, Yuichiro Miura became the oldest person to reach the summit, at age 80.

A Eurocopter AS350 B3 flown by Maurizio Folini achieved a record breaking rescue at 7,800 m (25,590 ft) on the morning of 21 May, retrieving Sudarshan Gautam, who was descending the mountain after becoming the first person without arms to summit Everest without using prosthetics. Gautam was rescued after collapsing near Camp 3. On 21 May 2013 a team from Lawrence School Sanawar climbed Mt. Everest. The first school to do this globally.

On 21 May, Arunima Sinha became the first female amputee to summit Everest.

Phurba Tashi completed his 21st summit in May, a total equal to the record held by Apa Sherpa.

== Assault on climbers ==
On 27 April, three climbers were allegedly attacked by a group of 100 Sherpas at 21,000 feet (6,400 m) elevation. However the claim of the number of Sherpas attacking the climbers has been greatly exaggerated. The event was seen as an aberration in the otherwise decades-long spirit of teamwork and friendship on the mountain.

Earlier in the day, the three European climbers on the Lhotse Face had crossed over lines being laid by the Sherpas, contrary to the etiquette that climbers should avoid Sherpas working on the mountain. Words were exchanged and the situation escalated. An ice pick was brandished and ice and stones were thrown. The Sherpas then left the Lhotse Face, but later visited the camp site with about 100 others and threatened to kill one of the three climbers. The climber was upset because he considered himself a friend of the Sherpa community, had built a school for nearly 400 Sherpa children, and also had funded free evacuations via helicopters for Sherpas. Again, Sherpas deny that there were any threats to life made and that the initial assault was made by Marty Schmidt, a guide for Kiwi Peak Freaks, who at the time was claiming that he was Simone Moro, one of the climbers involved in the dispute, despite Schmidt not having been involved.

The Nepalese government said if climbers were attacked, action would be taken against the aggressors. An official from the Nepal tourism ministry described the attack as a misunderstanding that had been sorted out and pledged to ensure the safety of climbers. The three ringleaders of the attack were removed from the mountain. Sherpas are renowned for the most part for their climbing skill and demeanour, with one Everest climber noting, "To a man everyone seems to be absolutely impressed with the Sherpas. Not just their strength on the mountain, which is legendary, but their personalities and their friendliness. They become your friends." The fight led to improved communication between the people on the mountain, which helped to overcome the cultural and language barriers that complicated an already difficult environment.

== Fatalities ==
There were 8 fatalities attributed to mountaineering. One of the losses was the well-known and respected Russian climber, Alexi Bolotov, who died in the Khumbu Icefall when the rope he was rappelling down broke.
