= Joby Ogwyn =

American mountain climber, BASE jumper and Wingsuit flyer

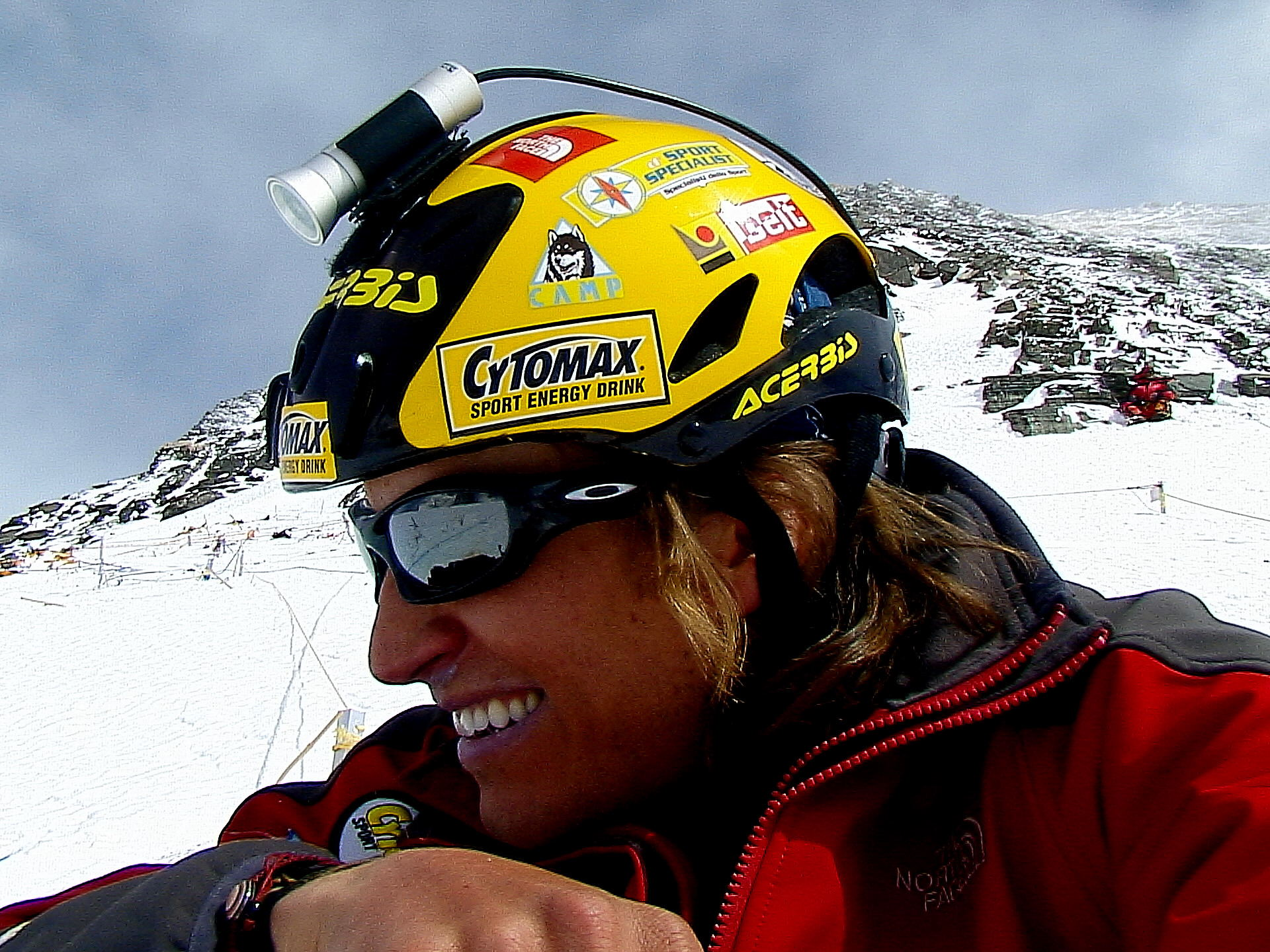
- Born: August 25, 1974 (age 52); Shreveport, Louisiana
- Education: Centenary College of Louisiana
- Occupation: Mountaineer

Joby Ogwyn (/ˈdʒoʊbi ˈoʊɡwɪn/ JOH-bee OH-gwin; born August 25, 1974) is an American mountain climber, BASE jumper and Wingsuit flyer.

== Early life ==
Ogwyn grew up in Shreveport, Louisiana and studied business administration at the Centenary College of Louisiana.

== Mountaineering ==
He summited Mount Kilimanjaro when he was just 18. When he first summited Mount Everest in 1999, he was at the time the youngest American to do so. He is a top speed climber. In 2004 Ogwyn beat the speed ascent record of an 8,000 meter peak at the Tibetan peak Cho Oyu.

Ogwyn planned to jump off Mount Everest in a wingsuit in May 2014, but after the 2014 Mount Everest avalanche on Everest's lower slopes during the month of April, causing the deaths of 16 Sherpa guides, the jump was cancelled.
