= Shriya Shah-Klorfine =

Nepal-born Canadian mountain climber

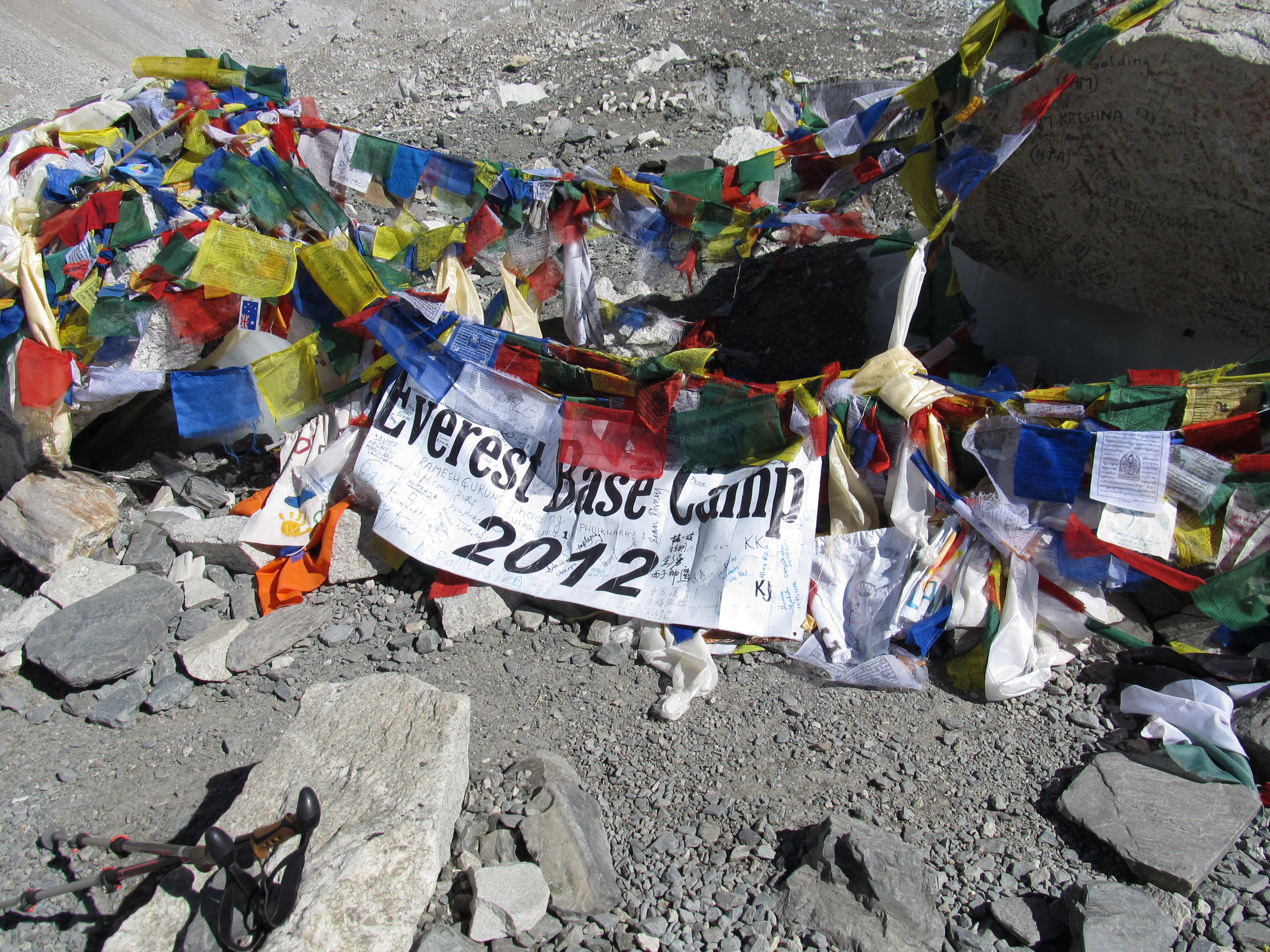
Everest Base Camp South Nepal 2012 01

Shriya Shah-Klorfine (January 11, 1979 – May 19, 2012) was a Nepal-born Canadian woman who died while descending from the summit of Mount Everest in 2012.

== Early life ==
Shah-Klorfine was born in Kathmandu, Nepal, according to CityNews. At the age of nine, Shah-Klorfine had taken a helicopter tour of Mount Everest with her father. She attended Tribhuvan University in Kathmandu, Nepal.

She grew up in Mumbai, India, which she left to work on cruise ships as a purser. While working on a cruise ship, she met her future husband, Bruce Klorfine, who was a jazz and event piano player. They married and settled in his hometown of Toronto, Canada, where she became a fashion buyer for the Fairweather women's clothing chain. They were together for about a decade before she died on Everest.

Shah-Klorfine was also a businesswoman who started "SOS Splash of Style Inc." She was also a candidate during the 2011 Ontario general election in the riding of Mississauga East—Cooksville.

== Everest experience ==
Shah-Klorfine had booked a climb with Utmost Adventure Trekking, which was a new guiding company. The cost of the climb was reportedly $36,000 to $40,000, which was on the lower end of what other guide firms had charged. The total cost after adding in airfare and equipment was around $100,000. Shah-Klorfine solicited donations via the website myeverestexpedition.com, which included a digitally-altered photo of her purportedly in front of Mount Everest, and also organized several fundraising events, which raised little or lost money. As a result, her expedition was financed by taking out a second mortgage on her home.

Neither she nor the guide firm had significant climbing experience. The leader of the guide firm said he had asked her not to try to summit on that day, and previously warned her she was a below-average climber. However, another guide firm said she was not given enough bottled oxygen. One issue noted by the guide firm and other climbers that day was long waiting times on the mountain, caused by slow passage through certain bottlenecks on the climbing route. The 2012 season was noted as the worst since 1996, with about 11 deaths for the season.

The Himalayan Database records that she died on May 19, 2012, on the south side of Mount Everest at 8400 meters altitude. Further fatalities that season include two on the north side and seven on the south side, with four other deaths on the same day as Shah-Klorfine. She is said to have died 250 meters (~820 feet) from Camp IV (Nepal side). She was 33 years old.

The day after she died, climber Leanne Shuttleworth came across her body. Shuttleworth and her father, with whom she was climbing, had to go around Shah-Klorfine's body, as she was still clipped to the climbing line. Her body was on the mountain for about ten days before it was carried back down. The body was retrieved from an altitude of over 8000 meters and then taken off the mountain by helicopter. She was cremated in a Hindu temple in Kathmandu in late May. On July 8, 2012, a memorial service was ministered for her at a church in Toronto, Canada.

=== Legacy ===
In 2012 Canadian journalist Bob McKeown travelled to Nepal with the goal of piecing together what happened. He released a documentary on the subject of his investigation which included video of Shah-Klorfine's final hours on Everest.

Shah-Klorfine has been noted as a case of the pros and cons of risk taking. The Vancouver Sun noted that dangerous adventures can offer achievement, but that danger can also result in death. An Everest summiteer who was Canadian noted the cruel dangers of mountain climbing.

Another analysis questioned the common sense of a novice going with an inexperienced guiding firm, also noting that there has been an increase in "tourists" attempting to summit mountains like Everest to seek glory despite their lack of ability. Widely resented by professional mountaineers, the "tourists" are seen as clogging out routes and being a potential danger to themselves and others, while their self-promotional behaviour also violates alpine traditions.

== See also ==
- List of people who died climbing Mount Everest
- Mount Everest in 2012
