= 1970 Mount Everest disaster =

Avalanche on Mount Everest

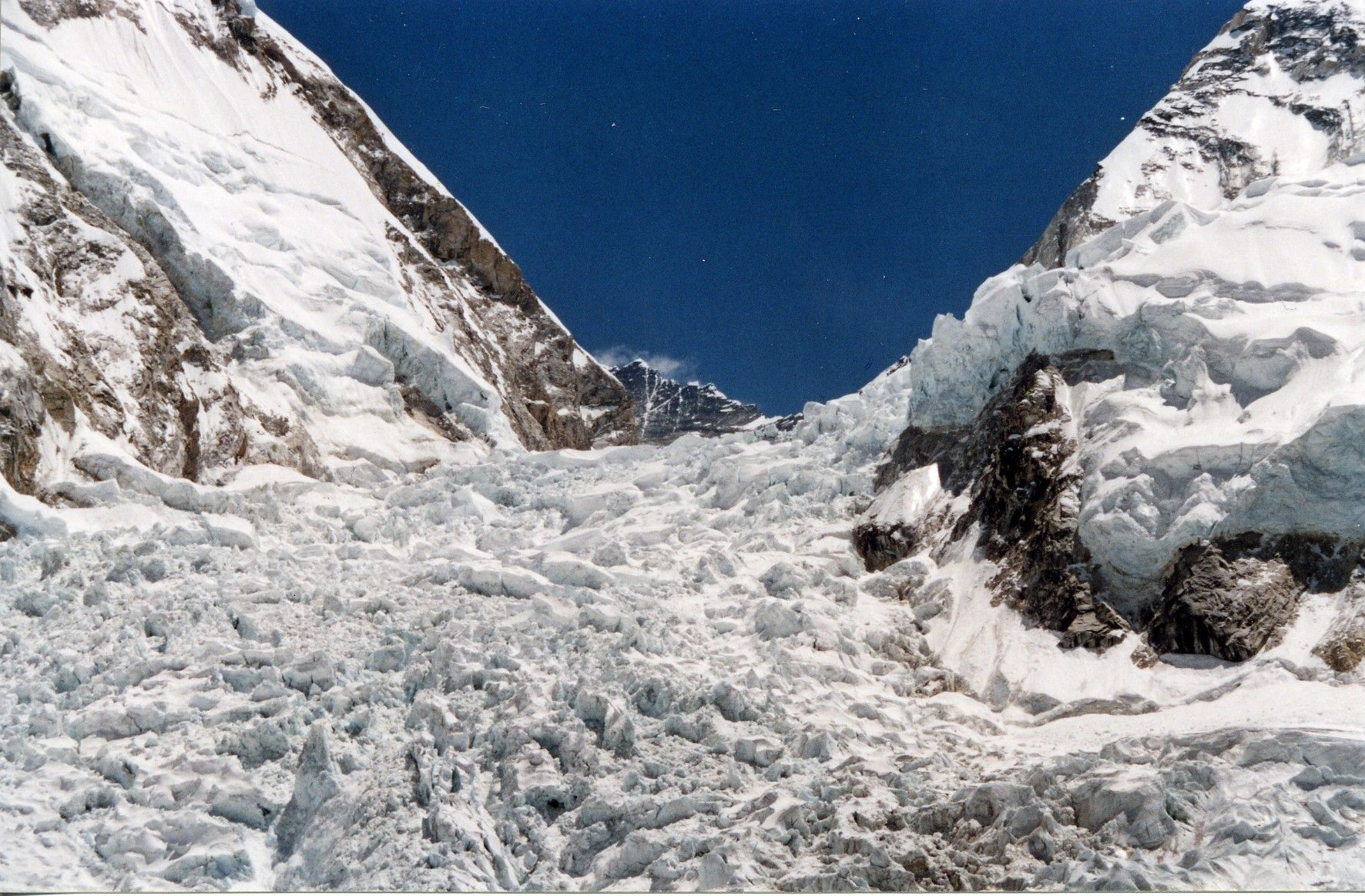
- The Khumbu Icefall in 2005
- Date: 5 April 1970
- Location: Khumbu Icefall, Mount Everest; 27°59′32″N 86°52′38″E
- Cause: Avalanche
- Deaths: 6

On 5 April 1970, an avalanche killed six Nepalese Sherpa porters on the Khumbu Icefall of Mount Everest. The porters were assisting the Japanese Everest Skiing Expedition 1970 climbing expedition. Four days later Sherpa Kyak Tsering, a porter on a different Japanese Mt. Everest expedition, (Note: The "Japanese Mount Everest Expedition", focused solely on ascending the summit of Everest, the other being "The Japanese Everest Skiing Expedition 1970", as depicted in the film The Man Who Skied Down Everest.) was killed by ice falling from a serac. Later, Yūichirō Miura, the focus of the film expedition, became the first person to ski down Everest.

The icefall, which lies between Base Camp and Camp I, has been the site of numerous fatalities, including those in the 2014 Mount Everest ice avalanche. The six 1970 victims were Mima Norbu, Nima Dorje, Tshering Tarkey, Pasang, Kunga Norbu, and Kami Tshering.

== See also ==
- List of deaths on the Eight Thousanders
- 1974 French Mount Everest expedition (French West ridge expedition)
- List of Mount Everest expeditions
