= Min Bahadur Sherchan =

Nepalese mountaineer

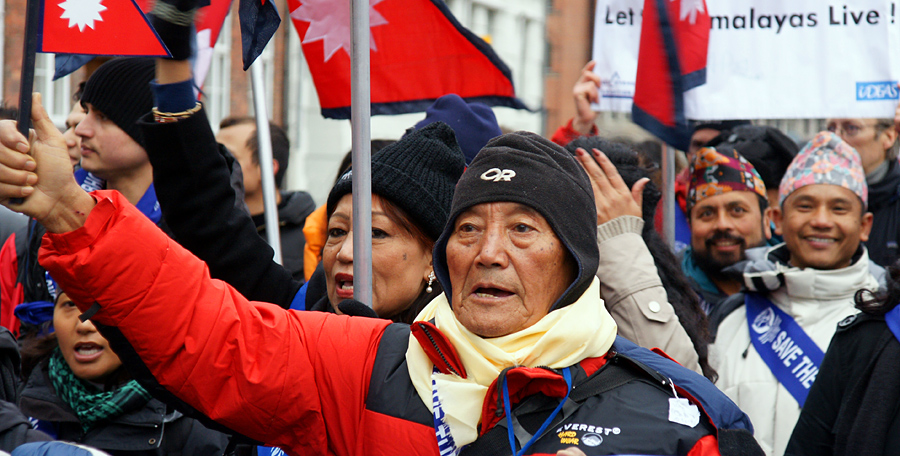
- Sherchan in Copenhagen in 2009

Personal information
- Full name: Min Bahadur Sherchan
- Nationality: Nepalese
- Born: 20 June 1931 Bhurung Tatopani, West Nepal
- Died: 6 May 2017 (aged 85) Everest Base Camp, Nepal

Min Bahadur Sherchan (20 June 1931 – 6 May 2017) was a Nepalese climber and former British Gurkha soldier. In 2008, the 76-year-old became the oldest person to summit Mount Everest. He lost the record in 2013 to 80-year-old Japanese climber Yūichirō Miura. Sherchan died at Everest Base Camp on 6 May 2017 while trying to reclaim his title.

In 2008 Min Bahadur Sherchan beat Yuichiro Miura to the top by one day. Sherchan tried to summit again in 2013, but had to call off his attempt due to health issues. Prior to this, the oldest was Katsusuke Yanagisawa, who at 71 summited on 22 May 2007. In this period, Nepal set a minimum age limit of 16 years old (there was no maximum), and a 2005 study found Everest climbers over age 60 had about a 1 in 10 chance of summiting compared to the 1 in 3 chance of those under 60. People over 60 who summitted also had a 1 in 4 chance of dying on the way down.

Sherchan was born in Myagdi district of Nepal. His funeral was held in Kathmandu, Nepal.

== See also ==
- List of Mount Everest records
- List of people who died climbing Mount Everest
- Mount Everest in 2017
- List of world records from Nepal
