= Arts Schools Network =

American non-profit art association

Arts Schools Network (ASN) is a non-profit professional association founded in 1981.(www.artsschoolsnetwork.org

== History ==
In 1981, the Los Angeles Unified School District was planning to open a new school for the arts. The superintendent, assisted by Joan Boyette of the Music Center Education Division of Los Angeles, invited twelve arts school administrators to meet in Los Angeles in April 1981 to help in the planning. This was the first time these twelve administrators had all met together. They included leaders of the country’s most prestigious art schools: James Nelson, Alabama School of Fine Arts, Birmingham, AL; Daryl Chambers, Booker T. Washington High School for the Arts, Dallas, TX; William Dickinson, School for Creative and Performing Arts, Cincinnati, OH; Gail Thompson, Educational Center for the Arts, New Haven, CN; Maurice Eldridge, Duke Ellington School of the Arts, Washington, DC; William Lawrence, English High School of Visual and Performing Arts, Boston, MA; Mary Martha Lappe, High School for Performing and Visual Arts, Houston, TX; Karen Carroll, Hope High School, Providence, RI; Roger Jacobi, Interlochen Arts Academy, Interlochen, MI; Richard Klein, LaGuardia High School of Music and Art, New York, NY; Thomas Tews, New Orleans Center for Creative Arts, New Orleans, LA; Jane van Hoven, North Carolina School of the Arts, Winston-Salem, NC.

From this and subsequent meetings, a planning committee, chaired by Maurice Eldridge, Duke Ellington School of the Arts, was created to draft bylaws and appoint officers. The first annual conference, held in October 1983, was hosted by James Undercofler and the Educational Center for the Arts in New Haven, CT. Representatives from fifty schools attended.

The Arts Schools Network's membership includes more than 300 member schools, art school administrators, art teachers, and arts-related organizations in the U.S. and other countries around the world.

== 2010 Board of Directors ==
=== Executive committee ===
- Ralph S. Opacic, Ed.D. – President Founder, President, and Executive Director of Orange County High School of the Arts (Los Angeles, CA);
- Tim Wade – 1st Vice President, Vice President for Student Affairs, Interlochen Center for the Arts (Interlochen, MI);
- Craig Collins – 2nd Vice President, principal at Harrison School for the Arts (Lakeland, FL);
- Rory Pullens – Secretary, Head of School/Chief Executive Officer at Duke Ellington School of the Arts (Washington, DC);
- Bill Barrett – Treasurer, Executive Director of the Association of Independent Colleges of Art & Design (San Francisco, CA);
- Dr. Denise Davis Cotton – Immediate Past President, Founder of Detroit School of Arts (Detroit, MI).

=== Directors ===
- R. Scott Allen, Ph.D., Principal of High School for the Performing and Visual Arts (Houston, TX);
- Kim Bruno, Principal, Fiorello H. LaGuardia High School of Music & Art and Performing Arts (New York, NY);
- Jackie Cornelius, Executive Director of Fine Arts for the Duval County School District (Jacksonville, Fl);
- Patricia Decker, Director of Recruitment at New York University's Tisch School of the Arts (New York, NY);
- Dorothy Marshall Englis, Chair of The Conservatory of Theatre Arts at Webster University (St. Louis, MO);
- David A. Flatley, Executive Director of the Center for Community Arts Partnerships at Columbia College Chicago (Chicago, IL);
- Dr. Roy S. Fluhrer, Director of Greenville County School District's Fine Arts Center (Greenville, SC);
- Donn K. Harris, Executive Director of the Oakland School for the Arts (Oakland, CA);
- Dr. Suzy Highland, Academic Counselor at the New Orleans Center for Creative Arts (New Orleans, LA);
- Pamela Jordan, Head of School, Chicago Academy for the Arts (Chicago, IL);
- Carol Kim, Dean of Enrollment Management at California Institute of the Arts (Valencia, CA);
- Mary Martha Lappe, Executive Director of HSPVA Friends (Houston, TX);
- William Lowman, President of the Idyllwild Arts Foundation (Idyllwild, CA);
- Tom Sherry, Design Principal at Hamilton Anderson Associates (Detroit, MI);
- George Simpson, Principal of Los Angeles County High School for the Arts (Los Angeles, CA);
- Robin Speer, Coordinator for Riverside Performing Arts High School at Ramona High School (Riverside, CA).

== Staff ==
=== Managing Director ===
Nicole Michel, 2026-Present, Dr. R. Scott Allen, 2021-2026, Melissa Brookes, 2017-2021

=== Conference Manager ===
- Sharon Maier-Williams, 2026-Present, , Travis Springfield, 2025-2026, William "Bill" Kohut, 2020-2025

=== Membership Manager ===
- Laurie Barber, 2020-Present

== Programs ==
=== ASN Live! ===
A series of live interactive webcasts offered in partnership with Entertainment Business Education (EBE).

Broadcast from the Duke Ellington School of the Arts in Washington, D.C., the series features panels of top executives and artists in the fields of dance, music, theater, film, writing, television, and the visual arts, who share information on innermost workings of the entertainment business. EBE CEO/President, Haqq Islam, serves as moderator for the webcast series.

Speakers and panelists in the live webcasts include entertainment industry executives, producers, managers, agents, and stylists discussing such topics as: • How to launch, grow, and maintain an arts or entertainment career • How to protect intellectual property • The importance of good representation, i.e., managers, attorneys, publicists, and stylists • How to establish and run an entertainment facility • The experience, discipline, and structure for achieving goals in everyday life.

=== Annual Conference ===
The annual conference is the major programmatic vehicle of the Arts Schools Network. The conference provides opportunities to: 1. Meet other professional educators; 2. share experiences and ideas; 3. learn from arts and arts education experts and researchers through attendance at lectures, workshops, and presentations; and 4. experience quality student performances.

The 2009-10 ASN annual conference was held in Washington DC, sponsored by the Duke Ellington School of the Arts. The next conference will be on Jan. 10-16, 2011 in Anaheim, California, and is sponsored by Disney Entertainment Productions and NAMM, the International Music Products Association. Orlando, Florida will be the site of the 2012 conference, also to be sponsored by Disney Entertainment Productions.

=== Best Practices in Teaching and Learning ===
Focus Areas: Networking, Continuous Improvement, Recognition, and Professional Development; Target Groups: Schools and Their Leaders, Faculty, and Students

Interim Chair, Rory Pullens, Duke Ellington School of the Arts

=== Leadership ===
Focus Areas: Facilities Planning, Fundraising and Marketing, Board Development and Partnerships, Building Capacity and Succession Planning, and Innovative Leadership/Institute

Chair, Donn K. Harris, Oakland School for the Arts

=== Teaching In and Through the Arts ===
Focus Areas: ASN Board Development, Definitions, Identify Models, Develop Partnerships, and Promotion of Excellence

Chair, David Flatley, Center for Community Arts Partnerships

=== Awards ===
The following awards are presented at the annual conference to ASN members, affiliates, or associates recognizing excellence in arts education and leadership: • Arts Innovation Award • Community Partnership Award • New and Emerging School Award • Outstanding Arts School Alum Achievement Award • Outstanding Arts School Award • Research Initiative: Individual Award • Research Initiative: School Award • Teacher of the Year Award • The Jeffrey Lawrence Award
