= Sagarmatha Friendship 2017 =

Sagarmatha Friendship 2017 was the first joint army drill between armies of Nepal and China. It was hosted in Nepal by the Nepali Army in 2017 at Kathmandu based Maharajgunj Training School. The joint drill was focused in counter insurgency and counter terrorism. The drill lasted for 10 days from 16 to 25 April 2017. The drill was inaugurated by Major General Binod Kumar Shrestha from the Nepali army and Colonel Yang Shumeng from the People's Liberation Army of China. A 22-member delegation from the Chinese special force led by Colonel Yang Shumeng had come to join the training. The initial planned size was a battalion-scale military exercises, however, due to opposition from India, the drill was scaled down.

Nepal had proposed joint military exercises during Chinese Defence Minister General Chang Wanquan’s official visit to Nepal on March 24, 2017.

The drill was concluded by Lieutenant General Baldev Raj Mahat and Major General Zhang Jiangang.
