= 2014 Mount Everest ice avalanche =

Avalanche on Mount Everest

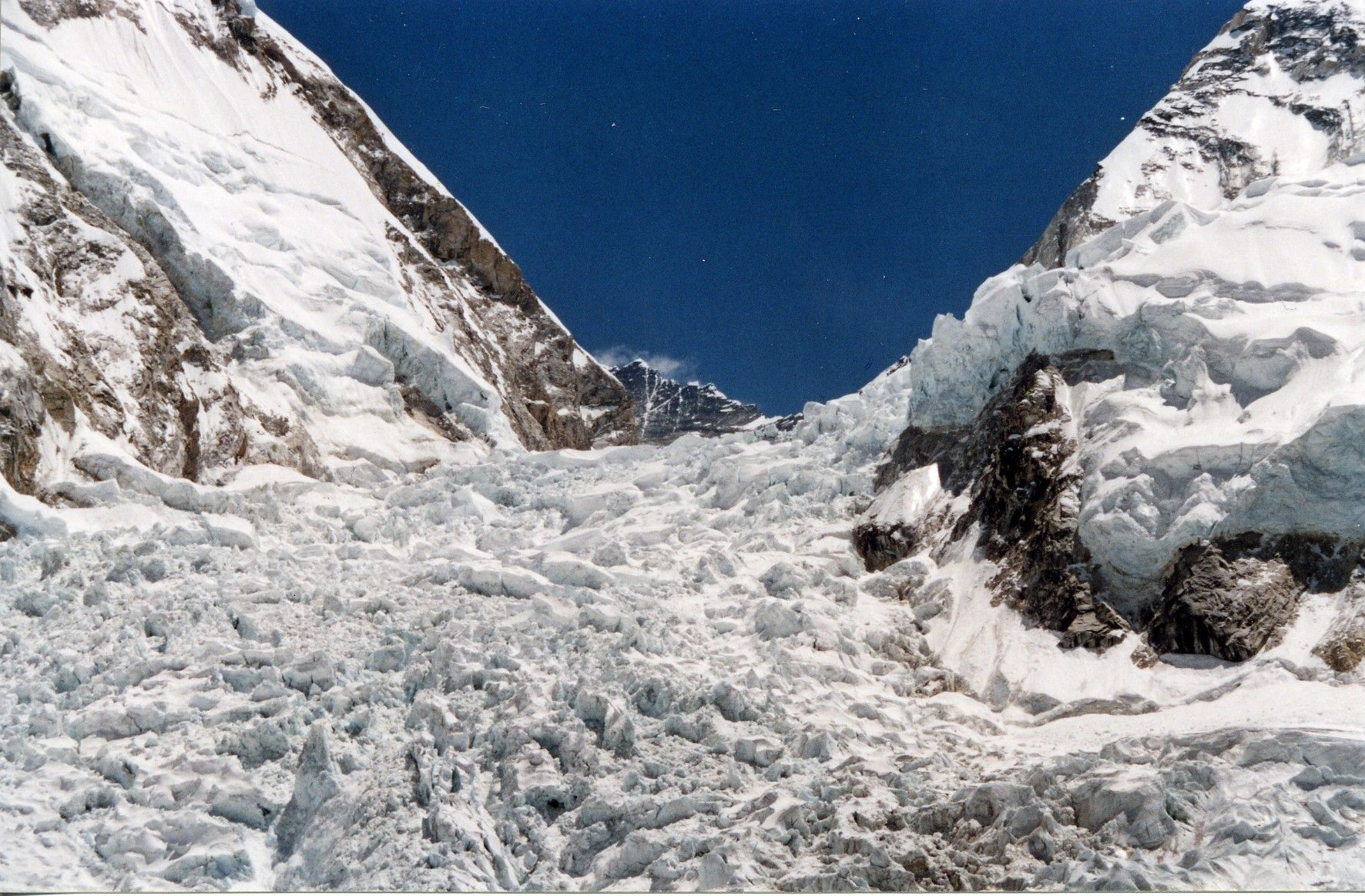
- The Khumbu Icefall in 2005. The ice avalanche came from a serac fall from an ice bulge on Mount Everest's western shoulder (centre left), above the icefall.
- Date: 18 April 2014
- Time: 06:45 local time (01:00 UTC)
- Location: Khumbu Icefall, Mount Everest; 27°59′32″N 86°52′38″E
- Cause: Avalanche
- Deaths: 16
- Injuries: 9

On 18 April 2014, seracs on the western spur of Mount Everest failed, resulting in an ice avalanche that killed sixteen climbing Sherpas in the Khumbu Icefall. This was the same icefall where the 1970 Mount Everest disaster had taken place. Thirteen bodies were recovered within two days, while the remaining three were never recovered due to the great danger in attempting such an expedition. Many Sherpas were angered by what they saw as the Nepalese government's meager offer of compensation to victims' families, and threatened a protest or strike. On 22 April, the Sherpas announced they would not work on Everest for the remainder of 2014 as a mark of respect for the victims.

== Background ==
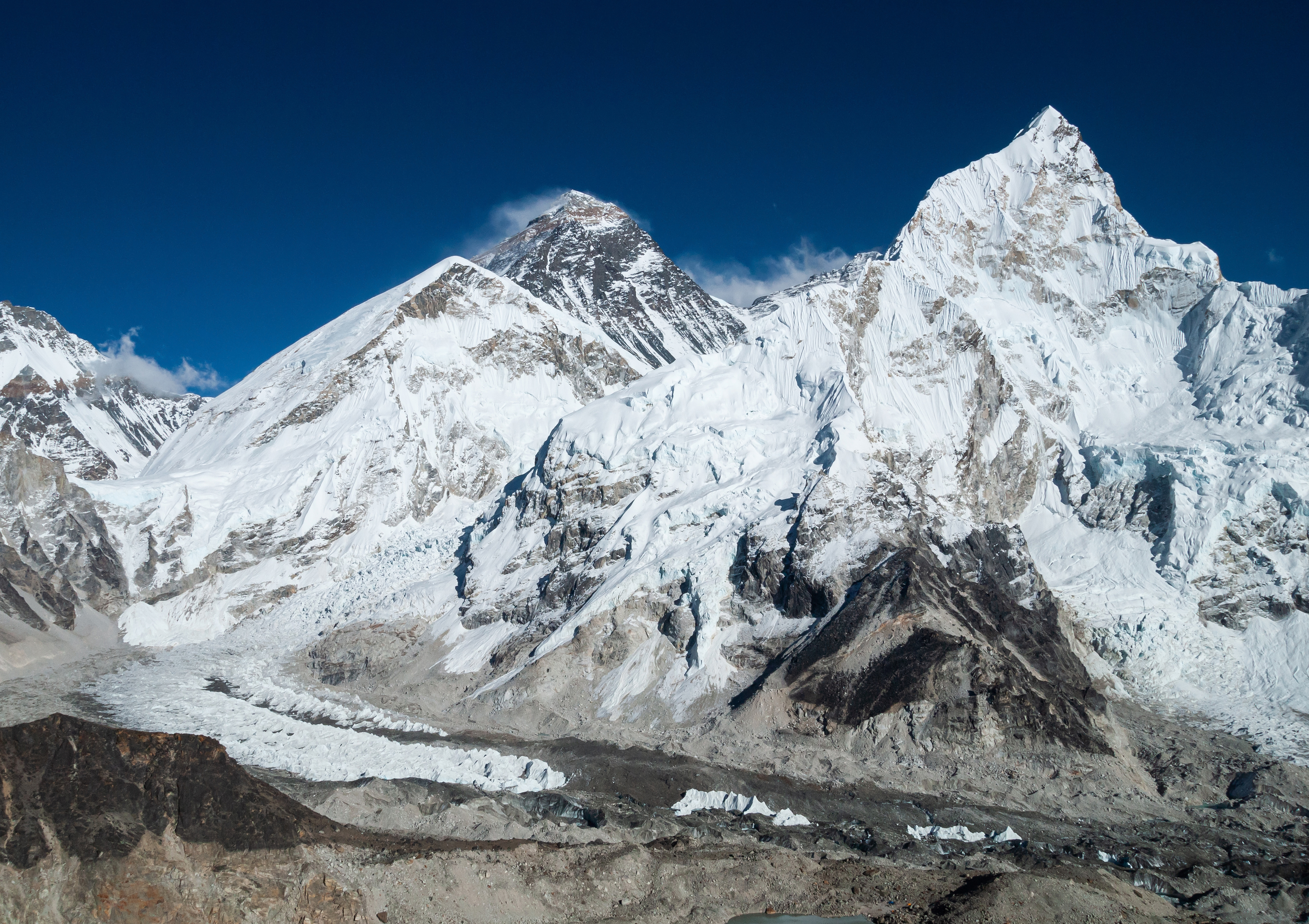
Khumbu Icefall, Everest West Shoulder and Mount Everest as seen from Kala Patthar

=== Guide employment on Mount Everest ===
During the two month long climbing season on Mount Everest, 350 to 450 people, mostly men from the Nepalese Sherpa ethnic group, are hired to assist mostly foreign climbers to reach the summit. Although the term Sherpa normally refers to the ethnic group, many people refer to all of the mountaineering guides working on Everest (who may be, for example, West Indian) as "Sherpas", regardless of ethnicity. A Sherpa who works as a porter on Mount Everest, specialised in high-altitude work including rope fixing, typically earns about US$125/day per climb. Most come from climbing families, are raised on stories of wealth earned from expeditions, and have relatively few other economic opportunities. Working as a guide for foreign climbers can bring in up to $5,000 a year; by contrast, Nepal's average annual salary is about $700.

In the years prior to the disaster, foreigners began bringing their own guides, causing tension with locals. Eight people, including one of the most experienced Sherpa guides, died on Mount Everest in 2013.

=== Concerns over Khumbu Icefall route ===
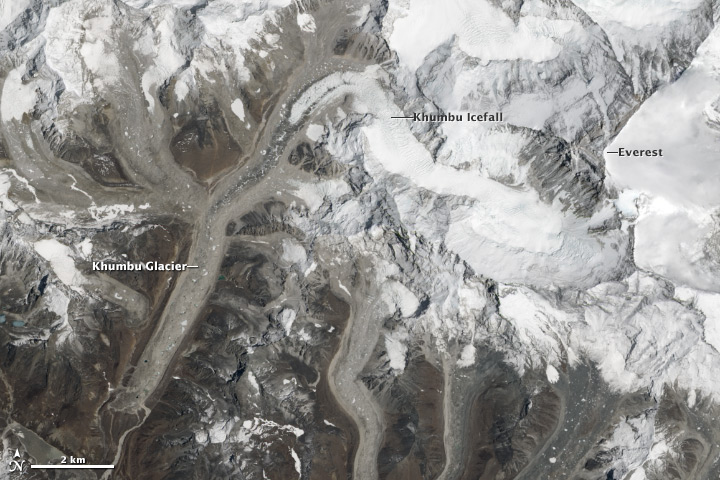
Khumbu Glacier + Khumbu Icefall + Mount Everest

The presence of numerous unstable blocks of ice (called seracs) in and above the Khumbu Icefall encourages climbers to try to pass through as quickly as possible, usually in the very early morning before temperatures rise and loosen the ice. In the spring of 2012 Russell Brice, of the guiding company Himex, called off guided ascents run by his company due to safety concerns. He was worried about the stability of a 300 metres (980 ft) wide ice cliff, or ice bulge, on Mount Everest's western shoulder that could endanger the route through the Khumbu Icefall, if it collapsed. "When I see around 50 people moving underneath the cliff at one time," he commented, "it scares me." However, Brice and Himex returned to the south side of Everest for the 2014 climbing season. Mountaineer Alan Arnette reported that this ice bulge had been a known hazard for years and had discharged ice into the Khumbu Icefall almost every season. He added that, "In 2012 it narrowly missed many climbers." According to writer and mountaineer Jon Krakauer, the 2014 ice avalanche was triggered when a block of ice "the size of a Beverly Hills mansion" broke off from the bulge.

Conditions change regularly with the glacier's shifting ice, so climbing guides must find and maintain a new route through the icefall each season.

== Ice avalanche ==
At approximately 06:45 local time (01:00 UTC, 18 April 2014), an ice avalanche occurred on the southern side of Mount Everest, at an elevation of approximately 5,800 metres (19,000 ft). Twenty-five men, mostly Sherpas, were buried in the avalanche. The group was fixing ropes and preparing the South Col route for fee-paying climbers during the upcoming climbing season. The accident zone, locally known as "the Golden Gate" or "Popcorn Field", lies within the Khumbu Icefall.

The ice avalanche came from a large serac breaking off on the slopes of Mount Everest's western shoulder. Despite most reporting, this was not an avalanche in the usual sense of the word as there was little snow involved and the large blocks of serac ice behave much more like a rockfall. The serac was estimated to have been 34.5 meters (113 ft) thick and to have had a mass of 14,300 tonnes (31.5 million pounds). Though there have been calls for construction of defensive structures, they are impossible on the scale necessary.

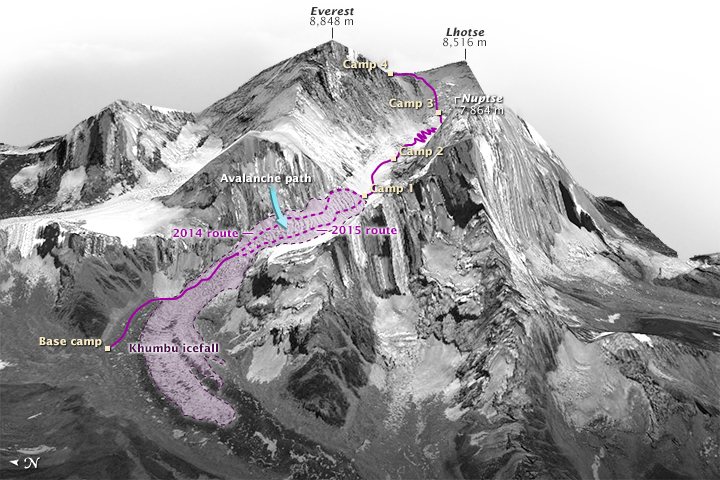
This labeled photo-diagram shows the location of the fatal ice avalanche on the 2014 route, and the revised 2015 route through the Khumbu.

== Victims ==
2014
Victims
Mingma Nuru Sherpa
Dorji Sherpa
Ang Tshiri Sherpa
Nima Sherpa
Phurba Ongyal Sherpa
Lakpa Tenjing Sherpa
Chhiring Ongchu Sherpa
Dorjee Khatri
Then Dorjee Sherpa
Phur Temba Sherpa
Pasang Karma Sherpa
Asman Tamang
Tenzing Chottar Sherpa
Ankaji Sherpa
Pem Tenji Sherpa
Ash Bahadur Gurung

Sixteen people died in the disaster. Thirteen bodies were recovered within 48 hours, when search and rescue operations were called off due to "too much risk". Three victims are still buried in roughly 80 to 100 metres (260 to 330 ft) of snow and ice. Nine other guides were also injured, including three who required intensive-care hospitalisation.

Four fatalities were Sherpas from Nepal's Solukhumbu District. Five were working for Discovery Channel, preparing for an upcoming special in which Joby Ogwyn was planning to attempt a BASE jump from the mountain. No foreigners were killed. According to mountaineer Tim Rippel, the victims were moving slowly and carrying large "loads of equipment, tents, stoves, oxygen and so on up to stock camps" when the avalanche occurred. The Sherpas had started out in early morning but were delayed by poor climbing conditions. The second unit crew of disaster movie Everest (2015) were filming nearby, but suffered no injuries or fatalities; Sherpas involved with the film's production gave assistance after the avalanche. In total, the search and rescue team included nine Sherpas and three foreigners.

The 2014 disaster is the second-deadliest disaster in Everest's history, only superseded by avalanches that struck the southern side of the mountain the following year, on 25 April 2015, triggered by a magnitude 7.8 earthquake in Nepal.

== Reactions ==
Rippel reported "everyone is shaken here at base camp". Some of the climbers immediately packed up their belongings and left.

In addition to mandatory insurance policies paying US$10,000 to guides' families, the Nepalese government announced compensation of Nepali Rs. 40,000 ($400) each as immediate relief to the victims' next of kin. This government offering, which only covers funeral costs, angered Sherpas and was dismissed by the Nepal Mountaineering Association (NMA). The NMA announced they would stop work in seven days' time if compensation of US$10,000 were not paid to families of the dead, injured and missing. They further demanded a memorial to the dead, the doubling of insurance coverage to $20,000 and government payment of medical bills. According to unverified reports, 350 guides voted to suspend operations on Everest. Other reports said the guides agreed to unspecified "strong protests".

On 21 April, eight of the dead were ceremoniously driven through Kathmandu and then cremated in a Buddhist religious ceremony. On 22 April, the Sherpas announced they would not work on Everest for the rest of 2014 out of respect for the victims. Tulsi Gurung said: "We had a long meeting this afternoon and we decided to stop our climbing this year to honour our fallen brothers. All Sherpas are united in this." The fate of 334 climbing permits sold at $10,000 each is uncertain. By 24 April, almost all expeditions had decided to abandon their climbing plans; the 600 mountaineers who were at Base Camp before the avalanche was down to 40 or 50.

On 23 April, the Nepalese government announced it would give an additional 500,000 Nepali Rs. (approx. US$5,100) to the families of the dead climbers. Although these funds started to be paid in December 2014, it was reported in January 2015 that the bereaved Sherpa families were further angered because the money could only be obtained if they presented documentation in Kathmandu, which is impossible for many of those who live in the Khumbu region.

Discovery cancelled Ogwyn's planned BASE jump shortly after the ice avalanche struck, and announced it would broadcast a documentary about the tragedy. Entitled Everest Avalanche Tragedy, the 90-minute programme was shown on 4 May. The company also said it would make a donation to the American Himalayan Foundation Sherpa Family Fund, a charity supporting the families of those who died in the disaster.

Following the accident, the NMA president Ang Tsering Sherpa proposed installing avalanche-prevention barriers similar to those found above European ski resorts. He said: "We should ... adopt some precautionary measure – learning from [how] mountains [are managed] in developed countries where they adopt measures to avoid avalanches by putting some kind of wood or some concrete so that it helps make it safe." It is very doubtful however if any defensive structures are feasible for events of this size.

The 2015 documentary Sherpa explores reactions to the avalanche after filmmakers were on location when it occurred.

== Effects and aftermath ==
Years in Review Summary
Year	Summiters	Reference(s)
2012	547	
2013	658	
2014	106	
2015	0	
2016	641	
2017	648	
2018	801	

=== Post-disaster ascents in 2014 ===
The first post-avalanche ascent of Mount Everest via the South Col route was on 23 May 2014, by Chinese businesswoman Wang Jing, together with five sherpas. Her ascent sparked controversy, as she bypassed the Khumbu Icefall by helicopter, which took her to 6,400 m (21,000 ft); this decision was made because the 2014 ropes and ladders had been removed. She made her ascent without new rope lines, and beyond the usual 14:00 cut-off time, and made her descent in the dark. Tamding Sherpa, the leader of the team that Wang was planning to use before her original expedition was called off as a result of the disaster, stated that he considered her ascent to be "cheating".

=== Changes in 2015 ===
As a result of the dangers of the normal route up the left side of the icefall, the Nepali authorities announced in February 2015 that a new route, up the centre of the icefall, would be followed instead. According to the director of the Nepali government’s Department of Tourism, Tulasi Prasad Gautam, "In response to the last year’s avalanche we are trying to make Everest climbing a little safer by avoiding the old route."

In addition, the insurance for each Sherpa in 2015 was raised from $11,000 to $15,000.

== See also ==
- List of deaths on eight-thousanders
- List of people who died climbing Mount Everest
- 1970 Mount Everest disaster
- Sherpa (film)
