= 2015 Mount Everest avalanches =

2015 mountaineering disaster

Coordinates: 28°13′52″N 84°43′52″E

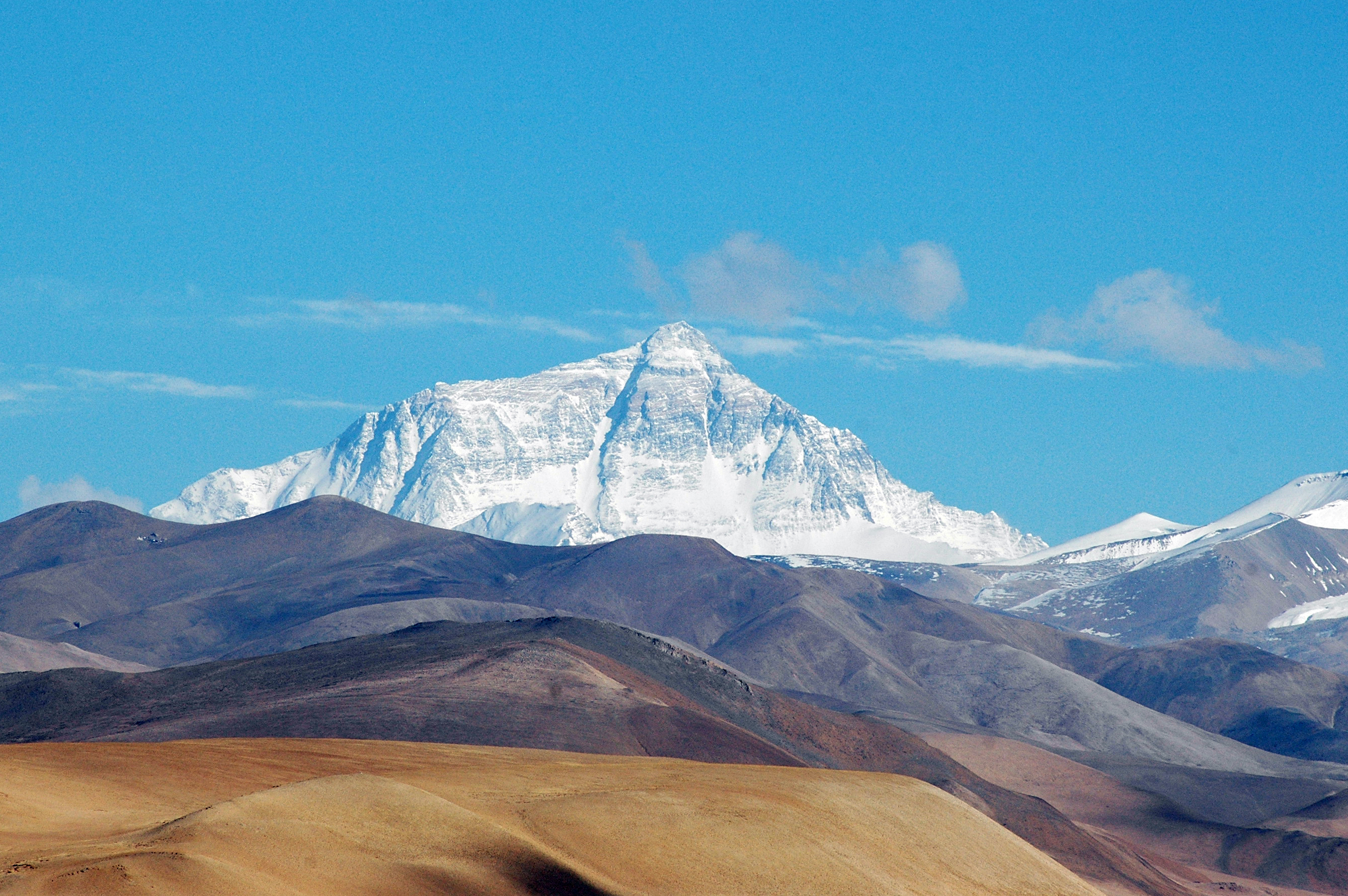
- The North Face of Everest as seen from Tibet
- Date: 25 April 2015
- Location: Base Camp, Mount Everest
- Cause: Avalanche
- Deaths: 24
- Injuries: 61

In the afternoon of 25 April 2015, a 7.8 moment magnitude earthquake struck Nepal and surrounding countries. Tremors from the quake triggered an avalanche from Pumori into Base Camp on Mount Everest. At least 24 people were killed, surpassing the toll of an avalanche that occurred in 2014 as the deadliest disaster on the mountain.

== Avalanches ==
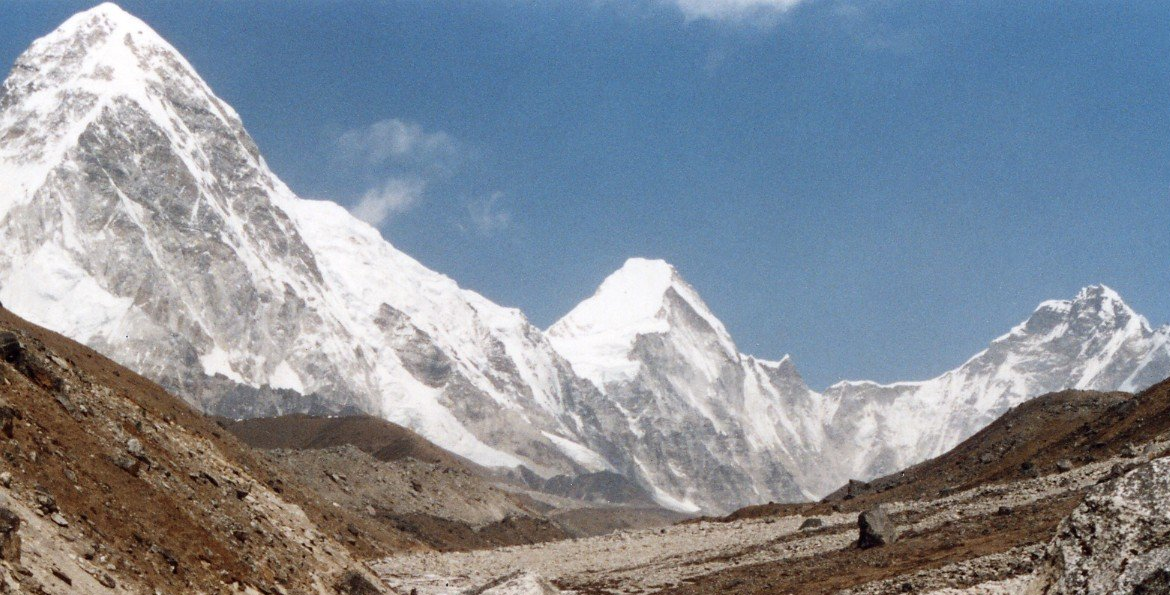
The avalanche is reported to have started between Pumori (Left) and Lingtren (middle peak) Khumbutse to the right

Mount Everest was approximately 220 kilometres (140 miles) east of the epicentre, and between 700 and 1,000 people were on or near the mountain when the earthquake struck, including 359 climbers at Base Camp, many of whom had returned after the aborted 2014 season. The earthquake triggered several large avalanches on and around the mountain. One avalanche, originating on the nearby peak of Pumori, swept into Base Camp and blew many tents across the Khumbu Glacier towards the lower Icefall. An Indian Army mountaineering team recovered the bodies of 19 mountaineers from the South Base Camp and rescued at least 61 stranded climbers from the mountain.

At least 61 people were injured, with dozens initially reported missing, and many more stranded at camps at higher elevations, having lost secure descent routes.

== Rescue operations ==
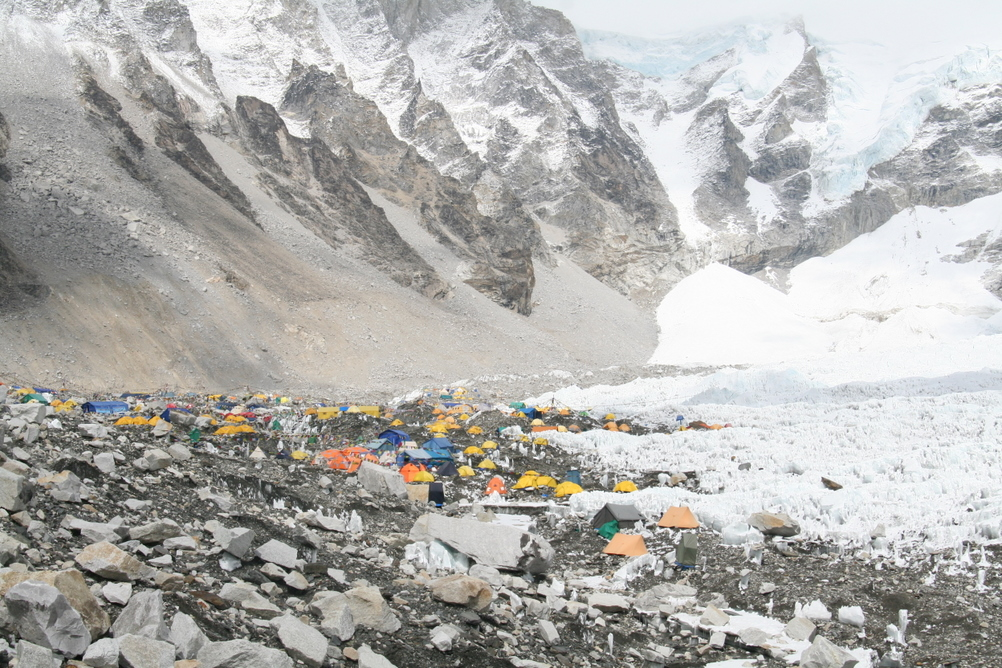
Nepal side Everest Base camp

Helicopters reached Mount Everest on the morning of 26 April to commence rescue operations, managing to transport 22 of the badly injured to Pheriche village, before the operation was halted by bad weather. Pheriche is an important stopover for climbers, and has a rudimentary hospital staffed by volunteer doctors from the Himalayan Rescue Association.

Later that day, a helicopter reportedly evacuated several climbers from Camp I, the first camp above Base Camp, with some 100 mountaineers still unable to safely descend from Camps I and II. Expedition leaders decided to try to evacuate climbers from Camp I by repairing the route through the Khumbu Icefall. On 26 April, a helicopter dropped additional technical gear at Camp I, and a team of Sherpas and foreign guides attempted to re-establish the route from the top back down to Base Camp. Simultaneously, another team dispatched from Base Camp tried to re-establish the route from the bottom up. But this attempt was unsuccessful as a subsequent avalanche took out most of the ladders and reportedly killed three Sherpas at Khumbu Icefall, pushing the death toll on the mountain to at least 24. Further climbers were rescued via helicopter on 27 April. Climbers at Base Camp posted on Twitter in the days after the disaster, writing of "great desolation" and "high uncertainty" among those who were left, and stating that the area looked as if it had been hit by a nuclear bomb; one mountaineer, commenting on Facebook, said that people stuck higher up on the mountain were "getting desperate". On 27 April, 60 people were rescued from Camp I and 170 were rescued from Camp II. Seventeen bodies were found on 25 April, and one was found on 27 April. On 26 April, one of the 61 badly injured died at KMC hospital.

== Deaths ==
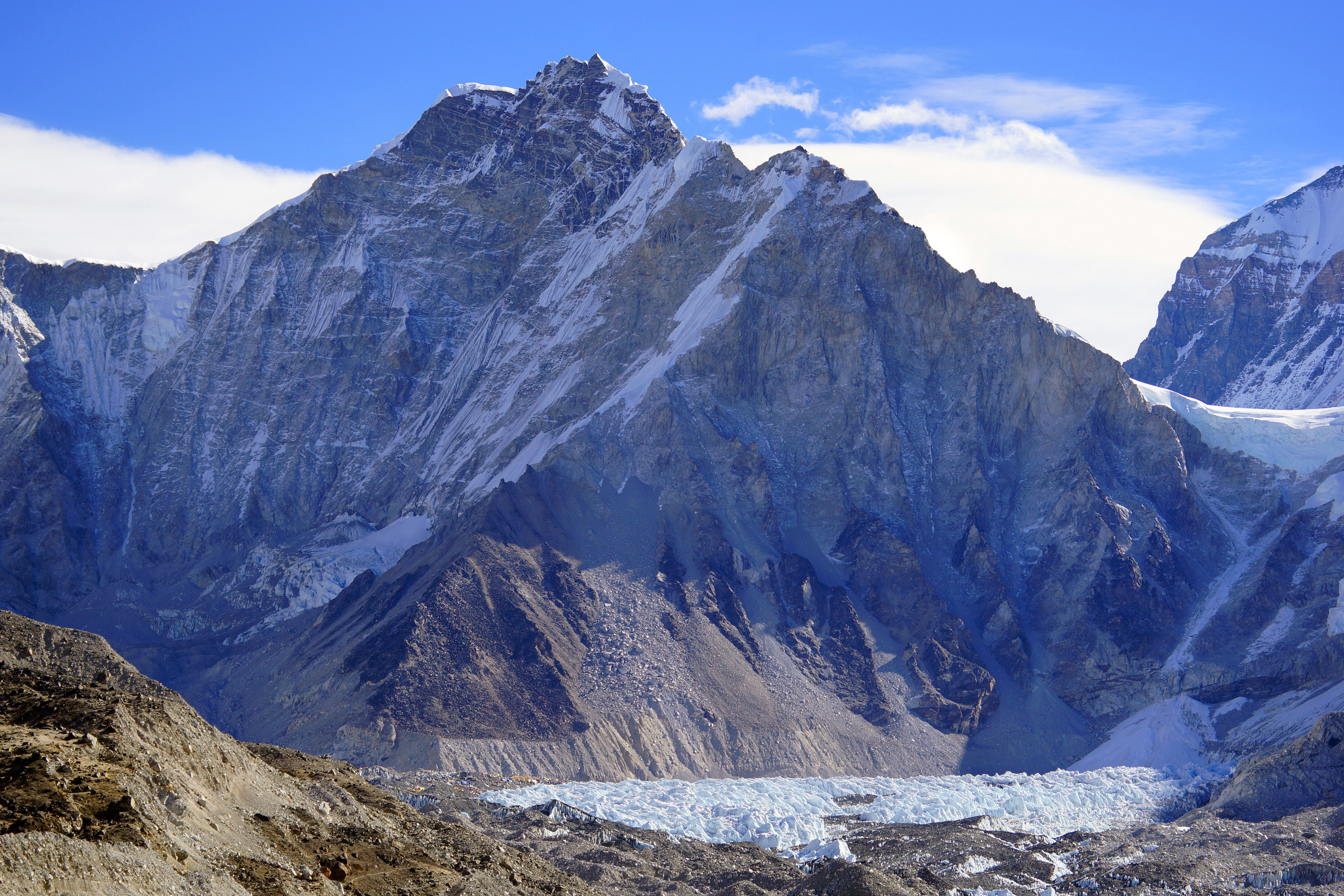
Khumbtse overlooks base camp

A Nepal Mountaineering Association report on 28 April listed 19 deaths, of which 10 were identified as Nepalese Sherpas and five were foreign climbers. Four were not identified by name. The five climbers were listed as two Americans, one Chinese, one Australian and one Japanese. On 27 April, National Geographic reported 24 deaths.

Google executive Dan Fredinburg, who was climbing Everest with three company employees while mapping the area for a future Google Earth-type project, and three other Americans, were confirmed dead.

== Effect on 2015 climbing season ==
Although the ladders at the Khumbu Icefall were damaged by the avalanches, a handful of mountaineers, undeterred by the disaster, immediately sought permission to continue with their attempt on the mountain and the Nepalese government gave them permission to do so four days after the earthquake on 29 April 2015. "The ladders will be repaired in the next two to three days and climbing will continue, there is no reason for anyone to quit their expedition," said Tulsi Gautam, chief of the Nepal Department of Tourism. "There is no scientific reason to expect another quake... and we feel the ground is stable enough for climbing despite aftershocks."

The closure of routes over the icefall for the remainder of the season was later announced, the second consecutive year that the mountain had been closed due to avalanches. After the second earthquake on 12 May 2015, Dambar Parajuli, president of the Expedition Operators' Association of Nepal, said there were no climbers or Nepali sherpa guides remaining at Everest Base Camp. As a result, no one climbed Mount Everest in the spring of 2015, the first time in 41 years that this had happened.

In August one climbing permit was issued, to Japanese mountaineer Nobukazu Kuriki. He turned around 700 m below the summit in October (in the autumn post-monsoon season). He had tried four times previously, losing all his fingers to frostbite. He died three years later on his eighth summit attempt.

== List of fatalities ==
Name	Nationality	Location of death	Cause of death	Date of death
Dan Fredinburg	United States	Base Camp	Avalanche	25 April 2015
Marisa Eve Girawong	United States	Base Camp	Avalanche	25 April 2015
Tom Taplin	United States	Base Camp	Avalanche	25 April 2015
Pemba Sherpa	Nepal	Base Camp	Avalanche	25 April 2015
Dawa Tsering Sherpa	Nepal	Base Camp	Avalanche	25 April 2015
Maila (Milan) Rai	Nepal	Base Camp	Avalanche	25 April 2015
Chhimi Dawa Sherpa	Nepal	Base Camp	Avalanche	25 April 2015
Pema Yishi (Hissi) Sherpa	Nepal	Base Camp	Avalanche	25 April 2015
Pasang Temba Sherpa	Nepal	Base Camp	Avalanche	25 April 2015
Krishna Kumar Rai	Nepal	Base Camp	Avalanche	25 April 2015
Tenzing (Tengien) Bhote	Nepal	Base Camp	Avalanche	25 April 2015
Renu Fotedar	Australia; India	Base Camp	Avalanche	25 April 2015
Lhakpa Chhiring Sherpa	Nepal	Base Camp	Avalanche	25 April 2015
Vinh Truong	United States; Vietnam	Base Camp	Avalanche	25 April 2015
Shiva Kumar Shrestha	Nepal	Base Camp	Avalanche	25 April 2015
Jangbu Sherpa	Nepal	Kathmandu	Succumbed to injuries that occurred during the avalanche on 25 April	1 May 2015

== See also ==
- List of deaths on eight-thousanders
- List of Mount Everest death statistics
- List of people who died climbing Mount Everest
- List of mountaineering disasters by death toll
- Mount Everest in 2017
