= David Sharp (mountaineer) =

British mountain climber (1972–2006)

- Born: 15 February 1972; Harpenden, England
- Died: 15 May 2006 (aged 34); Mount Everest, Tibet
- Cause of death: Hypothermia or cerebral oedema
- Education: Prior Pursglove College; University of Nottingham
- Occupations: Mountaineer; Mathematics teacher
- Height: 5 ft 11 in (180 cm)

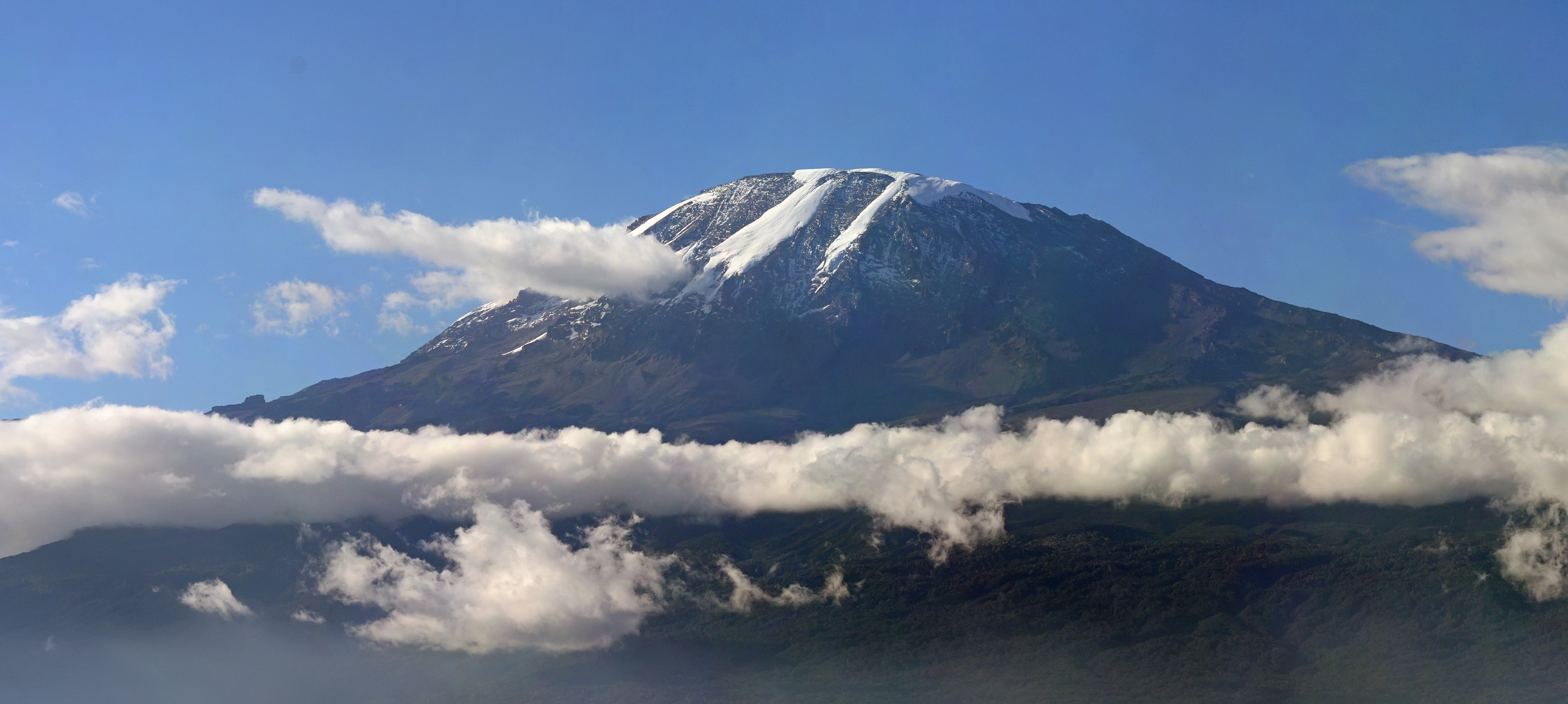
Mount Kilimanjaro, Africa's highest, summited by Sharp

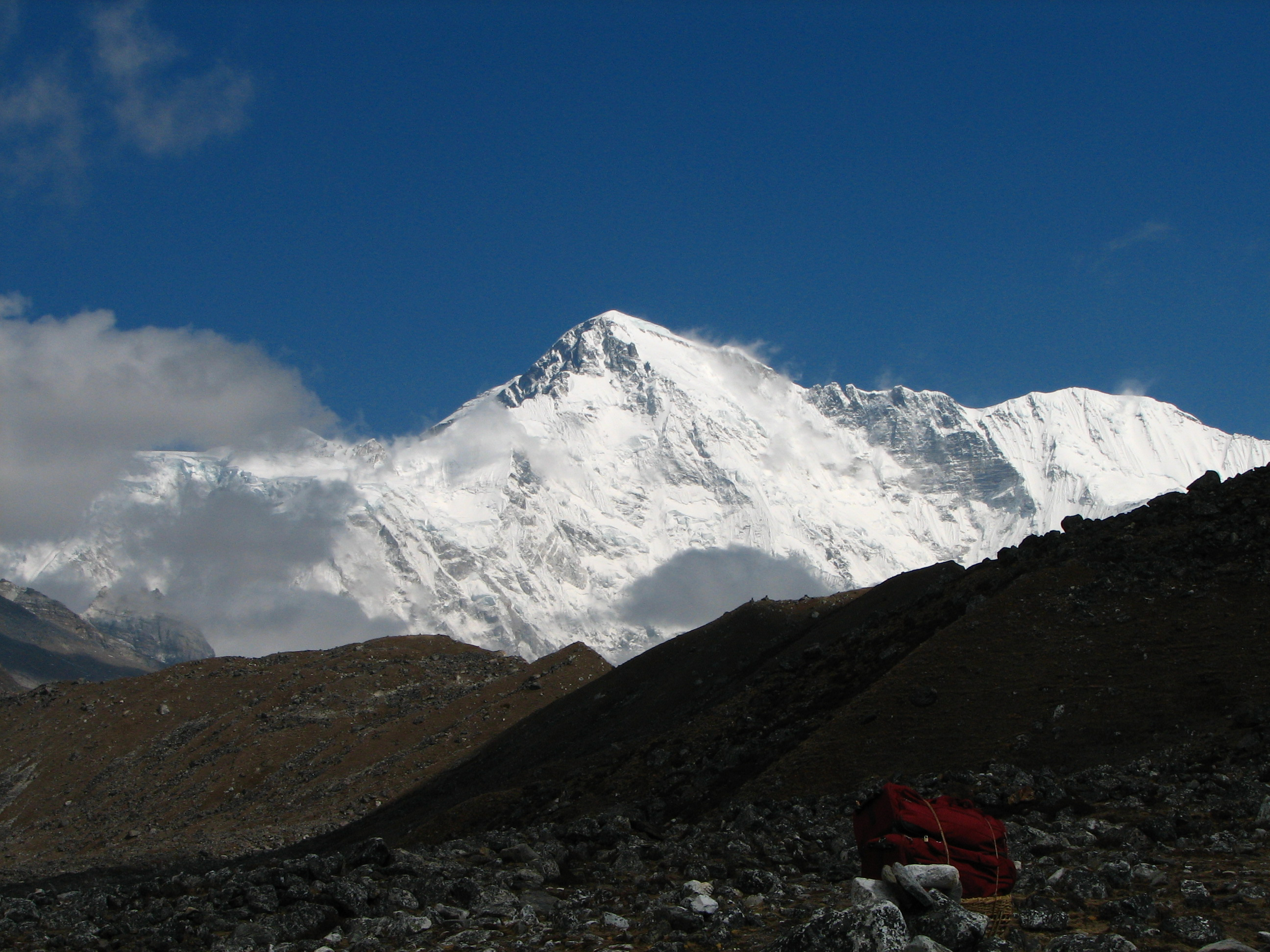
Cho Oyu (8,201 m (26,906 ft) high), where Sharp took a 2002 expedition

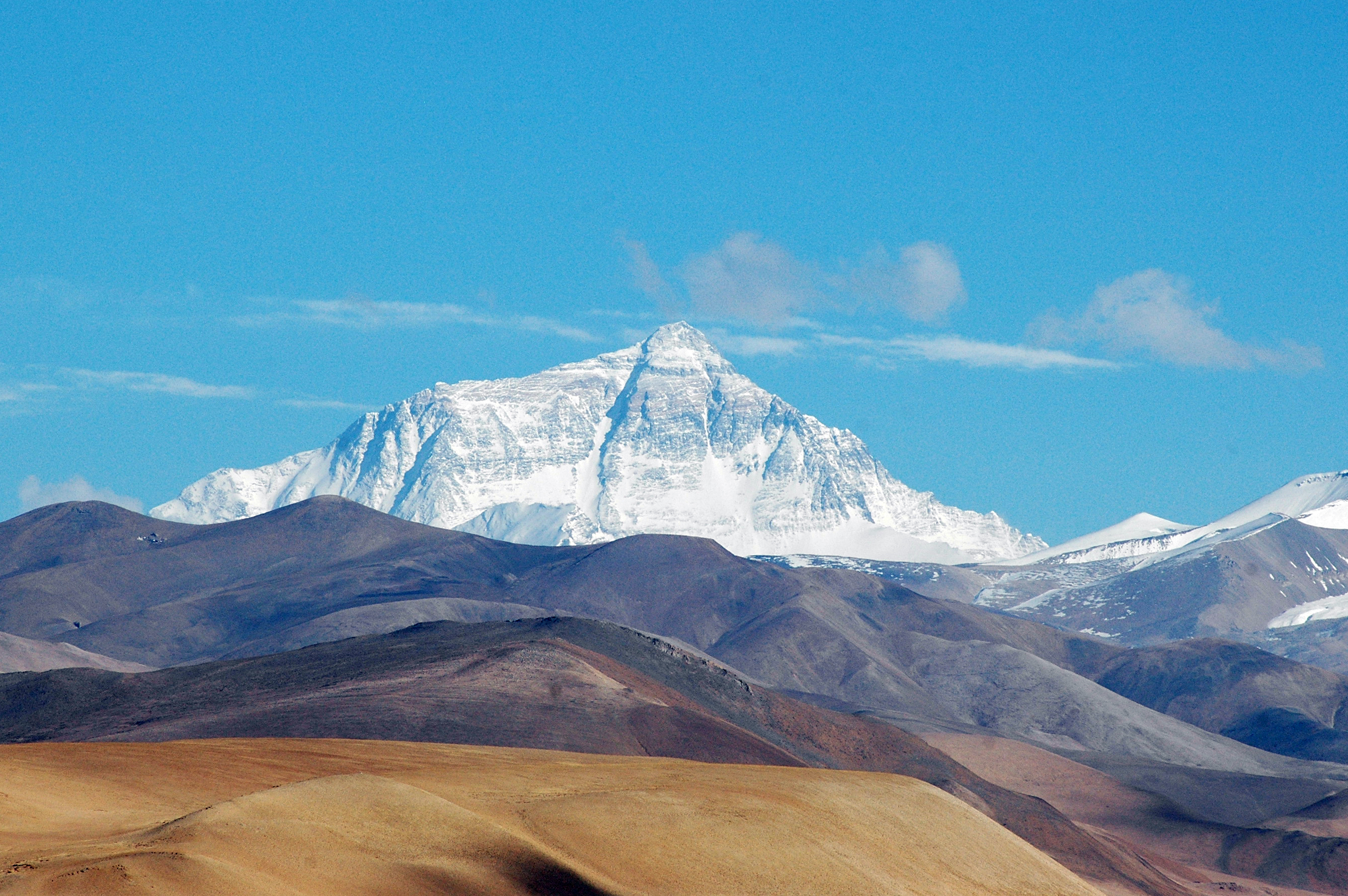
Mount Everest's North Face. Sharp took three expeditions to this mountain, with the third resulting in his death and triggering an international controversy.

David Sharp (15 February 1972 – 15 May 2006) was an English mountaineer who died near the summit of Mount Everest. His death caused controversy and debate because he was passed by several other climbers heading to and returning from the summit as he was dying, although several tried to help him.

Sharp had previously summited Cho Oyu and was noted as a talented rock climber who seemed to acclimatise well. He appeared briefly in season one of the television show Everest: Beyond the Limit, which was filmed the same season as his ill-fated expedition to Everest.

Sharp had a degree from the University of Nottingham and pursued climbing as a hobby. He had worked for an engineering firm and took time off to go on adventures and climbing expeditions, but had been planning to start work as a school teacher in autumn 2006.

== Early life ==
David Sharp was born in Harpenden, near London, and later attended Prior Pursglove College and the University of Nottingham. He graduated with a Mechanical Engineering degree in 1993. He worked for a global security company called Qinetiq. In 2005, he quit this job and took a teacher training course and was planning to start work as a teacher in the autumn of 2006. Sharp did not believe in using a guide for mountains he was familiar with, local climbing assistance, or artificial enhancements, such as high-altitude drugs or supplementary oxygen, to reach the top of a mountain.

== Expeditions and summits ==
=== Mountaineering summary ===
While growing up in England, Sharp climbed Roseberry Topping. At university, he was a member of the Mountaineering Club.

Sharp took a six-month sabbatical from his job to go on a backpacking trip through South America and Asia.

=== 2001 Gasherbrum II expedition ===
In 2001, Sharp went on an expedition to Gasherbrum II, an 8,035 m (26,362 ft) mountain located in the Karakoram, on the border between Gilgit–Baltistan province, Pakistan-administered Kashmir, and Xinjiang, China. The expedition, led by Henry Todd, did not summit due to bad weather.

=== 2002 Cho Oyu expedition ===
In 2002, Sharp went on an expedition to Cho Oyu, an 8,201 m (26,906 ft) peak in the Himalayas, with a group led by Richard Dougan and Jamie McGuinness of the Himalayan Project. They made it to the summit, but one member died from falling into a crevasse; this opened up a slot on the group's trip to Everest the following year. Dougan regarded Sharp as a strong climber but noted that he was tall and skinny, possessing a light frame with little body fat; in cold-weather mountaineering, body fat can be critical to survival.

=== 2003 Mount Everest expedition ===
Sharp's first Mount Everest expedition was in 2003 with a group led by British climber Richard Dougan. The party also included Terence Bannon, Martin Duggan, Stephen Synnott, and Jamie McGuinness. Only Bannon and McGuinness reached the summit, but the group incurred no fatalities. Dougan noted that Sharp had acclimatised well and was their strongest team member. In addition, Sharp was noted for being a pleasant person at camp and having a talent for rock climbing. However, when Sharp started to get frostbite on the group's ascent, most agreed to turn back with him from the summit.

Dougan and Sharp helped a struggling Spanish climber heading up at that time, giving him some extra oxygen. Sharp lost some of his toes to frostbite on this climb.

=== 2004 Mount Everest expedition ===
In 2004, Sharp joined a Franco-Austrian expedition to the north side of Mount Everest, climbed to 8,500 m (28,000 ft), but did not reach the summit. Sharp could not keep up with the others and stopped before the First Step. The expedition's leader was Hugues d’Aubarede, a French climber who was later killed in the 2008 K2 disaster (his third attempt to climb that mountain), but who became, on this 2004 expedition, the 56th French person to summit Everest. D'Aubarede's group reached the summit on the morning of 17 May and included Austrians Marcus Noichl, Paul Koller, and Fredrichs "Fritz" Klausner as well as Nepalis Chhang Dawa Sherpa, Lhakpa Gyalzen Sherpa, and Zimba Zangbu Sherpa (also known as Ang Babu).

D'Aubarede and Sharp disagreed on using supplementary oxygen while climbing. D'Aubarede said it was wrong to climb alone and attempt summiting without supplementary oxygen. In emails to other climbers, Sharp stated he did not believe in using extra oxygen. He joined four climbers on this expedition, so Sharp relented on that point of disagreement.

=== 2006 Mount Everest expedition ===
Sharp returned to Everest two years later to reach the summit on a solo climb arranged through Asian Trekking. Sharp was climbing alone and intended to reach the summit without using supplementary oxygen as he did not consider it a challenge to climb Everest with supplementary oxygen.

Sharp was climbing with a "basic services" package from Asian Trekking that did not offer support after a certain altitude reached on the mountain, or a Sherpa to climb with as a partner. This option had been available to Sharp for an additional fee. He was grouped with 13 other independent climbers – including Vitor Negrete, Thomas Weber, and Igor Plyushkin who also died attempting to summit that year – on the International Everest Expedition. This package provided a permit, a trip into Tibet, oxygen equipment, transportation, food, and tents up to the Mount Everest "Advance Base Camp" (ABC) at an elevation of about 6,340 m (20,800 ft). The group Sharp was in had no leader, although it is considered good climbing etiquette that members of the group make some effort to keep track of one another.

Before Sharp booked his trip with Asian Trekking, his friend McGuinness, an experienced climber and guide, invited him to join his organised expedition at a discount. Sharp acknowledged this as a good deal but declined so he could act independently and climb at his own pace. Sharp opted to climb alone without a Sherpa and decided not to bring supplementary oxygen or a radio to call for help if he encountered problems.

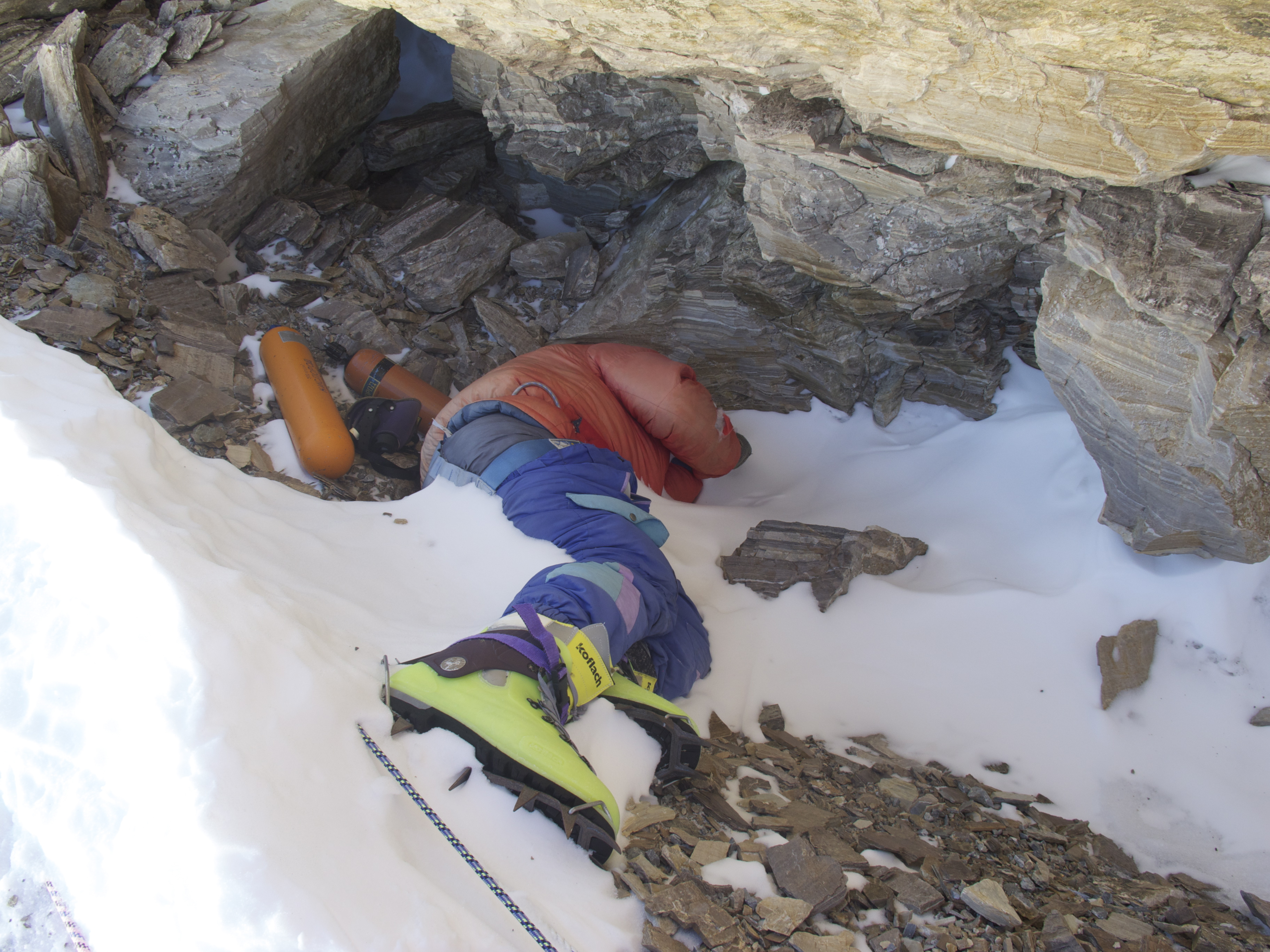
Photo of Green Boots, a formerly unidentified corpse whose body became a landmark on the main Northeast ridge route of Mount Everest. DNA testing showed him to be Dorje Morup.

Sharp was transported by vehicle to the Base Camp, and his equipment was transported by yak train to the Advance Base Camp as part of the Asian Trekking "basic services" package. Sharp remained there for five days to acclimatise to the altitude. He made several trips up and down the mountain to set up and stock his upper camps and further acclimatise himself. Sharp likely set out from a camp high on the mountain below the Northeast Ridge to make a summit attempt during the late evening of 13 May. He needed to climb what is referred to as the "Exit Cracks", traverse the Northeast Ridge, including the Three Steps, reach the summit, then climb down to return to his high camp.

Sharp either managed to reach the summit or turned back near the summit to descend very late on 14 May. Sharp was forced to bivouac during his nighttime descent at about 8,500 m (28,000 ft) on the mountain under a rocky overhang known as Green Boots' Cave, situated near the so-called First Step without any remaining supplementary oxygen due to bad weather conditions, possible equipment problems, and likely a degree of altitude sickness due to a lack of oxygen.

Sharp's predicament was not immediately known as he was not climbing with an expedition that would monitor climbers' locations, he had not told anyone beforehand of his summit attempt (although other climbers spotted him on his ascent), he did not have a radio or satellite phone to notify others, and two other more inexperienced climbers from his group went missing around the same time. One of the two missing climbers was Malaysian Ravi Chandran (also known as Ravichandran Tharumalingam), who was eventually found but required medical attention after getting frostbite.

Members of the group of climbers Sharp was with, including George Dijmarescu, realised Sharp was missing when he did not return later in the evening on May 15 and nobody reported seeing him. There was no immediate concern as Sharp was an experienced climber who had previously turned back when he had experienced problems, and it was surmised that Sharp had sought shelter at one of the higher camps or bivouacked somewhere higher up on Everest. High-altitude bivouacs are very risky but are sometimes recommended in certain extreme situations.

Sharp died under the rocky overhang, sitting with arms clasped around his legs, next to Green Boots.

== Accounts of the fatal climb ==
=== Himex expedition – first team ===
Himex had organised several teams to climb Everest during the 2006 climbing season expedition. The first team was guided by mountain climber and guide Bill Crouse. At around 01:00 on 14 May, during their ascent near the North route known as the "Exit Cracks", Crouse's expedition team passed by Sharp. When Crouse's team descended around 11:00, Sharp was seen again higher up on the mountain at the base of the Third Step. After Crouse's expedition had descended to the Second Step, more than one hour later, Sharp was seen above the Third Step climbing very slowly, only having moved about 90 m (295 ft).

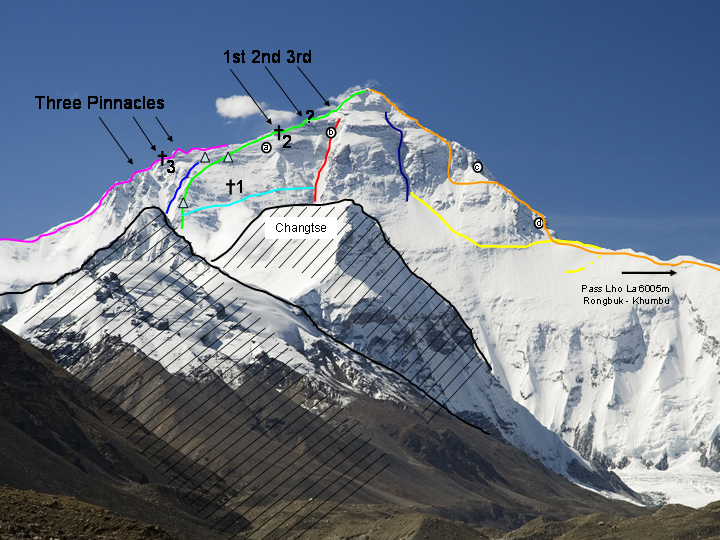
The location of the Three Steps on the northeast ridge route is marked on this diagram, and the location of the rock overhang known as Green Boots' Cave where Sharp took shelter is marked with a †_{2}.

=== Turkish team ===
A team of Turkish climbers also reported encountering Sharp. They left their high camp in the evening on 14 May and were traveling in three separate groups.

In the late evening to early morning, the Turkish team members encountered Sharp while ascending. The first group encountered Sharp around midnight, noticed he was alive, and thought he was a climber taking a short break. Sharp supposedly waved them on. Others who later noticed Sharp thought he was already dead. It is thought that Sharp might have fallen asleep between these two encounters. Sharp's wanting to sleep was noted by other climbers in later encounters, and a quote attributed to him telling people that he wanted to sleep was reported by some news stories.

Some of the Turkish team summited early in the morning on 15 May, while others turned back near the summit due to medical difficulties. The Turkish team members who turned back reencountered Sharp at about 07:00, one of them being the Turkish team leader, Serhan Poçan, who had thought Sharp was a climber who had recently died in his previous passing. In the daylight, Poçan realised that Sharp was alive and in critical condition.

Sharp had no oxygen left with severe frostbite and some frozen limbs. Two Turkish climbers stayed, gave him something to drink, and tried to help him move. They were forced to leave due to low oxygen but intended to return with more. Their initial effort to help was complicated by trying to safely get Burçak Özoğlu Poçan, the climber in their group having medical issues, down. Serhan Poçan placed radio calls to the part of his team descending the summit about Sharp and continued descending with Burçak. Around 08:30, two other members of the Turkish team cleaned out Sharp's iced mask to provide oxygen, but had to descend when they themselves began to run out. Later, the remaining Turks and some Himex expedition members attempted to further help Sharp.

=== Himex expedition – Second team ===
The second team of Himex climbers included Maxime Chaya, New Zealand double-amputee Mark Inglis, Wayne Alexander (who designed Inglis' prosthetic climbing legs), Discovery cameraman Mark Whetu, experienced climbing guide Mark Woodward, and their Sherpa support team, including Phurba Tashi. The team left their high camp around 8,200 m (26,903 ft) near midnight on 14 May. Chaya and the Sherpa porter/guide were ahead by about half an hour.

At about 01:00, Woodward and his group (including Inglis, Alexander, Whetu, and some Sherpa porters) encountered an unconscious Sharp. He was afflicted with severe frostbite but noticeably breathing. Woodward noted Sharp had thin gloves and no oxygen and they yelled at Sharp to get up, get moving, and follow the headlamps back to the high camps. Woodward shined his headlamp in Sharp's eyes, but Sharp was unresponsive.

Woodward, believing Sharp was in a hypothermic coma, commented, "Oh, this poor guy, he's stuffed," and believed Sharp could not be rescued. Woodward attempted to radio their Advanced Base Camp about Sharp but received no reply. Alexander commented, "God bless... Rest in peace", before the group moved on. Woodward said it was not an easy decision but his chief responsibility was the safety of his team members. Stopping in the extreme cold at that time would have compromised his team's survival.

Chaya reached the summit at around 06:00. During his descent, Chaya and the Sherpa porter/guide he was with, Dorjee, encountered Sharp a little after 09:00 and tried to help him. Chaya also notified the Himex expedition manager Russell Brice over the group's radio. He had not seen Sharp in the dark during the ascent. Chaya observed that Sharp was unconscious, shivering severely, and was wearing a thin pair of wool gloves with no hat, glasses, or goggles. Sharp was severely frostbitten, had frozen hands and legs, and was found with only one empty oxygen bottle.

At one point, Sharp stopped shivering, leading Chaya to believe he had died; sometime later, he started shivering again. They attempted to give him oxygen, but there was no response. After about an hour, Brice advised Chaya to return as there was nothing to be done and he was running out of oxygen. Chaya told The Washington Post: "It almost looks like he [David Sharp] had a death wish".

Soon after Chaya descended, some of the others from the second Himex group and a Turkish group reencountered Sharp during their descent and attempted to help him. Phurba Tashi, the lead Sherpa guide for Himex, and a Turkish Sherpa guide gave Sharp oxygen from a spare bottle they found, patted him in attempt to aid circulation and tried to give him something to drink. At one point, Sharp mumbled a few sentences. The group attempted to get Sharp to his feet, but he could not stand, even with assistance. Moving Sharp into sunlight required the two strongest Sherpa climbers and took 20 minutes. Deciding Sharp could not be rescued, the group descended.

=== Mark Inglis controversy ===
Following Sharp's death, Mark Inglis was initially severely criticised by the media and others, including Sir Edmund Hillary, for not helping Sharp. Inglis stated that Sharp had been passed by 30 to 40 other climbers heading for the summit who did not attempt a rescue, but he was criticised for not helping Sharp simply because he was more well-known. Inglis said he believed Sharp was ill-prepared, lacking proper gloves, enough supplementary oxygen, and was already doomed by the time of his ascent. He also initially stated, "I... radioed, and [expedition manager Russell Brice] said, 'Mate, you can't do anything. He's been there X number of hours without oxygen. He's effectively dead.' Trouble is, at 8500 meters it's extremely difficult to keep yourself alive, let alone keep anyone else alive".

Statements by Inglis suggest that he believed Sharp was beyond help by the time the Inglis party passed him during their ascent and the reported radio calls to their base camp. However, Brice, who was initially criticised for reportedly advising Inglis during his ascent to move on without assessing the situation or the possibility of rescuing Sharp, denied that he received any radio call about Sharp until he was notified some eight hours later by climber Maxime Chaya. At this time, Sharp was unconscious and shivering violently, had severe frostbite, and no gloves or oxygen. Brice kept detailed logs of radio calls with his expedition members, recorded all radio traffic, and the Discovery Channel was filming Brice during this time, all of which confirmed that Brice was first notified of Sharp being in trouble when Chaya contacted Brice at about 09:00.

In the documentary Dying for Everest, Mark Inglis stated: "From my memory, I used the radio. I got a reply to move on and there is nothing that I can do to help. Now I'm not sure whether it was from Russell [Brice] or from someone else, or whether you know... it's just hypoxia and it's ... it's in your mind." It is believed that if Inglis did have a radio conversation where he was told that "he's been there X number of hours without oxygen", that it must have been on Inglis' descent, as during his ascent there was no way for Brice or other climbers to have known how long Sharp had been there. In July 2006, Inglis retracted his claim, blaming the extreme conditions at altitude for the uncertainty in his memory.

=== Jamie McGuinness ===
New Zealand mountaineer Jamie McGuinness reported a Sherpa who reached Sharp on the descent, "...Dawa from Arun Treks also gave oxygen to David and tried to help him move, repeatedly, for perhaps an hour. But he could not get David to stand alone or even stand resting on his shoulders. Dawa had to leave him too. Even with two Sherpas, it was not going to be possible to get David down the tricky sections below".

McGuinness was part of an expedition that successfully climbed Cho Oyu with Sharp in 2002. He also was on the 2003 expedition to Mount Everest with Sharp and other climbers, and in 2006 offered Sharp the opportunity to climb Everest with his organised expedition for little more than what he paid Asian Trekking. In the documentary Dying For Everest, McGuiness noted that Sharp did not expect to be rescued – "absolutely not, he was clear to me that he understood the risks and he did not want to endanger anyone else".

=== Discovery Channel TV series ===
Sharp was briefly caught on a camera in the morning on 15 May by those filming the first season of the television show Everest: Beyond the Limit. The footage was from the helmet camera of a Himex Sherpa during their descent who was attempting to help Sharp along with a Turkish Sherpa and one of the other groups of Himex climbers, including Mark Inglis.

=== Reactions ===
==== Sir Edmund Hillary ====
Sir Edmund Hillary - one of the first two climbers confirmed to have reached the summit of Everest - was highly critical of the reported decision at the time to not try to rescue Sharp, saying that leaving other climbers to die is unacceptable, and the desire to get to the summit has become all-important. "I think the whole attitude towards climbing Mount Everest has become rather horrifying. The people just want to get to the top. It was wrong if there was a man suffering altitude problems and was huddled under a rock, just to lift your hat, say good morning and pass on by". He told the New Zealand Herald that he was horrified by the callous attitude of today's climbers. "They don't give a damn for anybody else who may be in distress and it doesn't impress me at all that they leave someone lying under a rock to die", and, "I think that their priority was to get to the top and the welfare of one of the ... of a member of another expedition was very secondary." Hillary also called Mark Inglis "crazy".

==== Sharp's mother ====
Linda Sharp, David's mother, has said she does not blame other climbers. She told The Sunday Times, "Your responsibility is to save yourself – not to try to save anybody else."

==== David Watson ====
Mountaineer David Watson, who was on the North side of Everest that season, commented to The Washington Post: "It's too bad that none of the people who cared about David knew he was in trouble... the outcome would have been a lot different." Watson thought it was possible to save Sharp, and said Sharp had worked with other climbers in 2004 to save a Mexican climber who had gotten into trouble. Watson was alerted the morning of 16 May by Phurba Tashi. Watson went to Sharp's tent and showed Sharp's passport to Tashi, who confirmed his identity. Around this time, a Korean team gave a radio report that the climber in red boots [Sharp] was dead. He had his rucksack with him, but his camera was missing, so it is not known if he summited.

=== Fate of the body ===
Sharp's body remains on the mountain, but was removed from sight in 2007.

== See also ==
- 1996 Mount Everest disaster
- Beck Weathers
- Lincoln Hall (climber)
- List of Mount Everest expeditions
- List of people who died climbing Mount Everest
- List of solved missing person cases (2000s)
