= Serhan =

Serhan is a masculine given name of Kurdish origin. It is derived from the Kurdish words ser ‘head, top’ and han, which is a variant of Northern Kurdish xanî 'house, household.’ The name ultimately originates from serê xaniyê ‘head of the house; head of the household.’ An alternative interpretation takes han as the Turko-Mongolic honorific khan 'regnant.' Notable people with the name include:

== Given name ==
- Serhan Poçan (born 1970), Turkish mountaineer
- Serhan Yavaş (born 1972), Turkish actor and model
- Serhan Zengin (born 1990), German-Turkish footballer
