= Poçan =

Poçan is a Turkish surname. Notable people with the surname include:

- Burçak Özoğlu Poçan (born 1970), Turkish mountain climber
- Mark Pocan (born 1964), American politician
- Serhan Poçan (born 1970), Turkish mountaineer
