= Adrian Ballinger =

American climber (born 1976)

Personal information
- Nationality: American; British
- Born: February 25, 1976 (age 50) United Kingdom
- Spouse: Emily Harrington

Climbing career
- Major ascents: Everest without supplemental oxygen, K2 without supplemental oxygen, Lhotse, Cho Oyu, First person to ski Makalu

Adrian Ballinger (born February 25, 1976) is a British-American certified IFMGA/AMGA mountain guide. Ballinger is the founder of Alpenglow Expeditions. He has led over 150 international climbing expeditions on six continents, and made 18 successful summits of 8,000 meter peaks.

He is known for the use of pre-acclimatization in altitude tents for commercial expeditions, which can cut the amount of time typically spent on an expedition in half. Ballinger is the only American to have made three successful ski descents of 8,000 m peaks, including the first ski descent of Manaslu from its summit. He is also the fourth American to have summited both Mount Everest and K2 without using supplemental oxygen.

== Career ==
Ballinger worked as a guide for Himalayan Experience until 2012, and was featured with Himex founder, Russell Brice, on the Discovery Channel's Everest: Beyond the Limit series.

Ballinger founded Alpenglow Expeditions in 2004. Based in Olympic Valley California, the company leads over 30 international expeditions on 6 continents yearly.

Since 2008, he has achieved 18 successful 8,000m summits, reaching the summit of Everest 9 times, Manaslu 4 times, Cho Oyu 3 times, and both K2 and Lhotse once. He has also led three expeditions to Makalu, the world's fifth tallest peak. In 2011 he became the first person to summit three 8,000m peaks in just three weeks, reaching the summit of Everest twice and Lhotse once. Ballinger has led successful expeditions to more than 40 Himalayan summits over 6000 meters, including twelve ascents of Ama Dablam.

In 2019, Ballinger served as the lead guide and expedition outfitter for a Discovery Channel sponsored expedition attempting to uncover the mystery of whether George Mallory and Andrew Irvine made the first summit of Mount Everest in 1924. The expedition was filmed and released as a Discovery.com documentary released in October 2020 called Everest's Greatest Mystery. That same year, in an expedition sponsored by Eddie Bauer, Ballinger and fellow Alpenglow Expeditions guide Carla Perez made an attempt to climb K2 without the use of supplemental oxygen. On July 24, they reached the summit without the use of bottled oxygen. They were supported by Esteban “Topo” Mena, Palden Namgye Sherpa, and Pemba Geija Sherpa. The climb was made into a film produced by Eddie Bauer titled Breathtaking: K2 - The World's Most Dangerous Mountain.

In 2022, Ballinger returned to Makalu and made the first ski descent. Skiing from the Summit to crampon point before descending back to ABC the same day. Adrian started his ski descent from 15m below the summit due to crowding on the summit. He rappelled a 60m section in the French Couloir without his skis, and descended the rest of the mountain rappelling and using the fixed lines as hand lines sparingly.

He appeared in and acted as climbing consultant for the 2025 horror film The Sound.

== Personal life ==
Ballinger is married to professional climber and The North Face Athlete Emily Harrington.

== 8,000m summits ==
Everest, (8,848m, 29,032’):

- May 21, 2009
- May 5, 2010
- May 22, 2010
- May 5, 2011
- May 20, 2011
- May 18, 2013
- May 27, 2017 (without supplemental oxygen)
- May 20, 2018
- May 29, 2024

K2, (8,611m, 28,251’):

- July 24, 2019 (without supplemental oxygen)

Lhotse, (8,516m, 27,940’):

- May 26, 2011

Makalu, (8,481m, 27,824'):

- May 8, 2022

Cho Oyu, (8,188m, 26,906’):

- Sept 25, 2013 (Ski Descent)
- Oct 1st, 2016 (Ski Descent)
- May 6, 2018

Manaslu, (8,163m, 26,759’):

- Oct 3rd, 2008
- Sept 28, 2009
- Oct 1st, 2010
- Oct 5th, 2011 (Ski Descent)

== See also ==
- List of Mount Everest summiters by number of times to the summit
- List of Mount Everest guides
