= Mark Inglis =

New Zealand mountaineer, biochemist and entrepreneur

Mark Inglis ONZM
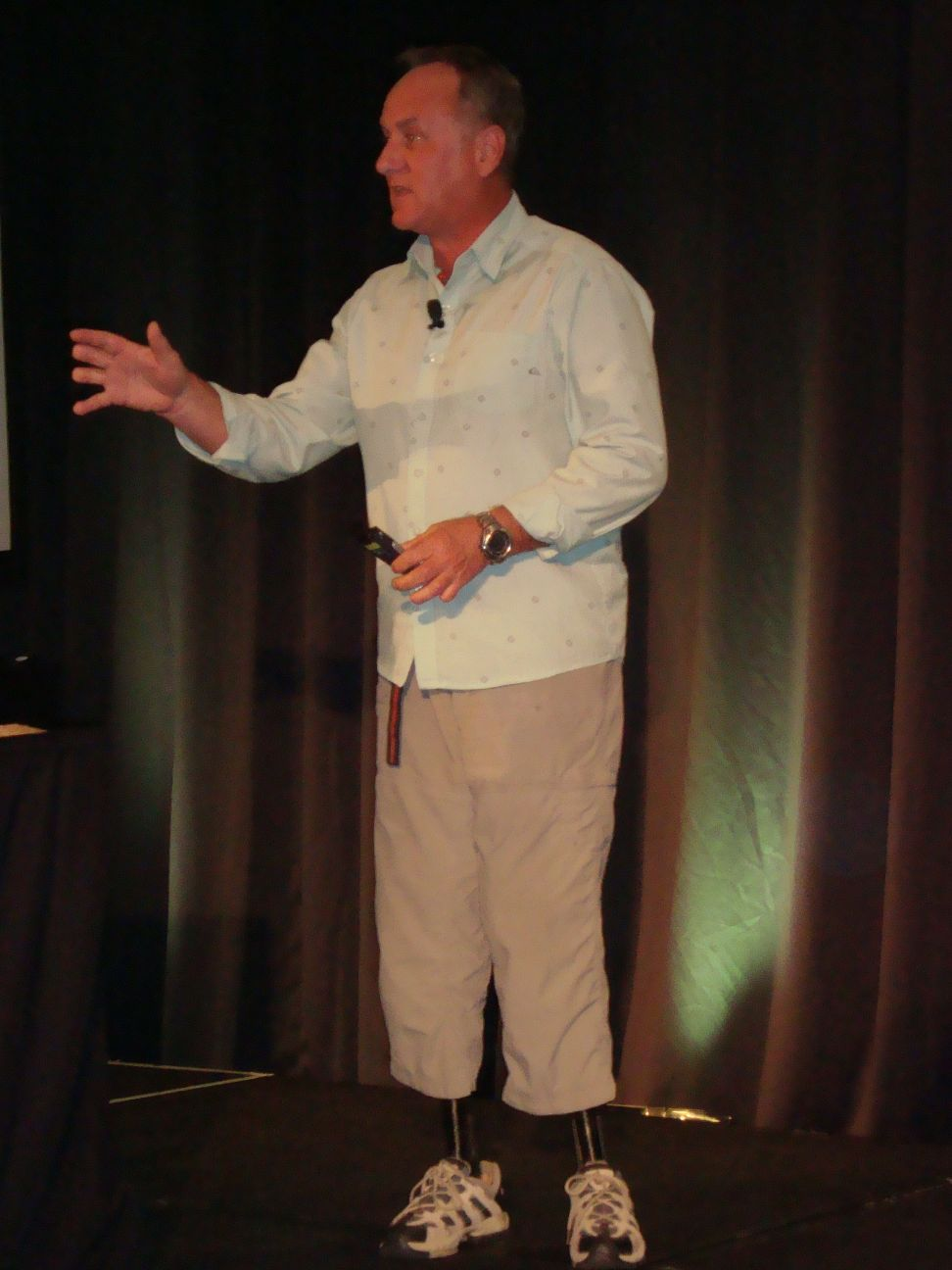
- Inglis in 2009

Personal information
- Born: Mark Joseph Inglis; 27 September 1959 (age 66) Geraldine, New Zealand
- Occupations: Mountaineer; Motivational speaker
- Website: MarkInglisUnlimited.co.nz

Mark Joseph Inglis ONZM (born 27 September 1959) is a New Zealand mountaineer, researcher, winemaker and motivational speaker. He holds a degree in human biochemistry from Lincoln University, New Zealand, and has conducted research on leukaemia. He is also an accomplished cyclist and, as a double leg amputee, won a silver medal in the 1 km time trial event at the 2000 Summer Paralympics in Sydney. He is the first double amputee to reach the summit of Mount Everest, the highest mountain in the world above sea level.

In addition to being a goodwill ambassador for the Everest Rescue Trust, Inglis has created a New Zealand-based charitable trust Limbs4All. He has also created a range of sports drinks and energy gels named PeakFuel.

== Mountaineering ==
Born in Geraldine, Inglis began work as a professional mountaineer in 1979 as a search and rescue mountaineer for Aoraki / Mount Cook National Park. In 1982 Inglis and climbing partner Philip Doole were stuck in a snow cave on Aoraki / Mount Cook for 13 days due to an intense blizzard. The rescue of the two climbers was a major media event in New Zealand. Both men's legs became badly frostbitten while awaiting rescue. Following Inglis's rescue, both his legs were amputated 14 cm below the knee. He returned to Mt. Cook in 2002 and reached the summit successfully on 7 January of that year, after a previous attempt was thwarted by problems with his legs. The summit assault in January 2002 was documented by the film No Mean Feat: The Mark Inglis Story.

In the 2002 Queen's Birthday and Golden Jubilee Honours, Inglis was appointed an Officer of the New Zealand Order of Merit, for services to persons with disabilities. On 27 September 2004, he successfully climbed Cho Oyu with three others, becoming only the second double amputee to summit a mountain greater than 8,000 metres (26,000 ft) in height.

On 15 May 2006, after 40 days of climbing, Inglis became the first ever double amputee to reach the summit of Mount Everest, the highest mountain in the world. While acclimatizing at 6,400 metres (21,000 ft), a fixed-line anchor failed, resulting in Inglis falling and breaking one of his carbon fiber prosthetic legs in half. It was temporarily repaired with duct tape, while a spare was brought up from base camp. Inglis's Everest expedition was filmed for the Discovery Channel series Everest: Beyond the Limit.

=== David Sharp controversy ===
While ascending Everest, Inglis and a party of 18 other climbers came upon distressed British climber David Sharp, but continued pushing towards the summit, effectively condemning Sharp to death. Sharp subsequently died. Inglis has been criticised for this decision by many people including Sir Edmund Hillary, who said he should have abandoned any attempt at the summit to help a fellow climber. Inglis dismissed the criticism by falsely claiming that the decision was actually made by expedition leader Russell Brice, who was at the base camp. He also stated that the "trouble is at 8,500 metres it's extremely difficult to keep yourself alive, let alone anyone else alive." Some other climbers have agreed with this assessment, claiming there is little that can be done for a seriously ill person that close to the summit. However, Phil Ainslie, a mountaineer and scientist at the University of Otago, has said that it might have been possible to revive Sharp with bottled oxygen and get him to safety.

In an e-mailed statement to the Associated Press on 10 June, the expedition leader Russell Brice contradicted comments by Inglis by saying that he only knew David Sharp was in distress when his team contacted him by radio during their descent.

Brice received many radio messages (many of which were heard by others) that night and a full log was kept. There is no record of any call from Mark Inglis. This was also supported by complete video of the time period which was recorded by a Discovery Channel crew. Inglis' group continued to the summit, passing David Sharp who they knew to be alive, without offering any assistance. Sharp was in a grave condition. On their descent, passing back through the cave several hours later, the group found Sharp near death. Inglis' fellow climber, Maxime Chaya (or Max) and Chaya's Sherpa mountaineering partner attempted to help David Sharp, but to no avail. Inglis did not render aid during the descent.

== Personal life ==
Inglis currently resides in Hanmer Springs, New Zealand, with his wife Anne and their three children. In 2007, he was honoured by TVNZ's This Is Your Life. In 2024, he appeared on New Zealand panel show 7 Days.

== Books authored ==
Inglis has authored four books:

- No Mean Feat (2002) documents his entrapment and rescue from Mt. Cook, his successful summit of the same mountain in 2002, and his efforts in the Paralympics
- To the Max: a Teen Reader's Version of No Mean Feat (2003)
- Off the Front Foot (2003) offers views on coping with positive and negative aspects of life.
- No Legs on Everest (2006) is a detailed account of his ascent of Everest including his climb of Cho Oyu.

== See also ==
- List of Mount Everest records
