= Phurba Tashi =

Nepalese Sherpa mountaineer

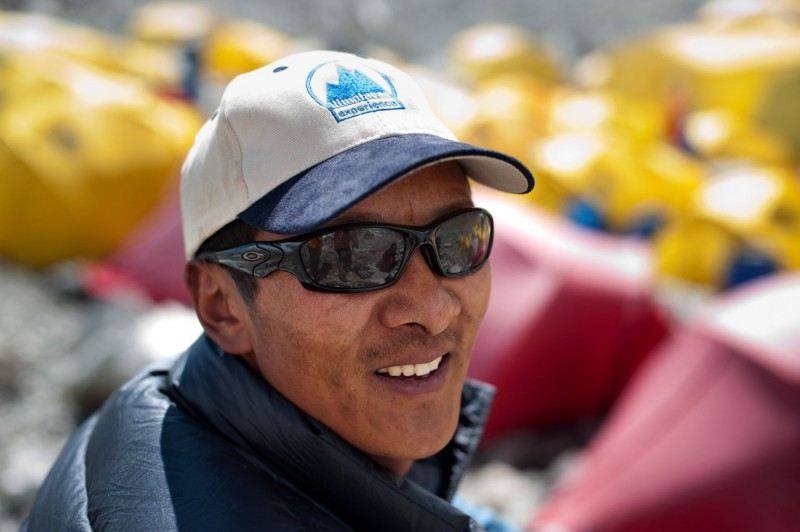
- Born: May 24, 1971 (age 55); Khumjung, Nepal
- Occupations: Mountain guide, guesthouse owner
- Known for: 21 ascents of Mount Everest

Phurba Tashi Sherpa Mendewa (Nepali: फूर्वा तासी शेर्पा, 1971) is a Nepalese Sherpa mountaineer known for his numerous ascents of major Himalayan peaks. These include 21 ascents of Mount Everest, six on Cho Oyu, eight on Manaslu, and one each on Shishapangma and Lhotse.

== Everest climbs ==
Phurba Tashi was born in Khumjung, Nepal, 10 kilometers from Everest's base camp. He grew up in a family of climbers, watching his father and uncles go on climbing expeditions with international mountaineers.

His first successful summit of an eight-thousander was Cho Oyu in 1998. The next year, at age 28, Tashi summited Mount Everest for the first time.

In 2000, he accompanied Marco Siffredi up Cho Oyu for the first snowboard descent of that mountain. The two became friends, with Tashi later visiting Siffredi in Chamonix before accompanying him for both his successful Everest ascents. After a nearly 13 hour climb on their second summit of Everest, on September 8, 2002, Phurba encouraged Siffredi to abandon his attempt to be the first to snowboard the Hornbein Couloir. Siffredi refused, and was eventually lost on the mountain.

=== Everest: Beyond the Limit ===
From 2006 to 2007, Tashi was featured in the Discovery Channel series Everest: Beyond the Limit. Appearing in 11 episodes, he appears in more episodes than anyone else in the series. In the first season of the Discovery Channel series (2006), he was shown carrying double-amputee Mark Inglis down a portion of the lower descent on his back.

In 2007, he reached the summit three times in that single season. That year, as a result of urging by expedition leader Russell Brice, Tashi agreed to accompany David Tait on his mission to complete the first double traverse of Everest, climbing the north route to the summit, descending on the south side, resting for three days, and then repeating the trip in reverse. Once at Base Camp on the south side of the mountain, however, Tait decided to bow out of the return traverse. Tait said that his decision was influenced by his belief that Phurba Tashi was a far superior climber and would have allowed him all the glory had they continued. Tait summited Everest for a third time in May 2009, again accompanied by Tashi (his 15th summit).

Phurba Tashi completed his 21st summit of Mount Everest in May 2013 while working for Kishan Rai Mountain Experience, matching the record then held by Apa Sherpa. The record was broken in 2018 by Kami Rita Sherpa.

== Everest summits ==
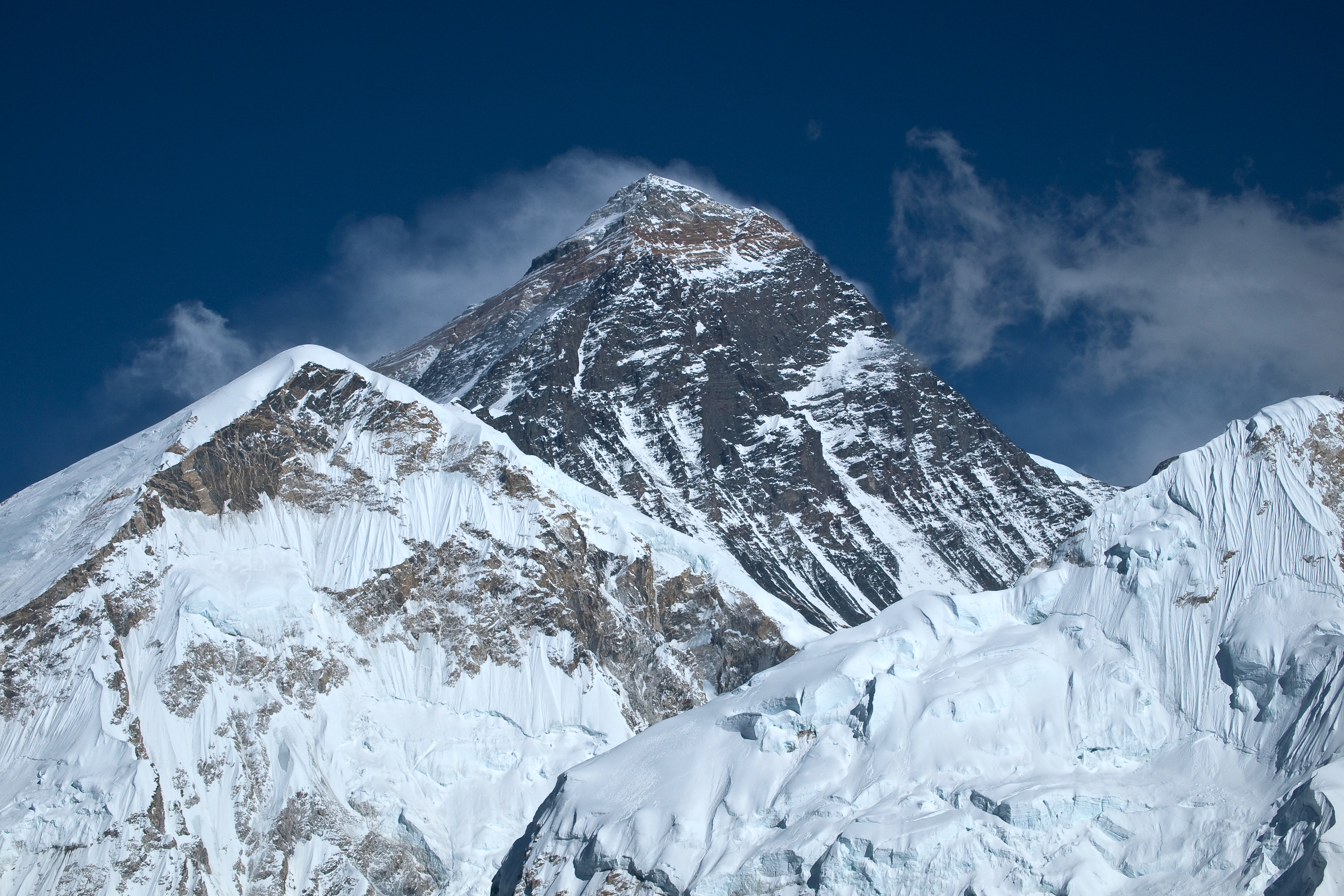
Mount Everest

1. May 24, 1999
2. May 27, 2001
3. May 17, 2002
4. May 25, 2002
5. September 8, 2002
6. May 22, 2003
7. May 31, 2003
8. May 23, 2004
9. June 4, 2005
10. April 30, 2006
11. April 30, 2007
12. May 15, 2007
13. June 14, 2007
14. May 5, 2009
15. May 21, 2009
16. May 5, 2010
17. May 22, 2010
18. May 5, 2011
19. May 20, 2011
20. May 10, 2013
21. May 24, 2013 (21st Everest summiting)

== After the record ==
The year after Tashi's record equalizing summit, he prepared to make his 22nd ascent of Mount Everest. A film crew led by director Jennifer Peedom and cinematographer Renan Ozturk, planned to chronicle the attempt. However, the 2014 Mount Everest ice avalanche caused the producers to change the focus to covering the aftermath of the tragic event. Nonetheless, Phurba Tashi was featured prominently in the documentary released in 2015 as Sherpa.

Phurba Tashi retired from climbing Everest after the 2014 season. The "Everest Yak" as he is known, continued to have a presence at Everest Base Camp, as the head Sherpa for Himex.

In 2015, Phurba Tashi's life was greatly impacted by the 2015 earthquake that seriously affected his village of Khumjung. "Everything I worked for was destroyed in a minute", he said after the loss of his eight-bedroom trekking lodge in Khumjung, Nepal and the extensive damage to his house.

Today, Tashi continues to work with Russell Brice and other expeditions managing operations for climbers on Everest. Tashi additionally operates the Tashi Friendship Lodge, a guesthouse and restaurant in Khumjung, Nepal.

== Other climbs ==
- 1998 - Cho Oyu, summit (8,188 m)
- 1999 - Cho Oyu, (7,400 m due to bad snow conditions)
- 2000 - Cho Oyu, summit (8,188 m)
- 2001 - Cho Oyu, summit (8,188 m)
- 2004 - Cho Oyu, summit (8,188 m)
- 2005 - Cho Oyu, summit (8,188 m)
- 2007 - Cho Oyu, (7527m due to dangerous weather)
- 2008, Ama Dablam, summit (6814 m)
- 2008 - Manaslu, summit (8,163 m)
- 2009 - Ama Dablam, summit (6814 m)
- 2009 - Manaslu, summit (8,163 m)
- 2010 - Manaslu, summit (8,163 m)
- 2011 - Lhotse, summit via West face (8,516m)
- 2011 - Ama Dablam, summit (6814 m)
- 2011 - Manaslu, summit (8,163 m)
- 2012 - Manaslu, summit (8,163 m)
- 2013 - Ama Dablam (6,250 m due to dangerous route)
- 2013 - Manaslu, summit (8,163 m)
- 2014 - Ama Dablam (6,500 m due to avalanche risk)
- 2014 - Manaslu, summit (8,163 m)
- 2017 - Manaslu, summit (8163 m)
- 2018 - Cho Oyo, summit (8,188 m)
- 2019 - Ama Dablam, summit (6814 m)
- 2022 - Thamserku (6300 m)

== See also ==
- Marco Siffredi
- List of Mount Everest summiteers by frequency
- List of 20th-century summiteers of Mount Everest
