= Yavaş =

Yavaş is a surname, having a few meanings like slow or gradual in the Persian and Turkish languages. Notable people with the surname include:

- Genç Osman Yavaş (born 1971), Turkish singer
- Lale Yavaş (born 1978), Swiss actress of Turkish origin
- Serhan Yavaş (born 1972), Turkish actor and model
- Mansur Yavaş (born 1955), Turkish politician (current Mayor of Ankara)
