= Sherpa (film) =

- Australian release poster
- Directed by: Jennifer Peedom
- Written by: Jennifer Peedom
- Produced by: John Smithson, Bridget Ikin
- Cinematography: Hugh Miller; Renan Öztürk; Ken Sauls
- Production company: Stranger Than Fiction
- Release date: 7 June 2015 (Sydney Film Festival)
- Running time: 90 minutes
- Countries: Australia, Nepal
- Languages: English; Nepali; Sherpa

Sherpa is a 2015 documentary film by Australian filmmaker Jennifer Peedom. It was filmed during the 2014 Mount Everest ice avalanche.

== Synopsis ==
Sherpa focuses on Phurba Tashi, a Sherpa who has made 21 Mount Everest ascents and leads the team for New Zealander Russell Brice's expedition company, Himex. Tashi's wife and family in Khumjung do not want him to keep risking his life climbing just for the money. The film explores some of the Sherpa culture and their spiritual relationship with the mountain, as well as the heavy work and risks Sherpas take in making multiple ascents to take equipment and supplies up the mountain and make the climb possible for foreign climbers.

After an ice avalanche kills 16 Sherpas, the focus shifts to the differing perspectives and understandings of the various groups in the following days. The Sherpas stage a protest meeting and most do not want to climb – some out of respect for the dead and others in order to push for better working conditions. Brice believes a small group of Sherpas have threatened to harm any Sherpas who do continue and for this reason decides to cancel his expedition, although Tashi notes that he is unaware of any such threats. The 2014 climbing season is cancelled and the closing titles note that Tashi honoured his family's wishes and retired. It also notes that the 2015 season was cancelled due to avalanches in the wake of the April 2015 Nepal earthquake.

The film contains archival footage of Tenzing Norgay and Edmund Hillary and includes interviews with Norgay's children.

== Production ==
Peedom intended to make a film about the 2014 Everest climbing season told from the Sherpas' point of view. The idea came about in response to violent confrontations between Sherpas and Europeans during the 2013 climbing season. The filmmakers were on location when an ice avalanche occurred on Everest's Khumbu Icefall, killing 16 Sherpas. This sparked a confrontation between the Sherpas, foreign expedition leaders and the Nepalese government regarding wages and conditions and resulted in a significant increase in compensation paid to victims' families.

The film was produced by Bridget Ikin and John Smithson for Stranger Than Fiction and financed by Screen Australia and a small number of private investors, along with presales from Universal Films and Footprint Films.

== Release ==
The film premiered at the 2015 Toronto International Film Festival in September 2015. It was released in the US in fall 2015, and was released in Australian theatres on 31 March 2016.

== Critical response ==
Film review aggregator Rotten Tomatoes reports that 97% of critics gave the film a positive rating, based on 34 reviews with an average score of 7.7/10. Patrick Peters of Empire magazine wrote: "...this is a spectacular, intimate and politically provocative exposé of the dangers, racial tensions and harsh economic realities on the world's highest mountain." Geoffrey MacNab of The Independent wrote: "No one here emerges in an especially positive light. There is bad faith on all sides but, amid all the bickering about money and safety, Peedom always also pays attention to the courage and selflessness of her subjects."

== Accolades ==
Year	Group/Award	Category	Recipient	Result	Ref.
2015	AACTA Awards (5th)	Best Feature Length Documentary	Bridget Ikin and John Smithson	Nominated	
2015	AACTA Awards (5th)	Best Cinematography in a Documentary	Renan Ozturk, Hugh Miller and Ken Sauls	Nominated	
2015	AACTA Awards (5th)	Best Editing in a Documentary	Christian Gazal	Nominated	
2015	AACTA Awards (5th)	Best Original Music Score in a Documentary	Antony Partos	Won	
2015	Australian Film Critics Association	Best Documentary Film (Local or International)	Sherpa	Won	
2015	BFI London Film Festival (59th)	Grierson Award for Best Documentary	Jennifer Peedom	Won	
2016	British Academy Film Awards (69th)	Best Documentary	Bridget Ikin, Jennifer Peedom and John Smithson	Nominated	
2016	APRA Music Awards	Best Soundtrack Album	Antony Partos	Won	
