= Tracee Metcalfe =

Mountaineer and internal medicine doctor

Tracee Lee Metcalfe is a mountaineer, backcountry skier and internal medicine physician from Vail, Colorado. Metcalfe received her M.D. from University of Colorado Denver's School of Medicine. She first started climbing eight-thousanders in 2015. Metcalfe is the first American woman to climb all 14 of the world's eight-thousanders.

== Background ==
Metcalfe grew up in Los Angeles, and first began climbing as a teenager. She began mountaineering in earnest after moving to Colorado in 1992, where she would go on to attend Colorado College. She graduated from medical school at the University of Colorado School of Medicine in 2003. She completed her medical residency in internal medicine in Seattle, and then moved back to Colorado to work at Vail Health Hospital.

In 2012, Metcalfe climbed Denali while volunteering with the National Park Service as a climbing ranger and expedition doctor. The experience encouraged her to look into working as a doctor for climbing expeditions. She would spend two years working with the National Park Service as a climbing ranger. The next year, Metcalfe began working with Russell Brice's Himalayan Experience as an expedition medic. She has continued to spend each climbing season working as a high-altitude expedition doctor, and established best practices in the field for other medics.

== High-altitude climbing ==
=== 2016 ===
On May 13, 2016, Metcalfe summited Mount Everest. To prepare for Everest, Metcalfe summited every 14,000 foot peak in Colorado. In September, she attempted Manaslu with a team led by Brice and Himalayan Experience. The expedition reached the fore-summit of the peak at 8,125m, as fixed ropes were not affixed higher on the mountain.

=== 2017 ===
As part of the International Mountain Guides Ama Dablam Expedition, Metcalfe summited 6,814m Ama Dablam on November 9, 2017. In 2017, she appeared as herself in Everest Rescue, a documentary miniseries filmed at Mount Everest while she was serving as expedition doctor for Brice's Himalayan Experience.

=== 2018 ===
Metcalfe joined the Japanese Active Mountain Cho Oyu Expedition to climb Cho Oyu. She summited the mountain on September 26, 2018.

=== 2019 ===
Metcalfe summited Makalu as part of the Expedition Base Makalu Expedition on May 15, 2019. The expedition took 26 days and left base camp via helicopter on May 20 at the conclusion of the expedition.

=== 2020 ===
Metcalfe was training to climb Kangchenjunga when she contracted COVID-19 in Montana. During the COVID-19 pandemic, her work as an internal medicine doctor took precedence over climbing.

=== 2021 ===
In January, Metcalfe was featured in an exhibition from the Colorado Snowsports Museum Hall of Fame, "Vail Women Climb Everest" series.

On April 16, Metcalfe summited Annapurna as part of an expedition led by Expedition Base. She described the climb as the hardest she had done to that point, harder than her previous climbs on Everest, Makalu, Cho Oyu and Ama Dablam. After climbing Annapurna, Metcalfe flew to Dhaulagiri, for an attempt on the world's seventh-highest peak with the Seven Summits Treks International Dhaulagiri Expedition. The expedition was eventually abandoned due to a COVID-19 outbreak amongst the climbing team.

=== 2022 ===
In 2022, Metcalfe summited Dhaulagiri on April 9 and Kangchenjunga on May 7 with expedition teams led by Imagine Nepal.

=== 2023 ===
In 2023, Metcalfe was on Shishapangma working as an expedition doctor when American climbers Gina Rzucidlo and Anna Gutu were challenging one another to be the first American woman to summit all 14 eight-thousanders. The pair were killed in an avalanche as they attempted their push to the summit. She was a personal friend of Rzucidlo, but was frustrated by how the competition between climbers changed the dynamics on the mountain. Due to unstable conditions on the mountain, she would not attempt the summit of Shishapangma that year, turning back after the first avalanche hit.

On July 2, 2023, Metcalfe summited Nanga Parbat as part of a 33-member international expedition. Metcalfe would then join a team from Imagine Nepal to climb K2. Her first attempt at summiting K2 was unsuccessful, and she turned back after a group of climbers at the Bottleneck made her attempt too risky. Her sherpa team let her head back to camp but encouraged her to stay on the mountain. After waiting for several days, she successfully summited on July 29 at 6:06am.

On September 21, 2023, Metcalfe successfully summited Manaslu at 5:53 in the morning.

=== 2024 ===
In 2024, Metcalfe climbed Lhotse, Gasherbrum I, Gasherbrum II Broad Peak and Shishapangma. She is now the first American woman to have climbed all 14 eight-thousanders.

== See also ==
- Eight thousanders
- Ellen Miller (mountaineer), Pioneering female alpinist and one of Metcalfe's coaches
