= Eylem Elif Maviş =

Turkish mountain climber

Eylem Elif Maviş, née Koç, (born November 9, 1973) is the first Turkish woman mountaineer to climb Mount Everest, the highest mountain on Earth.

Elif was born in Tokat, Turkey. She received her Bachelor of Science degree in environmental engineering and a Master of Science degree in business administration from the Middle East Technical University in Ankara. She holds another master's degree from the University of Iowa. A management systems specialist, she works as a software engineer.

On July 22, 2005, she successfully summited Gasherbrum II (8,035 m), the 14th highest peak of the world, with a Turkish team comprising six members. She and her teammate Burçak Özoğlu Poçan became the first Turkish women to climb over 8,000 m.

Elif reached the summit of Mount Everest (8848 m) as the first member of a Turkish expedition team on May 15, 2006, at 3:00 UTC, followed by three others Haldun Ülkenli, Serkan Girgin and Soner Büyükatalay. The team, sponsored by Petrol Ofisi, consisted of 11 mountaineers.
