= Apa Sherpa =

Nepalese mountain climber

Super Sherpa Apa
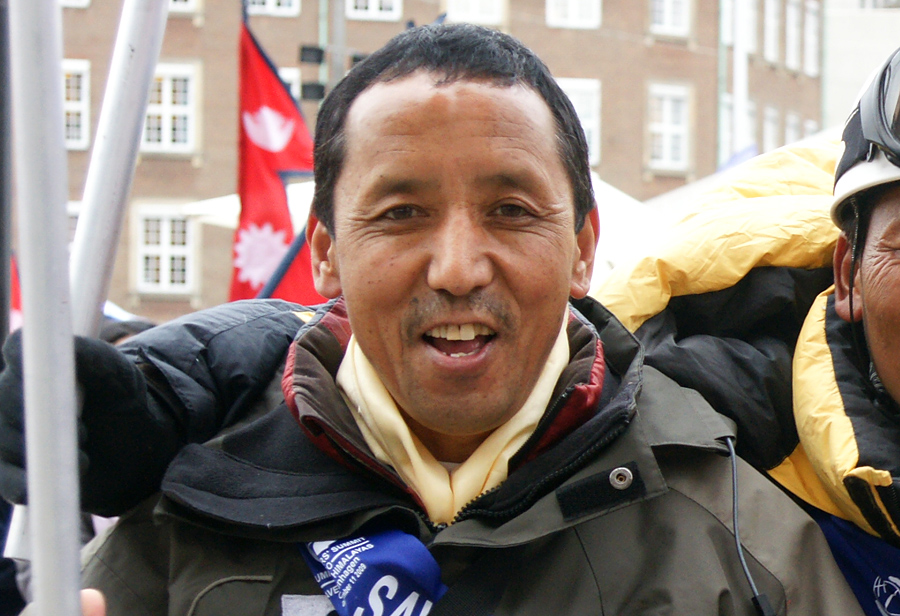
- Apa in 2009
- Born: Lhakpa Tenzing Sherpa; 20 January 1956 (age 70); Thame, Nepal
- Other name: Super Sherpa
- Citizenship: Nepalese
- Occupation: Mountaineering
- Years active: 1985–2011
- Known for: 21 ascents of Mount Everest
- Spouse: Yangjin Sherpa (m. 1988)
- Children: 4, including: Tenjing (son); Pemba (son); Dawa (daughter)

Apa Sherpa (Note: Nepali: Nickname: आपा शेर्पा • Birth name: ल्हाक्पा तेन्जिङ शेर्पा) (born 20 January 1960), is a Nepalese Sherpa mountaineer who, until 2017, jointly with Phurba Tashi held the record for reaching the summit of Mount Everest more times than any other climber. As part of The Eco Everest Expedition 2011, Apa made his 21st Mount Everest summit in May 2011 then retired after a promise to his wife to stop climbing after 21 ascents. He first summited Everest in 1990 and his last time to the summit was in 2011.

Apa met Edmund Hillary many times, and was on the Expedition with his son Peter Hillary in 1990, which was the first summit for both of them. Apa estimates he has been through the Khumbu Icefall about 1000 times and almost went with Rob Hall's ill-fated 1996 expedition.

When questioned about stopping at 21, Apa stated: "Everyone says 21 is a good number. I have to make my family happy. Every time I go, they worry because Everest is very risky." He was still the joint holder of the world record of Mount Everest summits as of 2017, with Phurba Tashi and Kami Rita Sherpa, but the record was broken in 2018 by Kami Rita Sherpa.

== Early life ==
Lhakpa Tenzing Sherpa was born in Thame, a village in the Everest region of Nepal, near the Chinese border. Following his father's death when he was 12 years old, Apa had to take up the responsibilities of his family, consisting of his mother, two sisters and three young brothers. He dropped out of school and earned money working as a porter for mountaineering groups. His climbing career began in 1985, and he worked as a kitchen boy and porter for various groups but was not given the opportunity to reach the summit until 1990.

== Personal life ==
Apa married Yangjin, then also a resident of Thame, in 1988 and has two sons—Tenjing and Pemba—and a daughter Dawa. A fourth child died in 2004. In December, 2006, the family moved to the United States with the help of his friend Jerry Mika to provide their children a better education and for business opportunities. They live in Draper, Utah.

In April 2009, Apa founded the Apa Sherpa Foundation, dedicated to the improvement of education and economic development in Nepal. Although he worked as a guide for years, he wants young people to have other career options. "The Sherpas do all the hard work and they were the only ones taken in this tragedy," he said in 2014 after 16 Sherpas died in an avalanche on 18 April. (In 2015, 10 Sherpas died at the Everest Base Camp after the avalanches in the wake of the April 2015 Nepal earthquake. In total, 118 Sherpas have died on Everest between 1921 and 2018.) "They are doing this [mountain guiding and portering] because they have ... no other choice to make money. With an education they have a choice. Our goal is to give the younger generation a chance to go to school so they don't have to climb."

When not on expeditions, Apa works for Diamond Mold, a precision machining and injection molding company in Salt Lake City, Utah that has also supported his foundation. He then began his career as Sirdar, or chief Sherpa, for many high altitude expeditions. Except for 1996 and 2001, he reached the summit every year between 1990 and 2011; all but three times have been in May. In 1992 he reached the summit twice.

Apa in his May 2010 Trek says that climbing to Everest has become tough due to the melting of ice and rock surfaces. He sees visible changes on the Everest summit due to global warming.

=== After retirement ===
After climbing Everest 21 times, he retired in 2011 and eventually moved to the Salt Lake City area of Utah but frequently travels to Nepal. In 2009, he co-founded The Apa Sherpa Foundation, a group striving to provide better education and an improved economy in Nepal.

=== Ascents of Mount Everest ===
Apa summitted Mount Everest a total of 21 times and also participated in unsuccessful attempts.

At one time, Apa held the world record with 21 ascents of Everest, which he then held jointly with Phurba Tashi and later, with Kami Rita Sherpa. In 2018 however, the latter made his 22nd ascent on 16 May, putting Apa and Tashi in a tie for second. In May 2019, Kami Rita Sherpa scaled Everest for the 23rd time, breaking his own record.

#	Date	Expedition
1	May 10, 1990	International
2	May 8, 1991	Sherpa Support/American Lhotse
3	May 12, 1992	New Zealand
4	October 7, 1992	Everest International
5	May 10, 1993	American
6	October 10, 1994	Everest International
7	May 15, 1995	American On Sagarmatha
8	April 26, 1997	Indonesian
9	May 20, 1998	EEE
10	May 26, 1999	Asian-Trekking
11	May 24, 2000	Everest Environmental Expedition
12	May 16, 2002	Swiss Everest 50th Anniversary Expedition 1952–2002
13	May 26, 2003	American Commemorative Expedition
14	May 17, 2004	Dream Everest Expedition 2004
15	May 31, 2005	Climbing for a cure
16	May 19, 2006	Team No Limit
17	May 16, 2007	Super Sherpas
18	May 22, 2008	The Eco Everest Expedition
19	May 21, 2009	The Eco Everest Expedition
20	May 22, 2010	The Eco Everest Expedition
21	May 11, 2011	The Eco Everest Expedition

On his 19th expedition, the team spent half an hour at the top of the mountain, unfurling a banner that said "Stop Climate Change". The team brought down five tonnes of mountain trash that includes parts of a crashed helicopter, tin cans and climbing material. On this expedition, a friend and fellow Sherpa, Lhakpa Nuru, was swept away in an avalanche on May 7, 2009, and died.

== Great Himalayan Trail ==
In April 2012, he successfully led the first expedition to complete the Great Himalaya Trail, a 1,700-kilometre (1,050-mile) trek spanning the entire length of the Nepalese Himalayas. The Great Himalaya Trail is considered to be one of the world's most difficult treks. Sherpa and three companions set off in January on the Climate Smart Celebrity Trek, an expedition promoting tourism and highlighting the effects of climate change. The adventurers set out from the shadow of the world's third-highest peak, Mount Kanchenjunga, in the east and finished at Nepal's border with Tibet in the west, 20 days ahead of schedule. Along the way they traversed some of the world's most rugged landscapes, ascending beyond 6,000 metres (19,600 feet). Dawa Steven Sherpa, a member of the expedition who has climbed Everest twice, said the group found mountain communities that rely on subsistence farming were suffering the effects of climate change.

== See also ==
- List of Mount Everest summiters by number of times to the summit
- List of 20th-century summiters of Mount Everest
- Lhakpa Sherpa
- Phurba Tashi
