= Thame, Nepal =

Thame थामे
- Village
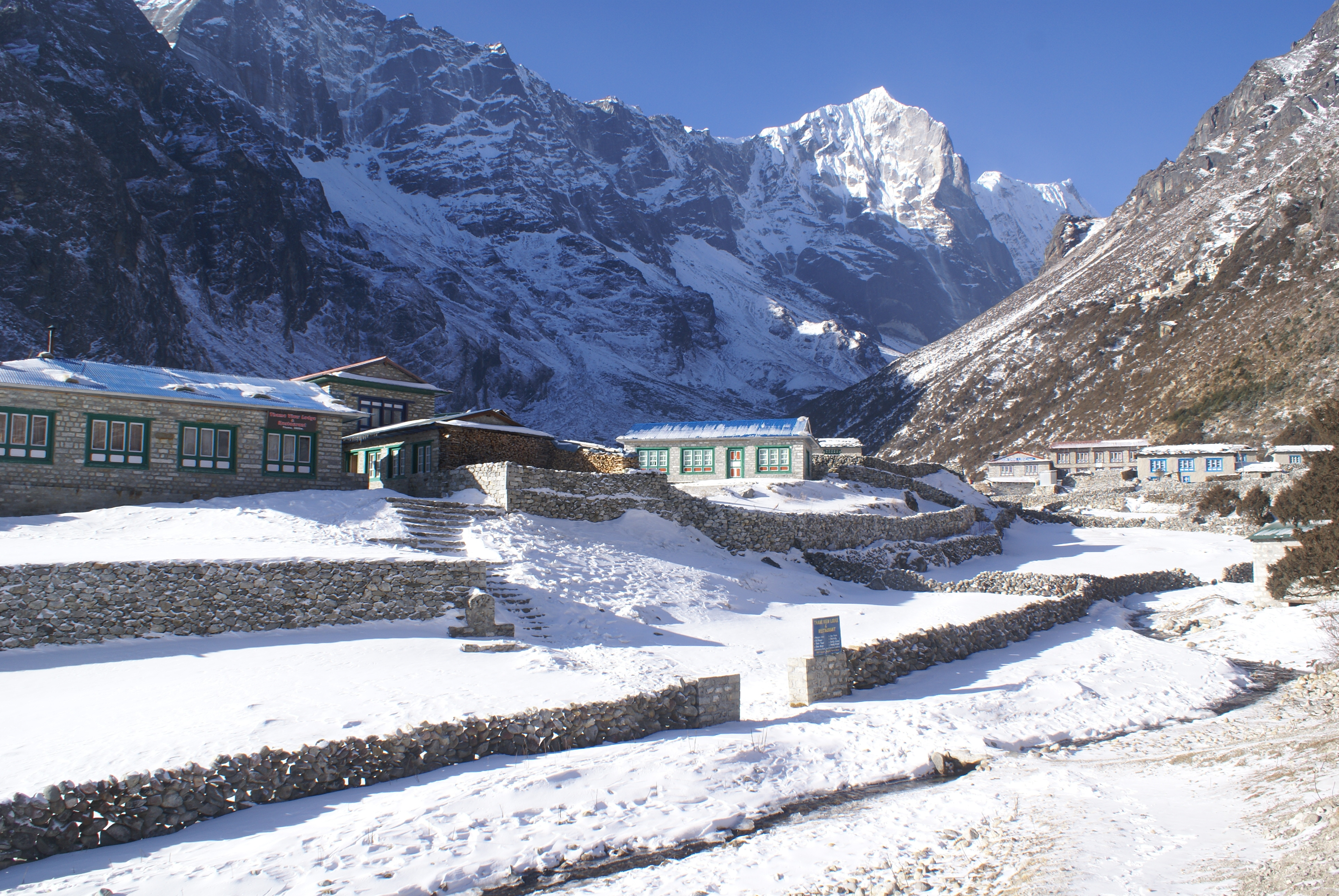
- Thame in snow
- Interactive map of Thame
- Coordinates: 27.831°N 86.65°E
- Country: Nepal
- Province: Koshi
- District: Solukhumbu
- Time zone: UTC+5:45 (NST)

Thame (Nepali: थामे) and its neighbouring Thameteng (upper Thame) are small Sherpa villages in Namche VDC of the Solukhumbu District in Nepal. These were the last year-round villages on the salt trading route that existed between Tibet, India, and Nepal. Thame is home to many famous Sherpa mountaineers, including Apa Sherpa and Kami Rita Sherpa.

== History ==
Apa Sherpa previously held the world record for summiting Mount Everest 21 times. Kami Rita Sherpa who has scaled the mountain 28 times as of 23 May 2023 currently holds the record. It was also the childhood home of Tenzing Norgay. He and Sir Edmund Hillary were the first confirmed men to climb Mount Everest. It is also where the famous Lama Zopa Rinpoche, the Lawudo Lama, head of the FPMT, was born. The Thame monastery is one of the oldest in the Khumbu region, and is famous for the annual Mani Rimdu festival.

In October 1995, a small hydro power plant was opened near Thame, with an installed capacity of 600 kW. It is operated by the Khumbu Bijuli Company.

On 16 August 2024, the village was inundated by a glacial lake outburst flood that destroyed at least 15 structures.
