= Kami Rita =

Record-setting Sherpa mountain climber of highest peaks

Everest Man Kami Rita
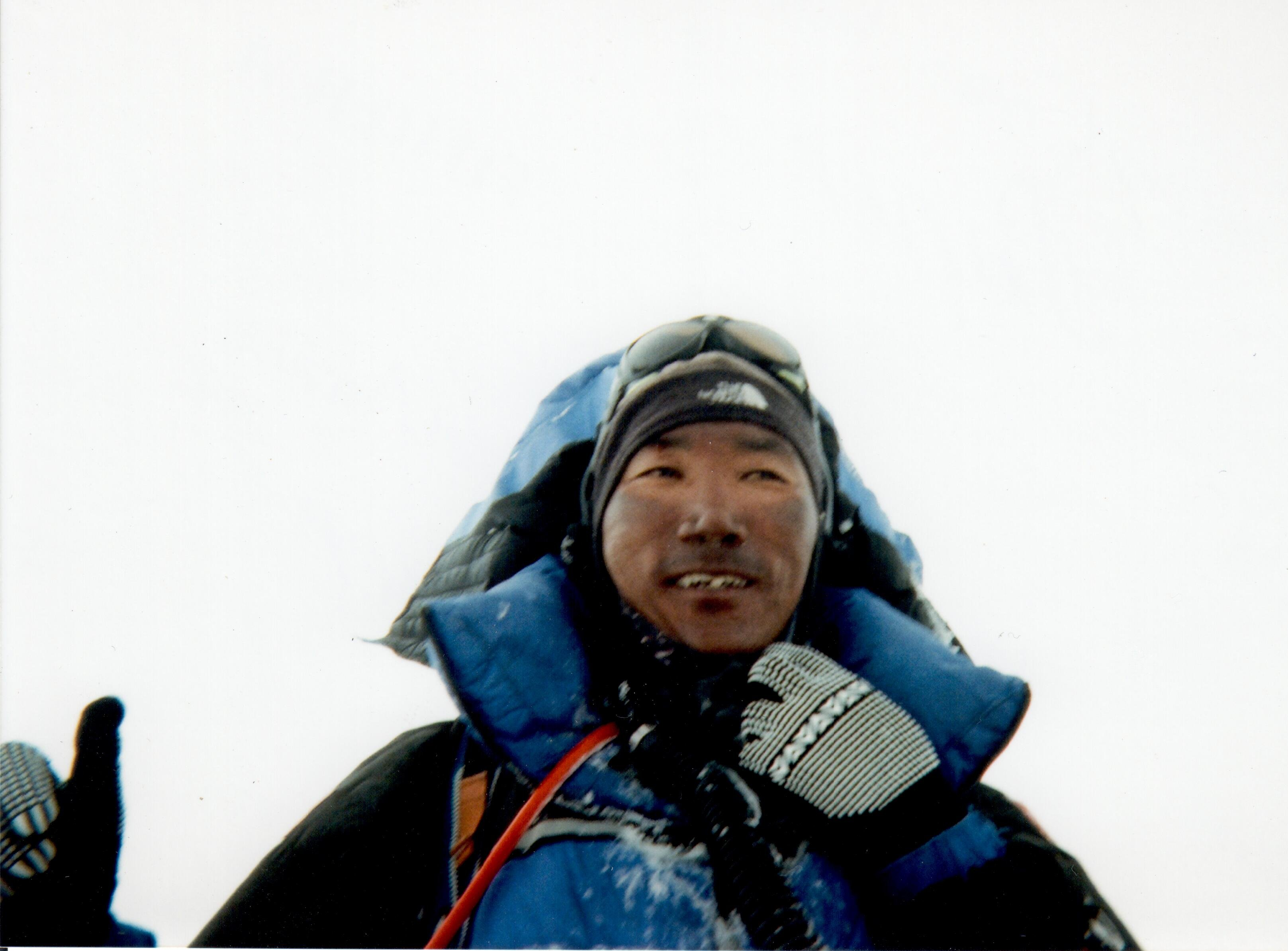
- Rita in 2010
- Born: Kami Rita Sherpa; 17 January 1970 (age 56); Thame, Nepal
- Other name: Everest Man
- Citizenship: Nepali
- Occupation: Mountaineering
- Years active: 1992–present
- Known for: 32 ascents of Mount Everest
- Spouse: Lakpa Jangmu
- Children: 2

Kami Rita Sherpa (Nepali: कामीरिता शेर्पा, romanized: Kāmīritā Śerpā; born 17 January 1970) is a Nepalese Sherpa guide who holds the record for most ascents to the summit of Mount Everest. He has held the record since May 2018. Most recently, he scaled Everest for the 32nd time on 17 May 2026, breaking his own record set on 27 May 2025. His father was among the first professional Sherpa guides after Everest was opened to foreign mountaineers in 1950. His brother Lakpa Rita, also a guide, has scaled Everest 17 times.

In 2017, Rita was the third person to reach the summit of Mount Everest 21 times, sharing this record with Apa Sherpa and Phurba Tashi Sherpa. The latter two subsequently retired.

On 16 May 2018, at age 48, Rita became the first person in the world to climb Mount Everest 22 times, achieving the record of the most summits on the 8,848-meter (29,031-foot) peak. In April of that year, he told the news media that he planned to scale Everest 25 times before retirement, "not just for myself but for my family, the Sherpa people and for my country, Nepal"; He completed his 31st summit of Everest on 27 May 2025.

In addition to his Everest summits, his totals include Cho-Oyu eight times (2001, 2004, 2006, 2009, 2011, 2013, 2014 and 2016), Lhotse (2011), K2 (2014) and Manaslu (2023).

== Career ==
According to Rita's brother Lakpa Rita, Kami's first work on a mountain was in 1992, assisting a Base Camp cook. Another report, however, states that he was already working as a porter, transporting gear to the Everest base camp, at age 12. By age 24, he had scaled Everest.

In 2018, Rita told a journalist that the government does not support the mountaineering guides. "We are famous around the world. Many foreigners know us, but our government doesn't care about us." He said that when Ang Rita Sherpa was hospitalised in Kathmandu in 2017 after a brain haemorrhage, the government provided no support. Although climbing is safer than in the past because of superior equipment and weather forecasts, the occupation is still dangerous, he told a reporter in 2018. "The crevasses are deep and the slopes are unpredictable," Rita said. An April 2018 report by NPR stated that Sherpas account for one-third of Everest deaths.

In 2018, Rita was earning about $10,000 for each Everest climb because of his extensive previous experience. The highest peaks in Nepal are less dangerous around May of each year; in the autumn, he guides clients up the country's smaller peaks.

As of May 2019, he was employed by Seven Summit Treks, a company that arranges climbing expeditions. Prior to 2018, he had been employed by an American firm, Alpine Ascents International. From August 2019, he has served as a Brand Ambassador and the Chief Adventure Consultant of Himalayan Glacier Adventure and Travel Company. He has no plans to retire as long as his body is physically able to handle the climbing. Rita is also a brand ambassador for a cement product, Brij Super Premium OPC, manufactured in Nepal.

There is also another Kami Rita Sherpa who works on Everest and had completed his 16th summit in 2017 with Adventure Consultants.

Rita summited Everest on 7 May 2021, breaking his own record with his 25th ascent, and again summited Everest on 7 May 2022, breaking his own record with his 26th ascent. On 17 May 2023, three days after fellow sherpa Pasang Dawa completed his 26th ascent, matching the record, Rita reclaimed his title by completing his 27th climb of Mount Everest. On 22 May 2023, Pasang Dawa equalized the record again by summiting Mount Everest for the 27th time. On 23 May, Rita scaled Everest extending his record to 28. He scaled Everest on 27 May 2025, extending his record to 31. On 17 May 2026, he broke his own record by scaling Everest for the 32nd time.

== Personal life ==
Rita was born and grew up in Thame, a small village in the Solukhumbu district of Nepal, living with his large family in a one-room house. Thame is also the birthplace of other famous mountaineering Sherpas, including Tenzing Norgay who (alongside Sir Edmund Hillary) achieved the first ascent of Mount Everest in 1953. In his youth, he had considered becoming a monk and spent some time at the Thame Dechen Chokhorling monastery but decided not to proceed with this vocation.

A 2018 report stated that Rita lives with his wife, Lakpa Jangmu, and two children in Kathmandu. He has ensured that his children are getting an education to enable them to choose occupations that are less dangerous than guiding mountaineers. "We were illiterate and poor and there were no other means of survival [back then]. As a result, we were compelled to climb dangerous mountains to eke out a living," he told a journalist.

In another 2018 report, Lakpa Jangmu is quoted as saying that she wished that her husband would retire from mountaineering. "I keep telling him we could look for other jobs, start a small business. But he does not listen to me at all." She also confirmed that their children will not become mountain guides.

== Everest expeditions ==
Expedition timeline:

Everest Summits and Attempts
Year	Date / Height	Route	Position / Remarks
1994	13 May	S Col - SE Ridge	High Altitude Worker
1995	Up to 8500m	S Col - SE Ridge	High Altitude Worker
1997	25 May	S Col - SE Ridge	Climber
1998	25 May	S Col - SE Ridge	High Altitude Worker
1999	13 May	S Col - SE Ridge	High Altitude Worker
2000	23 May	S Col - SE Ridge	High Altitude Worker
2002	25 May	S Col - SE Ridge	High Altitude Worker
2003	30 May	S Col - SE Ridge	High Altitude Worker
2004	24 May	S Col - SE Ridge	High Altitude Worker
2005	30 May	S Col - SE Ridge	High Altitude Worker
2006	20 May	S Col - SE Ridge	High Altitude Worker
2007	22 May	S Col - SE Ridge	High Altitude Worker
2008	24 May	S Col - SE Ridge	High Altitude Worker
2009	5 May 23 May	S Col - SE Ridge	Rope Fixing Team / High Altitude Worker
2010	5 May 24 May	S Col - SE Ridge	Rope Fixing Team / High Altitude Worker
2012	18 May	S Col - SE Ridge	High Altitude Worker
2013	10 May 22 May	S Col - SE Ridge	Rope Fixing Team / High Altitude Worker
2016	20 May	N Col - NE Ridge	High Altitude Worker
2017	27 May	S Col - SE Ridge	High Altitude Worker
2018	16 May	S Col - SE Ridge	High Altitude Worker
2019	15 May 21 May	S Col - SE Ridge	High Altitude Worker
2021	7 May	S Col - SE Ridge	High Altitude Worker
2022	7 May	S Col - SE Ridge	High Altitude Worker
2023	17 May, 23 May	S Col - SE Ridge	High Altitude Worker
2024	12 May, 22 May	S Col - SE Ridge	High Altitude Worker
2025	27 May	S Col - SE Ridge	High Altitude Worker

== See also ==
- List of Mount Everest summiters by number of times to the summit
- List of 20th-century summiters of Mount Everest
- Lhakpa Sherpa
- Phurba Tashi
