= Ellen Miller (mountaineer) =

American mountaineer

Ellen Elizabeth Miller (born c. 1959) is an American mountaineer, fitness coach and community activist from Vail, Colorado. Over a 25-year career in high altitude mountaineering, she became the first and only American woman to summit Mount Everest from both the North and the South approaches and was the first American woman to climb the "Himalayan Triple Crown", summiting Nuptse, Everest and Lhotse.

== Biography ==
Miller grew up in Asheville, North Carolina. In her youth, she was not fast enough to join her school's track team. When she was 19, she moved to Colorado where she pursued outdoor sports and running with enthusiasm, becoming one of the early pioneers of the sport of skyrunning.

=== Climbing career ===
Miller began climbing as a young woman, first climbing in Coloardo and then in Mexico. She gained experience climbing before travelling to Alaska to climb Denali. Then she spent 25 years working seasonally in the Himalayas as a trekking guide. Over her mountaineering career, she has summited Cho Oyu (1999), Mustagh-Ata, Ama Dablam, Acocagua, Manaslu, Mt. Elbrus, and Kilimanjaro. She has additionally climbed all significant Ecuadoran volcanoes and all 54 of Colorado's 14,000 foot peaks.

In 2001, she first climbed Mount Everest, from the Tibetan approach.

In 2002, she was named Colorado Sportswoman of the Year. That year, she summited Mount Everest from the Nepal Side. In May 2009, she became the second American woman to climb Lhotse, after her friend Christine Boskoff. Miller dedicated her climb to Boskoff. That fall, Miller had her second hip replacement, and was unsure if she would be able to continue mountaineering. In 2003, she returned to Everest for the 50th anniversary of the mountain's first summit, but was unable to climb when the Nepalese government limited climbing permits. In Nepal, she married international mountaineering guide Bill Crouse in a Nepalese style wedding.

In May 2012, she completed the Himalayan Triple Crown, after summiting Nuptse, becoming the first American woman to accomplish the feat. At the time of her summit of Nuptse, only 20 people had previously summited the mountain. In 2013 at age 54 she announced her retirement from high altitude mountaineering, but not climbing. At the time she said,

“I’m always going to climb mountains...I just feel like my days above 22,000, 23,000 feet are over. There are other mountains around the world I’ve had my eye on that I would love to do...As I get older, the most important thing I’m learning about climbing is that at the end of the day, when I’m 85 years old, it’s not going to be about the summits I’ve checked off my list. It’s going to be about the people and the relationships and the beautiful days I spent with different people."

=== Skyrunning and coaching ===
In the 1990s, Miller was a part of the Fila Skyrunning Team, where she competed internationally as a professional adventure racer. For over 16 years she worked as the coach and manager of the USA Women's Mountain Running Team. After having four hip surgeries, Miller no longer competes in skyrunning competitions, dedicating her work to coaching others.

A USATF certified endurance coach, she founded Mountain Divas in Vail to train women in altitude and endurance sports. In addition to her fitness coaching, Miller works as a caregiver for the elderly in Vail and teaches yoga.

Miller was one of the coaches of Tracee Metcalfe, the first American woman to summit all 14 eight-thousanders in 2024.

=== Volunteering and philanthropy ===
Miller founded the Vail Mountain Winter Uphill Race and The Climb for Literacy to promote access to the outdoors and reading. Both enterprises are run as philanthropic ventures. She volunteers as a Vail Trail Host and wildlife ambassador in Vail. In 2021 she was named the Vail Valley Mountain Trails Alliance Volunteer of the year.
