= Everest: Beyond the Limit =

- Season 2 Logo of Everest: Beyond the Limit
- Starring: Season 1: Russell Brice, Maxime Chaya, Mark Inglis, Brent Merrell, Terry O'Connor; Season 2: Russell Brice, Rod Babar, Monica Piris, Phurba Tashi, Katsusuke Yanagisawa, Fred Ziel
- Country of origin: United States
- No. of seasons: 3
- No. of episodes: 19

Production
- Running time: 60 Minutes

Original release
- Network: Discovery Channel
- Release: November 14, 2006 – December 30, 2009

Everest: Beyond the Limit is a Discovery Channel reality television series about yearly attempts to summit Mount Everest organized and led by New Zealander Russell Brice.

== Plot summary ==
For the first season, a 17-member production crew followed 11 climbers, three guides, and a team of Sherpas up the mountain in April and May 2006. The first season's six-part series included double-amputee Mark Inglis' ascent and brief footage of British climber David Sharp, who died in the attempt. The series was shot using high altitude equipment and helmet mounted cameras worn by Sherpas.

In the second season, biker Tim Medvetz and Danish asthmatic Mogens Jensen returned to successfully summit despite Jensen's initial unwillingness to use oxygen and Medvetz's accidental fall and hand injury. Jensen nearly died on the descent when a piton attached to a rock pass came loose and he fell fifteen feet off the slope. Rod Baber ascended ahead of Medvetz with a cell phone battery taped to his chest, which upon summiting he used to make a mobile phone call to his family. Millionaire David Tait attempted the first double-traverse of Everest, planning to ascend the north side, descend the south, and make the return trip. Tait reached the south side base but declined to complete his plan as he had lagged behind Phurba Tashi. Fred Ziel completed his first summit of Everest from the north side (he had previously failed twice after climbing the south), while Katsusuke Yanagisawa—at age 71—became the oldest man to summit Everest as of 2007. Yanagi experienced intermittent throat pain but was otherwise completely healthy upon his return to base camp. The following day, Brice presented him with a gift before packing up camp.

The third season of Everest premiered on Discovery on December 27, 2009. The series followed Russell Brice's Himex team as they, this time, climbed the South face, which is well known for such obstacles as the Hillary step and the Khumbu icefall. David Tait also made a surprise return to the show to climb Everest for a third time, this time without oxygen.

Following the last four episodes of the second season of Everest, the Discovery Channel aired an After the Climb segment similar to the Deadliest Catch series' After the Catch. Phil Keoghan hosted discussions on several subjects with the show's participants and several well-known climbers, including Peter Hillary. Common topics included meteorology, dangers such as frostbite and oxygen starvation, equipment (especially the use of oxygen), and the workings of Brice's business.

== List of episodes ==
=== Season 1 ===
No.	Title	Original release date
1	"Summit Dreams"	November 14, 2006
2	"The Gatekeeper"	November 21, 2006
3	"To the Summit"	November 28, 2006
4	"Into the Death Zone"	December 5, 2006
5	"Mutiny on the Mountain"	December 12, 2006
6	"The Final Cost"	December 19, 2006

=== Season 2 ===
No.	Title	Original release date
1	"Dream Chasers"	October 30, 2007
2	"On the Ropes"	November 6, 2007
3	"Judgment Day"	November 13, 2007
4	"World Record"	November 20, 2007
5	"Long Way Down"	November 27, 2007
6	"The Death Zone"	December 4, 2007
7	"Breaking Point"	December 11, 2007
8	"Now or Never"	December 18, 2007

=== Season 3 ===
No.	Title	Original release date
1	"First Summit"	December 27, 2009
2	"Impossible Dream"	December 27, 2009
3	"Deadly Countdown"	December 27, 2009
4	"Death Zone Gridlock"	December 30, 2009
5	"One Last Breath"	December 30, 2009
