= Burçak Özoğlu Poçan =

Turkish mountain climber

Burçak Poçan, née Özoğlu, (born 4 January, 1970 in Ankara) is a mountaineer and one of the first Turkish women to climb above 8,000 m.

Following her graduation from the School of Business Administration at the Middle East Technical University in Ankara with a BA degree, she earned a MA and PhD degree in labor economics from the School of Political Sciences at Ankara University. Burçak is currently a lecturer at the same university.

In 1989, she enrolled in a four-year mountaineering course while studying at the Middle East Technical University. In 1995 she made the first female ascent of the north face of Mount Büyük Demirkazık (3,756 m) in Turkey. She climbed Mount Elbrus (5,642 m) in the Caucasus in 1996 and in the same year climbed Khan Tengri (7,010 m) in the Tian Shan range, setting a height record at the time for a Turkish woman. In 1997, she climbed Mount Damavand (5,610 m), the highest peak in Iran.

She became one of the first Turkish women to climb over 8,000 m when she summited Gasherbrum II (8,035 m), the 13th highest peak of the world, via the west face together with Eylem Elif Maviş, on July 22, 2005.

Burçak took part in the Petrol Ofisi-sponsored Turkish expedition team to Mount Everest in 2006. However, due to throat problems at 8,600 m, she was forced to abandon the ascent on May 15 and return to the advanced base camp for medical assistance. She reached the summit on her second attempt on May 24, 2006, along with five other teammates, including two women.

Burçak is married to mountaineer Serhan Poçan, who summited Mount Everest on the same day as her.

== Awards ==
- 1996 "Mountaineer of the Year" by the Turkish Mountain Climbing Federation
