= Himex =

Mount Everest guiding company

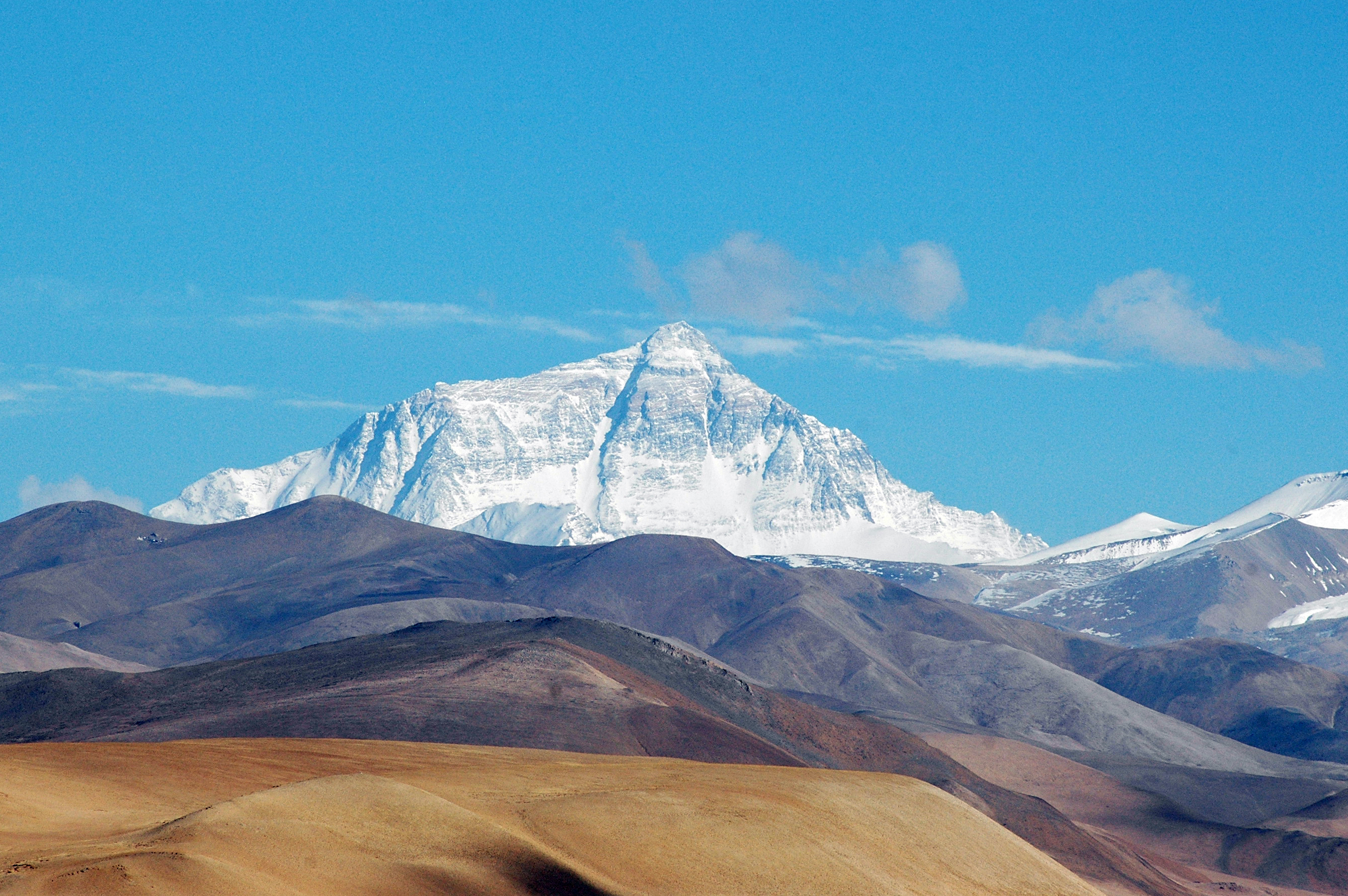
Mount Everest from the northern side

Himex is a Mount Everest guiding company. It was founded in 1996 by New Zealander Russell Brice. The name is a truncated version of the full name "Himalayan Experience". National Geographic said Himex was the "largest and most sophisticated guiding operation on Everest" in a 2013 article. Himex's team is known for fixing lines on Mount Everest, although in 2012 other teams did this work.

Three of the expeditions of this company were filmed in the television show Everest: Beyond the Limit between 2006 and 2009. In 2013, David Tait achieved his fifth Mount Everest summiting with a Himex team. (see also List of Mount Everest summiteers by frequency)

Brice has pushed for many years to use helicopters to fly gear over the Khumbu Icefall to the Nepal-side Camp I, to enhance safety. In the aftermath of the 2015 Nepal earthquakes Himex pulled out from summiting Everest that season.

A distinctive feature of Himex's Mount Everest base camp is the social tent, the "Tiger Dome", about 50 feet (15 m) across, climate controlled and with a large window to look out of, offering espresso, wine and other drinks, and television, music, web-connected computers, and gaming devices.

== Timeline ==
In 2015 Himex attempted an expedition to K2 but had to turn back due to avalanche risk.

In 2016, Himex employed 21-time Everest summiteer Phurba Tashi, who did not make a summit but in 2016 who was mourning the loss of both his parents. Himex did go to Everest and even managed to finish early. They used the extra time to refurbish some of the gear, such as (re)painting tent poles.

== People of Himex ==
Russell Brice founded Himex in 1996 and has also been the lead guide.

One of the people from Nepal who has worked for Himex is Phurba Tashi

Climber and guide Adrian Ballinger worked for Himex until 2012. Ballinger then started a climbing company called "Alpenglow Expeditions".

Dr. Tracee Metcalfe has served as an expedition doctor for Himex, climbing Mount Everest with the team in 2016.

== See also ==
- 1996 Mount Everest disaster
- List of Mount Everest guides
- Adventure Consultants
- Asian Trekking
