= Maxime Chaya =

Lebanese mountaineer (born 1961)

- مكسيم شعيا
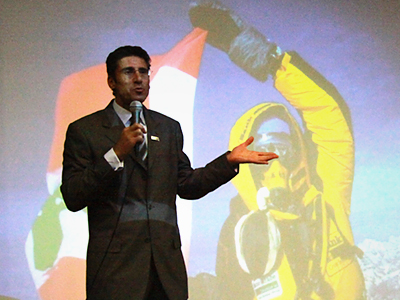
- 'There is an Everest for Everyone'
- Born: December 16, 1961 (age 64); Beirut, Lebanon
- Education: London School of Economics and Political Science
- Occupations: Sportsman, Climber, Explorer, Professional Speaker, Corporate Ambassador
- Spouse: Pascale Melhem Kesrouani (Poupa)
- Children: Edgard & Kelly
- Awards: Officer of the National Order of the Cedar
- Website: www.maximechaya.com

Signature
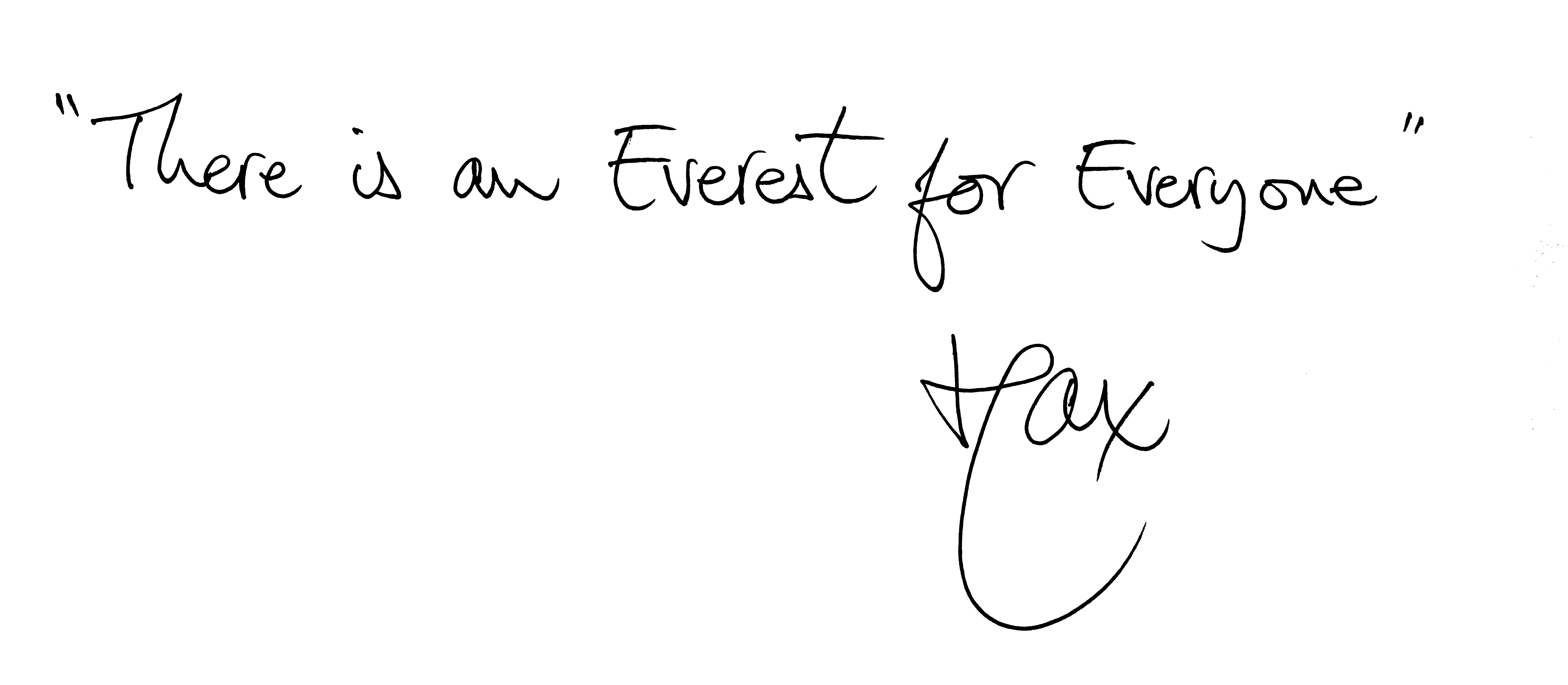

Maxime Chaya (Arabic: مكسيم شعيا; born 16 December 1961) is a Lebanese mountaineer and cross-disciplinary athlete, known best for being the first Lebanese to climb Mount Everest and the Seven Summits.

Chaya also became the first from the Middle East to reach the South Pole on foot from the Antarctic coast, and the North Pole on foot in 2009.

== Biography ==
Maxime Edgard Chaya was born and raised in Beirut until the year 1975 when the civil war saw him and his family take refuge abroad. He pursued his education overseas in Greece, France, Canada, and the United Kingdom, graduating with a Bachelor of Science Honors degree from the London School of Economics (LSE).

After briefly training as a banker in New York, Chaya returned to Lebanon to run a family foreign exchange business. In 1999, he founded his own company VO2max, organizing races and competitions for Lebanese youth in cycling, triathlon, road running, trail-running, rock climbing, ski touring, and freeride from 1999 to 2003.

As an individual athlete, Chaya has won awards and trophies in several disciplines, both at national and international level.

From 2003 on, Chaya partnered with Bank Audi on a ‘Seven Summits Project’; to climb each of the Seven Summits and raise the Lebanese flag.

On August 5, 2013, Chaya and his two crew-mates beat the world speed record in rowing the Indian Ocean. The three, Chaya, the Faroese Livar Nysted, and the British Stuart Kershaw crossed 5,801 kilometres (3,132 nmi) from Geraldton, Western Australia and rowed alternatively, in 57 days, 19 hours, 25 minutes and 52 seconds. They were also the first crew of three ever to cross any ocean.

In December 2016, Maxime and his British friend and teammate Steve Holyoak were the first ever to cross a sand desert on bicycles, crossing the Empty Quarter from Abu Dhabi, UAE to Salalah, Oman some 1,500 km later, after 21 days.

Chaya now resides in Lebanon with his two children: Edgard and Kelly.

== Expeditions ==
In 2000, while on a visit to Kenya for an international mountain biking stage race that he won, Chaya went on to climb Mount Kilimanjaro in nearby Tanzania.

Over the next three years, Chaya completed the 'Seven Summits' (the highest peak on each continent), raising the Lebanese flag upon each completion. He subsequently went on to achieve the 'Three Poles'.

In 2006, Discovery Channel launched a reality television series entitled Everest: Beyond the Limit, with Chaya featured in the original series.

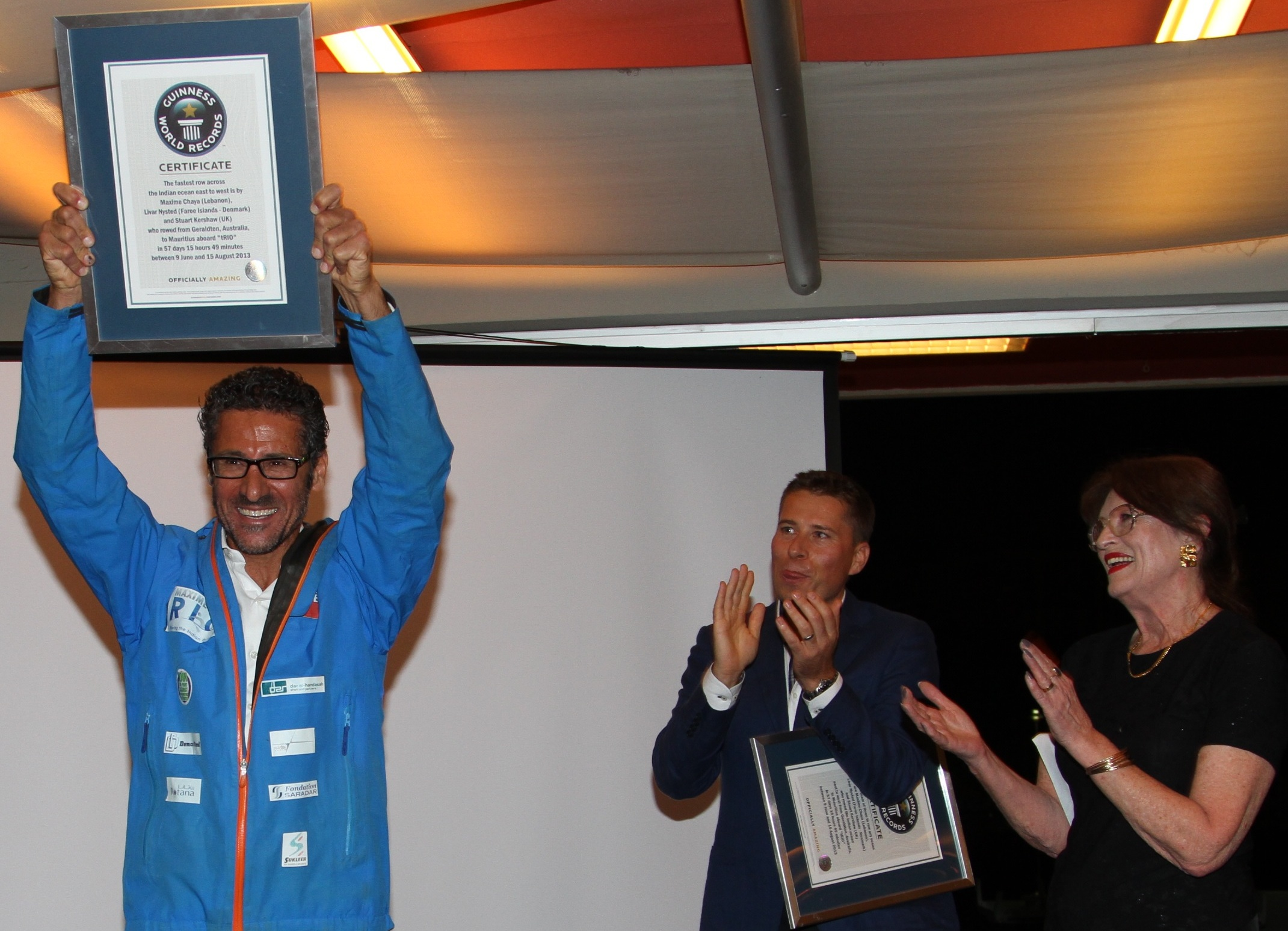
Maxime Chaya receiving Guinness world record for achieving the fastest row across the Indian Ocean east to west from Geraldton, Australia to Mauritius aboard "tRIO" in 57 days 15 hours 49 minutes between 9 June and 15 August 2013

Chaya stated in interviews regarding his Everest expedition that both reaching the summit and returning safely should not be taken for granted, emphasizing the risks involved in high-altitude mountaineering.

On May 15, 2006, Chaya encountered a dying climber, David Sharp, on his way down from the summit of Everest in a cave in the Death Zone, alongside the body of another casualty. The climbing group tried to resuscitate Sharp for over an hour at great personal risk, but was unable to do so.

Chaya subsequently went on to achieve the Three Poles Challenge. He reached the South Pole – S90 – unassisted and unsupported on December 28, 2007, after setting off from the Hercules Inlet 48 days earlier with his teammates from Canada, Great Britain, Norway and Switzerland. A year and a half later, on April 25, 2009, Chaya and his two teammates from the USA reached the North Pole – N90 – after 53 days on the ice, unassisted. He then became the 16th person to achieve the Three Poles Challenge and the 6th ever to achieve both the Seven Summits and the Three Poles Challenge.

After years of planning, preparation and training he set off from Geraldton, Western Australia on June 9, 2013 aboard his rowboat "tRIO". Along with his two crewmates from the Faroe Islands and Great Britain they reached Mauritius 57 days later on August 5. The trio were awarded two Guinness World Records when the Ocean Rowing Society homologated their time as the fastest row across the Indian Ocean in 57 days 15 hours 49 minutes. They were also the first three-man crew ever to row an ocean.

Chaya is believed to be the only person ever to have succeeded in climbing the Seven Summits, reaching the Three Poles Challenge and rowing an ocean.

== Inspirational speaking ==
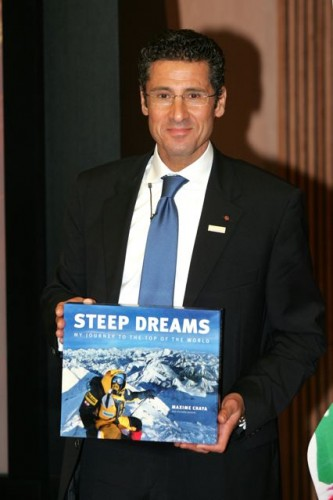
Max Chaya Launching his book Steep Dreams: My Journey to the Top of the World at Salon du Livre in BIEL Beirut.

Chaya has toured several schools, businesses, and clubs, delivering inspirational talks to guests. He is also on the Board of the Beirut Marathon, and has engaged in several public appearances for aligned charities and NGOs.

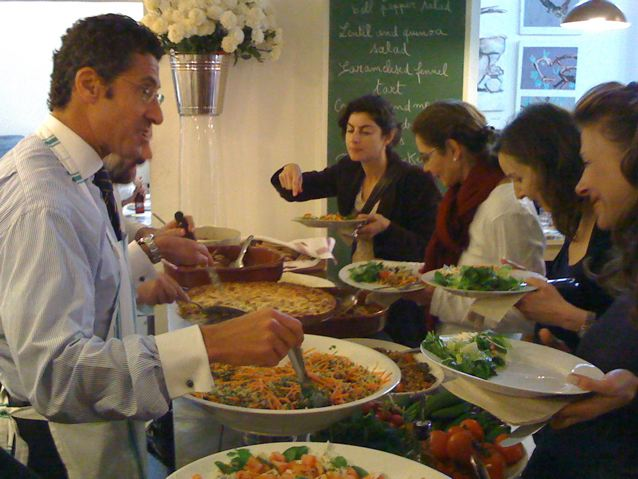
Chaya serving the guests and donors at a Toufoula fundraising event.

== Major sporting achievements ==
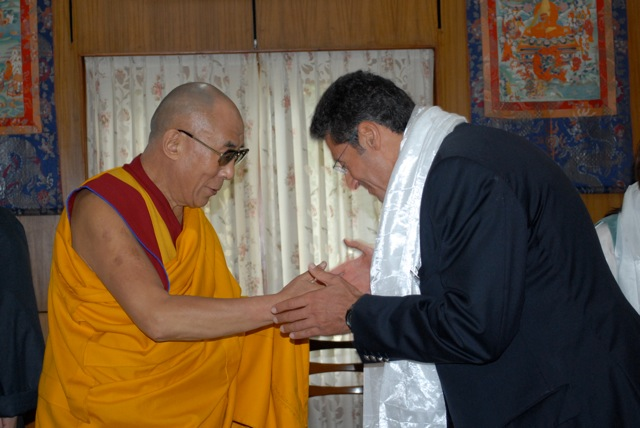
Chaya visiting the 14th Dalai Lama in Dharamsala, India.

=== National ===
- National champion in several disciplines including squash, cross-country skiing and cycling
- Four times winner of the Redbull Sno-to-Sea (Lebanon – 2003 to 2006)

=== International ===
- 2nd overall: "Trophée du Nil" (Egypt – 1998)
- 3rd overall: "Raid Thai" (Thailand – 1999)
- 1st place: "Kenya Sports Safari" (Kenya – 2001)
- 23rd: UCI World Masters Championships (Canada – 2001)
- Among the first Lebanese to complete an "Ironman" triathlon (the Netherlands – 2002)

=== Climbed peaks and reached landmarks ===
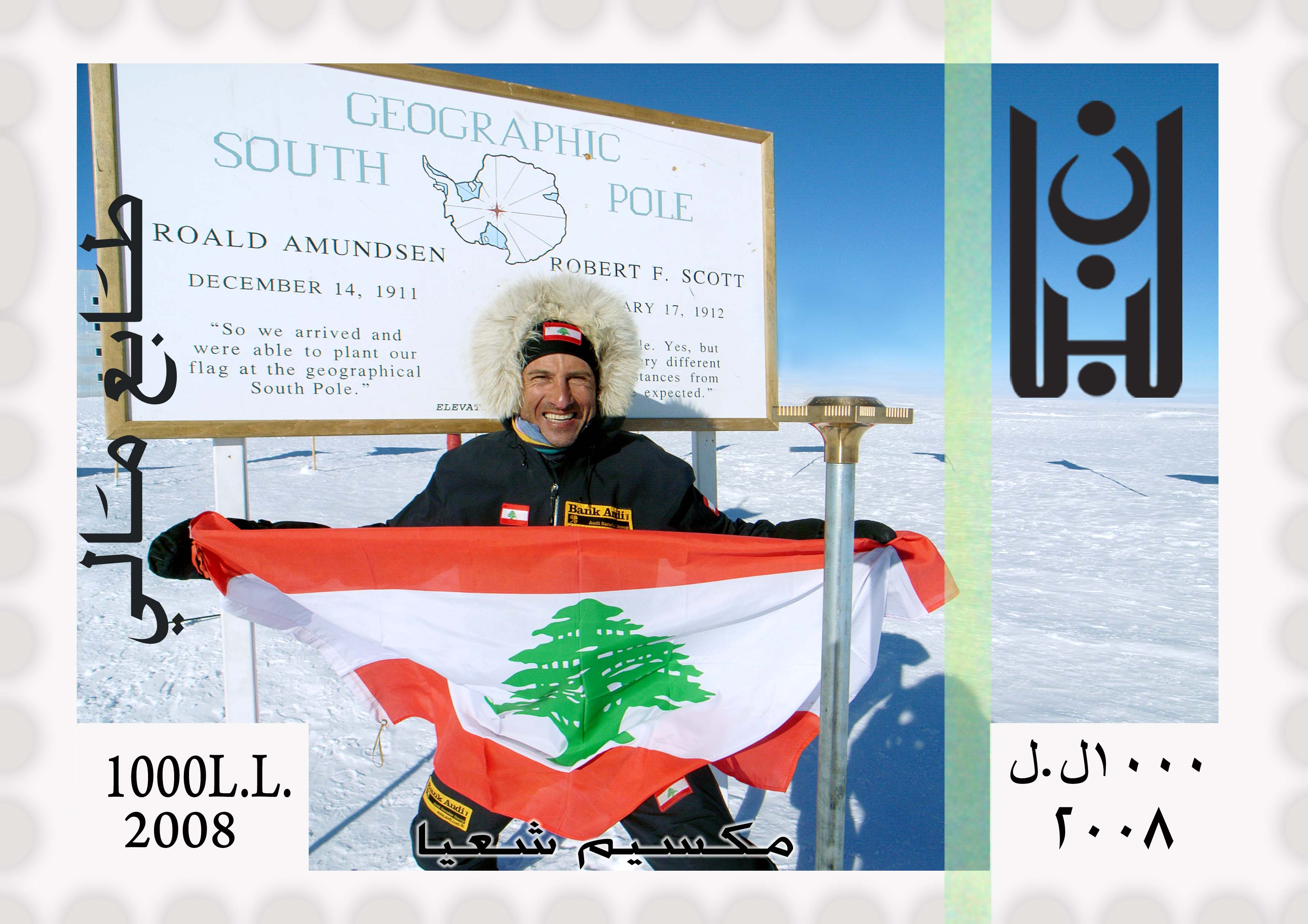
Fiscal Stamp Issued by the Lebanese Ministry of Finance commemorating Chaya's South Pole Success

- Mont Blanc (France/Italy)
- Cho Oyu (Tibet/Nepal)
- Mount Aspiring / Tititea (New Zealand)
- The Geographical North Pole (the Arctic Circle)
- The South Pole (Antarctica)
- Mount Ama Dablam (Nepal)
- The Matterhorn (Switzerland/Italy)
- Mount Kilimanjaro – 5,895m (Tanzania – September 2001)
- Mount McKinley/Denali – 6,196m (Alaska – June 2003)
- Aconcagua – 6,961m (Argentina – January 2004)
- Vinson Massif – 4,892m (Antarctica – December 2004)
- Mount Elbrus – 5,642m (Russia – July 2005)
- Carstensz Pyramid – 4,884m (Indonesia – November 2005)
- Mount Everest – 8,848m (Tibet / Nepal – May 2006)

== Public recognition ==
=== Awards and distinctions ===
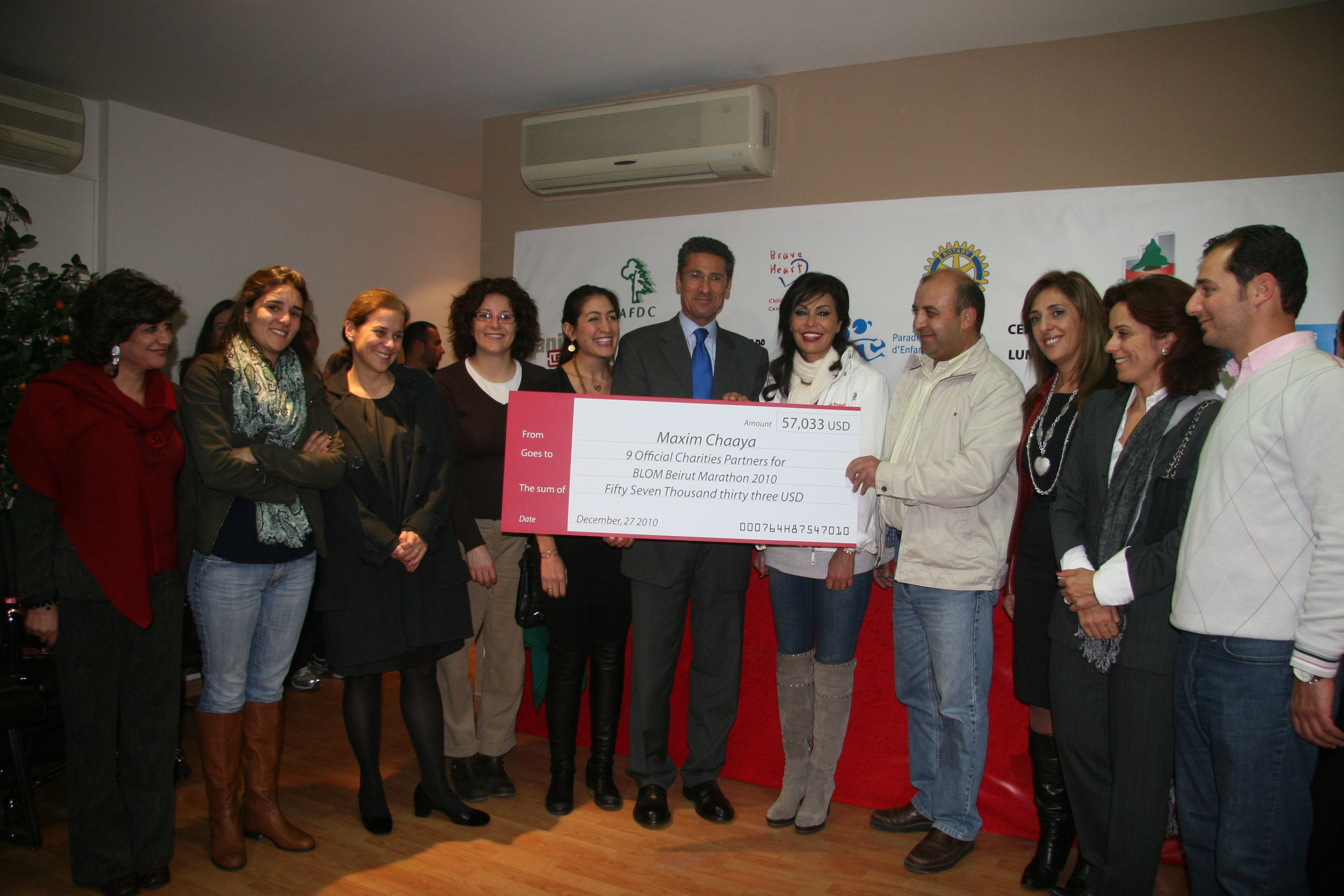
In November 2010, Chaya lead a team of seven ambassadors (Belgium, Czech Republic, Denmark, Korea, Romania, Spain and UK) to raise funds for the nine Beirut Marathon partner charities.

- December 2003: Knighted by the President of the Republic. "National Order of the Cedar" – Rank: Knight.
- May 2006: Decorated by the President of the Republic. "National Order of the Cedar" – Rank: Officer.
- May 2008: Awarded the "Paul Harris Fellowship" by the Rotary Foundation of Rotary International.

=== Stamps ===
- July 2007: Postal Stamp Issued by the Ministry of Finance commemoration Chaya's ascent of Mount Everest
- April 2008: Fiscal Stamp Issued by the Ministry of Finance commemorating Chaya's South Pole Success.

=== Calling cards ===
- March 2008: Kalam Cards (calling cards) issued by the Ministry of Telecommunications commemorating Chaya's successes. Two cards: One commemorating the Everest success on May 15, 2006; and another card commemorating the South Pole success on December 28, 2007.

== Publications ==
- Book: Steep Dreams: My journey to the Top of the World
- Comic book: Maximum Max - Vol.1: Metamorphosis on the Magic Mountain
- Comic book: Maximum Max - Vol.2: Prince of Peaks
