= Serhan Yavaş =

Turkish actor and model (born 1972)

Serhan Yavaş (born 27 March 1972) is a Turkish actor and model.

He was born in Istanbul on 27 March 1972. He entered the Sports Academy of Marmara University. He worked as a Tennis instructor and joined a modeling agency. In the year 1995, he had a small role in a soap opera called Ester ve Sarah. In the year 1998, he acted in Örümcek which was his breakthrough. He got married in 1999. In 2007 he played the character of Menderes in Yemin. In 2008 he played the character of Nuri in Yagmurdan Sonra. He has also appeared in many advertisements like Deniz Bank, Bosch, Tofaş, Papia and Nestle Kit Kat. In 2010 he played in another movie called Unutulmaz.
