= Serhan Poçan =

Turkish mountain climber

Serhan Poçan (born April 11, 1970, in Konya, Turkey) is a Turkish mountaineer and a summiteer of Mount Everest.

Serhan graduated Middle East Technical University, Ankara with a BS degree in mathematics. Currently, he is working as a software expert.

He was the leader of the first Turkish expedition to climb Mount Everest, a team of six men and four women, who all reached the summit. Serhan made the summit with five other members on the second attempt of the team on May 24, 2006.

He is married to Burçak Özoğlu, a mountaineer colleague of him, who was also on the peak of Mt. Everest along with him on the same day.
