= Russell Brice =

New Zealand mountaineer

Russell Reginald Brice (born 3 July 1952) is a New Zealand mountaineer. He was the owner/manager of Himex (Himalayan Experience Ltd.), a climbing expedition company. He has summited Cho Oyu seven times, Himal Chuli and Mount Everest twice, as well as Manaslu in October 2010, which was his 14th summit of an 8,000m peak.

== Career ==
Brice first went to Everest in 1974 as part of Edmund Hillary's Himalayan Trust. His first attempt to climb the mountain was in 1981. In 1988, Brice and Harry Taylor were the first climbers to successfully climb The Three Pinnacles on Everest's Northeast Ridge. Brice reached the summit of Everest on 29 May 1997 and again on 25 May 1998.

He is best known for leading the 2006, 2007, and 2009 expeditions on Everest which were filmed by the Discovery Channel for three seasons of a series titled Everest: Beyond the Limit. The series touts Brice's experience, weather savvy, and professionalism compared to other groups on the mountain. Following the first season, Brice became part of a controversy over the death of climber David Sharp, who was found in a weakened state high on the mountain by Brice's climbers; footage of Sharp was filmed, but he was deemed impossible to save and left to die. In the series, Brice estimates that 80% of his "mates" have died during his climbing career.

In 2012, Brice's clients each paid his company €43,000 to climb Mount Everest. Due to his concerns about dangerous conditions, Brice pulled all of his guides, clients, and Sherpas off Mount Everest, and his company's reputation was damaged due to perceptions that he was overreacting. During the 2013 season, Brice was involved in brokering an agreement between Sherpas and Western climbers after disputes broke out on the mountain.

Brice also used to own Chamonix Experience, based in Chamonix in the French Alps, and Mountain Experience, based in Nepal.

=== Films ===
Brice's expertise has been used for a number of filming projects in the Himalaya, including as location manager for the film The Wildest Dream (2010), the story of George Mallory and the expedition to locate his body which was discovered by Conrad Anker.

Brice is a central figure in the documentary Sherpa (2015), which recounts events surrounding the 2014 Mount Everest ice avalanche.

== Personal life ==
Brice is a founding member and board member of Friends of Humanity, a Geneva-based non-profit organization. In 1991, he was project co-ordinator for the 'Balloon Over Everest Expedition', successfully flying two hot air balloons over Everest.

Russell married Jennifer Norris in January 2020 in Canberra, Australia.

== Filmography ==
- The Last Ridge On Everest (1988) HTV documentary
- Ballooning Over Everest (1991)
- One Foot On Everest (1994)
- Expedition Journal (1999)
- Wild Weather (2002) BBC documentary
- Death on Everest (2003)
- After the Climb (2003)
- Everest: Beyond the Limit (2006) Season 1
- Earth: The Power of the Planet (2007) BBC production in Chamonix, Ice episode
- Everest: Beyond the Limit (2007) Season 2
- The Wildest Dream (2008)
- Everest: Beyond the Limit (2009) Season 3
- Sherpa (2015) documentary

== See also ==
- List of Mount Everest records
- List of people who died climbing Mount Everest
