= Hackett (surname) =

Hackett is a surname of Norman origin most commonly found throughout the British Isles, and the wider Anglosphere.

In the early seventeenth century, members of the Hacketts migrated to the New World, first settling in Canada, Barbados and Virginia. According to the 1990 U.S. Census, there were 17,409 Hacketts in the United States making it the 1,689th most common name in the U.S. In England there are 8,740 Hacketts making it the 904th most common surname in the country, with the name being particularly common in The Midlands. It is also quite prevalent in Australia with 3,921 Hacketts, Canada with 2,690 Hacketts and Ireland with 2,249 Hacketts making it the 396th most common surname there and is particularly common in County Tipperary.

== Origin ==
The Hackett surname originates in England. Most textbooks discussing the origin of English surnames theorize that the surname Hackett has Norman origins. The name Hacker is derived from the medieval given names Hack or Hake. These English names are derivatives of the Old Norse name Haki, which is a cognate of the English name Hook. The name Haket de Ridefort was recorded in Lincolnshire in the year 1160. The name can also be found in poll tax records in Yorkshire dating back to 1158 and the name 'Hake' is still popular in Yorkshire as well. The name was recorded in the Domesday Book of 1086 as 'Hako'. The name 'Haket' was also recorded in 1160 in Lincolnshire and the name 'Hacke' was recorded in England in 1218. Another possible origin of the name is that it derives from the Middle English word 'haket', a kind of fish. This suggests that the name could've been an occupational name for fisherman. Mabil Hacket was recorded in the Hundred Rolls in 1273.

Hackett is a common surname in the Midlands region. The village Cofton Hackett in Worcestershire is named after William de Haket, who held land there around 1166. The name is particularly common in Warwickshire ranking as the 140th most common surname in the county, as well as Staffordshire (194th), and Northamptonshire (200th). Outside of the Midlands, the name is also popular in the East of England being the 161st most common surname in Suffolk and the 250th most common surname in Cambridgeshire, as well as being popular in South East England. The name is the 149th most commons surname in East Sussex and the 208th most common name in Buckinghamshire.

Many Hacketts in Ireland were English Protestants and were prominent members of society during the Protestant Ascendancy. Several Hacketts and Hakets appear in the lists of sheriffs of Counties Tipperary and Waterford and as members of parliament for Fethard up through the sixteenth and seventeenth centuries. Notable examples include Sir Thomas Hackett who was Lord Mayor of Dublin, Thomas Hacket an Anglican bishop who was educated at Trinity College Dublin in the 1600s, Sir John Winthrop Hackett a prominent newspaper proprietor, politician and university chancellor and various Hacketts who were members of the Parliament of Ireland.

The Hackett name first migrated to Ireland at the time of the Anglo-Norman invasion in 1170. Members of the Hackett family accompanied Richard "Strongbow" de Clare, 2nd Earl of Pembroke during his invasion of Ireland. The Hacketts were subsequently granted estates in the modern counties of Kilkenny, Carlow and Kildare and thus became the principal holders of land and one of the most influential families in Ireland. As a result, several towns have taken the Hackett name, including Hacketstown, in County Carlow. Further, the Fiants of Henry VIII and Edward VI indicate that in the sixteenth century there were also Hacketstowns, or Ballyhackett, in Counties Dublin and Kildare. A branch of the Hacketts moved into Connacht, where, in due course, they became hibernicized and, like other Norman families of that province, formed a distinct if small sept which was known as MacHackett, their seat being Castle Hackett, six miles south-east of Tuam. Yet, in modern times, there has been little trace of the name Hackett in Connacht or usage of the name MacHackett in general. The Hackett name is still strong, however, in and around Counties Tipperary and Kilkenny.

Hackett may also be a variation of the Scottish surname Halkett.

== Coats of arms ==
Coat of Arms were an important sign of a noble individual in medieval Europe for recognition in times of battle or at tournaments.

An early Coat of Arms was worn by William de Hackett of Cashel in County Tipperary who founded a Franciscan Friary there in the 13th Century. His arms were three hake fish haurient in fesse and in chief three trefoils slipped proper, however the coloring is unknown.

Another Coat of Arms was granted to Sir Thomas Hackett, descended from an ancient family long settled in Ireland and Lord Mayor of Dublin in 1688. The coat of arms bore "the splendid blazon of a field gules thereon three hakes argent haurient in fesse, on a chief or three trefoils slipped proper. The crest being, out of a mural coronet argent, an eagle displayed with two heads sable, with the motto; Spec mea Deus". Translated, this reads "On a red shield are three silver hake fish (a pun on the name Hackett) on the top fourth (Chief) are three shamrocks on a gold background. A double eagle wearing a tiara perched on two snakes, while a motto reads "God is my Hope". Other mottos include "Virtue and Fidelity.", "All for now, men!" and "Fortitudine et prudentia" (With fortitude and prudence) the later believed to be from Hackett's originating in the Carlow, Kilkenny, and Wexford areas.

Most of the official coats of arms granted to individual Hacketts are a variant of the one granted to Sir Thomas Hackett.

== Variations ==
Hacket, Halket, Hackitt, Hacker, Haket, Hackert, Halkett, and Ó hAicéad are some known variations.

== Notable Hacketts ==
- A. J. Hackett, founder of a bungee jumping company in New Zealand
- Albert Hackett, American dramatist and screenwriter
- Barbara Kloka Hackett (1928–2018), American judge
- Bernard Hackett (footballer), English footballer
- Bobby Hackett (1915–1976), American jazz musician
- Bobby Hackett (swimmer), American swimmer
- Brendan Hackett, Gaelic football manager and sports psychologist
- Buddy Hackett (born Hacker), American comedian and actor
- Chelsea Hackett, Australian kickboxer
- Chris Hackett (footballer), professional footballer for Millwall
- Chris Hackett (artist), artist, engineer, and television presenter
- D. J. Hackett, American football, wide receiver for the Carolina Panthers
- Daniel Hackett Italian basketball player
- David Hackett (1926–2011), US official, during Kennedy administration
- Dave Hackett, professional skateboarder
- David Spencer Hackett, inspiration for Robert Mueller to enter military service and public service
- Des Hackett, Australian naturalist
- Earle Hackett (1921–2010), pathologist and broadcaster in Australia
- Father Jack Hackett, fictional Father Ted character
- Francis Hackett, author
- Gary Hackett, former English footballer
- Grant Hackett, Australian swimmer
- Henry Hackett, Dean of Waterford from 1903 to 1913
- Horatio Balch Hackett, biblical scholar
- Hunter Hackett, American politician
- James K. Hackett (1869–1926), American actor
- James Hackett (businessman) American Businessman Ford Motor Company
- James William Hackett, haiku poet
- Jeff Hackett, retired NHL goaltender
- Jeremy Hackett, English fashion design and co-founder of Hackett London
- Joan Hackett, American film, television and stage actress
- John Hackett (musician), flautist
- General Sir John Hackett (British Army officer), British army officer and author
- Sir John Winthrop Hackett, Australian journalist, newspaper proprietor, politician and university chancellor
- Kate Hackett, actor, producer
- Keith Hackett, former FIFA, European and English football referee
- Ken Hackett, American, president of Catholic Relief Services
- Liam Hackett (firefighter) London Fire Brigade, recipient of Life Saving Medal of the Order of St. John 1991
- Martha Hackett, American television actress
- Martin Hackett (1891–?), Irish hurler with the Dublin senior team
- Matt Hackett, National Hockey League goaltender, nephew of Jeff
- Matthew Hackett, computer graphics animator
- Michael Hackett (basketball) (born 1960), American basketball player, playing internationally
- Nathaniel Hackett, American football coach, former head coach of the Denver Broncos
- Nelson Hackett, escaped slave
- Nicole Hackett, Australian triathlete
- Norman H. Hackett, Canadian-born American actor
- O. C. Hackett, founding Supervisor, Tuscola Township, Illinois (1868); California gold rush pioneer
- Pádraigín Haicéad, Irish language poet and priest
- Patricia Hackett (1908–1963), Australian lawyer, stage actress and author, daughter of Sir Winthrop Hackett
- Paul Hackett (politician), political candidate
- Paul Hackett (American football), American football coach
- Peter Hackett (frontiersman), Boonesborough, Kentucky militiaman in the American Revolution
- Peter Hackett (mountaineer), American mountaineer and medical doctor
- Raymond Hackett (1902–1958), American actor
- Reg Hackett, English soccer footballer in the 1920s
- Richard Hackett, Mayor of Memphis, 1982–1991
- Rosalind Hackett, American historian
- Simon Hackett, South Australian internet technology entrepreneur
- Simon Hackett (academic), British academic and former social worker
- Steve Hackett, British guitarist, songwriter, and record producer
- Steven C. Hackett, American economist
- Thomas Bernard Hackett, recipient of the Victoria Cross
- William Thomas Gould Hackett, economist
- William Hackett (VC) (1873–1916), English recipient of the Victoria Cross
- William Hackett (mountaineer), American mountaineer
- Zorisha Hackett, Tobago politician
- Hackett (comics), fictional characters from DC Comics

=== Hacket ===
- John Hacket, Bishop of Lichfield
- William Hacket or Hackett, claimed to be the Messiah in London on 19 July 1591, executed for treason 12 days later

=== Hackitt ===
- Judith Hackitt, DBE, British chemical engineer and former Chair of the UK Health and Safety Executive

== See also ==
- Hackett (disambiguation)

== Sources ==
- A dictionary of English and Welsh surnames, with special American instances
- A Dictionary of English Surnames
- Surname Database
- The Oxford Dictionary of Family Names in Britain and Ireland
- Ancestry.com
- County Kilkenny Ireland Genealogy
- Hackett mottos fairnbarn 1860
