= Peter Halkett (disambiguation) =

Sir Peter Halkett, 6th Baronet (1765–1839) was a Royal Navy officer.

Peter Halkett may also refer to:

- For Peter Halkett, the boat designer, see Halkett boat
- Sir Peter Halkett, 1st Baronet (c. 1660–1746), List of members of the 1st Parliament of Great Britain, of the Halkett baronets
- Sir Peter Halkett, 2nd Baronet (1695–1755), of the Halkett baronets, MP for Stirling Burghs
- Sir Peter Halkett, 3rd Baronet (died 1792), of the Halkett baronets
- Sir Peter Arthur Halkett, 8th Baronet (1834–1904), of the Halkett baronets
