= Charles Halkett =

Charles Halkett may refer to:

- Sir Charles Halkett, 1st Baronet (d. 1697), of the Halkett baronets
- Sir Charles Halkett, 5th Baronet (1764–1837), of the Halkett baronets

== See also ==
- Halkett (surname)
