= Halkett =

Halkett (/hɔːkɛt/) is a Scottish surname of Doric English (Anglo-Norman) origin.

The Halkett surname originated in the Hawks Wood, Renfrewshire, Scotland; the family seat was at Pitfirrane Castle near Dunfermline.

The name is derived from 'hawk' /hɔːlk/ and 'head' /hi:d/ (Doric pronunciations). Being attentive to the Scots phoneme-grapheme link, the '-aw' in 'hawk' is spelt '-al' (pron. /ɔːl/), hence its morphological change from 'Haw-' to 'Hal-'. Over time, the surname evolved through auditory elision to 'head' (pron. /hi:d/) being written as '-et'/'-ett'/'-ette' (pron. /ɛt/). 'Halkett' is one such variant. By extension, surname variants ending in -head/-hede/-haide/-heid remain closer to the original 'Hawks Head' spelling than 'Halkett'.

Variants of Halkett include Halket, Halkette, Halkhead, Halkhede, Halkhaide, Halkheid and Halkheide, Hackett, Hacket, and Haket.

Notable people with the surname include:

- Alex Halkett (1881–1917), Scottish footballer
- Anne Halkett (1623–1699), English religious writer and autobiographer
- Colin Halkett (1774–1856), British army officer
- Harry Halket (1889-1935) progenitor of the Potteries market trading dynasty
- Hugh Halkett (1783–1863), British soldier
- John Halkett (disambiguation)
- Sir Peter Halkett, 6th Baronet (1765–1839), senior Royal Navy officer
- Peter Halkett (1820–1885), designer of the Halkett boat

== See also ==
- Halkett baronets
- Hackett (surname)
