= Tuscola Township =

Tuscola Township may refer to the following places in the United States:

- Tuscola Township, Douglas County, Illinois
- Tuscola Township, Tuscola County, Michigan

See also

- Tuscola (disambiguation)
