= Peter Hackett =

Peter Hackett may refer to:

- Peter Hackett (frontiersman) (ca. 1763–1828), American frontiersman
- Peter Hackett (racing driver) (born 1972), Australian motorsport racer
- Peter Hackett (mountaineer), American mountaineer and physician
