= John Halkett =

John Halkett may refer to:

- Sir John Halkett, 4th Baronet (1720–1793), of the Halkett baronets
- John Halkett (colonial administrator) (1768–1852), governor of the Bahamas and Tobago
- Sir John Halkett, 7th Baronet (1805–1847), son of Sir Peter Halkett, 6th Baronet
- John Halkett (footballer), Scottish footballer
