= Tuscola =

Tuscola may refer to:

- Tuscola, Illinois
- Tuscola Township, Douglas County, Illinois
- Tuscola, Kentucky
- Tuscola County, Michigan
- Tuscola Township, Tuscola County, Michigan
- Tuscola, Mississippi
- Tuscola High School (Waynesville, NC)
- Tuscola, Texas
