= Hacket =

Hacket is a surname. Notable people with the surname include:

- Cuthbert Hacket (died 1631), English merchant
- George Hacket (or Halket) (died 1756), Scottish poet and songwriter
- John Hacket (1592–1670), English churchman
- William Hacket (or Hackett) (died 1591), English puritan and religious fanatic

== See also ==
- Hackett (surname)
