= Franz Oppurg =

Austrian mountain climber (1948–1981)

- Born: September 17, 1948; Steinach am Brenner, Austria
- Died: March 9, 1981 (aged 32); Karwendel
- Known for: Solo climb of Mount Everest

Franz Oppurg (17 September 1948 – 9 March 1981) was an Austrian mountain climber. Having climbed from a young age, he became a mountain guide and rescuer, and performed a number of first ascents in the winter of mountains in his native Karwendel. He was also the first climber to achieve a solo ascent of Mount Everest.

== Biography ==
Oppurg was born on 17 September 1948 in Steinach am Brenner, in Tyrol. His father died at 33, when Franz was young, and the family, including a stepfather, moved to Wattens. From a young age, Oppurg was a climber. After working as a butcher, in 1975 he joined the mountain division of the army. He also trained mountaineering guides and for years led the local mountain rescue, from the Wattens section of the Austrian Alpine Club.

He made his first alpine tour when he was 16, with Toni Eliskases. With Wattens Alpine Club he climbed in the Hindu Kush in 1972, and in 1975 he went on an expedition in the Andes, to Jirishanca. In the 1970s he achieved the first winter ascents of the Lamsenspitze and other mountains in Karwendel.

In 1978, as member of an expedition led by Wolfgang Nairz, he made the first solo ascent of Mount Everest. He started at the South Col and reached the top. In 1980, he had a daughter with his girlfriend.

== Solo ascent of Mount Everest ==
Oppurg was a member of the 1978 Austrian expedition led by Wolfgang Nairz when he climbed to the summit, solo, from the South Col. He shared a tent with Josl Knoll in the last camp before the summit, but they only had one oxygen mask suitable for climbing. Knoll, the older of the two, said Oppurg should have the opportunity, so Oppurg ascended, reaching the South Summit after three hours. When he got there he discovered his oxygen was all gone, but found an unused French oxygen bottle in the snow, which allowed him to get to the top, on 14 May 1978.

Oppurg summited ten days after Reinhold Messner and Peter Habeler, members of the same expedition, reached the summit from the North side without using supplementary oxygen.

It is possible that Mick Burke, climbing solo, reached the summit of Everest via the Southwest face, as part of the 1975 British Mount Everest Southwest Face expedition led by Chris Bonington; however, Burke did not return from his attempt after a snowstorm hit the mountain. After Oppurg, Reinhold Messner was the next solo summiter; he climbed Everest alone, without oxygen, from the North side. Dr. Peter Hackett (member of the 1981 American Medical Research Expedition led by John B. West), on 24 October 1981, was the third; like Oppurg, he climbed with oxygen from the South Col to the summit.

== Death ==
On 9 March 1981, Oppurg and his longtime friend Rudi Mayr went climbing on the Hechenberg, in Karwendel. Mayr said that Oppurg, who he said had always been an elegant climber, climbed VI degree routes as if they were graded IV. They stayed at the top for a long while, and according to Mayr, Oppurg expressed doubts about his abilities, said he had no real friends, and wondered which direction to take in life. Mayr comforted him, but during the descent, while Oppurg was ahead of Mayr, Oppurg fell and died.
