= Hackett =

Hackett may refer to:

== People ==
- Hackett (surname)

== Places ==
Australia

- Hackett, Australian Capital Territory
- Hackett Terrace in Marryatville, South Australia

Canada

- Hackett River, a tributary of the Sheslay River in the Cassiar Land District of British Columbia
- Hackett (township), unincorporated territory of Lac-Masketsi, Quebec
- Lake Hackett (Mékinac), lake located in the administrative region of Mauricie

United States

- Hackett, Arkansas
- Hackett, Wisconsin

== Businesses ==
- Hackett (automobile), an American car produced 1916–1919
- Hackett London, a British men's clothing company
- Hackett Publishing Company, a book publisher based in Indianapolis, Indiana
- Hackett's Nursery (1850–?), plant nursery in Marryatville, South Australia

== Other uses ==
- R. J. Hackett, a steamship

== See also ==
- Hacket
- Hackettstown, New Jersey
