= Wolfgang Nairz =

Autrian mountain climber (born 1944)

Wolfgang Nairz (born 27 November 1944 in Kitzbühel) is an Austrian mountain climber, who did many tours in the Himalayas as an expedition leader. He was one of the first three Austrians to stand on top of Mount Everest.

== Biography ==
After being trained as a mountain and skiing guide in 1967, Nairz surveyed glaciers for ten years, and then became a teacher in the training program for mountain guides.

In 1972 he led his first expedition to the Himalayas, to the South face of Manaslu. Reinhold Messner made the first ascent of that face. In 1974 he led an unsuccessful to the South face of Makalu. Expeditions in 1974 and 1976 set new altitude records, on Noshaq, for hanggliding. In 1978 he led the first Austrian expedition to Mount Everest, and with Robert Schauer and Horst Bergmann he summited: this was the first successful Austrian ascent of the mountain. During this same expedition, Reinhold Messner and Peter Habeler climbed to the top without supplementary oxygen, and Franz Oppurg made the first solo ascent. Nairz led two expeditions to Ama Dablam (1979 and 1985). Winter expeditions in 1982 to Cho Oyu and to Dhaulagiri failed, but Messner and Hans Kammerlander were successful on Makalu in 1986. In all, Nairz traveled over 70 times to Nepal and Tibet.

== Books ==
- with Karin Kappacher: Drachenfliegen. Ein Traum wird wahr (mit Illustrationen von Johann Kappacher). Goldmann, München 1982, ISBN 978-3-442-10649-3.
- with Werner Kopacka (eds.): Gipfelsieg am Everest. Expedition der Weltrekorde des Alpenvereins 1978. Molden, München 1982, ISBN 978-3-217-00991-2.
- with Reinhold Messner and O. Bölz: Makalu-Südwand. BLV, München 1982, ISBN 978-3-405-11470-1.
- Nepal – durchwandern und erleben. Steiger, Innsbruck 1984, ISBN 978-385423-028-1.
- Tiroler Bergtouren – Bildwanderbuch mit Begleitheft. Tyrolia, Innsbruck / Wien 1984, ISBN 978-3-7022-1514-9.
- with Werner Auer: Nepal – Reise und Trekking. Steiger, Innsbruck 1993, ISBN 978-3-85423-112-7.
- with Cornelia Dittmar: Ballonfahrten. Steiger, Innsbruck 1997, ISBN 978-3-89652-073-9.
- with Karl Gabl: Innsbruck alpin. Vergangenheit, Gegenwart, Zukunft. Tyrolia, Innsbruck 2001, ISBN 978-3-7022-1912-3.
- Die wilden siebziger Jahre im Himalaya. Egoth, Wien 2008, ISBN 978-3-902480-49-1.
- with Reinhold Messner: Sturm am Manaslu: Drama auf dem Dach der Welt. Frederking & Thaler, München 2008, ISBN 978-3-89405-858-6.
