= George L. Wade =

American entertainer and racecar manufacturer (1872–1923)

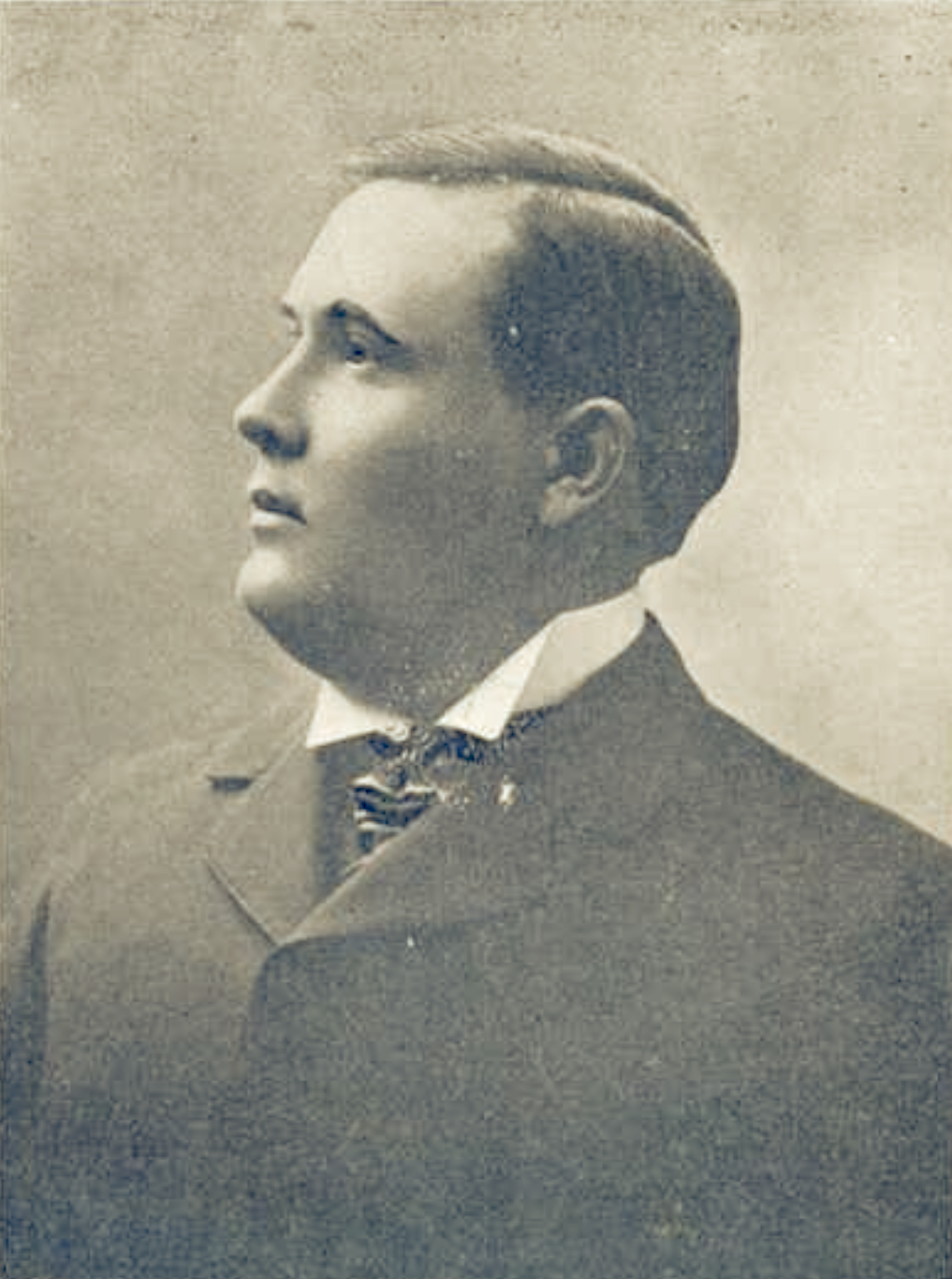
- Born: May 22, 1872; Tuscola, Illinois, U.S.
- Died: November 29, 1923 (aged 51); Beverly Hills, California, U.S.
- Occupations: entertainer racecar manufacturer electrician
- Children: 1

George Leonard Wade (May 22, 1872 – November 29, 1923) was an American entertainer, businessperson, and race car owner and constructor.

A native of Illinois, Wade began his professional life working as an electrician for the Western Electric Company. After attending the University of Illinois, he became wealthy through a variety of business ventures, including buying, restoring, and upgrading outdated or dysfunctional electric power plants. During the late 19th and early 20th century he intermittently worked as an entertainer, becoming a famous blackface comedian. With his partner Harry Ward, he led Ward and Wade's Minstrels from 1902 until 1907. In 1908 he began a career touring nationally in vaudeville. During the last six years of his life he devoted his energies to designing and building race cars; ultimately developing the Wade Special which was driven by Harlan Fengler. He was killed in 1923 after being struck by a car driven by Harry Hartz during a pre-race incident.

== Early life, education, and businessman ==
The eldest son of Isaac Newton Wade and his wife Nannie Wade (née Brian), George Leonard Wade was born on May 22, 1872, in Tuscola, Illinois. He had two younger brothers, Thomas Brian and Fred Alonzo Wade. His father worked variously as a traveling salesman, school teacher, and school superintendent.

The Wade family resided in Champaign, Illinois during George's growing up years, and he graduated from Champaign High School. In his childhood he had a strong interest in mechanical machinery and electricity, and at the age of 8 was involved in the installing of electrical lighting at the first store in Champaign to use electricity, Welshley's Shop. Seven years later he joined the staff of the Western Electric Company and was responsible for installing the first electrical wiring at Cincinnati City Hall among other high profile projects.

Wade studied at the University of Illinois, and afterwards was involved in a variety of business ventures. He found success buying electric power plants that were mechanically out of date or in disrepair, and then working to fix and upgrade their infrastructure. He bought several Pullman Cars which he then leased to land agents in Missouri and Texas for a profit. These various business ventures were interspersed with his work as an entertainer and race car manufacturer.

== Performer ==
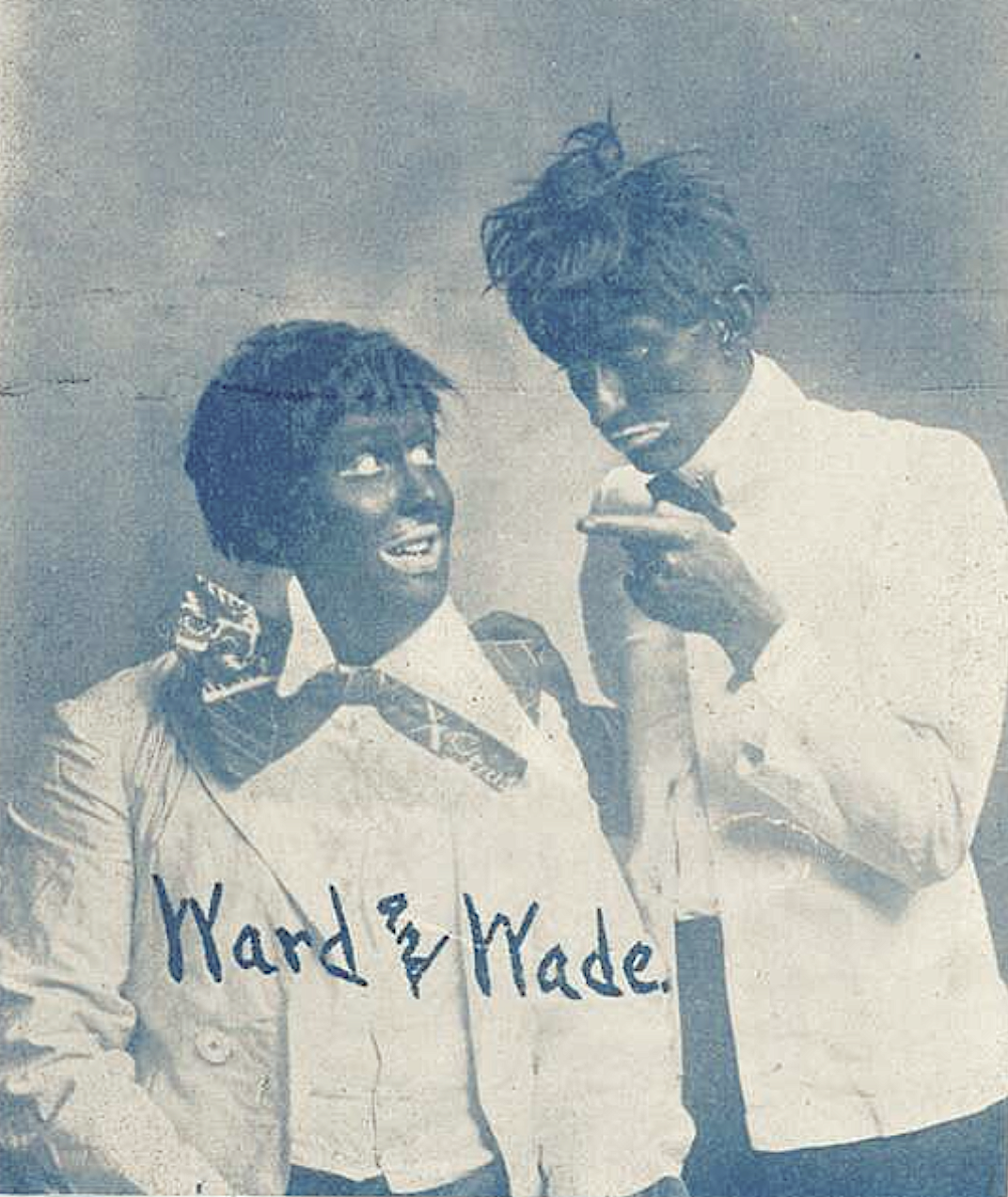
Blackface minstrelsy duo George L. Wade (left) and Harry Ward (right)

Wade began performing in minstrel shows in the late 19th century with a variety of companies, including Primrose and West, as both a singer and actor. In 1899 he performed in the Charity Minstrels in Lexington, Missouri. He became a famous blackface comedian who was known for writing original humorous material with a distinct individual style. By 1901 he was touring as a headliner in Harry Ward's Magnificent Minstrels. In 1902 he became an official partner in Ward's enterprise, and it was re-named Wade and Ward's Minstrels. The pair formed a successful partnership which lasted until 1907 when the duo went their separate ways, each taking half of the company to what one reviewer considered detrimental to the enterprise.

Following the demise of Wade and Ward's Minstrels, Wade began appearing in vaudeville in 1908. He appeared in leading vaudeville theaters nationally. In 1910 he headlined Chicago's Star Theatre in the variety act George L. Wade and Company. In 1915 he toured as leading performer in Rice and Quick's Sunflower Minstrels.

== Race car manufacturer and death ==
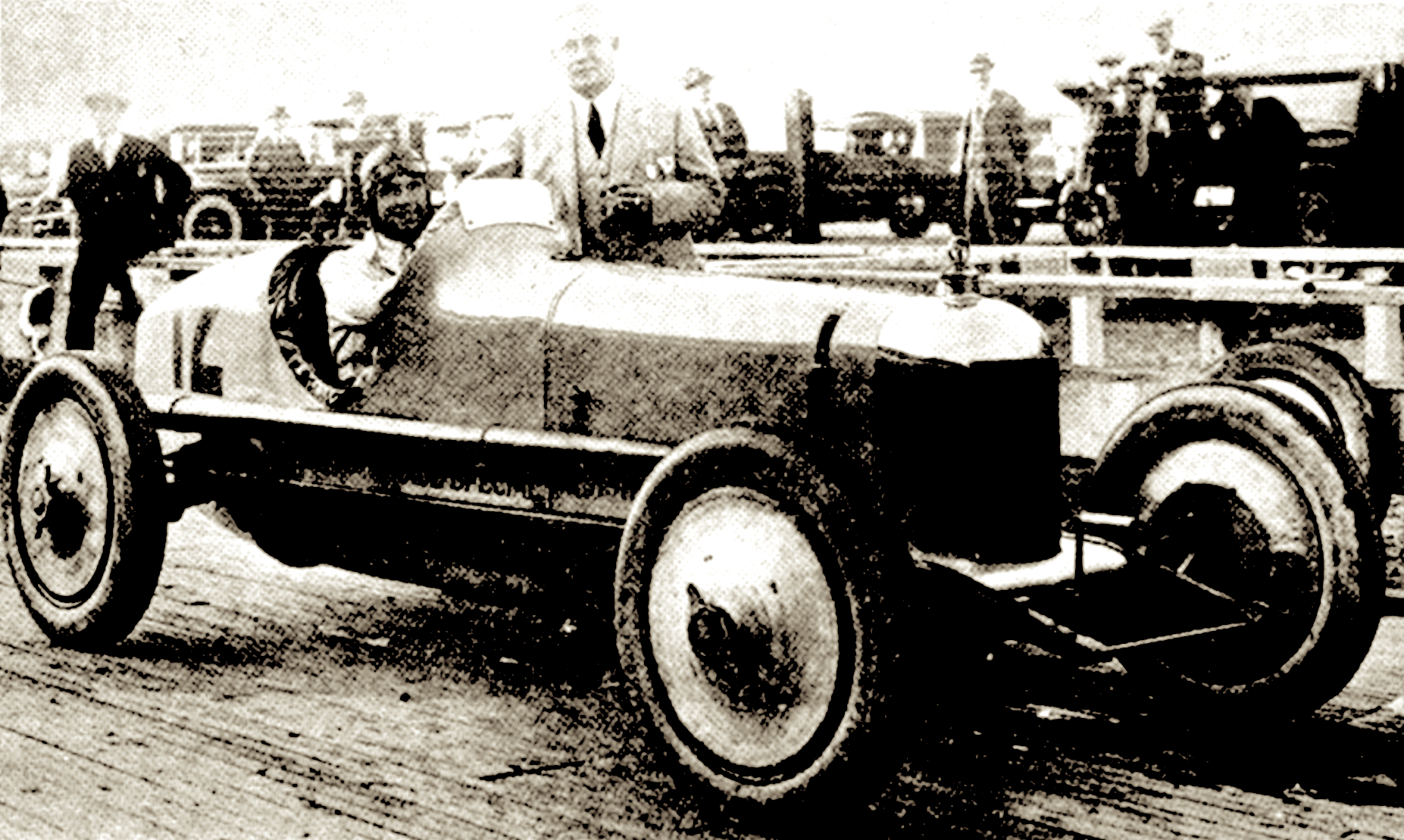
Harlan Fengler sitting in the Wade Special with George L. Wade standing behind the vehicle.

Wade's business ventures had made him wealthy, and in c. 1917 he began to pursue a passion for building racecars with the stated goal of building the world's fastest car. He spent a portion of his wealth on researching, designing, and building racecars during the last six years of his life. He was the owner and manufacturer of the Wade Special race car which was driven by Harlan Fengler. Wade incorporated the shape of an eagle's beak into the Wade Special's design, and Farlan won a high profile 250-mile (400 km) race at Kansas City, Missouri, in October 1923 before Wade's death the following month.

George L. Wade was killed on Thanksgiving Day 1923 in Beverly Hills, California, after being struck by a race car being driven by Harry Hartz. A photographer was also killed in the accident, which occurred during a warm-up prior to a scheduled race. Wade died at a hospital approximately 30 minutes after the incident. Wade's $400,000 estate was given to his adopted son George L. Wade Jr. in his will, which was created on November 21.
