= Battle of Little Mountain =

Battle in the American Revolutionary War in the Kentucky frontier

- Part of the American Revolutionary War
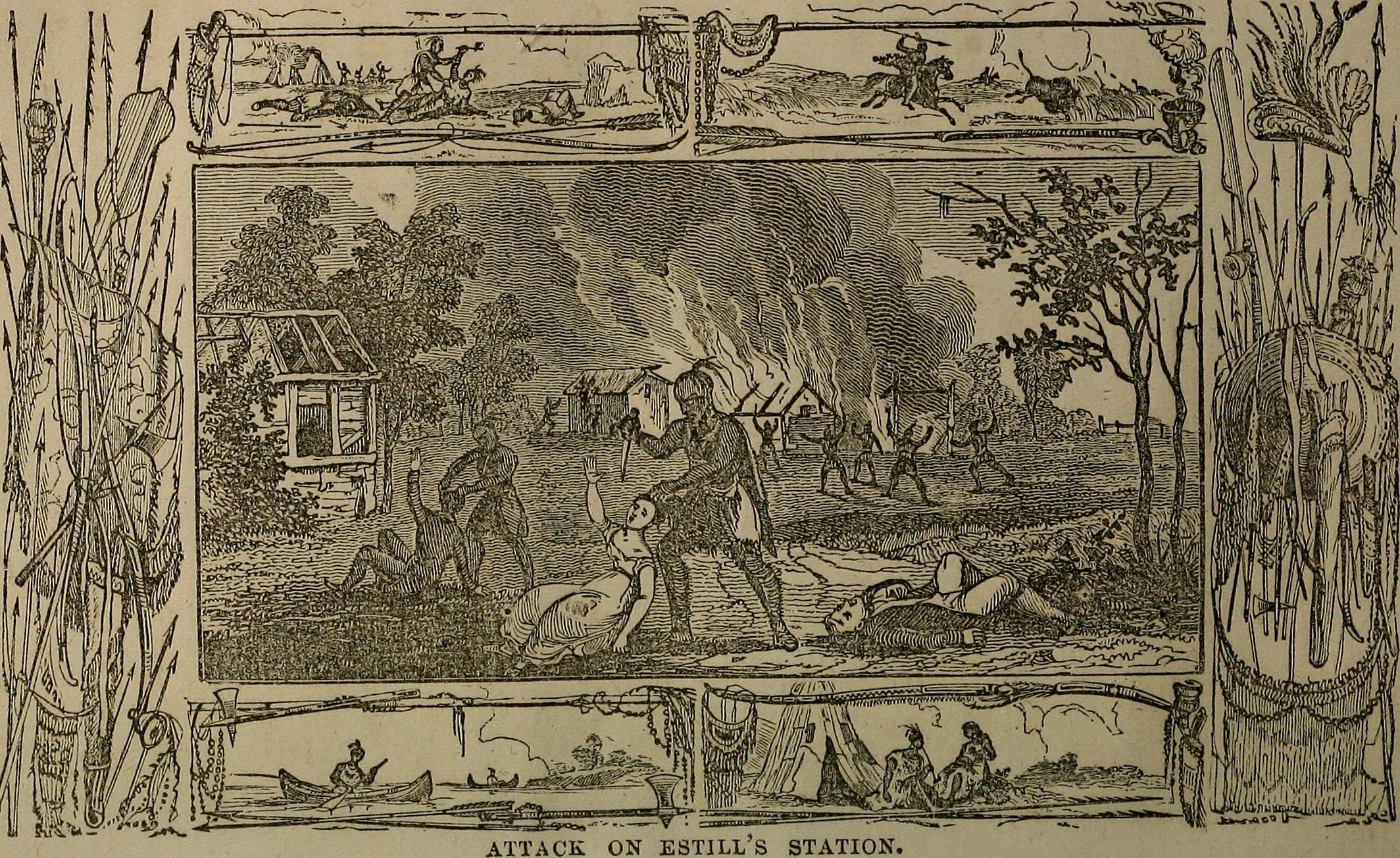
- Illustration of the battle
Date	March 22, 1782
Location	near Mount Sterling, Kentucky
Result	Wyandot victory

Belligerents
Wyandot	United States

Commanders and leaders
Sourehoowah †	James Estill †

Strength
Unknown	25 militia

Casualties and losses
17 killed 2 wounded	7 killed 6 wounded

The Battle of Little Mountain, also known as Estill's Defeat, was fought on March 22, 1782, near Mount Sterling in what is now Montgomery County, Kentucky. One of the bloodiest engagements of the Kentucky frontier, the battle has long been the subject of controversy resulting from the actions of one of Captain James Estill's officers, William Miller, who ordered a retreat that left the rest of Estill's command to be overwhelmed by the attacking Wyandots.

== Background ==
On March 19, 1782, Captain James Estill received a message from Colonel Benjamin Logan requesting assistance after signs of a Wyandot war party had been seen near Boonesborough, in addition to empty canoes having been seen floating down the Kentucky River. Gathering about 40 men from nearby settlements, Estill began searching the area. While he was away, the Wyandots attacked a number of nearby settlements, including Estill's Station, killing 14-year-old Jennie Glass and capturing Munk Estill, a slave who belonged to James Estill.

Under interrogation, Munk was able to persuade the Wyandots to hold off their attack, convincing them that Estill's Station was at full strength. (In reality, with the exception of one man on the sick list, only women and children were present at the fort.) After killing a number of cattle, the Wyandots fled across the river. As soon as the Indians retreated, Samuel South and Peter Hackett, both young men, were dispatched to find Captain Estill and inform him of the attacks. They found Estill near the mouth of Drowning Creek and Red River on the morning of March 21.

About half of Estill's 40 men had left families at the fort. They returned to Estill's Station that same day and Estill soon returned with the rest. He ordered five men to remain at Estill's Station and led the others in pursuit of the Indian raiding party. He set up camp at Little Mountain, near present-day Mt. Sterling. Resuming the chase the next morning, Estill was forced to leave behind 10 more men whose horses were too tired to continue. Finding fresh tracks, Estill and the 25 men remaining soon overtook the Wyandots at Little Mountain Creek.

== Battle ==
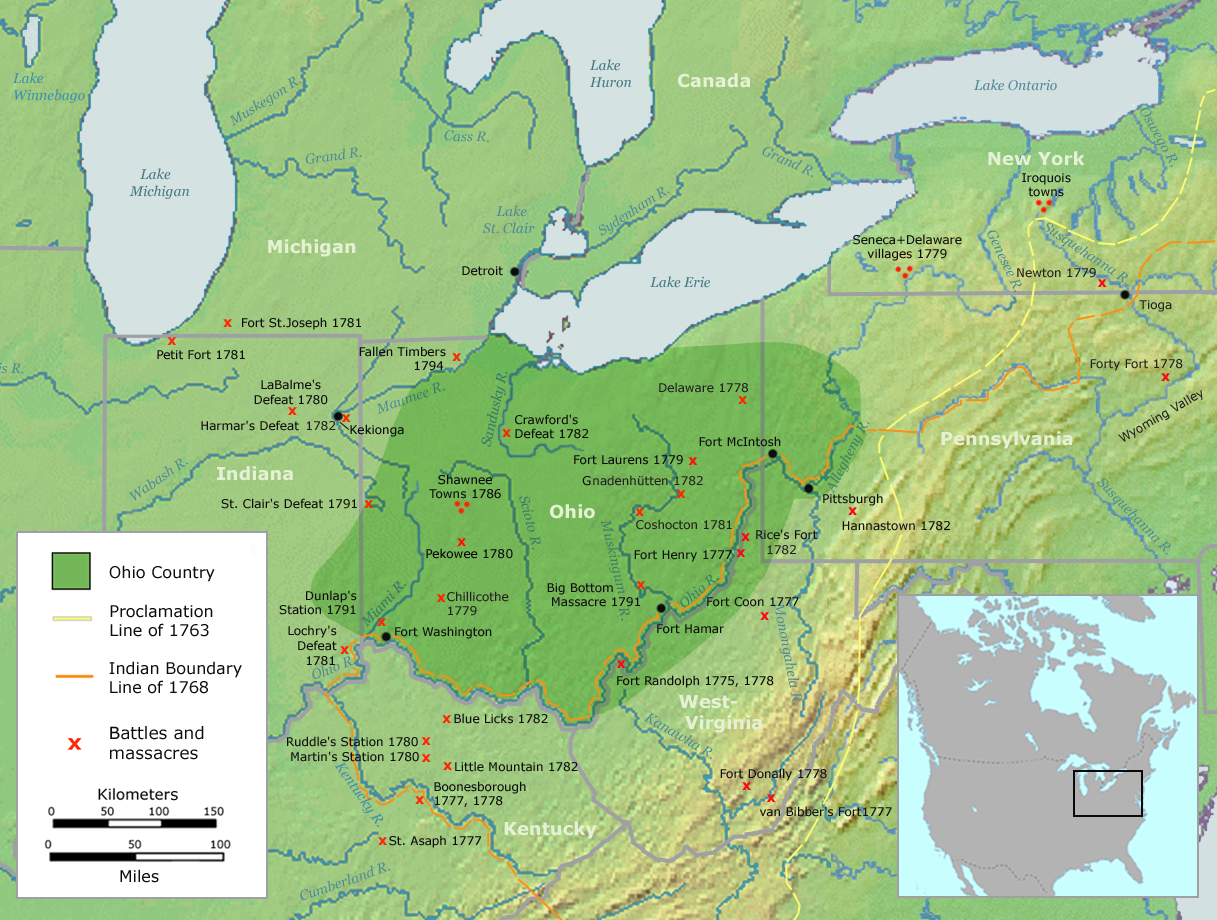
Location of battle (center, near bottom)

On the night of March 22, 1782, Estill and his militiamen encountered the Wyandot raiding party. Separated by Little Mountain Creek, they were a mile and a half north of Little Mountain. The two sides fought in a violent, pitched battle for nearly two hours. The Wyandot leader, Sourehoowah, was reportedly shot by the first volley and urged his men to continue fighting as he lay dying. After firing at each other across the creek for some time, both sides had suffered heavy casualties. When the Wyandots began fording Little Mountain Creek, Estill countered by dividing his forces into three groups. Estill took the right flank, the left being given to Lieutenant William Miller, while Ensign David Cook held the center.

Miller was ordered to flank the rear of the Wyandots from the left. As he prepared to lead his men into battle, a musket ball apparently hit his rifle, knocking the flint from the jaws of the lock. Miller allegedly shouted that "it was foolhardy to stay and be shot down," so he fled the scene with his men following him. With Estill's left flank now open and the creek defended by only four men, the Wyandots easily rushed in, killing Estill and six others as the militiamen retreated. Estill had already been wounded three times. As he attempted to escape with his men, he was killed in hand-to-hand combat by a pursuing Wyandot warrior. Militiaman Joseph Proctor witnessed Estill's death and shot the attacker dead with his rifle.

Only a handful of men were left on each side, and the battle ended with the Kentuckians withdrawing from the field. Those Kentuckians who had been captured reported later that the Wyandots had suffered about 20 casualties. Monk Estill, who had escaped during the battle, reported that 17 Wyandots had been killed and two more wounded. This was confirmed by another prisoner who later escaped. Among the 18 Kentuckians who survived the battle at Little Mountain were frontiersman James Anderson, Reuben Proctor, David Lynch, and William Irving. Adam Caperton, the father of United States Congressman Hugh Caperton, was killed.

== Aftermath ==
William Miller became the scapegoat for both the Kentuckians' defeat and the death of Captain Estill. One of the survivors, David Cook, reportedly threatened his life 20 years after the battle. Miller never returned to Estill's Station to defend himself against his accusers. Monk Estill won particular distinction for bravery during the battle, having carried a wounded militiaman, James Berry, almost 25 miles (40 km) back to Estill's Station. He was granted his freedom soon afterwards by Wallace Estill, becoming the first slave to be freed in Kentucky. The traditional site of Estill's death is marked by a millstone marker pointing to an old sycamore tree on Hinkston Creek. In 1808 Estill County, Kentucky, was named for Captain James Estill.

== See also ==
- List of battles fought in Kentucky
