= Stephen Hackett (hurler) =

Irish hurler

Personal information
- Native name: Stíofán Haicéid (Irish)
- Born: 26 December 1891 Toomevara, County Tipperary, Ireland
- Died: 10 January 1969 (aged 77) Thurles, County Tipperary, Ireland
- Occupation: Farmer

Sport
- Sport: Hurling
- Position: Centre-back
Club
- Years: Club
- Toomevara
Club titles
- Tipperary titles: 8
Inter-county
- Years: County
- 1913-1932: Tipperary
Inter-county titles
- Munster titles: 3
- All-Irelands: 1
- NHL: 0

Stephen Hackett (26 December 1891 – 10 January 1969) was an Irish hurler who played as a centre-back for the Tipperary senior team.

Hackett made his first appearance for the team during the 1913 championship and was a regular member of the starting fifteen at various times until his retirement after the 1932 championship. During that time, he won one All-Ireland medal and three Munster medals.

At club level, Hackett was a multiple county championship medalist with Toomevara.

His brother, Martin Hackett, was an All-Ireland winner with Dublin.
