= Tuscola Airport =

- IATA: none; ICAO: none; FAA LID: K96

Summary
- Airport type: Public
- Owner: Tuscola Airport Improvement Ltd.
- Serves: Tuscola, Illinois
- Time zone: UTC−06:00 (-6)
  - Summer (DST): UTC−05:00 (-5)
- Elevation AMSL: 665 ft / 203 m
- Coordinates: 39°46′51″N 088°18′22″W

Map
- Location of airport in Illinois K96 (the United States)

Runways
Direction	Length		Surface
Direction	ft	m	Surface
9/27	2,660	811	Paved

Statistics (2019)
- Aircraft operations: 8,700
- Source: Federal Aviation Administration

Tuscola Airport (FAA LID: K96) is a privately owned public use airport located two nautical miles (3.7 km) southwest of the central business district of Tuscola, a city in Douglas County, Illinois, United States.

The airport is a major base for crop-dusting aircraft in the area to support farms growing corn, soybeans, and other crops. The airport is home to an Illinois branch of Atlantic Ag Aviation. The airport received an EPA-approved chemical loading site in 2010 after being bought by its current owner.

== Facilities and aircraft ==
Tuscola Airport covers an area of 12 acres (4.9 ha) at an elevation of 665 feet (203 m) above mean sea level. It has one runway designated 9/27 with a gravel surface measuring 2,660 by 30 feet (811 x 9 m).

For the 12-month period ending May 31, 2022, the airport had 8,700 aircraft operations, an average of 23 per day, all general aviation. No aircraft were based at the field at the time.

== Accidents and incidents ==
- On October 20, 2008, a Howard Super Sky Raider crashed while taking off from Tuscola Airport. During the takeoff roll, the aircraft started to "angle to the right." The pilot applied hard left rudder pedal, but the airplane continued to turn right and went off the right side of the 30-foot wide runway, and traveled about 35 feet into a cornfield. The probable cause of the accident was found to be the pilot's failure to maintain control during the takeoff roll.
- On July 15, 2009, a Beechcraft S35 Bonanza overrran the runway while landing at Tuscola Airport. The pilot’s first attempt to land resulted in a go-around because the airplane was too high and fast. During the second landing attempt, the airplane bounced and the pilot did another go-around. The plane was still too fast on the third attempt and touched down 1/3 or 1/2 way down the runway. The pilot applied the brakes, but the airplane went off the end of the runway. The pilot made a sharp left turn to avoid hitting a ditch head-on. The right main landing gear and nose gear collapsed, and the right wing came to rest on the road. The probable cause of the accident was found to be the pilot's failure to maintain proper speed and distance during approach, which resulted in landing long and subsequent runway excursion.

== See also ==
- List of airports in Illinois
