= William Thomas Gould Hackett =

Canadian economist (1906–1983)

William Thomas Gould Hackett (30 May 1906 – 16 July 1983) was a Canadian economist and an economic adviser for the Bank of Montreal. During World War II he was secretary of the Wartime Industries Control Board.

Born in Carbonear, Newfoundland on 30 May 1906, he was baptized on 23 July 1906. He was educated at Guelph Collegiate, Ontario, and attended the University of Toronto. He married Alice Diretta Scroogie on 1 July 1936.

Hackett was author of the 1945 book, A Background of Banking Theory.

He served as an economic adviser at the Bank of Montreal from 1943 to 1952. Other positions at the bank included:

- Assistant General Manager, 1952–1954
- Assistant General Manager, Securities Department, 1955–1959
- Assistant General Manager, Special Senior Executive Duties, 1959–1963
- Deputy General Manager Investments, 1964–1965
- General Manager Investments, 1966–?.

Lecturer in Money & Banking Sir George Williams University 1970–1971 President, University Club of Montreal 1970–1971

During World War II, Hackett was Secretary, Ontario Executive Committee, National War Finance Committee (1941), and Secretary, Wartime Industries Control Board, Ottawa (1941-1943). He died at a Montreal nursing home in 1983.
