= Tuscola, Illinois =

- City
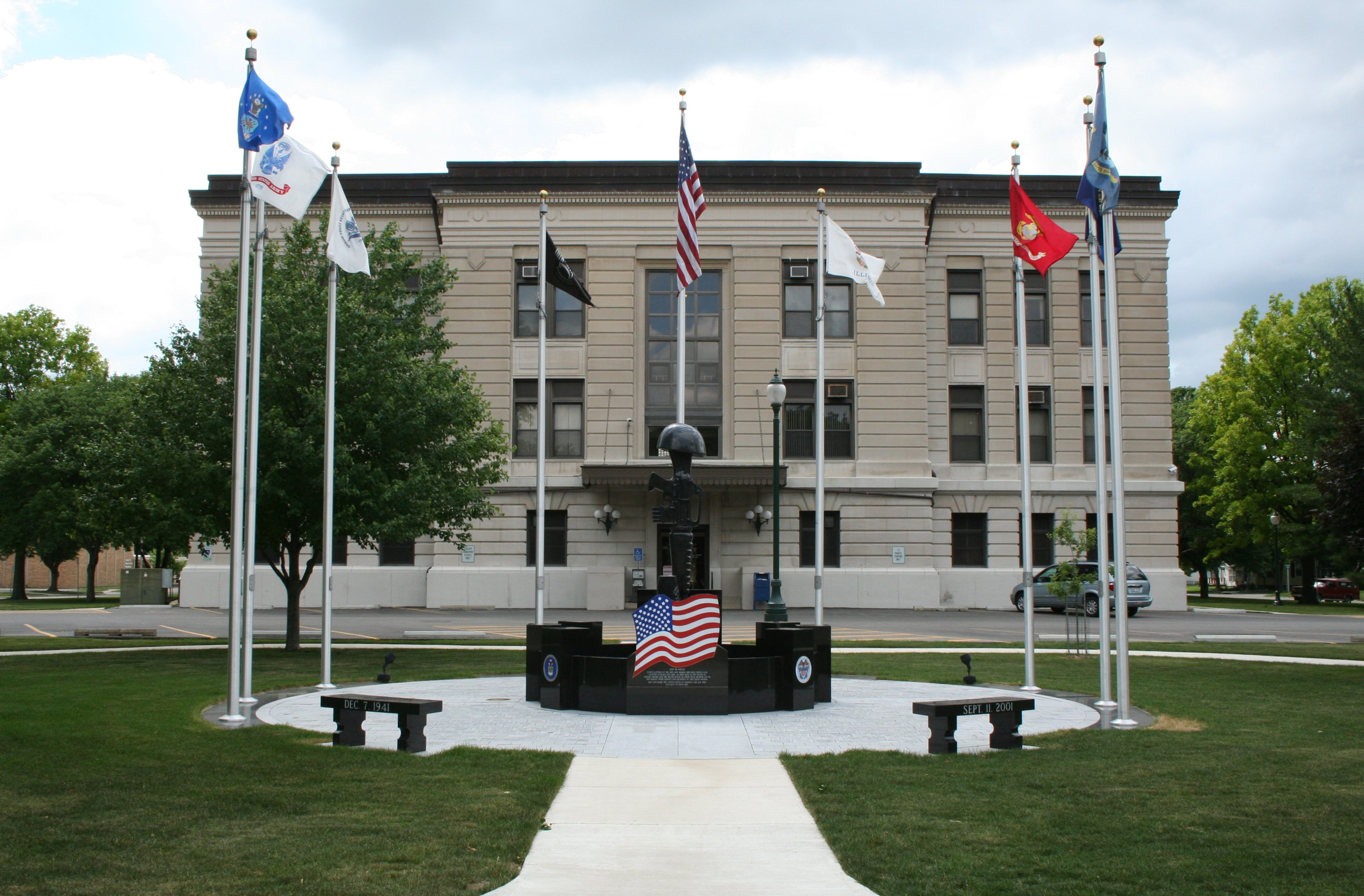
- Douglas County Courthouse in Tuscola
- Motto: "A Complete Community"
- Interactive map of Tuscola, Illinois
- Location within Illinois Location within the United States
- Coordinates: 39°47′48″N 88°16′30″W
- Country: United States
- State: Illinois
- County: Douglas
- Township: Tuscola

Government
  - Type: City
  - Mayor: Daniel Kleiss

Area
  - Total: 2.96 sq mi (7.66 km^{2})
  - Land: 2.95 sq mi (7.64 km^{2})
  - Water: 0.012 sq mi (0.03 km^{2})
- Elevation: 646 ft (197 m)

Population (2024)
  - Total: 4,636
  - Density: 1,571.9/sq mi (606.92/km^{2})
- Time zone: UTC-6 (CST)
  - Summer (DST): UTC-5 (CDT)
- ZIP code: 61953
- Area code: 217
- FIPS code: 17-76407
- GNIS ID: 2397071
- Website: tuscola.org/home

Tuscola is the largest city and the county seat of Douglas County, Illinois, United States. The population was 4,636 at the 2020 census.

== History ==
The city of Tuscola's name came from an unknown Native American tribe's word for "flat plain."

The founding Supervisor of Tuscola township was O. C. Hackett, who was elected in 1868. Hackett was elected Supervisor with a majority of only one vote over W. B. Ervin. O. C. Hackett was the grandson of noted Kentucky frontiersman and Boonsborough resident Peter Hackett. O. C. planted Hackett's Grove, a sassafras grove situated on Section 31, Township 16, Range 9, on the east side of the township. This 20-acre (81,000 m^{2}) grove is traversed by a branch of Scattering Fork of the Embarrass River, long known as Hackett's Run. According to the History of Douglas County (1884), the grove had been owned by the Hacketts long before Douglas County came into existence. O.C. Hackett's father, John Hackett, settled in nearby Coles County in 1835. Family legend holds that Abraham Lincoln stayed at the Hackett farm during the Lincoln-Douglas debates of 1858.

From the 1890s to the 1940s, Tuscola had a sizeable number of African-American citizens, including Arthur Anderson, the "most graceful walker" at the 1898 Colored Folks Cake Walk in Tuscola; his partner Cozy Chavous; the musician Cecil "Pete" Bridgewater, father of internationally known musicians Cecil Bridgewater and Ronnie Bridgewater; the educator and musician Ruth Calimese, daughter of automobile worker "Big Jim" Calimese; musician Solomon "Sol" Chavous; mail carrier and war veteran Bruce Hayden (father of distinguished violinist Bruce Hayden Jr.); Lemuel and Nettie Riley; football star and garage owner Tommy Wright; and dozens of other people. Tuscola had two churches with mainly black congregations, the African Methodist Episcopal Church on North Niles, and the White Horse Riders church on Houghton Street. Unlike the neighboring town of Arcola, Tuscola did not have the ordinance, common in small Illinois towns at the time, that an African-American person could not be on the streets after sundown. The black and white people of Tuscola got along well. However, between 1922 and 1924 two large Ku Klux Klan gatherings were held in Tuscola. The 1924 rally consisted of nearly 2,000 Klan cars, a hundred marching Klansmen, burning crosses, and a naturalization ceremony in Tuscola's Ervin Park.

== Geography ==
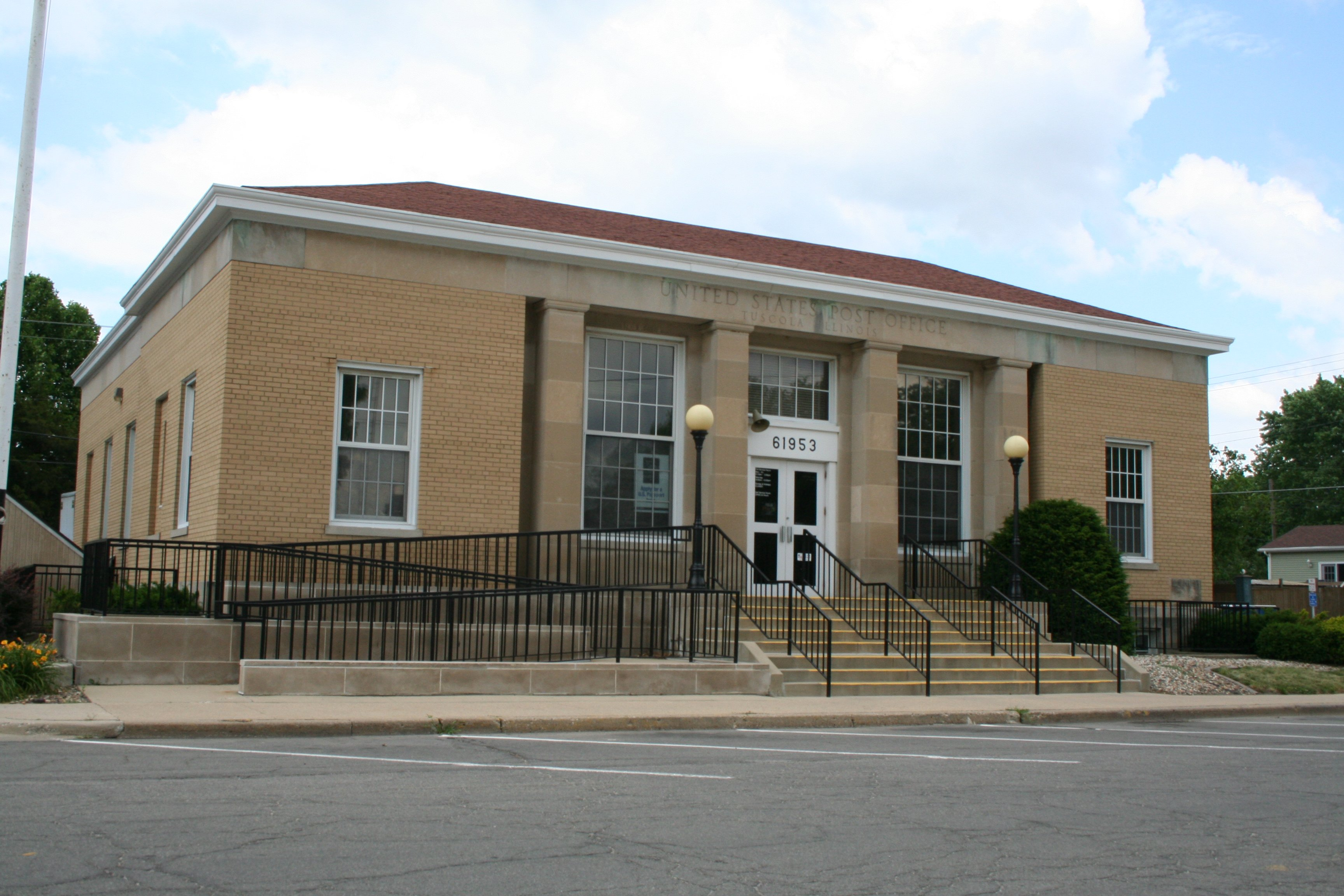
Tuscola, Illinois, post office

According to the 2021 census gazetteer files, Tuscola has a total area of 2.96 square miles (7.67 km^{2}), of which 2.95 square miles (7.64 km^{2}) (or 99.66%) is land and 0.01 square miles (0.03 km^{2}) (or 0.34%) is water.

=== Climate ===
Climate data for Tuscola, Illinois (1991–2020 normals, extremes 1893–present)
Month	Jan	Feb	Mar	Apr	May	Jun	Jul	Aug	Sep	Oct	Nov	Dec	Year
Record high °F (°C)	73 (23)	73 (23)	87 (31)	92 (33)	98 (37)	105 (41)	113 (45)	104 (40)	103 (39)	93 (34)	82 (28)	71 (22)	113 (45)
Mean daily maximum °F (°C)	34.0 (1.1)	38.9 (3.8)	50.3 (10.2)	63.5 (17.5)	73.8 (23.2)	82.4 (28.0)	84.9 (29.4)	84.0 (28.9)	78.8 (26.0)	66.2 (19.0)	51.2 (10.7)	39.1 (3.9)	62.3 (16.8)
Daily mean °F (°C)	26.0 (−3.3)	30.0 (−1.1)	40.5 (4.7)	52.5 (11.4)	63.6 (17.6)	72.6 (22.6)	75.1 (23.9)	73.5 (23.1)	66.9 (19.4)	54.8 (12.7)	41.8 (5.4)	31.4 (−0.3)	52.4 (11.3)
Mean daily minimum °F (°C)	18.0 (−7.8)	21.0 (−6.1)	30.6 (−0.8)	41.5 (5.3)	53.4 (11.9)	62.8 (17.1)	65.4 (18.6)	63.0 (17.2)	55.1 (12.8)	43.4 (6.3)	32.4 (0.2)	23.7 (−4.6)	42.5 (5.8)
Record low °F (°C)	−25 (−32)	−23 (−31)	−10 (−23)	15 (−9)	26 (−3)	34 (1)	44 (7)	41 (5)	21 (−6)	18 (−8)	−7 (−22)	−26 (−32)	−26 (−32)
Average precipitation inches (mm)	2.44 (62)	2.07 (53)	2.87 (73)	4.52 (115)	4.24 (108)	4.84 (123)	4.38 (111)	2.97 (75)	3.07 (78)	3.25 (83)	3.37 (86)	2.53 (64)	40.55 (1,030)
Average snowfall inches (cm)	5.0 (13)	4.9 (12)	2.2 (5.6)	0.2 (0.51)	0.0 (0.0)	0.0 (0.0)	0.0 (0.0)	0.0 (0.0)	0.0 (0.0)	0.0 (0.0)	0.9 (2.3)	3.7 (9.4)	16.9 (43)
Average precipitation days (≥ 0.01 in)	8.3	7.9	9.3	11.0	11.8	10.4	8.8	7.4	7.4	8.9	8.8	8.9	108.9
Average snowy days (≥ 0.1 in)	3.1	3.3	1.1	0.1	0.0	0.0	0.0	0.0	0.0	0.0	0.6	2.7	10.9
Source: NOAA

== Demographics ==
Historical population
Census	Pop.	Note	%±
1880	1,457		—
1890	1,897		30.2%
1900	2,569		35.4%
1910	2,453		−4.5%
1920	2,564		4.5%
1930	2,569		0.2%
1940	2,838		10.5%
1950	2,960		4.3%
1960	3,875		30.9%
1970	3,917		1.1%
1980	3,839		−2.0%
1990	4,155		8.2%
2000	4,448		7.1%
2010	4,480		0.7%
2020	4,636		3.5%
U.S. Decennial Census

=== 2020 census ===
As of the 2020 census, Tuscola had a population of 4,636. There were 1,157 families residing in the city. The population density was 1,566.75 inhabitants per square mile (604.93/km^{2}).

The median age was 38.8 years. 23.9% of residents were under the age of 18 and 17.4% of residents were 65 years of age or older. For every 100 females there were 93.4 males, and for every 100 females age 18 and over there were 89.3 males age 18 and over. 99.7% of residents lived in urban areas, while 0.3% lived in rural areas.

There were 1,973 households in Tuscola, of which 29.8% had children under the age of 18 living in them. Of all households, 46.0% were married-couple households, 17.7% were households with a male householder and no spouse or partner present, and 29.0% were households with a female householder and no spouse or partner present. About 32.3% of all households were made up of individuals and 15.2% had someone living alone who was 65 years of age or older.

There were 2,218 housing units at an average density of 749.58 per square mile (289.41/km^{2}), of which 11.0% were vacant. The homeowner vacancy rate was 2.6% and the rental vacancy rate was 9.5%.

Racial composition as of the 2020 census
Race	Number	Percent
White	4,264	92.0%
Black or African American	26	0.6%
American Indian and Alaska Native	8	0.2%
Asian	55	1.2%
Native Hawaiian and Other Pacific Islander	0	0.0%
Some other race	76	1.6%
Two or more races	207	4.5%
Hispanic or Latino (of any race)	155	3.3%

=== Income and poverty ===
The median income for a household in the city was $65,827, and the median income for a family was $88,309. Males had a median income of $52,143 versus $26,309 for females. The per capita income for the city was $33,316. About 10.3% of families and 11.5% of the population were below the poverty line, including 18.5% of those under age 18 and 8.3% of those age 65 or over.

== Education ==
Tuscola is home to Tuscola Community Unit School District 301 which includes:

- North Ward Elementary School (PreK-4th)
- East Prairie Middle School (5th-8th)
- Tuscola Community High School (9th-12th)

== Parks and recreation ==
Tuscola is home to two parks.

- Ervin Park
- Wimple Park

== Infrastructure ==
=== Highways ===
- U.S. Route 36
- U.S. Route 45
- Interstate 57

==== Airport ====
Tuscola is served by the Tuscola Airport, which is approximately 2 miles (3.2 km) southwest of Tuscola.

==== Transit ====
Dial-A-Ride Public Transportation provides dial-a-ride bus transit service to the city.

==== Rail ====
Tuscola, has extensive railway service provided by several major railroads that intersect in the area, including Union Pacific Railroad, CSX Transportation, and Canadian National Railway. The Decatur & Eastern Illinois Railroad (DREI), a subsidiary of Watco, also operates in Tuscola and is an important rail link for various commodities, with connections to Union Pacific. While Tuscola does not have its own passenger rail station, the nearest Amtrak service is available in nearby Mattoon or Champaign.

=== Healthcare ===
Tuscola is served by three walk-in clinics: Carle Tuscola, SBL Tuscola (Sarah Bush Lincoln), and Christie Clinic. Each of these providers has a hospital located within 30 miles of Tuscola.

== Notable people ==
- Helen Bertram, actress
- Marianne Boruch, author
- Bradford Brinton, manufacturer
- Smiley Burnette, actor
- Fred E. Busbey, politician
- James E. Callaway, politician
- Llewellyn L. Callaway, politician
- John H. Campbell, jurist
- Joseph Gurney Cannon, longtime Speaker of the US House
- Philip F. Deaver, author
- Gary Forrester, author
- Danny Lee Fread, engineer
- Jennie Garth, actress
- Walt Hackett, football coach
- O. C. Hackett, pioneer
- Linda Metheny, Olympic gymnast
- William W. Parsons, academic administrator
- Jim Reeder, football player
- Gertrude Sawyer, architect
- George L. Wade, Entertainer, American Racecar Manufacturer
- Fred Wakefield, NFL football player
- Jean Waters, 1975 Miss Illinois
- David Wolfenberger, singer
