= George Halket =

Scottish poet and songwriter

George Halket or Hacket (died 1756), was a Scottish poet and songwriter.

Halket is said by Peter Buchan ("Gleanings of Scotch, English, and Irish Old Ballads") to have been a native of Aberdeenshire. In 1714 he was appointed schoolmaster, precentor, and session-clerk in the parish of Rathen, Aberdeenshire. One apartment served for dwelling and schoolhouse, and when, in 1718, Halket married Janet Adamson, the heritors being severely economical caused his box-bed to be reversed, so that its back should be a partition between school and bedroom, while they let a window into the north wall to insure the comfort of the sleepers. Halket's unsteady habits led to his dismissal from Rathen in 1725, and with his wife and three children he settled at Cairnbulg, some distance off, and was a more or less successful schoolmaster there for twenty-five years. In 1750 he removed to Memsie, becoming tutor in the families of Colonel Fraser and Sir James Innes, besides doing other private teaching. His last change was to Tyrie, where he died in 1756. According to Buchan, he is buried in Fraserburgh old churchyard.

Halket's only undoubted publication is a thin 12mo volume, entitled "Occasional Poems upon Several Subjects", printed at Aberdeen in 1727 for the author, who figures on the title-page as 'George Hacket.' There are four poems in the work: 'Advice to Youth,' based on Ecclesiastes, xii. 1–2; 'Good Friday,' in which the author illustrates one part of his theme with severe references to the treatment of Charles I by Scottish and English whigs; 'Easter Day;' and an insipid 'Pastoral.' The volume containing these poems is extremely rare and was unknown to Buchan. Perhaps the only existing copy is in the Mitchell Library, Glasgow. It has not much value as literature, nothing in it approaching the rapid movement and the pungent satirical thrusts of the Jacobite ballad, "Whirry Whigs, Awa' Man", and nothing suggestive of the romantic tenderness, the cheerful and resolute self-dependence, and the lyrical grace of "Logie o' Buchan". Halket is credited with both of these poems, but there is a total lack of evidence on the point. As, however, there is no one else of the period to whom they can be assigned, it is just possible that they are his, and at any rate his claims are supported by a persistent tradition and the weighty surmise of Peter Buchan. Halket is quite likely to have written "A Dialogue between the Devil and George II", a perusal of which, in 1746, caused the Duke of Cumberland to offer a reward of £100. for the author 'alive or dead.' He may also have been the author of a ballad entitled "Schism Displayed".
