= Peter Hackett (mountaineer) =

American physician and mountaineer

Peter H. Hackett is an American mountaineer and medical doctor. He is the third person to have summited Mount Everest in a solo ascent, climbing from South Col to the top on October 24, 1981. He studies the effect of altitude on human physiology, and is the founder of a medical rescue camp on Everest and a rescue clinic and lab on Denali, and the director of the Institute for Altitude Medicine in Colorado.

== Biography ==
In 2000, Peter Hackett was an emergency physician in Grand Junction, Colorado, and a Professor of Medicine at the University of Washington in Seattle. By 2009, he was the director of the Institute for Altitude Medicine in Telluride, Colorado, and a professor at the School of Medicine at the University of Colorado.

=== Medical research ===
In 1973, Hackett was a co-founder of the Himalayan Rescue Association. It established a clinic near Everest Base Camp (which is at 5,380 m (17,700 ft)), where the sick were cared for and information was gathered about mountain sickness. In 1981, as a member of the American Research Expedition, he helped set up a "well-equipped" lab at 5,180 m (17,000 ft)) and a smaller lab at 6,300 m (20,700 ft). In 1982, he and Bill Mills started a rescue clinic and lab on Denali in Alaska, at 4,267 m (14,000 ft) (funded by the US Army and the National Park Service), where again they treated patients with altitude sickness and gathered information. Hackett has also published on drug use among Everest climbers; his 2016 study, co-authored with Andrew Luks, Colin Grissom, and Luanne Freer and published in High Altitude Medicine & Biology, suggested that the use of performance-enhancing substances, "while present on the mountain, isn't a serious problem".

=== Everest expedition ===
Hackett was a member of the 1981 American Medical Research Expedition led by John B. West. He was slated to try for the summit as the second of two groups on October 24, 1981; around noon, Chris Pizzo and Young Tenzing had reached the summit, with Pizzo doing various measurements and taking samples of his own breath for later research. Three hours later Hackett was observed approaching the summit, which he reached at 4 pm. On the descent he fell through a layer of snow at the Hillary Step, and after a drop of 10–15 ft (3.0–4.6 m) he found himself hanging upside down with his right boot, snagged on some rock, holding him up. With his ice axe he righted himself and then found an old rope, still fixed, which he used to pull himself up. He fell a second time, but got up again and descended a thousand feet, where he found Pizzo waiting for him. Together, in the dark, they safely got to Camp 5, on the South Col.

Hackett described some of the effects of hypoxia. At 7,620 m (25,000 ft), while sleeping in his tent without supplementary oxygen, he had a lively hallucination that John West, the expedition leader, was in his tent, and had brought an oxygen bottle with which he filled up the tent. On the way to the summit, he stood on a ledge and "was sure that if I had jumped off from that point, I could have flown. I had this feeling that somehow spirits would come and, and just support me and fly me around the mountains and I could see all these wonderful places down below and visit friends and just get great views of all the mountains." He also said that hypoxia was probably to blame for the fall on the Hillary Step, and the decision-making process that led to his fall.

Hackett was the third person to summit Everest solo, after Franz Oppurg (1978, from the South side) and Reinhold Messner (1980, from the North side).
