= Sir Peter Halkett, 2nd Baronet =

British Army officer and politician (1695–1755)

Sir Peter Halkett
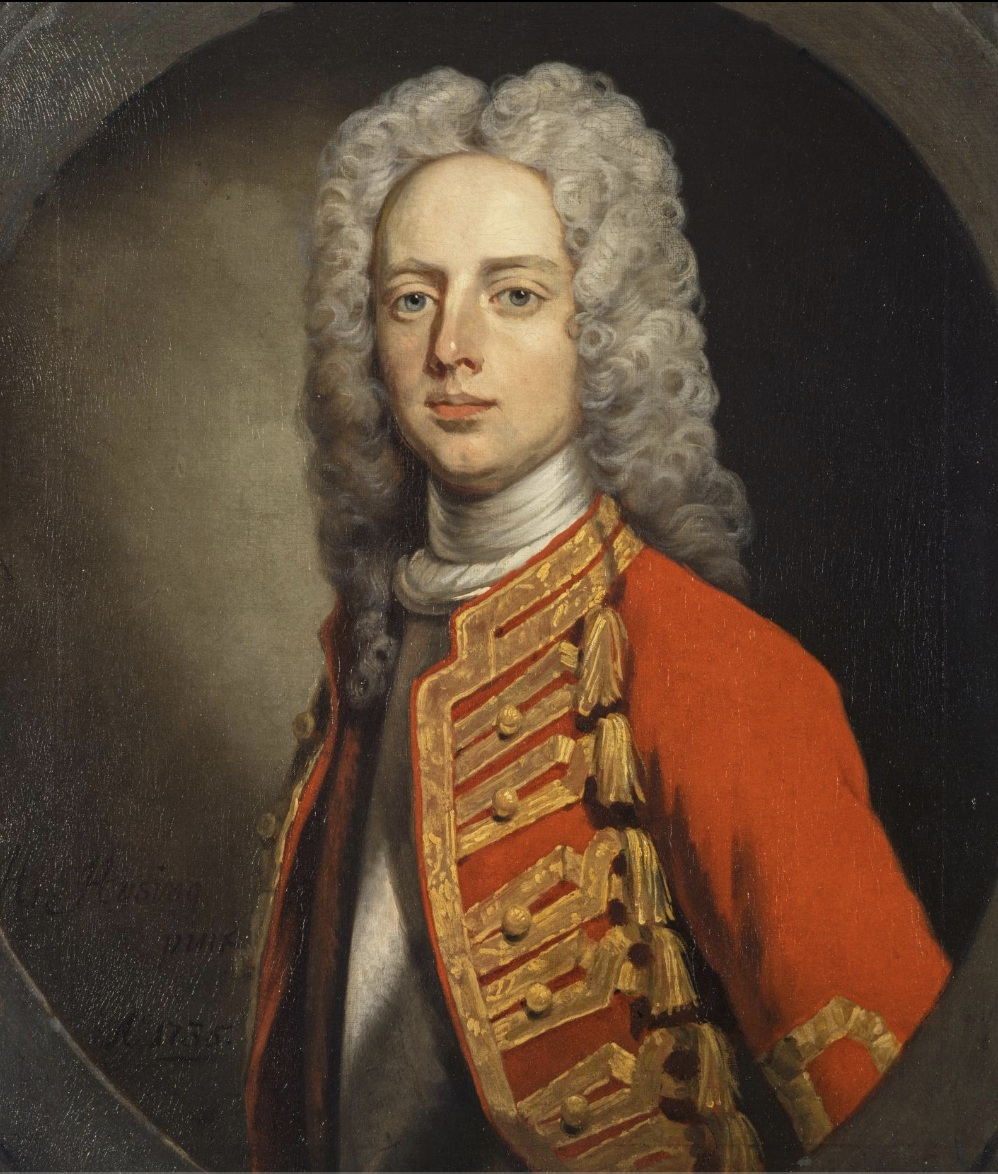
- Possible portrait by Hans Hysing, 1735
- Born: 21 June 1695; Pitfirrane, Fife
- Died: 9 July 1755 (aged 60) Monongahela, Pennsylvania
- Allegiance: Great Britain
- Branch: British Army
- Service years: 1717–1755
- Rank: Colonel
- Commands: 44th Regiment of Foot
- Conflicts: Jacobite rising of 1745; Battle of Prestonpans; French and Indian War; Battle of the Monongahela †

Colonel Sir Peter Halkett, 2nd Baronet (21 June 1695 – 9 July 1755) was a British Army officer and politician who represented Stirling Burghs in the House of Commons of Great Britain from 1734 to 1741. He served in the Jacobite rising of 1745, seeing action at the Battle of Prestonpans. Halkett became colonel of the 44th Regiment of Foot in 1751 and was sent with his regiment to North America in 1754 as part of the French and Indian War. He and his youngest son James served in the Braddock Expedition and were both killed in action at the Battle of the Monongahela on 9 July 1755.

== Life ==
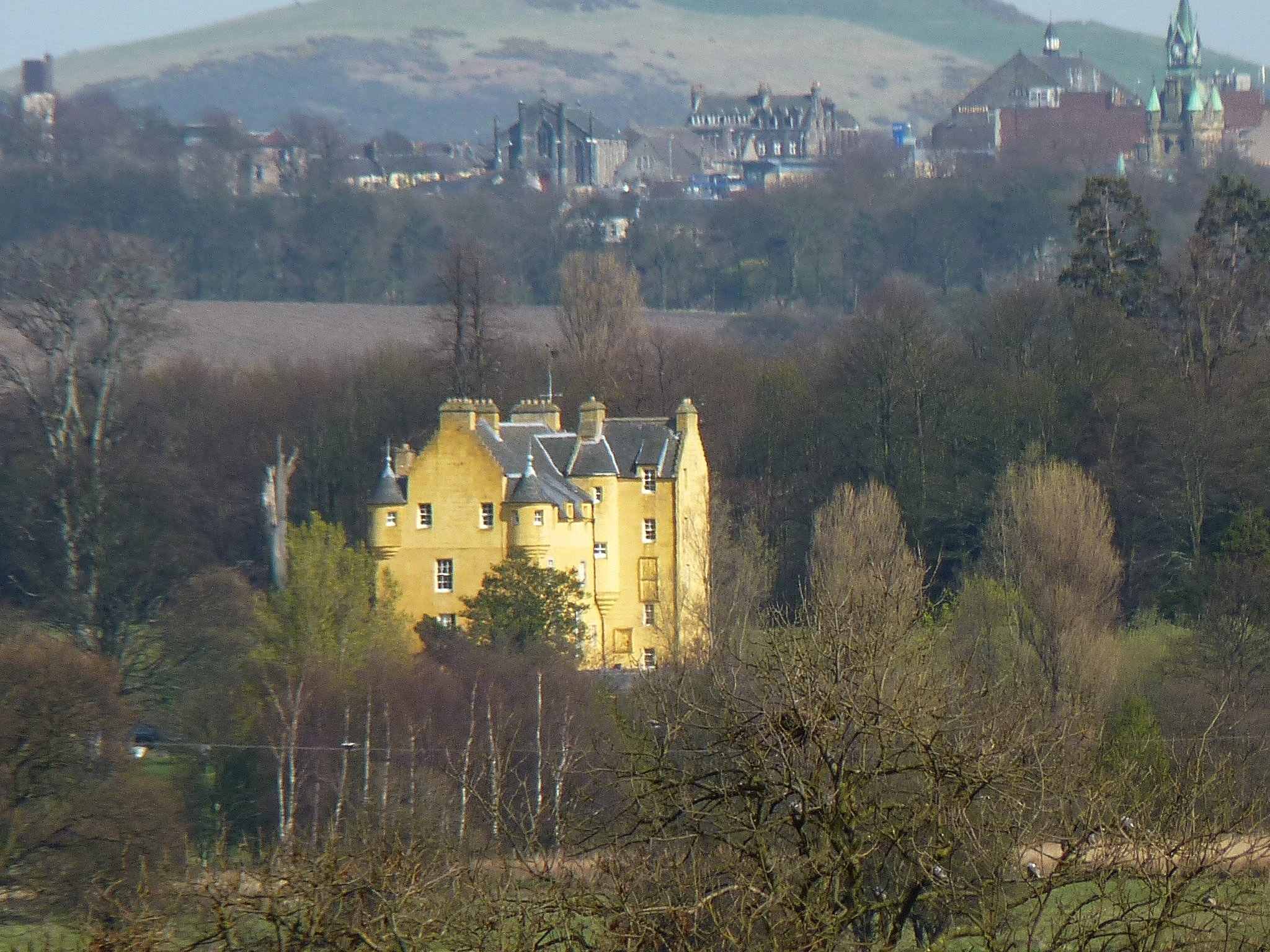
Pitfirrane House

Peter Halkett was born 21 June 1695, eldest son of Sir Peter Wedderburn, who changed his surname to Halkett in 1705 when he inherited Pitfirrane Castle, near Dunfermline from his wife's brother. The house remained in the family until 1951 and is now the clubhouse for Dunfermline Golf Club.

In 1728, he married Lady Amelia Stuart, daughter of Francis, Earl of Moray; they had 3 sons, Peter, Francis and James (died 1755). Francis served as Brigade-major during the 1758 Forbes Expedition, when he retrieved the bodies of his father and younger brother.

== Career ==
In 1717, Halkett was commissioned in the Royal Scots and elected Member of Parliament for Stirling Burghs in 1734. He supported the Walpole administration but declined to stand again in 1741. Instead, he was appointed lieutenant-colonel of the 44th Foot, a new regiment raised by James Long.

During the 1745 Rising, he was in temporary command when the 44th was overrun at the Battle of Prestonpans and captured. The Jacobites were unable to house their prisoners and he was released with other officers after swearing that he would not serve against them for eighteen months. Pressed by his commander, Prince William, Duke of Cumberland, to break his oath, he refused to do so and was punished by dismissal from the army. He succeeded his father as second baronet in 1746.

He was re-instated after appealing his case to George II and in 1751 named as colonel of the regiment, which in 1754 was transferred to the British colonies in North America. The following year, the 44th was assigned to the Braddock Expedition to capture Fort Duquesne (located in present-day Pittsburgh, Pennsylvania, USA) from the French. The column ran into a combined force of French, Canadian and native Indian troops in the woods and were severely routed. More than sixty British officers were killed or wounded; Halkett was among those slain in the battle.

== Sources ==
- Cubbison, Douglas (2010). The British Defeat of the French in Pennsylvania, 1758: A Military History of the Forbes Campaign Against Fort Duquesne. McFarland & Co. ISBN 978-0786447398.
- Sedgwick, Romney, ed. (1970). HALKETT, Peter (1695–1755), of Pitferrane, Fife in The History of Parliament: the House of Commons 1715–1754 (Online ed.). HMSO.

Parliament of Great Britain
Preceded by John Bullock; John Huske	Member of Parliament for Maldon; 1772–1774; With: John Bullock	Succeeded by John Strutt; John Savage Nassau
Military offices
Preceded by John Lee	Colonel, 44th Foot; 1751–1755	Succeeded by Robert Ellison
Baronetage of Nova Scotia
Preceded by Peter Halkett	Baronet (of Pitfirrane); 1746–1755	Succeeded by Peter Halkett
