= Peter Hackett (frontiersman) =

Peter Hackett (c. 1763 – 1828) was an American frontiersman.

== Biography ==
born in approximately 1763 in the English colony of Virginia. It is believed that Peter was the son of Thomas Hackett, likely of Montgomery County, Virginia. As a boy Peter was bonded out to Captain James Estill, in approximately 1771, and was a part of the broad Scotch-Irish migration along the Wilderness Road through the Cumberland Gap from Virginia into what later became known as Kentucky in the late 18th century. In 1779 he was a resident of Boonesborough, one of the first English-speaking settlements beyond the Appalachian Mountains, and lived there until 1780. In 1780 Hackett helped establish Estill's Station, Kentucky, and lived there until about 1788. Peter died in about 1828 in Scott County, Kentucky.

== Estill's Station and the Battle of Little Mountain ==
West of the Appalachian Mountains the American Revolutionary War was an "Indian War." Most American Indians supported the British, who supplied their native allies with muskets and gunpowder and advised raids against civilian settlements. Fort Estill, founded near Boonesborough in 1779 and inhabited by James Hestill, Peter Hackett, and others, was attacked by Wyandot Indians in March 1782. Colonel Benjamin Logan, commanding officer of the region, and stationed at Logan's Station, learned that the Wyandot warriors were in the area on warpath. The Indians, aided by the British in Detroit, had raided from Boonesborough past Estill's Station along the Kentucky River. Logan dispatched 15 men to Captain Estill at Estill's Station with orders to increase his force by 25 more men and reconnoiter the country to the north and east. Following orders, Captain Estill reached the Kentucky River a few miles below the mouth of Station Camp Creek and camped that night at Sweet Lick, now known as Estill Springs. On the day after they left Estill's Station, a body of Indians appeared there at dawn on 20 March, they raided the fort, scalped and killed a Miss Innes in sight of the fortification and took Monk, a slave of Captain Estill, and killed all the cattle.

As soon as the Indians retreated, Samuel South and Peter Hackett, both young men, were dispatched to take the trail of the men and inform them of the news. The boys found them near the mouth of Drowning Creek and Red River early on the morning of March 21. Of the 40 men, approximately 20 had left families within the fort. They returned with the boys to Estill's Station. The remainder crossed the Kentucky river and found the Indian trail. Captain Estill organized a company of 25 men, followed the Indians, and suffered what is known as Estill's Defeat, later known as the Battle of Little Mountain (March 22, 1782) in Montgomery Co. Captain Estill and nine of his men were killed. Peter Hackett, then about 18, was wounded. Both Indians and Whites withdrew, the Indians suffering greater losses. Peter Hackett is believed to have been holding Estill's horse when Estill was mortally wounded. It is said that James was overpowered and killed with a butcher's knife by an Indian chief. James' weakened arm contributed to his inability to defend himself.

== Frontiersman ==
Hackett was a hunter for James Estill. Later Hackett worked as a surveyor for Madison County, Kentucky. Hackett's descendants, including John Hackett (a contemporary of Abraham Lincoln), continued moving west, first to Sangamon County, Illinois, in about 1829, and then to Coles County, Illinois, by about 1841. Lincoln's father also settled his family in Coles County in about 1832, though Lincoln soon struck out on his own. A family legend states that Lincoln stayed at the Hackett farm during the Lincoln-Douglas debates of 1858, a claim that is unlikely to be far-fetched given their common origins and political leanings. Peter Hackett's grandson, O. C. Hackett, was the founding Supervisor of Tuscola, Illinois, and was an early participant in the California gold rush.

== See also ==
- Hackett (surname)
- Western theater of the American Revolutionary War

== Sources and external links ==
- Fort Boonesborough State Park official web site.
- Western Kentucky Archives
- Madison County, Kentucky Circuit Court, Deposition of Peter Hackett, taken Wednesday the 8th of May 1811
