= O. C. Hackett =

19th-century Illinois pioneer

Oliver Cromwell Hackett (born March 29, 1822, in Scott County, Kentucky) was an Illinois pioneer and participant in the California Gold Rush. His father was John Hackett, and his grandfather was noted Kentucky frontiersman and militiaman of the American Revolution, Peter Hackett. John Hackett moved the family, from Kentucky to Coles County, Illinois, in 1835. Oliver Hackett married Ellen Roxanne (Wyeth) on March 14, 1854. His children included Frederick W. Hackett. He died April 8, 1905, in Tuscola, Illinois.

In late 1849 or 1850, Hackett joined the California Gold Rush, traveling to California by way of the Isthmus of Panama and setting up a claim in the Auburn area. Hackett soon left the gold fields to return to the farm in Illinois.

In the mid-1850s Hackett bought a farm just outside Tuscola, in Douglas County, Illinois. Hackett was the founding Supervisor of Tuscola township, and was elected in 1868. He was elected as supervisor with a majority of only one vote over W. B. Ervin. Hackett planted Hackett's Grove, a sassafras grove situated on Section 31, Township 16, Range 9, on the east side of the township. This 20-acre (81,000 m^{2}) grove is traversed by a branch of Scattering Fork of the Embarrass River, long known as Hackett's Run, and according to the History of Douglas County (1884), the grove had been owned by the Hacketts since long before Douglas County had an existence.

== See also ==
- List of people associated with the California Gold Rush
