= Martin Hackett =

Irish hurler

Personal information
- Native name: Máirtín Haicéid (Irish)
- Born: 4 January 1891 Toomevara, County Tipperary, Ireland
- Died: Unknown
- Occupation: Shop assistant

Sport
- Sport: Hurling
- Position: Right corner-forward
Club
- Years: Club
- Collegians
Club titles
- Dublin titles: 1
Inter-county
- Years: County
- 1917: Dublin
Inter-county titles
- Leinster titles: 1
- All-Irelands: 1

Martin Hackett (born 4 January 1891) was an Irish hurler who played for the Dublin senior team.

Hackett made his first appearance for the team during the 1917 championship and was a regular member of the starting fifteen for just one season. It was a successful year as he won one All-Ireland SHC medal and one Leinster SHC medal.

At club level, Hackett was a one-time county club championship medalist with Collegians.

His brother, Stephen, was an All-Ireland SHC winner with Tipperary.
