= John B. West =

Australian physiologists (born 1928)

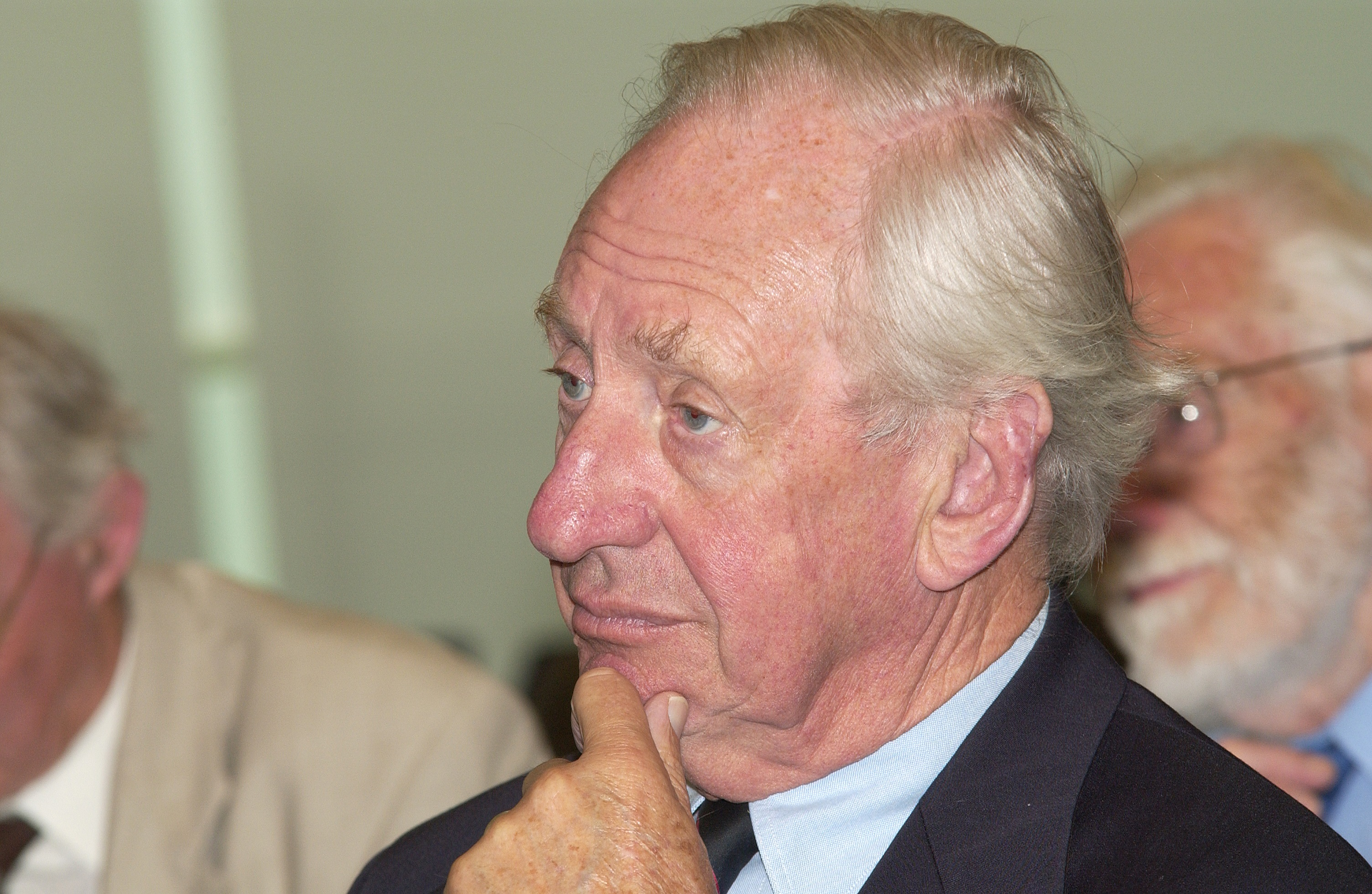
- July 2005
- Born: 1928 (age 97–98); Adelaide, Australia
- Education: University of Adelaide
- Occupation: Respiratory physiologist

John B. West FRCP (born 1928) is a respiratory physiologist who made major research contributions in the area of ventilation-perfusion relationships in the lung. He led a medical research expedition to Mount Everest in 1981, which investigated the influence of altitude and exertion on human physiology.

== Early life and education ==
West was born in Adelaide, Australia in 1928. He graduated in medicine (M.B.B.S., 1952) from the University of Adelaide, Australia. Subsequently he was awarded M.D. (1959) and D.Sc. (1980) degrees from the same university.

== Career ==
West worked at Hammersmith Hospital in London in 1960 and received his Ph.D. degree from London University in the same year.

As a physiologist, he joined Sir Edmund Hillary's 1960–61 Silver Hut expedition, a scientific and mountaineering expedition to the Himalayas. After working as a postdoctoral fellow with Hermann Rahn at Buffalo in 1961-62, he returned to London as Director of the Respiratory Research Group at Postgraduate Medical School (1962–1967) and was promoted to University Reader there in 1968.

After sabbatical leave at the NASA Ames Research Center at Moffett Field, California in 1968, he was invited to join the faculty of the new School of Medicine at the University of California at San Diego as professor of medicine and physiology. Since it was first published in 1974, his book Respiratory Physiology: the Essentials (Lippincott Williams & Wilkins) has become the most widely used introductory text in respiratory physiology. It has been translated into at least 17 languages.

He was a member of the NIH Cardiovascular and Pulmonary Study Section from 1971 to 1975, and chairman from 1973 to 1975; a member of the Physiology Committee of the National Board of Medical Examiners (1973–1976); and a member of the Cardiopulmonary Council of AHA (1977–78).

After election to membership in American Physiological Society in 1970 and to Council in 1981, in 1983 he became president elect, and became the 57th APS President for 1984-85.

In 1981, he led the 1981 American Medical Research Expedition to Mount Everest. For NASA he has been chairman of the Science Verification Committee for Spacelab in 1983 and a member of their Advisory Committee on Scientific Uses of Space Station in 1984. Also in that year he served as a member of a NAS Committee on Space Biology.

== Awards ==
Awards include:

- Josiah H. Macy, Jr., Foundation Scholar, in 1974
- Ernst Jung Prize for Medicine in Hamburg, West Germany, in 1977
- Presidential Citation of the American College of Chest Physicians in 1977
- Kaiser Award for Excellence in Teaching in 1980
- University of California, San Diego, Revelle Medal 2018

He has held nearly twenty endowed lectureships, including

- the Wiltshire Memorial Lectureship at King's College, London (1971);
- the Brailsford Robertson Memorial Lectureship at Adelaide University (1978);
- the Brompton Annual Lectureship at Brompton Hospital, London (1979);
- the Harveian Lectureship in London (1981);
- a Centenary Lectureship at Auckland, New Zealand (1983); and
- Telford Memorial Lectureship at Manchester University in England (1983).
