= Tuscola Township, Douglas County, Illinois =

Tuscola Township
- Township
- Location in Douglas County

- Douglas County's location in Illinois
- Coordinates: 39°49′01″N 88°17′11″W
- Country: United States
- State: Illinois
- County: Douglas
- Established: November 5, 1867

Area
  - Total: 62.59 sq mi (162.1 km^{2})
  - Land: 62.51 sq mi (161.9 km^{2})
  - Water: 0.08 sq mi (0.21 km^{2}) 0.13%
- Elevation: 660 ft (200 m)

Population (2020)
  - Total: 5,460
  - Density: 87.3/sq mi (33.7/km^{2})
- Time zone: UTC-6 (CST)
  - Summer (DST): UTC-5 (CDT)
- ZIP codes: 61910, 61919, 61953
- FIPS code: 17-041-76420

Tuscola Township is one of nine townships in Douglas County, Illinois, USA. As of the 2020 census, its population was 5,460 and it contained 2,563 housing units.

== Geography ==
According to the 2021 census gazetteer files, Tuscola Township has a total area of 62.59 square miles (162.11 km^{2}), of which 62.51 square miles (161.90 km^{2}) (or 99.87%) is land and 0.08 square miles (0.21 km^{2}) (or 0.13%) is water.

=== Cities, towns, villages ===
- Tuscola

=== Unincorporated towns ===
- Hayes at 39.862532°N 88.281160°W
- Meadowview at 39.790032°N 88.275326°W
- Northgate at 39.806976°N 88.277270°W
- Parkview at 39.808921°N 88.285326°W
- Southland Acres at 39.789476°N 88.284770°W
- West Ridge at 39.825865°N 88.21699°W
- Yoder Addition at 39.805865°N 88.276437°W

=== Cemeteries ===
The township contains these three cemeteries: Mount Zion, Nelson and Tuscola Township.

=== Major highways ===
- Interstate 57
- U.S. Route 36
- U.S. Route 45

=== Airports and landing strips ===
- Cooper Landing Field (historical)
- Tuscola Airport

== Demographics ==
As of the 2020 census there were 5,460 people, 2,297 households, and 1,320 families residing in the township. The population density was 87.23 inhabitants per square mile (33.68/km^{2}). There were 2,563 housing units at an average density of 40.95 per square mile (15.81/km^{2}). The racial makeup of the township was 92.49% White, 0.48% African American, 0.22% Native American, 1.04% Asian, 0.02% Pacific Islander, 1.43% from other races, and 4.32% from two or more races. Hispanic or Latino of any race were 3.08% of the population.

There were 2,297 households, out of which 29.50% had children under the age of 18 living with them, 46.02% were married couples living together, 8.18% had a female householder with no spouse present, and 42.53% were non-families. 37.70% of all households were made up of individuals, and 16.90% had someone living alone who was 65 years of age or older. The average household size was 2.24 and the average family size was 2.84.

The township's age distribution consisted of 22.1% under the age of 18, 8.3% from 18 to 24, 27.1% from 25 to 44, 27.7% from 45 to 64, and 14.7% who were 65 years of age or older. The median age was 39.6 years. For every 100 females, there were 106.7 males. For every 100 females age 18 and over, there were 104.5 males.

The median income for a household in the township was $57,088, and the median income for a family was $85,735. Males had a median income of $50,134 versus $26,445 for females. The per capita income for the township was $32,901. About 10.6% of families and 11.7% of the population were below the poverty line, including 19.1% of those under age 18 and 8.9% of those age 65 or over.

Historical population
Census	Pop.	Note	%±
1960	5,405		—
1970	5,395		−0.2%
1980	5,357		−0.7%
1990	5,056		−5.6%
2000	5,334		5.5%
2010	5,259		−1.4%
2020	5,460		3.8%
U.S. Decennial Census

== School districts ==
- Tuscola Community Unit School District 301
- Villa Grove Community Unit School District 302

== Political districts ==
- State House District 110
- State Senate District 55
