= Sir Peter Halkett, 6th Baronet =

Royal Navy Admiral (c. 1765–1839)

Admiral Sir Peter Halkett Bt
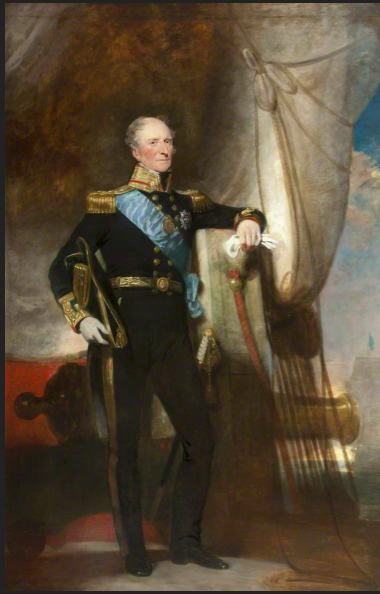
- Admiral Sir Peter Halkett
- Born: 1765; Unknown
- Died: 7 October 1839 (aged 73–74); Pitfirrane, Fife
- Military career
- Allegiance: United Kingdom
- Branch: Royal Navy
- Service years: c. 1780s–1839
- Rank: Admiral
- Conflicts: French Revolutionary Wars; Battle of Camperdown; Napoleonic Wars; Second Battle of Copenhagen

Admiral Sir Peter Halkett, 6th Baronet (c. 1765 – 7 October 1839) was a senior Royal Navy officer of the early nineteenth century who is best known for his service in the French Revolutionary Wars. The younger son a Scottish baronet, Halkett joined the Navy and by 1793 was a lieutenant, becoming a post captain after service at the Siege of Williamstadt in the Netherlands. He later commanded the frigate HMS Circe during the Battle of Camperdown in 1797 and later achieved success in the Caribbean in command of HMS Apollo. He was made a rear-admiral in 1812, but his first major command was in the West Indies in 1836, lasting two years. Shortly before his death he inherited the Halkett Baronetcy from his brother Charles, later passing it to his son John.

== Life ==
Peter Halkett was born in 1765, the second son of Sir John Halkett, the 4th Halkett Baronet of Pitfirrane in Fife. At a young age, Halkett entered the Royal Navy and as a lieutenant achieved his first command, that of the tiny sloop HMS Placentia in 1789. By 1793 was serving on HMS Syren, which conveyed the Duke of York to the Netherlands for service in the French Revolutionary Wars. During the campaign, Halkett served in gunboats assisting the Dutch garrison during the Siege of Williamstadt and impressed the Duke with his activity, being rewarded with a promotion to post captain and an expensive medal from the Prince of Orange.

On his return to Britain, Halkett was given command of the frigate HMS Circe in the North Sea, and in 1797 his ship was one of the few not to suffer from the effects of the Nore Mutiny that brought the fleet to a standstill. For his conduct during the crisis, Halkett was praised by the Admiralty and later in the year Circe acted as a signal frigate for the fleet under Admiral Adam Duncan that destroyed a Dutch fleet at the Battle of Camperdown. In the aftermath of the battle, Halkett moved to the larger frigate HMS Apollo, but his ship was lost on the Dutch coast, Halkett and his men rescued by a Prussian ship. At the subsequent court martial Halkett was cleared of any blame in the loss of his ship, the pilot being broke and rendered incapable of ever serving his Majesty, and he was given command of a new frigate, also named HMS Apollo.

In Apollo, Halkett sailed for the West Indies and remained there for two years, capturing a number of French and Spanish vessels, including privateers. He returned to Britain in 1802 and subsequently joined the ship of the line HMS Ganges. At the Second Battle of Copenhagen in 1807 Ganges carried commodore Richard Goodwin Keats' flag. Halkett remained in command of Ganges until 1812 when he was made a rear-admiral. Halkett did not see a lot of subsequent high command, although he remained in service during the Napoleonic Wars, stationed at Portsmouth aboard HMS Gladiator. After the war Halkett remained in service, becoming a vice-admiral in 1821 and a full admiral in 1837. In 1837 he inherited his father's baronetcy from his brother. In 1836 he got his only major seagoing command when he spent two years as Commander in Chief of the North America and West Indies Station, before returning to Britain.

Halkett died at home in Pitfirrane in October 1839. His wife Elizabeth Todd, whom he had married in 1802, had died in 1814, but Halkett was survived by his son John, who inherited the baronetcy.

== Links ==
- Halkett Portrait

Military offices
Preceded by Sir George Cockburn	Commander-in-Chief, North America and West Indies Station; 1836–1837	Succeeded by Sir Charles Paget
Baronetage of Nova Scotia
Preceded by Charles Halkett	Baronet (of Pitfirrane, Fife); 1837–1839	Succeeded by John Halkett
