= Halkett baronets =

Extinct baronetcy in the Baronetage of Nova Scotia

There have been two Halkett Baronetcies, both in the Baronetage of Nova Scotia — one in 1662 for Charles Halkett and the other in 1697 for politician Peter Wedderburn, who changed his name to Halkett in 1705. Both baronetcies are extinct.

== Halkett baronets (25 January 1662) ==
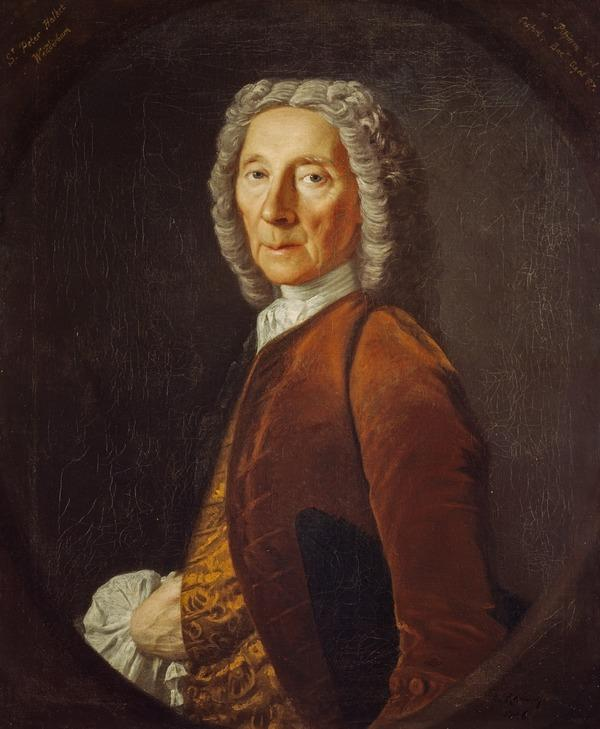
Sir Peter Halkett Wedderburn, 1st Bart of Pitfirrane and Gosford (c. 1659-1746), painting by Allan Ramsay, 1746.

- Sir Charles Halkett, 1st Baronet (died 1697)
- Sir James Halkett, 2nd Baronet (died 1705)

== Wedderburn, later Halkett baronets of Pitfirrane, Fife (31 December 1697) ==
- Sir Peter Halkett, 1st Baronet (c. 1660–1746)
- Sir Peter Halkett, 2nd Baronet (1695–1755)
- Sir Peter Halkett, 3rd Baronet (died 1792)
- Sir John Halkett, 4th Baronet (1720–1793) born John Wedderburn who married Elizabeth Fletcher
- Sir Charles Halkett, 5th Baronet (1764–1837)
- Sir Peter Halkett, 6th Baronet (1765–1839)
- Sir John Halkett, 7th Baronet (1805–1847)
- Sir Peter Arthur Halkett, 8th Baronet (1834–1904)
  - Madeline
  - Mabel

== Coat of arms ==
Coat of arms of Halkett baronets
Crest A falcon's head erased ppr. Escutcheon Sable three piles conjoined in base Argent on a chief of the second a lion passant guardant Gules. Supporters Two falcons ppr. belled and jessed Or. Motto Fides sufficit
