= List of first ascents of Mount Everest by nationality =

== List ==
Country	Date	Male climber	Date	Female climber	References
Afghanistan	2023-05-17	Samuel Dean Sidiqi			
Albania	2012-05-26	Gjergj Bojaxhi	2017-05-22	Uta Ibrahimi	
Algeria	2008-05-25	Nadir Dendounne			
American Samoa (US)					
Andorra			2018-05-22	Anna Brown	
Angola					
Anguilla (UK)					
Antigua and Barbuda					
Argentina	1999-05-15	Tommy Heinrich	2009-05-19	Mercedes Sahores	
Armenia	2002-05-16	Igor Khalatian	2016-05-20	Irena Kharazova	
Aruba (Netherlands)					
Australia	1984-10-03	Tim Macartney-Snape and Greg Mortimer	1997	Brigitte Muir	
Austria	1978-05-08	Peter Habeler	2010-05-21	Gerlinde Kaltenbrunner	
Azerbaijan	2007-05-19	Israfil Ashurly	2023-05-19	Elmira Aslanova	
Bahamas	2018-05-22	Richard Beek			
Bahrain					
Bangladesh	2010-05-23	Musa Ibrahim	2012-05-19	Nishat Majumder	
Barbados					
Belarus	1999	Victor Koulabatchenko	2021-05-23	Ala Kasabutskaya	
Belgium	1990-05-10	Rudy Van Snick	1992-05-12	Ingrid Baeyens	
Belize					
Benin					
Bermuda (UK)					
Bhutan	2024-05-20	Jigme Palden Dorji			
Bolivia	1999	Bernardo Guarachi			
Bosnia and Herzegovina	2012-5-19	Naim Logić			
Botswana					
Brazil	1995-05-14	Waldemar Niclevicz and Mozart Catão			
Brunei					
Bulgaria	1984-04-20	Hristo Prodanov	2009-05	Petya Kolcheva	
Burkina Faso					
Burundi					
Cambodia					
Cameroon					
Canada	1982-10-05	Laurie Skreslet	1986-05-20	Sharon Wood	
Cape Verde					
Cayman Islands (UK)					
Central African Republic					
Chad					
Chile	1992	Rodrigo Jordan	2018-05-22	María Paz Valenzuela	
China	1960-05-25	Wang Fuzhou, Qu Yinhua	2010-05-24	Wang Lei	
Colombia	2001	Manuel Arturo Barrios and Fernando González Rubio			
Comoros					
Democratic Republic of the Congo					
Republic of the Congo					
Cook Islands (New Zealand)					
Costa Rica	2012-05-24	Warner Rojas	2024-05-22	Ligia Madrigal	
Croatia	1999-02-04	Nikola Mišljenović	2009-05-19	Darija Bostjančić Iris Bostjančić Ena Vrbek Milena Šijan	
Cuba	2006-06-24	Osvany Aguilar			
Curacao (Netherlands)					
Cyprus	2012-05-19	George Andreou	2023-05-17	Oksana Kushnir	
Czechia	1991-05-17	Leopold Sulovský	1999-05-05	Renata Chlumska	
Denmark	1995-05	Michael Knakkergaard Jørgensen	1996-05-10	Lene Gammelgaard	
Djibouti					
Dominica					
Dominican Republic	2011-05-21	Karim Mella	2024-05-21	Thais Herrera	
Ecuador	1999-05-25	Iván Vallejo	1999	Paulina Aulestia	
Egypt	2007-05-17	Omar Samra	2022-05-16	Manal Rostom	
El Salvador			2022-05-12	Alfa Karina Valle Arrué	
Equatorial Guinea					
Eritrea					
Estonia	2003-05-23	Alar Sikk	2021-05-23	Krisli Melesk	
Eswatini (Swaziland)					
Ethiopia					
Falkland Islands (UK)					
Faroe Islands (Denmark)	2014-05-25	Arne Vatnhamar			
Fiji					
Finland	1997	Veikka Gustafsson	2010-05-17	Carina Räihä	
France	1978-10-15	Pierre Mazeaud, Jean Afanassieff, and Nicolas Jaeger	1990-10-5	Christine Janin	
French Polynesia (France)					
Gabon					
Gambia					
Gaza Strip/Palestine			2011-05-21	Suzanne Al Houby	
Georgia	1999-05-12	Lev Sarkisov			
Germany	1979-05-10	Reinhard Karl	1979	Hannelore Schmatz	
Ghana					
Gibraltar (UK)					
Greece	1999	Constantine Niarchos	2019	Christina Flampouri and Vanessa Arxontidou	
Greenland (Denmark)					
Grenada					
Guam (US)					
Guatemala	2001-06	Jaime Viñals	2010-05-23	Andrea Cardona	
Guernsey (UK)					
Guinea					
Guinea-Bissau					
Guyana					
Haiti					
Honduras	2022-05-12	Ronald Quintero			
Hong Kong	1992-05-12	Cham Yick-kai	2017-05-21	Tsang Yin-hung	
Hungary	2002-05-25	Zsolt Erőss	2009	Anita Ugyan	
Iceland	2002-05-16	Haraldur Örn Ólafsson	2017-05-21	Vilborg Arna Gissurardóttir	
India	1953-05-29	Tenzing Norgay	1984-05-23	Bachendri Pal	
Indonesia					
Iran	1990-10-05	Hooman Aprin	2013	Parvaneh Kazemi	
Iraq	2024-05-20	Dadvan Yousuf			
Ireland	1993-05-27	Dawson Stelfox			
Isle of Man (UK)					
Israel	1992	Doron Erel	2021-05-23	Danielle Wolfson	
Italy	1978-05-08	Reinhold Messner	2003-05-23	Manuela Di Centa	
Ivory Coast					
Jamaica					
Japan	1970-05-11	Matsuura Teruo, Naomi Uemura	1975-05-16	Junko Tabei	
Jersey (UK)					
Jordan	2008-05-25	Mostafa Salameh			
Kazakhstan			2024-05-12	Anar Burasheva	
Kenya	2022-05-12	James Kagambi			
Kiribati					
Korea, North					
Korea, South	1977-09-15	Ko Sang-Don (고상돈)	2004	Oh Eun-Sun	
Kosovo			2017-05-22	Uta Ibrahimi	
Kurdistan	2024-05-20	Dadvan Yousuf			
Kuwait	2003-05-23	Zed Al Refai			
Kyrgyzstan					
Laos					
Latvia					
Lebanon	2006-05-15	Maxim Chaya	2019-05-19	Fatima Deryan	
Lesotho					
Liberia					
Libya					
Liechtenstein					
Lithuania	1993-05-10	Vladas Vitkauskas	2013-05-22	Edita Nichols	
Luxembourg	1992-10-01	Eugène Berger	2026-05-20	Sandra Maria Wieliczko	
Macau (China)					
Madagascar					
Malawi					
Malaysia	1997-05-23	M. Magendran			
Maldives					
Mali					
Malta	2010-05-17	Gregory Attard, Marco Cremona, and Robert Gatt			
Marshall Islands					
Mauritania					
Mauritius	2011-05-26	Jaysen Arumugum			
Mexico	1989-05-16	Ricardo Torres Nava	1999-05-05	Elsa Ávila	
Micronesia, Federated States of					
Moldova	2010	Andrei Carpenco	2021-05-23	Olga Ţapordei	
Monaco					
Mongolia	2005-05-30	Gotovdirij Usukhbayar			
Montenegro	2010-05-20	Đorđije Vujičić, Dragutin Vujović, and Marko Blečić			
Montserrat (UK)					
Morocco	2013-06-03	Nacer Ben Abdeljalil	2017-05-17	Bouchra Baibanou	
Mozambique					
Myanmar (Burma)	2016-05	Pyae Phyo Aung and Win Ko Ko			
Namibia					
Nauru					
Nepal	1953-05-29	Tenzing Norgay	1993-04- 12	Pasang Lhamu Sherpa	
Netherlands	2002	Wilco van Rooijen	1999-05-13	Katja Staartjes	
New Caledonia (France)					
New Zealand	1953-05-29	Edmund Hillary			
Nicaragua					
Niger					
Nigeria					
North Macedonia	1989-05-10	Dimitar Ilievski-Murato			
Northern Mariana Islands (US)					
Norway	1985-04-29	Arne Næss Jr.	2004-05-20	Randi Skaug	
Oman	2010-05-23	Khalid_Al-Siyabi	2019-05	Nadhira Al Harthy	
Pakistan	2000-05-17	Nazir Sabir	2013-05-19	Samina Baig	
Palau					
Panama	2009-05-23	Michael Morales			
Papua New Guinea					
Paraguay	2018-05	Franz P. Rassel			
Peru	1992	Augusto Ortega	2016-05-19	Silvia Vasquez-Lavado	
Philippines	2006-05-17	Leo Oracion	2007-05-16	Janet Belarmino, Carina Dayondo and Noelle Wenceslao	Main article: 2006 Philippine Mount Everest expedition
Poland	1980-02-17	Krzysztof Wielicki	1978-10-16	Wanda Rutkiewicz	
Portugal	1995-05-18	João Garcia	2013-05-21	Maria Da Conceição	
Puerto Rico (US)	2002-02-10	Julio Bird III	2026-05-20	Nicole Santiago	
Qatar	2013-05-13	Mohammed bin Abdulla Al Thani	2022-05-27	Asma Al Thani	
Romania	1995-05-17	Constantin Lăcătuşu	May 2019	Otilia Ciotau	
Russia	1982-05-04	Evgeny Vinogradov	1990-05-10	Ekaterina Nikolaevna Ivanova	
Rwanda					
Saint Barthelemy (France)					
Saint Helena, Ascension and Tristan da Cunha (UK)					
Saint Kitts and Nevis					
Saint Lucia					
Saint Martin (France)					
Saint Pierre and Miquelon (France)					
Saint Vincent and the Grenadines					
Samoa	2022-05	Manoah Ainuu	2016-10-25	Rosita Afele	
San Marino					
Sao Tome and Principe					
Saudi Arabia	2008-05-21	Farouk Saad Hamad Al-Zuman	2013-05-18	Raha Moharrak	
Senegal					
Serbia	2000-05-25	Aleksa Orlović	2007-05	Dragana Rajblović	
Seychelles					
Sierra Leone					
Singapore	1998-05-25	Edwin Siew and Khoo Swee Chiow	2009-05-20	Lee Li Hui, Esther Tan, and Jane Lee	
Sint Maarten (Netherlands)					
Slovakia	1984-10-15	Zoltán Demján and Jozef Psotka	2024-05-12	Lucia Janičová	
Slovenia	1979	Andrej Štremfelj	1990-10	Marija Štremfelj	
Solomon Islands					
Somalia					
South Africa	1996-05-25	Ian Woodall	1996-05-25	Cathy O'Dowd	
South Sudan					
Spain	1980-05-14	Martín Zabaleta		Araceli Segarra	
Sri Lanka	2018-05-22	Johann Peries	2016-05-21	Jayanthi Kuru-Utumpala	
Sudan					
Suriname					
Swaziland	2003-05-26	Sibusiso Vilane			
Sweden	1990-05-11	Mikael Reuterswärd and Oskar Kihlborg	1999-05-05	Renata Chlumska	
Switzerland	1956-05-23	Ernst Schmied and Jürg Marmet	2001-05-25	Evelyne Binsack	
Syria	2019-05-21	Samer Akkad			
Taiwan	1993-05-05	Wu Chin-hsiung	1995	Jiang Xiuzhen	
Tajikistan		Vitaly Khinenson			
Tanzania	2012-05-25	Wilfred Moshi	2021-05-25	Rawan Dakik	
Thailand	2008-05-22	Vitidnan Rojanapanich	2016-05-23	Dr. Napassaporn Chumnarnsit	
Timor-Leste					
Togo					
Tonga					
Trinidad and Tobago					
Tunisia	2016-05	Tahar Manaï			
Turkey	1995-05-17	Nasuh Mahruki	2006-05-15	Eylem Elif Maviş	
Turkmenistan					
Turks and Caicos Islands (UK)					
Tuvalu					
Uganda					
Ukraine	1999	Vladislav Terzyul	2016-05-20	Irina Halay	
United Arab Emirates	2011	Omar Al Memari	2022-05-14	Nayla Nasir Albaloushi	
United Kingdom	1975-09-24	Doug Scott	1993-05-17	Rebecca Stephens	
United States	1963-05-22	Willi Unsoeld, Tom Hornbein	1988-09-29	Stacy Allison	
Uruguay			2022-05-14	Vanessa Estol	
Uzbekistan	1998	Ristam Radjapov	1998	Svetlana Baskakova	
Vanuatu					
Venezuela	2001-05-23	José Antonio Delgado and Marcus Tobía			
Vietnam	2008-05-22	Bùi Văn Ngợi, Phan Thanh Nhiên, Nguyễn Mậu Linh	2022-06-16	Nguyễn Thị Thanh Nhã	
Virgin Islands (UK)					
Virgin Islands (US)					
Wallis and Futuna (France)					
West Bank/Palestine	2013-05-22	Raed Zidan	2011-05-21	Suzanne Al Houby	
Western Sahara					
Yemen					
Zambia			2019	Saray Khumalo	
Zimbabwe					

== See also ==
- Timeline of Mount Everest expeditions
