= Timeline of Mount Everest expeditions =

Mount Everest and surrounding terrain (rendered from data by US National Snow and Ice Data Center and Landsat 8)

Mount Everest is the world's highest mountain, with a peak at 8,848.86 m (29,031 ft 8 1/2 in) above sea level. It is situated in the Himalayan range of Solukhumbu district (Province 1 in present days), Nepal.

== Timeline ==
Climbers who have reached the summit of Everest divided by nationality of origin;

=== 1921: Reconnaissance expedition ===
The first British expedition—organized and financed by the newly formed Mount Everest Committee—came under the leadership of Colonel Charles Howard-Bury, with Harold Raeburn as mountaineering leader, and included George Mallory, Guy Bullock, and Edward Oliver Wheeler. It was primarily for mapping and reconnaissance to discover whether a route to the summit could be found from the north side. As Raeburn's health broke down, Mallory assumed responsibility for most of the exploration to the north and east of the mountain. He wrote to his wife: "We are about to walk off the map..." After five months of arduous climbing around the base of the mountain, Wheeler explored the hidden East Rongbuk Glacier and its route to the base of the North Col. On September 23, Mallory, Bullock, and Wheeler reached the North Col at 7,020 metres (23,031 ft) before being forced back by strong winds. To Mallory's experienced eye, the route up the North ridge intersecting the NE Ridge and from there to the summit looked long, but feasible for a fresher party.

=== 1922: First attempt ===
The second British expedition, under Brigadier-General Charles Granville Bruce and climbing leader Lt-Col. Edward Lisle Strutt, and containing Mallory, returned for a full-scale attempt on the mountain. On May 21, they climbed to 8,225 m (26,985 ft) on the North Ridge before retreating. They were the first humans to climb above 8,000 m (26,247 ft) on a mountain. The scope of this accomplishment is reflected by the fact that there are only 14 mountains on Earth—the eight-thousanders—that reach and exceed 8,000 metres. At that moment, Mallory and Strutt had exceeded the summit of all but five other mountains on the planet.

A day later, George Finch and Geoffrey Bruce climbed up the North Ridge and Face to 8,321 m (27,300 ft) using oxygen for the first time. They climbed from the North Col to their highest camp at a phenomenal rate of 900 vertical feet per hour (275 vertical metres per hour), and were the first climbers to sleep using oxygen.

=== 1924: Mallory and Irvine ===
The third British expedition was also led by Brigadier-General Bruce, although becoming indisposed as a result of a flare-up of malaria, he relinquished leadership of the expedition to Lt-Col. Edward Norton, with Mallory promoted to climbing leader. Geoffrey Bruce, Howard Somervell, and John Noel returned from the previous year, along with newcomers Noel Odell and Andrew Irvine.

On June 2, Mallory and Bruce set off from the North Col (C-4) to make the first summit attempt, but extreme wind and cold, exhaustion, and the refusal of the porters to carry farther led Mallory to abandon the attempt and the next day the party returned to the North Col camp.

On June 4, Norton and Somervell attempted an oxygenless summit in perfect weather; throat trouble forced Somervell to abandon the climb at about 8,500 metres (27,887 ft) while Norton continued on alone, reaching a height of 8,573 m (28,126 ft), just 275 m (900 ft) short of the summit. Exhausted, he turned back and rejoined Somervell for the descent.

On June 8, Mallory and Irvine left their high camp (C-6) at 8,138 m (26,700 ft) to attempt the summit, using Irvine's modified oxygen apparatus. Odell, climbing in support below, wrote in his diary that at 7,900 m (25,919 ft) he "saw Mallory & Irvine on the ridge, nearing base of final pyramid" climbing what he thought at the time was the very difficult Second Step at 12:50 pm. It was the last time the two were seen alive; whether either of them reached the summit remains a question still discussed and studied.

Back in England, the climbing establishment pressured Odell to change his view. After about six months he began to equivocate on which Step it was he saw them—from the Second to possibly the First. If the First, they had no chance of having reached the top; if the Second, they would have had about three hours of oxygen each and the summit was at least three hours away. It is conceivable (though unlikely) that Mallory might have taken Irvine's remaining oxygen and attempted to reach the summit alone.

One possible scenario is that the two reached the First Step at about 10:30 am, and Mallory, seeing the treacherous nature of the traverse to the Second Step, elected to go it alone. He may have reconnoitered the base of the climbing crux and decided it was not for him that day. He returned, picked up Irvine and the two decided to climb the First Step for a look around and to photograph the complex approach to the Second Step. It was perhaps when climbing this small promontory that they were spotted from below by Odell, who assumed that, since they were ascending, they must therefore have been on the Second Step, although it is now difficult to believe that the two would still be climbing from so low down at a time—five hours late—that was considered to be the turn-around hour. Descending from the First Step, the two continued down when, at 2 pm, they were hit by a severe snow squall. Roping up, Mallory, leading, may have slipped, pulling himself and Irvine down. The rope must have caught to inflict severe rope-jerk injury around Mallory's (and presumably Irvine's) waist. Some researchers believe Irvine was able to stay high and struggle along the crest of the Northeast Ridge another 100 yards, only to succumb to cold and possible injuries from the fall. Others believe that the two became separated after the fall by the near white-out conditions of the squall. Based on his final location, it would seem that Mallory had continued straight down in search of his partner, while Irvine, also injured, might have continued diagonally down through the Yellow Band.

In 1979, climber Wang Hongbao of China revealed to the climbing leader of a Japanese expedition that in 1975, while taking a stroll from his bivouac, he had discovered "an English dead" at 8,100 m (26,575 ft), roughly below the site of Irvine's ice axe discovered in 1933 near the Northeast Ridge. Wang was killed in an avalanche the next day before he could provide additional details.

In 1999, Conrad Anker of the Mallory and Irvine Research Expedition found Mallory's body in the predicted search area near the old Chinese bivouac. There are opposing views within the mountaineering community as to whether the duo may have reached the summit 29 years before the first documented successful ascent by Sir Edmund Hillary and Tenzing Norgay in 1953. Many theories regarding the success of Mallory and Irvine's summit assault exist.

One theory amongst those supporting a successful summit push has Mallory overcoming the difficulty of the sheer face of the Second Step by standing on Irvine's shoulders. Armed with Irvine's remaining 3/4-full oxygen tank, he could conceivably have reached the summit late in the day, but this would have meant that Irvine would have had to descend by himself. However, rope-jerk injuries around Mallory's waist must mean the two were roped when they fell from below the First Step. Others suggest based on subsequent free climbs that Mallory would have been able to free climb the step. Chinese climber Xu Jing told Eric Simonson and Jochen Hemmleb in 2001 that he recalled spotting a corpse somewhere in the Yellow Band when he climbed Everest in the 1960s. One researcher claimed to have finally spotted Irvine's body using microscopic examination of aerial photographs. This possible discovery set off a new round of search expeditions in 2010 and 2011. Irvine's foot was found in the Central Rongbuk Glacier in 2024.

=== 1933 ===
A major expedition, under the leadership of Hugh Ruttledge, set out to climb with the great expectations that this time they would succeed. Oxygen was taken but not used because of the incorrect but lingering belief that it was of little benefit to a properly acclimated climber. After delays caused by poor weather and illness of team members, a much higher assault camp was placed than in 1924. On the first summit attempt, Lawrence Wager and Percy Wyn-Harris intended to follow the Northeastern ridge, but were unable to regain it, having bypassed (rather than climb over) the First Step, which they reached at 7:00 am. The direct access to the Second Step from the First involves a treacherous traverse. Instead of taking it, they dropped down to follow the lower, easier traverse pioneered by Norton in 1924. Observing the Second Step from 30.5 metres (100 ft) below it, Wyn-Harris declared it "unclimbable." Shortly after crossing the Great Couloir, they turned back for poor snow conditions and the lateness of the hour. A subsequent attempt by Eric Shipton and Frank Smythe followed the same route but Smythe, who pressed on alone when Shipton turned back because of illness, got no higher.

Lucy, Lady Houston, a British millionaire former showgirl, funded the Houston Everest Flight of 1933, which saw a formation of airplanes led by the Marquess of Clydesdale fly over the summit in an effort to photograph the unknown terrain.

=== 1934 ===
- (United Kingdom) Maurice Wilson, a British eccentric, stated his intention to summit Everest by himself. After only a few flying lessons, Wilson flew illegally from Britain to India, hiking through Darjeeling and into Tibet and with the help of Sherpa guides began his attempt. Wilson was not a climber and had no climbing equipment. He expected to transport himself to the summit with spiritual help and signal the monks at the Rongbuk monastery of his success with a shaving mirror. It is not believed he attained the North Col (7000 m). Maurice Wilson's body and his diary were found wrapped in a tent in 1935 by another British expedition. Although dumped into a crevasse below the North Col, his body has been rediscovered a number of times, including in 1960 by the Chinese expedition. Unlike Mallory's body, Wilson's has decayed because the temperature at the head of the East Rongbuk Glacier does rise above freezing.

=== 1935 ===
- (United Kingdom) (British Raj) Shipton led a small reconnaissance expedition during the monsoon season in preparation for the following year's expedition. The team climbed smaller peaks in the vicinity of Everest, and examined alternative possible routes on the mountain, including the West Ridge, and entry into the Western Cwm via Lho La. Both were dismissed as impractical, though Shipton did decide that an ascent from the Western Cwm would be possible if entry from the Nepalese side could be made. This would be the route by which the mountain would eventually be climbed in 1953. The expedition is also notable as the first visit to Everest for Tenzing Norgay, who was engaged as one of the 'porters'.

=== 1936 ===
- (United Kingdom) Ruttledge's second expedition achieved little because of a very early monsoon.

=== 1938 ===
- (United Kingdom) After taking part in the 1935 reconnaissance expedition, the prolific British mountaineering explorer Bill Tilman was appointed leader of the 1938 Everest expedition which attempted the ascent via the North Col but making an attempt from the west, from the main Rongbuk Glacier, as well as from the East Rongbuk. The North Col was reached from the west for the first time and the team went on to over 8,290 m (27,200 ft) without supplemental oxygen before being forced down by bad weather and sickness.

=== 1947 ===
- In March 1947, a Canadian engineer named Earl Denman, Norgay, and Ang Dawa Sherpa entered Tibet illegally to attempt the mountain; the attempt ended when a strong storm at 6,700 m (22,000 ft) pounded them. Denman admitted defeat and all three turned around and safely returned.

=== 1950 ===
- (United Kingdom) (United States) Nepal opened its borders to foreigners. Earlier expeditions had attempted the mountain from Tibet, via the north face. However, this access was closed to western expeditions in 1950, after the Chinese took control over Tibet.

In 1950, Bill Tilman and a small party which included Charles Houston, Oscar Houston, and Betsy Cowles undertook an exploratory expedition to Everest through Nepal along the route which has now become the standard approach to Everest from the south.

=== 1951 ===
- (United Kingdom) A British expedition led by Shipton, and including Edmund Hillary, Tom Bourdillon, W. H. Murray, and Mike Ward travelled into Nepal to survey a new route via the southern face. On September 30 at 6,100 m (20,000 ft) on Pumori, Shipton and Hillary saw the whole of the Western Cwm and concluded that ascent was possible from the top of the Cwm to the west face of Lhotse followed by a traverse to the South Col. They spent the next month attempting to reach the Western Cwm through the Khumbu Icefall but were stopped just short of success when an insurmountable crevasse (30-to-90 m (100-to-300 ft) wide) blocked further progress near the top of the icefall. Murray wrote: "We were defeated".
- (Denmark) Klaus Becker-Larsen along with two Sherpas attempted the North col but turned back because of rockfall. He had no mountaineering experience and minimal equipment. First European to reach Nangpa La.

=== 1952 ===
- (Switzerland) (India) (Nepal) A Swiss expedition led by Edouard Wyss-Dunant attempted to climb via the South Col and the southeast ridge. After five days of effort, the team found a route through the icefall; they got past the crevasse that stymied the 1951 expedition by first descending 20 m (60 ft) into it to a snow bridge and then used a precarious rope bridge to reach the other side. They were the first people to stand in the Western Cwm. On May 27, four climbers (Raymond Lambert, Tenzing Norgay, Rene Aubert, and Leon Flory) started from their tents on the South Col, two teams of Lambert/Tenzing and Aubert/Flory. Lambert/Tenzing reached Camp VII first at 8,400 m (27,500 ft) followed by Aubert/Flory. The tent was too small for both teams and Aubert/Flory decided to return to the South Col. The team had only undergone the ascent for reconnaissance and so only one tent and a bit of food had been taken. On May 28 in unsettled weather, the final assault team of Lambert and Tenzing turned back 150 metres (500 ft) short of the south summit.
- (Switzerland) (India) (Nepal) The Swiss attempted another expedition in the autumn of 1952 under the lead of Gabriel Chevalley. Besides Chevalley, the team included again Lambert and Tenzing from the spring expedition, as well as five new climbers. In late November, the team was stopped by bad weather after reaching an altitude of 8,100 metres (26,600 ft).
- Several Western climbing journals reported that the Soviet Union had launched an attempt from Tibet in October with the aim of reaching the summit before the following year's British expedition. The alleged expedition, apparently led by Pavel Datschnolian, was said to have been a disaster, resulting in the deaths of Datschnolian and five other men. Both Russian and Chinese authorities have consistently denied that such an attempt took place; no physical evidence has ever been found to confirm its existence, nor is there any record of a person named Pavel Datschnolian.

=== 1953: Edmund Hillary and Tenzing Norgay ===
- (United Kingdom) (New Zealand) (India) In 1953, a ninth British expedition, led by John Hunt and organized and financed by the Joint Himalayan Committee, returned to Nepal. Hunt planned for three assaults of two climbers each, including "a third and last attempt" if necessary after a delay of some days. After Wilfrid Noyce and Annullu had forced a passage to the South Col, two climbing pairs previously selected by Hunt attempted to reach the summit. The first pair, Charles Evans and Tom Bourdillon, using closed-circuit oxygen sets achieved the first ascent of the 8,750 m (28,700 ft) South Summit, within as little as 100 m (300 ft) of the final summit, but could go no further because of oxygen equipment problems and lack of time. Two days later, the second assault was made with the fittest and most determined climbing pair. Using conventional open-circuit oxygen sets, the summit was eventually reached at 11:30 am local time on May 29, 1953, by the New Zealander Edmund Hillary and Tenzing Norgay, a Nepali, climbing the South Col route. They paused at the summit to take photographs, Hillary saying after ten minutes taking photographs on the summit without his oxygen set on that he "was becoming rather clumsy-fingered and slow-moving". They buried a few sweets and a small cross in the snow before descending. Although they characterized it as the culmination of a team effort by the whole expedition, there was intense public speculation as to which of the pair had set foot on the summit first. In 1955 Tenzing disclosed in his autobiography that it was Hillary. News of the expedition's success reached London on the morning of Queen Elizabeth II's coronation. Times reporter James Morris sent a coded message by runner to Namche Bazaar, where a wireless transmitter was used to relay the message to London. The conquest of Everest was probably the last major news item to be delivered to the world by runner. Returning to Kathmandu a few days later, Hillary and Hunt discovered that they had been knighted for their efforts.

=== 1954 and 1955: French and Swiss Expeditions (proposed) ===
- (France) (Switzerland) The French had permission for a 1954 Everest expedition if the 1953 British expedition did not reach the summit, and the Swiss had permission for a 1955 or 1956 Everest expedition.

=== 1956: Swiss Expedition ===
- (Switzerland) The Swiss expedition of 1956 put the next four climbers on the top of Everest. The expedition made the first ascent of Lhotse (fourth highest) when Ernst Reiss and Fritz Luchsinger reached the top of Lhotse on May 18. The expedition set up camp 6 on the South Col and camp 7 at 8,400 metres (27,600 ft). On May 23, Ernst Schmied and Jürg Marmet reached the summit of Everest followed by Dölf Reist and Hansruedi von Gunten on May 24.

=== 1960: The North Ridge ===
- (China) On May 25, a Chinese team consisting of Wang Fuzhou, Qu Yinhua, and a Tibetan, Gongbu (Konbu), claimed to have reached the summit via the North Ridge. Owing to the lack of photographic evidence, the Chinese claim was discounted in mountaineering circles. However, subsequent research and interviews have persuaded many experts that the Chinese did indeed climb Everest from the north in 1960.

=== 1962 ===
- (United States) Woodrow Wilson Sayre and three colleagues made an illegal incursion into China from Nepal and reached about 7,620 metres (25,000 ft) on the North Ridge before turning back from exhaustion. The attempt was documented in a book by Sayre entitled Four Against Everest.

=== 1963 ===
- (United States) (India) (Nepal) First ascent by an American: Jim Whittaker, accompanied by Nawang Gombu Sherpa who, in 1965, became the first man to climb Everest twice; first ascent via the Hornbein Couloir on May 22 by Americans Tom Hornbein and Willi Unsoeld. Hornbein and Unsoeld descended by the South Col, making the ascent the first traverse of Everest.

=== 1965 ===
- (India) (Nepal) On May 20, a 21-man Indian expedition, led by Lieutenant Commander Captain M S Kohli, succeeded in putting nine men on the summit. Nawang Gombu became the first person to reach the summit twice, firstly with an American expedition in 1963.

=== 1969 ===
- (Japan) Two reconnaissance expeditions were undertaken in preparation for the summit expedition of 1970. Their primary objective was to scout the yet unclimbed southwestern face. On October 31, after establishing several camps on the southwestern face, a maximum elevation of 8,000 metres (26,000 ft) was reached.

=== 1970 ===
- (Japan) On May 6, Yuichiro Miura skied from the South Col of Everest. The documentary of his feat The Man Who Skied Down Everest was the first sports film to win an Academy Award for Best Documentary Feature. (see 2003 and 2008)
- (Japan) A separate Japanese team attempted but failed to establish a new summit route along the Southwest Face. Six Sherpa members of the team were killed in an avalanche, a porter was killed by a serac icefall, and climber Kiyoshi Narita died from a heart attack.

=== 1971 ===
- International expedition
- (Argentina)

=== 1972 ===
- European Expedition
- (United Kingdom)

=== 1973 ===
- (Italy)
- (Japan) October 26 – First post-monsoon ascent by Hisahi Ishiguro and Yasuo Kato.

=== 1974 ===
- (Spain) 1974 Tximist expedition
- (France) 1974 French Mount Everest expedition (September, post-monsoon)

=== 1975 ===
- On May 16, Junko Tabei of Japan became the first woman on the summit. Tabei was one of seven Japanese climbers injured in an avalanche at Camp II on May 4. Tabei and her climbing partner, Sherpa Ang Tshering I, were the 38th/39th unique individuals to complete the ascent. In 1992, Tabei became the first woman to complete the Seven Summits.
- (China) On May 27, nine members from a Chinese team reached the summit. The team fixed a ladder at the Second Step, the major obstacle on the North Ridge route, which continued to be in use until 2008. Phanthog became the first woman to ascend from the Tibetan side. In the expedition, the summit's altitude was measured as 8,848.13 metres (29,029.3 ft).
- (United Kingdom) 1975 British Mount Everest Southwest Face expedition - On September 24, a British expedition led by Chris Bonington achieved the first ascent of the Southwest Face. Summiteers Doug Scott and Dougal Haston made the first ascent by British citizens. A band of cliffs on the southwest face, known as the Rock Band, had defeated five previous expeditions between 1969 and 1973. On September 20, Nick Estcourt and Paul Braithwaite achieved the first ascent of the Rock Band. The summit was reached by two teams: first on September 24 by Scott and Haston, who survived the highest ever bivouac when they were benighted on the South Summit during their descent. On September 26 four more climbers attempted a second ascent. Peter Boardman and Sirdar Pertemba Sherpa were successful, but BBC cameraman Mick Burke, climbing alone after Martin Boysen turned back, failed to return from the summit.

=== 1976 ===
- (United Kingdom) British and Nepalese Army Expedition to Everest - 16 May an expedition by the British Army and Royal Nepalese Army which was under the command of Tony Streather - the summiteers were Special Air Service soldiers Bronco Lane and Brummie Stokes who ascended up the South West face.
- (United States) On October 8, 1976, as part of the American Bicentennial Everest Expedition, Bob Cormack and Chris Chandler reached the summit via the South Col Route.

=== 1978 ===
- On 8 May 1978, Reinhold Messner (Italy) and Peter Habeler (Austria) reached the summit, the first climbers to do so without the use of supplemental oxygen. They used the southeast ridge route.
- (Poland) 1978 Franco-German expedition led by Karl Herrligkoffer, fifteen people reached the summit, at that time this was a record number for one expedition. October 16, 1978, Wanda Rutkiewicz, a Polish mountaineer who was a member of Herrligkoffer's expedition, became the third woman, the first Pole and the first European woman to reach the summit of Mount Everest.

=== 1979 ===
- (Socialist Federal Republic of Yugoslavia) Yugoslav West Ridge expedition, new route up the complete West Ridge from Lho La. Summit reached by two teams made up of Andrej Štremfelj and Nejc Zaplotnik (May 13, 1979), and then two days later by Stipe Božić, Stane Belak, and Ang Phu (Sherpa). Stane Belak, Ang Phu, and Stipe Božić bivouacked at 8,400 metres (27,600 ft). The next day, Ang Phu fell on the way down and died.
- (West Germany) German expedition, called the 1979 Swabian Expedition; death of Ray Genet and Hannelore Schmatz.

=== 1980: First winter ascent ===
- February 17 – First winter ascent by Andrzej Zawada's team from Poland: Leszek Cichy and Krzysztof Wielicki. This was also the first winter summit of any of the world's fourteen 8000 metre peaks.
- (Poland) May 19 – New climbing route on the south face by Poles Andrzej Czok and Jerzy Kukuczka.
- (Italy) August 20 – Reinhold Messner became the first to climb Everest solo and without oxygen tanks. He pioneered a new route on the north col/face, roughly continuing Finch's climb in 1922. He traveled the Northwest route for three days entirely alone from his base camp at 6,500 metres (21,300 ft).
- (Japan) Takashi Ozaki and Tsuneo Shigehiro become the first to make a full ascent of the North Face.
- (Spain) (Basque Country (autonomous community)) 1980 Everest Basque Expedition. First successful ascent to Everest for a Basque expedition.

=== 1982 ===
- (Soviet Union) The first acknowledged Soviet expedition climbed a new route on the Southwest Face to the left of the Central Gully. Eleven climbers reached the summit, and the route was recognized as technically the hardest route yet climbed on Everest.
- (United Kingdom) A small British expedition led by Bonington made the first attempt to climb the full length of the northeast ridge (the Chinese route gained the ridge at a high point via the north face). The summit was not reached, and Peter Boardman and Joe Tasker disappeared while making a final attempt to climb the Three Pinnacles at over 8000 m.
- (Canada) One of the best planned, equipped, and financed attempts took place in October when the 1982 Canadian Mount Everest Expedition arrived. Tragedy struck early; after the expedition's cameraman died in an icefall and three Sherpas died soon after in an avalanche, six of the Canadian team members quit. One of the remaining members, Laurie Skreslet along with two Sherpas, made it to the top on October 5, becoming the first Canadian to reach the summit; two days later, Pat Morrow became the second Canadian to do the same.
- (United States) May 15 – Marty Hoey fell to her death from the North Side. Hoey was widely expected to become the first American woman to summit Everest, which did not occur for another six years (see September 29, 1988).
- (Japan) December 27 – Everest veteran Yasuo Kato made the second winter ascent and became the first climber to summit Everest in three different seasons. He climbed alone from the South Summit. On his descent, he and his climbing companion Toshiaki Kobayashi bivouacked below the south summit. They failed to return in bad weather.

=== 1983 ===
- (United States) October 8 – Lou Reichardt, Kim Momb, and Carlos Buhler became the first to summit the East Face. The next day, Dan Reid, George Lowe, and Jay Cassell reached the summit.

=== 1984 ===
- (Bulgaria) April 20 – Bulgarian Hristo Prodanov reached the summit via the West Ridge, alone and without oxygen, and died on the way back, becoming the first Bulgarian who summited Mount Everest and the second to summit via the West Ridge. On May 8–9, another four members, Metodi Savov and Ivan Valchev, on May 8; Nikolay Petkov and Kiril Doskov on May 9, reached the summit via the West Ridge route and descended the South Col route, doing the second ever traverse of Everest, and the first complete - two of the ridges of the mountain.
- (India) May 23 – Bachendri Pal via the standard southeast ridge route, becoming the first Indian woman to do so.
- (Australia) October 3 – First Australian ascent, without supplemental oxygen, on a new route ("White Limbo") on the North Face. Tim Macartney-Snape and Greg Mortimer summited.
- (United States) October 20 – Phil Ershler became the first American to summit Everest's North Face.
- (Czechoslovakia) October 15 – First Slovak & Czechoslovak ascent. Zoltán Demján and Jozef Psotka summited without supplemental oxygen, climbing a new route variant over the South Pillar. Psotka died on the descent.

=== 1985 ===
- (Norway) (United Kingdom) Norwegian expedition led by Arne Næss Jr. Bjørn Myrer Lund, Odd Eliassen and Chris Bonington reached the summit on 21 April 1985, with Arne Næss Jr., Ralph Høibakk, Håvard Nesheim and Stein Peter Aasheim, together with several sherpas, summiting a couple of days later.
- (Spain) (Catalonia) August 28 - First Catalan ascent, without supplemental oxygen, along the northeast ridge by Òscar Cadiach, Antoni Sors and Carles Vallès.

=== 1986 ===
- (Switzerland) Erhard Loretan and Jean Troillet climbed the North Face in a single push without oxygen, ropes, or tents in 42 hours, then glissaded down in under five hours. They climbed mostly at night and carried no backpacks above 8000 m, a style that became known as "night naked".
- (Canada) Sharon Wood becomes the first North American (Canadian) woman to summit, on May 20 with Dwayne Congdon.

=== 1988 ===
- Jean-Marc Boivin of France makes the first paraglider descent of the mountain. Boivin's 11–12 minute, 2,948 m (9,700 ft) descent to Camp II holds the altitude record for start of a paraglider flight.
- (France) Marc Batard completed the southeast route ascent without supplementary oxygen in the record time of 22 hours and 30 minutes from Base Camp to summit.
- On May 5, a joint team from China, Japan, and Nepal reached the top from the north and the south simultaneously and crossed over to descend from the opposite sides. This event was broadcast live worldwide.
- (United States) September 29 – Stacy Allison became the first American woman atop Everest.
- 16 October – Lydia Bradey, New Zealand, became the first woman to climb Everest without oxygen, via the SE ridge, climbing alone. Initially two of her teammates (who were not at base Camp at the time) disputed her claim but since then the ascent has been recognised by several governments and the Himalayan Data Base (Nepal).
- (Czechoslovakia) 17 October – Jozef Just, Slovakia, became the first and only climber to climb Bonington's SW Face route without oxygen, after reaching South Summit with teammates Dušan Becík, Peter Božík and Jaroslav Jaško. Team was exhausted after last bivouac under South Summit and Just went to summit Everest solo, while other three began to descend towards South Col. After rejoining and their last radio contact with base camp they disappeared in a strong storm and their bodies had never been found. Slovak expedition had two main objectives – to summit Lhotse and repeat British route – so Just and Becík also summited Lhotse 19 days before tragedy.
- (Nepal) On 10 May 1988, Sungdare Sherpa became the first person to summit Everest five times. Sungdare first summited on 2 October 1979.
- (United States) (Canada) (United Kingdom) On 12 May 1988, Stephen Venables became the first Briton to summit Everest without oxygen, alone. Team leader Robert Anderson and Ed Webster reached the South Summit. All three, with Paul Teare, had climbed a new route up the Kangshung Face to the South Col, with no oxygen and no high altitude porters.
- (Australia) In 1988, Jon Muir became the first Australian to reach the summit without a sherpa.

=== 1989 ===
- (Socialist Federal Republic of Yugoslavia) May 10 Yugoslav expedition. Southeast Ridge. Stipe Božić, Viki Grošelj, Dimitar Ilievski-Murato, and Sherpas Sonam and Agiva all reached the summit. Ilievski-Murato failed to return.
- (Mexico) (Nepal) May 16 – Ricardo Torres-Nava and two Sherpas, Ang Lhakpa and Dorje, got to the mountaintop with supplementary oxygen in an American expedition. Torres-Nava become the first Mexican and Latin American to do so.
- (Mexico) July 18 – Carlos Carsolio reached the summit without bottled oxygen. This would be his fifth eight-thousander of fourteen.

=== 1990 ===
- (Socialist Federal Republic of Yugoslavia) On October 7, Marija and Andrej Štremfelj became the first married couple to reach the summit. Marija Štremfelj was the first Yugoslav woman to reach the summit.
- (New Zealand) Peter Hillary, Edmund Hillary's son, became the first offspring of a summiteer to reach the summit.
- (Australia) Tim Macartney-Snape became the first person to walk and climb from sea level to the top of Mount Everest (his second ascent of the peak). Macartney-Snape began his approximately 1,200 km (750 mi) "Sea to Summit" expedition three months earlier, on foot, on Sagar Island in the Bay of Bengal.

=== 1992 ===
- (Chile) Two rival Chilean expeditions; one led by Rodrigo Jordan climbing the second ever ascent through the Kangshung, and the other led by Mauricio Purto became the first South Americans to reach the summit. The first Chilean and South American climber to set foot on the summit was Cristian Garcia-Huidobro at 10:25 on May 15, who is claimed to have insulted and mocked the rival team's leader, Purto, as he reached the summit on the second place. Supposedly a member of Purto's team pushed Garcia-Huidobro enticing him to fight, if this quarrel ever took place it has the dubious honour of being the highest brawl in the world.

=== 1993 ===
- (Nepal) April 22 – First ascent by a Nepali woman, Pasang Lhamu Sherpa. She died while descending.
- October 7 – Ramón Blanco of Spain/Venezuela became the oldest person to reach the summit aged 60 years, 160 days.
- May 10 – Santosh Yadav of India became the first woman to climb Mount Everest twice within a year (May 1992 and May 1993).

=== 1995 ===
- (Brazil) May 14 – First ascent by a Brazilian, Waldemar Niclevicz and Mozart Catão. Niclevicz summited again in 2005.
- (United Kingdom) Alison Hargreaves became the first woman (and second person after Reinhold Messner) to climb Everest alone without oxygen tanks or support from a Sherpa team.
- (Romania) Constantin Lacatusu First Romanian ascent, finished without artificial oxygen (used from top camp to 2-nd Step), 17.05.1995.
- (Japan) Nihon University climbers Kiyoshi Furuno and Shigeki Imoto become the first to summit along the full Northeast Ridge, the last remaining unclimbed route.

=== 1996 ===
In 1996, fifteen people died trying to reach the summit, making it the deadliest year in Everest history. On May 10, a storm stranded several climbers between the summit and the safety of Camp IV, killing Rob Hall, Scott Fischer, Yasuko Namba, Doug Hansen, and guide Andy Harris on the south and the Indian (Ladakhi) climbers Tsewang Paljor, Dorje Morup, Tsewang Smanla on the north. Hall and Fischer were both highly experienced climbers who were leading paid expeditions to the summit.

Journalist Jon Krakauer, on assignment from Outside magazine, was in Hall's party. He published the bestseller Into Thin Air about the experience. Anatoli Boukreev, a guide who felt impugned by Krakauer's book, co-authored a rebuttal book called The Climb. The dispute sparked a large debate within the climbing community. In May 2004, Kent Moore, a physicist, and John L. Semple, a surgeon, both researchers from the University of Toronto, told New Scientist magazine that an analysis of weather conditions on that day suggested that freak weather caused oxygen levels to plunge approximately 14%.

During the same season, climber and filmmaker David Breashears and his team filmed the IMAX feature Everest on the mountain (some climbing scenes were later recreated for the film in British Columbia, Canada). The 70 mm IMAX camera was specially modified to be lightweight enough to carry up the mountain, and to function in the extreme cold with the use of particular greases on the mechanical parts, plastic bearings and special batteries. Production was halted as Breashears and his team assisted the survivors of the May 10 disaster, but the team eventually reached the top on May 23 and filmed the first large format footage of the summit. On Breashears' team was Jamling Tenzing Norgay, the son of Norgay, following in his father's footsteps for the first time. Also on his team was Ed Viesturs of Seattle, WA, who summited without the use of supplemental oxygen, and Araceli Segarra, who became the first woman from Spain to summit Everest.

The storm's impact on climbers on the mountain's other side, the North Ridge, where several climbers also died, was detailed in a first hand account by British filmmaker and writer Matt Dickinson in his book The Other Side of Everest.

- (Nepal) Sherpa Ang Rita was the first person to summit ten times, between 7 May 1983 through 23 May 1996.
- (Italy) Hans Kammerlander climbed the mountain from the north side in the record ascent time of 17 hours from base camp to the summit. He climbed alone without supplementary oxygen and skied down from 7,800 metres.
- Göran Kropp of Sweden became the first person to ride his bicycle all the way from his home in Sweden to the mountain, scale it alone without the use of oxygen tanks, and bicycle most of the way back.
- (Denmark) Lene Gammelgaard became the first Scandinavian woman to summit Mount Everest, reaching the summit via the South East Ridge on 10 May 1996, as part of Scott Fischer's tragic expedition.

=== 1998 ===
- (United States) (United Kingdom) Naturalized American and British born Tom Whittaker, whose right foot had been amputated, became the first disabled person to successfully reach the summit.
- (Nepal) Kazi Sherpa became the fastest to summit via southeast ridge (South Col), without supplemental oxygen. Kazi took 20 hours 24 minutes from basecamp to the summit, alone, unsupported, drug-unaided (Diamox not used); thereby breaking Marc Batard's previous record from 1988 by 2 hours 5 minutes.
- (United Kingdom) Bear Grylls on 16 May; at 23 one of the youngest Britons to summit.
- Ristam Radjapov and 11 alpinists including a woman Svetlana Baskakova from Uzbekistan first climbed Everest in 1998, then Ilyas Tukhvatullin and Andrey Zaikin climbed to the summit.

=== 1999 ===
- Babu Chiri Sherpa of Nepal stayed for 21 hours on the mountaintop.
- (South Africa) Cathy O'Dowd became the first woman to reach summit from northern and southern routes.
- (Mexico) May 5 – Elsa Ávila became the first Mexican and Latin American woman to summit.
- (Japan) May 13 – Japanese Ken Noguchi's summited, making him the youngest to reach the highest peaks on all seven continents at 25 years 265 days old.
- (Portugal) May 18 – João Garcia became the first Portuguese to climb Mount Everest.
- (Ecuador) May 25 – Iván Vallejo became the first Ecuadorian to reach the top without bottled oxygen. It would be his third eight-thousander of his fourteen.
- (Georgia (country)) May 26 – Mamuka Tsikhiseli from Georgia climbed from the Tibet side at 11:32 am local time.
- (Georgia (country)) May 12 – Lev Sarkisov from Georgia became the oldest person to reach the summit aged 60 years, 160 days.
- (Greece) Constantine Niarchos, billionaire's Stavros Niarchos son, became the first Greek to summit Mount Everest.
- (United Kingdom) (United States) (Germany) On the north side of the mountain, as part of Eric Simonson and Jochen Hemmleb's search expedition, on 1 May, Conrad Anker discovered the body of George Mallory at 8,165 m, roughly below the ice axe discovered on the North East Ridge in 1933. No camera was found. Rope-jerk mottling around Mallory's waist suggest he was roped to Irvine during that—or a previous fall.

=== 2000 ===
- On May 17 Nazir Sabir from Pakistan reached the highest summit at 7:30 am, becoming the first Pakistani to summit.
- On May 17 Frits Vrijlandt from Netherlands reached the top at 11:20 am, becoming the first Dutch to summit via the North side.
- On October 7 Davo Karničar from Slovenia became the first man to accomplish an uninterrupted ski descent from the top to the base camp in five hours. Karnicar reached speeds of 120 km/h (75 mph). (While Japanese climber and skier Yuichiro Miura is known for his 6 May 1970 feat as The Man Who Skied Down Everest, his 1,280-metre (4,199 ft) descent on skis began from Everest's 7,906-metre (25,938 ft) South Col.)
- Anna Czerwińska from Poland became the oldest woman to Summit Mount Everest (at the time) at the age of 50 (born on 7 July 1949, climbed Everest from the Nepal side on 22 May 2000).
- (Spain) (Andalusia) On May 22, at 9:30 in the morning, Manuel González from Málaga and Iván Jara from Sevilla, became the first mountaineer from Andalucia to reach the summit. They were also accompanied by cameraman Juanjo Garra.

=== 2001 ===
- (Nepal) On May 23, at 16 years and 14 days, Temba Tsheri Sherpa became the youngest person to reach the summit.
- On May 24, 22-year-old Marco Siffredi of France became the first person to descend on a snowboard.
- (United States) On May 25, 32-year-old Erik Weihenmayer, of Boulder, Colorado, became the first blind person to reach the summit.
- 64-year-old Sherman Bull, of New Canaan, Connecticut, became the oldest person to reach the summit.
- (Colombia) Manuel Arturo Barrios and Fernando González-Rubio became the first Colombians to reach the summit.
- 19 people made it to the summit, surpassing the previous record of 10 people.

=== 2002 ===
- (Russia) Expedition by Ural Mountaineering from Yekaterinburg led by Gennady Kirievskiy summited Everest via the North side. All 9 members summited on 18 May 2002.
- (Japan) Tamae Watanabe summits at the age of 63 years and 177 days on 16 May, the oldest woman to do so until she sets the record again in 2012.
- (United States) Phil and Susan Ershler first couple to climb the Seven Summits after reaching the Everest summit on May 16, 2002.

=== 2003 ===
- (United States) Dick Bass, the first American to climb the Seven Summits, and who first reached the summit in 1985 at 55 years old, returned to attempt to reclaim his title at age 73, but he made it to base camp only. Bass's teammates included Jim Wickwire and John Roskelley.
- The Outdoor Life Network staged a high-profile survivor style show on which the winners got the chance to climb Everest. Conrad Anker and David Breashears were commentators on this expedition.
- (Japan) Yuichiro Miura became the oldest person to reach the summit at 70 years and 222 days (on May 22).
- (Nepal) Twenty-five-year-old Nepalese Sherpa Pemba Dorje made the world's fastest ascent in 12 hours 45 minutes on May 23.
- (Nepal) Three days later, Lhakpa Gelu broke this record with 10 hours 56 minutes. After a short dispute with Pemba Dorje, the tourism ministry confirmed Gelu's record in July.
- (Nepal) Ming Kipa, 15, became the youngest woman to climb Everest (also becoming the youngest person from 2003 to 2010).

=== 2004 ===
- Pemba Dorje Sherpa's claimed the fastest oxygen-supported ascent over the southeast ridge (South Col), taking 8 hours 10 minutes for the 17 km (11 mi) route from base camp to the summit. There was little evidence for Pemba's record-claim, and it was subject to an unprecedented dispute involving the previous record holder Lhakpa Gelu and renowned Mt Everest chronicler Elizabeth Hawley, other mountaineers in Nepal. In 2017, Pemba Dorje's record was officially revoked by the Supreme Court of Nepal, citing lack of evidence.
- (Russia) A 13-man Russian expedition led by Victor Kozlov climbed Everest via the North Face, team members summited between May 29 and June 1, 2004.
- (Greece) First Greek expedition, led 5 climbers to the summit from the South side and 3 from the North.

=== 2005 ===
- (China) A Chinese government-sponsored survey team with 24 members reached the peak on May 22 to anchor surveying equipment for the remeasurement of summit height. Several methods were used to assess snow and ice thickness for the new measurement and to compare it with historical data.
- (France) On May 14, a Eurocopter AS-350 B3 helicopter flew and landed on the summit for the first time, repeating the feat the next day.
- The first couple married on top of the Everest was Mr. Pem Dorjee Sherpa and Ms. Moni Mulepati from Nepal on May 30, 2005. Both were part of the Rotary Centennial Everest Expedition.

=== 2006 ===
- (New Zealand) On May 15, the New Zealander Mark Inglis became the first person to reach the summit with two artificial legs.
- On May 15, sportsman Maxime Chaya was the first Lebanese to climb Mount Everest completing the Seven Summits challenge. On December 28, 2007, he also became the first from the Middle East to reach the South Pole on foot from the Antarctic coast after an unsupported and unassisted journey that lasted 47 days.
- (Japan) On May 17, 70-year-old Takao Arayama reached the peak, becoming the oldest man by three days to reach the summit.
- (Philippines) On May 17, 32-year-old Leo Oracion became the first Filipino to reach the summit. He was part of the First Philippine Mount Everest Expedition along with fellow mountaineer Erwin "Pastor" Emata, who reached the summit the following day, May 18. The expedition was supported by TV network ABS-CBN. Another Filipino, Romi Garduce reached the summit on May 19. He was financed and supported by TV network GMA 7. Dale Abenojar, another Filipino mountaineer who made an independent summit attempt, claimed to have reached the summit on May 15—two days ahead of Oracion—from the northern side. Abenojar's claim has been registered in Elizabeth Hawley's Himalayan Database but the claim remains dubious.
- (United Kingdom) On May 18 at 7.45am, Tom and Ben Clowes, became the first British Brothers to stand on the summit together having climbed from the southern side in Nepal.
- On May 19, Apa Sherpa of Thame, Nepal summited for the 16th time, breaking his own world record.
- (United States) Also on May 19, Sophia Danenberg became the first black American and the first black woman to reach the summit.
- (United Kingdom) Pauline Sanderson became the first person to complete a self-propelled ascent of Mount Everest, the highest point on the earth's surface, starting from the Dead Sea, at −423 metres (−1,388 ft) the lowest point on the earth's surface. Sanderson began her approximately 8,000 km (5,000 mi) "EverestMax" expedition six months earlier, by bicycle, from the shore of the Dead Sea in Jordan. (Sanderson's husband, Phil, joined her for the final ascent, making them the first married British couple to summit Everest together.)

=== 2007 ===
- (Nepal) On May 16, Apa Sherpa climbed Everest for the 17th time, breaking his own record.
- (India) On 15 and 16 May, 25 members, including 13 sherpas, of the Indian Army Everest Expedition 2007, scaled Mount Everest. This was the fourth expedition by the Indian Army to Everest; but the first from Tibet side.
- (Egypt) On May 17, Omar Samra became the first Egyptian and youngest Arab to reach the summit of Everest, at 7:19 EGP.
- (Japan) On May 22, Katsusuke Yanagisawa became the oldest person to reach the summit at 71 years and 61 days.
- (United Kingdom) On May 24, Kenton Cool reached the summit for the second time in a week.
- On May 17, first traverse by three women, Noelle Wenceslao, Carina Dayondon, and Janet Belarmino (Filipina) coming North Side, Tibet and going down in South Side, Nepal.
- (Austria) The fastest ascent via the northeast ridge was accomplished by Austrian climber Christian Stangl, who took 16 hours 42 minutes for the 10 km distance from Camp III (Advanced Base Camp) to the summit, just barely beating Italian Hans Kammerlander's record of 17 hours, accomplished in 1996. Both men climbed alone. In 2010, Stangl was proven, and later confessed to, having claimed a fraudulent summit-climb of K2 in 2010.

=== 2008 ===
- (Saudi Arabia) On May 21, Faruq Saad al-Zuman reached the summit of the Everest and became the first Saudi Arabian to climb Everest.
- (Nepal) On May 22, 2008, Apa Sherpa climbed Everest for the 18th time, again breaking his own record.
- (Japan) (Nepal) Yuichiro Miura reclaimed his title of oldest person to reach the summit at age 75 years and 227 days on May 26, but it was later established that the day before, Nepali Min Bahadur Sherchan, aged 76 years and 330 days had summited. Yuichiro Miura once again reclaimed his title of oldest to reach the summit on May 22, 2013, age 80.
- (India) On May 21, Kalpana Dash was the first Oriya mountaineer to scale Mount Everest.
- (Mexico) Axel Duhart Villavicencio becomes the fourth Mexican to summit Everest.
- (Canada) Laura Mallory Youngest Female Canadian to climb Mount Everest in May 2008 with her father and two brothers.

=== 2009 ===
- (Nepal) On May 16, Apa Sherpa climbed Everest for the 19th time, once again breaking his own record.
- On May 19, Darija Boštjančić and Iris Boštjančić became the first pair of sisters to simultaneously climb Everest, also making Croatia the only country in the world with more female than male summiteers.
- (South Korea) On May 20, Korean climbers Park Young-seok, Jin Jae-chang, Kang Ki-seok and Shin Dong-min reached the summit of Everest via a new route on the Southwest face (Park's Korean Route)
- (United Kingdom) Ranulph Fiennes on 20 May; aged 65y, the oldest Briton to summit (on his third attempt).

=== 2010 ===
- (United States) The youngest person to climb Mount Everest was 13-year-old Jordan Romero in May 2010 from the Tibetan side. His ascent, as part of an apparent "race" to bring younger and younger children to the mountain (shortly after Romero's ascent, Pemba Dorjie Sherpa announced plans to bring his 9-year-old son to the summit), triggered a wave of criticism that prompted Chinese authorities to establish age limits on Mount Everest. At the present time, China no longer grants permits to prospective climbers under 18 or over 60. Nepal sets the minimum age at 16 but has no maximum age. Romero later became the youngest person to climb the Seven Summits at 15 years old, 200 days.
- The oldest climber to reach the summit of Mount Everest from both sides (Nepal and Tibet) of the mountain is 60-year-old Julio Bird, a Puerto Rican cardiologist who reached the summit of Mount Everest from the north side on 17 May 2010.

=== 2011 ===
- (Japan) Takashi Ozaki, 58, dies of altitude sickness while attempting his third ascent.
- (Nepal) Apa Sherpa holds the record for reaching the summit more times than any other person, 21 times between 10 May 1990 and 11 May 2011. The record for a non-Sherpa is held by American climber and expedition guide Dave Hahn, reaching the summit 14 times between 19 May 1994 and 26 May 2012.
- (Palestine) Suzanne Al Houby became the first Arab and Palestinian woman to reach the summit of Everest on May 21

=== 2012 ===
- (Japan) Tamae Watanabe breaks her own record as the oldest female summiteer, on May 19 at age 73 years and 180 days. She reached the summit from the north side.

=== 2013 ===
- (United States) On April 1, Eli Reimer, 16, became the first teenager with Down syndrome to climb to Everest Base Camp. The expedition was organized to raise funds for Elisha Foundation, a non-profit that supports people living with disabilities.
- (Japan) Yuichiro Miura once again reclaimed his title of oldest to reach the summit on May 22, 2013, age 80.
- (Nepal) Phurba Tashi Sherpa equals Apa Sherpa's record of 21 summits of Mount Everest.
- (India) Arunima Sinha Became the first female amputee to scale Mount Everest on 21 May 2013.

=== 2014 ===
- 2014 Mount Everest avalanche kills sixteen people, making it the second worst Everest disaster in history. As a result, most expeditions from the Nepalese side for the year are canceled.
- (India) On May 25, Malavath Purna became the youngest woman to reach the summit at age 13 years and 11 months. She climbed from the north side.
- (Faroe Islands) On May 25, Arne Vatnhamar became the first Faroese to climb Mount Everest.

=== 2015 ===
- April 2015 Nepal earthquake triggered an avalanche on Mount Everest, killing at least 18 people at South Base Camp; an Indian Army mountaineering team reportedly recovered 18 bodies. Between 700 and 1,000 people were thought to be on the mountain at the time, with at least 61 injured and an unknown number missing or trapped at camps at higher altitudes.
- August 2015: Everest was reopened to climbers in August, but only one climbing permit was issued, to Japanese mountaineer Nobukazu Kuriki. He turned around 700m below the summit in October (in the autumn post-monsoon season). He had tried four times previously, losing all his fingers to frostbite.

=== 2020 ===
The Nepalese government announced on 13 March 2020 that it was suspending all climbing permits for Mount Everest and all other peaks in the country due to concern over the effects of the COVID-19 pandemic; the Chinese government had already closed its side of Everest.

On 3 April 2020 it was announced that more than two dozen Chinese climbers were tackling Mount Everest and were expected to reach the advanced base camp on Friday, although only Chinese climbers would be permitted in the spring season.

=== 2021 ===
The Chinese side of Everest remained closed to foreigners, however, the Nepalese government resumed issuing climbing permits (issuing a total of 408). Additionally, the Nepalese government imposed a limit on the number of climbers who could be on Everest at any one time, to prevent 'traffic jams' of climbers on the mountain.

During the season, there were several outbreaks of COVID-19 among climbers, compounded by the Nepalese Department of Tourism neglecting to establish any rules or regulations to mitigate the risk of outbreaks at the South Base Camp. Furthermore, the Nepalese government did not officially acknowledge any cases or outbreaks of COVID on Mount Everest, and there were prohibitions enforced about what climbers were allowed to take photographs of, prompting concerns about the Nepalese government attempting to cover up these problems.

In May 2021, citing concerns about COVID, the Chinese government announced plans to draw a 'separation line' at the peak of Everest, to prevent the spread of COVID from climbers whom ascended from the Nepalese side.

Over the 2021 season, a total of 534 people summited Everest (195 members, 339 sherpas), and four people died.

=== 2022 ===
Once again, the Chinese government prohibited foreign expeditions on the north face of Everest, and only permitted one commercial expedition and one scientific expedition to climb Everest, with the scientific expedition installing a series of weather stations on the north face of Everest. The Nepalese side remained open, with 325 climbing permits issued - a sharp decline from 2022, in spite of attempts to attract more foreign climbers, such as removing COVID testing requirements on arrival in Nepal for vaccinated travellers. Coincidentally, a new weather station was installed on the south face of Everest as well, at roughly the same altitude as the highest-altitude Chinese weather station, to replace another weather station on the Nepalese side which broke down in January 2020 - neither expedition was aware of each other until after the stations were installed.

Towards the end of the season, due to a stalled high-pressure system, conditions on Everest were better than usual, being warmer, drier, and less windy, facilitating a higher-than-usual summiting success rate of 70%.

Over the 2022 season, a total of 690 people summited Everest (640 from the south (240 members, 400 sherpas), 50 from the north), and three people died.

== Timeline of regional, national, ethnic, and gender records ==
=== 1975 ===
- On May 16, Junko Tabei of Japan became the first woman on the summit. Tabei was one of seven Japanese climbers injured in an avalanche at Camp II on May 4. Tabei and her climbing partner, Sherpa Ang Tshering I, were the 38th/39th unique individuals to complete the ascent. In 1992, Tabei became the first woman to complete the Seven Summits.
- (China) On May 27, a Tibetan woman, Phanthog, became the first woman to reach the summit from the Tibetan side. Tabei's team had used the South Col route.

=== 1977 ===
- (South Korea) On September 15, Ko Sang-Don (고상돈) became the first Korean to reach the summit.

=== 1978 ===
- (West Germany) On May 10, Reinhard Karl became the first German to reach the summit.
- (France) On October 15, Pierre Mazeaud, Jean Afanassieff, and Nicolas Jaeger became the first French to reach the summit.
- (Poland) On October 16, Wanda Rutkiewicz became the first Pole, the first European woman, and the third woman to reach the summit.

=== 1979 ===
- (Socialist Federal Republic of Yugoslavia) May 13 – Andrej Štremfelj and Nejc Zaplotnik became the first Yugoslavians—and the first from the region that later (1992) is recognized as the nation of Slovenia—to reach the summit, as well as the first to complete the West Ridge route.
- (Socialist Federal Republic of Yugoslavia) May 15 – Stipe Božić from the Yugoslavian expedition becomes the first from the region that later (1992) is recognized as the nation of Croatia to summit.

=== 1980 ===
- (Spain) May 14 – Martín Zabaleta became the first Spaniard to reach the summit.

=== 1982 ===
- (Canada) October 5 – Laurie Skreslet became the first Canadian to summit.

=== 1984 ===
- (Bulgaria) April 20 – Bulgarian Hristo Prodanov reached the summit via the West Ridge, alone and without oxygen, and died on the way back becoming the first Bulgarian to reach the summit.
- Bachendri Pal was the first woman from India and fifth woman overall to reach the summit. She was guided to the top by Ang Dorji, who climbed without oxygen. The Indian expedition of which she was a part rescued two stricken Bulgarian climbers descending from the West Ridge ascent.
- (Czechoslovakia) (Slovakia) Jozef Psotka, at the time the oldest person to reach the summit without oxygen, together with Zoltán Demján and Sherpa Ang Rita reached the summit on October 15. Psotka died during this expedition.
- (Netherlands) Bart Vos becomes the first Dutch to summit Everest.
- (Australia) Tim Macartney-Snape and Greg Mortimer become first the Australians to reach summit, climbing new route up the Great Couloir on the North Face – 'White Limbo'. Lincoln Hall stops at top camp. Andrew Henderson turns back just short of the summit.

=== 1985 ===
- (Norway) April 29 – Arne Næss Jr. becomes the first Norwegian to reach the summit.

=== 1986 ===
- Sharon Wood reaches the summit on May 20 thus becoming the first woman from North America and Canada to reach the top. Starting from the Rongbuk Glacier, her route went up to the West Shoulder of Everest and then followed the Hornbein Couloir to the summit.

=== 1988 ===
- (United Kingdom) Stephen Venables became the first Briton to ascend the peak without use of oxygen. He pioneered a new route over the East Kangshung Face.
- (United States) September 29 – Stacy Allison becomes the first American woman atop Everest.

=== 1989 ===
- (Socialist Federal Republic of Yugoslavia) (North Macedonia) May 10 – Dimitar Ilievski-Murato became the first Macedonian to reach the summit.

=== 1990 ===
- (Sweden) On May 11, Mikael Reuterswärd and Oskar Kihlborg become the first Swedes to summit Everest.

=== 1992 ===
- (Belgium) (Israel) On May 12, Ingrid Baeyens became the first Belgian woman to reach the summit. Another member of the same climbing party, Doron Erel, became the first Israeli to reach the summit.
- (British Hong Kong) On May 12, Cham Yick Kai became the first Hong Konger to reach the summit.
- (Chile) On May 15, two Chilean expeditions reached the summit, also becoming the first South Americans to do so. One team made the second ever ascent via the Kangshung Face.
- (Luxembourg) Eugene Berger becomes the first Luxembourger to summit Mount Everest.
- (Peru) Augusto Ortega becomes the first Peruvian to summit Everest.

=== 1993 ===
- (Lithuania) Vladas Vitkauskas was the first Lithuanian to reach the summit.
- (Northern Ireland) Dawson Stelfox became the first Northern Irishman to reach the summit, and was the first UK citizen to ascend the north face.
- (Finland) Veikka Gustafsson became the first Finn to reach the summit.
- (Venezuela) On October 7, Ramón Blanco (Spanish born and Venezuelan naturalized) became the first Venezuelan and the oldest person at that time to reach the summit.
- (India) Ms. Santosh Yadav Became the first woman climb the Mount Everest twice.

=== 1995 ===
- (Brazil) May 14 – Waldemar Niclevicz and Mozart Catão are the first Brazilians to summit.
- (Latvia) May 14 – Teodors Ķirsis and Imants Zauls became the first Latvians to summit
- (Argentina) May 15 – Tommy Heinrich became the first Argentinian to summit.
- (Republic of Ireland) Pat Falvey became the first Irishman to reach the summit on the 27th of May 1995 at 09:10 am.
- (Turkey) May 17 – Nasuh Mahruki became the first Turk to summit.
- (Romania) May 17 – Constantin Lăcătuşu became the first Romanian to summit.
- (Wales) May 23 – Caradog Jones became the first Welshman to summit.
- (Denmark) Michael Knakkergaard Jørgensen becomes the first Dane to summit the tallest mountain in the world.

=== 1996 ===
- (Indonesia) Clara Sumarwati was the first Indonesian to reach the summit on September 26, 1996, according to the record of Everest Summiteers Association. ["List of all Indonesian Everest Summiteers". Everest Summiteers Association.]

=== 1997 ===
- (Finland) Veikka Gustafsson became the first Finn to reach the summit without the use of bottled oxygen.
- (Malaysia) M. Magendran, 23 May 1997 (11:55 am) and N. Mohandas, 23 May 1997 (12:10 pm) became the first Malaysians to reach the summit.
- (Iceland) On May 21, Hallgrimur Magnusson, Bjorn Olafsson, and Einar Kristjan Stefansson become the first Icelandics to reach the summit.

=== 1998 ===
- May 25 – Edwin and Khoo Swee Chiow became the first Singaporean to reach the summit on the first Singapore Mount Everest Expedition.
- (United Kingdom) May 26. 7:22 am. Bear Grylls reaches summit, becoming the youngest Briton of that time to summit Mount Everest.
- (Uzbekistan) Rustam Radjapov becomes the first Uzbek to reach the top of the world.

=== 1999 ===
- (Portugal) May 18 – João Garcia became the first Portuguese to reach the summit.
- (Ecuador) May 25 – Iván Vallejo became the first Ecuadorian to reach the top.
- (Belarus) Victor Koulabatchenko becomes the first Belarusian to summit Everest
- (Bolivia) Bernardo Guarachi becomes the first Bolivian to summit Everest.
- (Sweden) (Czech Republic) May 5 – Renata Chlumska became first Swedish and Czech woman to reach the summit.
- (Ukraine) May 8 – Vladislav Terzyul, Vasily Kopytko and Vladimir Gorbach became the first Ukrainians to reach the summit.

=== 2000 ===
- (Poland) May 22 – Anna Czerwińska, known for being the oldest woman to Summit Mount Everest (at the time) at the age of 50.

=== 2001 ===
- (Guatemala) May 23 – 32-year-old Guatemalan mountaineer Jaime Viñals became the first Central American to reach the summit.
- (Venezuela) May 23 – 36-year-old Venezuelans José Antonio Delgado and Marcus Tobía reached the summit with the first Venezuelan expedition to the mountain.
- (Nepal) May 23 – Temba Tsheri, age 16 years and 14 days, became the youngest person to reach the summit. He still holds the record title of 'youngest Everest Climber' according to the Guinness World Records.

=== 2002 ===
- (Armenia) May 16- Igor Khalatian becomes the first Armenian to reach the top of the world.
- (Hungary) May 25 – Zsolt Erőss became the first Hungarian to reach the summit.

=== 2003 ===
- (United States) May 21 – 21-year-old Jess Roskelley became the youngest American to reach the summit.
- (Estonia) May 22 – Alar Sikk became the first Estonian to reach the summit.
- (Kuwait) May 22 – Zed Al Refai became the first Arab and Kuwaiti man to reach the summit of Everest.

=== 2004 ===
- (Greece) 16-05-2004 In an expedition under Panayiotis Kotronaros and Paul Tsiantos leadership, George Voutyropoulos became the first Greek climber to the top, followed by Panayiotis Kotronaros, Paul Tsiantos, Michael Styllas, and Antonis Antonopoulos.

=== 2005 ===
- On May 29, a six-man Serbian expedition from the Vojvodina province reached the summit, the first expedition from Serbia to do so.
- (Mongolia) Gotovdorj Usukhbayar becomes the first Mongolian to summit Mount Everest on May 30, 2005.
- (Iran) On June 1, Farkhondeh Sadegh and Laleh Keshavarz become both the first Iranian women to reach the summit.
- On May 21, Karma Gyeltshen becomes the first person from Bhutan to summit Everest.

=== 2006 ===
- (Nepal) On May 6, Nepali woman Lhakpa Sherpa summits for the 6th time breaking her own record for most successful summits by any woman.
- (Lebanon) On May 15, Maxim Chaya, the first Lebanese on Everest, planted the Lebanese flag on the peak.
- On May 15, Eylem Elif Maviş became the first Turkish woman to summit Everest. She was part of the first team from Turkey, of which all ten members, among them four women, made the summit.
- (Philippines) On May 17, Leo Oracion became the first Filipino to reach the summit. He was followed by Erwin Emata on May 18 and Romi Garduce the following day. Another Filipino, Dale Abenojar claims to have reached the summit on May 15 although this is disputed.
- (United Kingdom) Rob Gauntlett, on May 17, successfully reached the summit alongside his friend James Hooper, becoming the youngest Briton to do so.
- (Brazil) On May 19, Brazilian Vitor Negrete reached the peak climbing through the north face without supplementary oxygen. During his descent he called Dawa Sherpa for help, who found and took Negrete down to camp 3, where he died.

=== 2007 ===
- (United States) May 16 – Samantha Larson became the youngest American (also rumored the youngest non-Nepalese) ever to summit Everest at age 18; simultaneously becoming the youngest person in the world to climb all of the Seven Summits.
- (Egypt) On May 17, Omar Samra became the first Egyptian and youngest Arab to reach the summit of Everest, at 7:19 EGP.
- (Philippines) On May 17, the first 3 Filipino women reached the summit of Mt Everest, coming from Tibet side and going down in Nepal side.
- (Azerbaijan) On May 19, Israfil Ashurly became the first Azerbaijani to summit.

=== 2008 ===
- (Thailand) May 22 – Vitidnan Rojanapanich became the first Thai on Everest, held Thai flag and His Majesty King Bhumibol Adulyadej image on top of the summit for his 60th coronation ceremony.
- (Australia) May 23 – Cheryl Bart and Nikki Bart became the first mother and daughter combination to summit. They became the first mother/daughter duo to complete the "Seven Summits" challenge, climbing the highest peak of every continent.
- (Jordan) May 25 – Mostafa Salameh became the first Jordanian to climb Everest, planting the Jordanian flag on the peak.
- (Nepal) May – Nimdoma Sherpa, 16 years old, becomes the youngest woman to reach the summit.
- (Algeria) Nadir Dendounne becomes the first Algerian to summit Everest.
- (Vietnam) Thanh Nhien Doan, Bui Van Ngoi, and MauLinh Nguyen became the first Vietnamese to summit Everest.
- (Canada) Laura Mallory Youngest Female Canadian to climb Mount Everest in May 2008 with her father and two brothers

=== 2009 ===
- (Nepal) On May 16, Apa Sherpa climbed Everest for the 19th time, once again breaking his own record.
- On May 19, Darija Boštjančić and Iris Boštjančić became the first women from Croatia to summit.
- (United States) May 20 – Scott Parazynski reached the summit, becoming the first astronaut to summit the world's tallest mountain.
- (United Kingdom) May 20 – Sir Ranulph Fiennes, 65, became the oldest Briton to climb Everest.
- (Singapore) May 20 – Li Hui, Esther Tan, and Jane Lee became the first Singaporean women to summit. They were part of the first Singaporean all-women team, of which five members out of six made the summit.
- (South Korea) On May 20, Korean climbers Park Young-seok, Jin Jae-chang, Kang Ki-seok, and Shin Dong-min reached the summit of Everest via a new route on the Southwest face (Park's Korean Route)
- (India) On May 21, Krushnaa Patil summited Everest via the South West Ridge, to become the youngest Indian person.
- (United States) May 23 – Lori Schneider, 52, became the first person in the world with MS to summit Mt Everest and complete the Seven Summits, as recognized by the World MS Federation

=== 2010 ===
- May 17 – Gregory Attard - a medical doctor working at Saint James Hospital, Malta, Marco Cremona, and Robert Gatt became the first persons from Malta to summit.
- May 20 – Đorđije Vujičić, Dragutin Vujović, and Marko Blečić became the first persons from Montenegro to summit Mt Everest. They are members of The Mountaineering-ski club "Javorak" from Nikšić.
- (India) May 22 – Arjun Vajpai became the youngest Indian to climb Mount Everest.
- (United States) May 22 – Jordan Romero, 13, became the youngest person ever to climb Everest.
- May 23 – Musa Ibrahim, 30, became the first person from Bangladesh to summit.
- May 23 – Andrea Cardona, 27, became the first woman from Central America and Guatemala to climb Everest.
- (United States) May 24 – John Dahlem, 66 years and 10 months, and son Ryan Dahlem, age 40 years, became the oldest father-son combination to stand on the summit of Mt Everest together.
- (Moldova) Andrei Carpenco became the first Moldovan to climb Everest.
- (Nepal) The first person to reach the summit fifteen times (31 May 2005) and the only one to reach it a twentieth time (22 May 2010) is Apa Sherpa, who first summited on 10 May 1990.

=== 2011 ===
- (Pakistan) May 12 – Hassan Sadpara, 47, became the first Pakistani man without oxygen supplement to scale Mount Everest.
- (Dominican Republic) May 21 – Karim Mella became the first Dominican to reach the summit.
- (Thailand) May 21 – Arkhom Kijwanichprasert, became the second Thai to reach the summit and the first Thai who got to the summit from North Ridge route on Tibetan side.
- (Palestine) May 21 – Suzanne Al Houby, became the first Palestinian and Arab woman to reach the summit.
- (Mauritius) May 26 – Jaysen Arumugum became the first Mauritian to reach the summit.

=== 2012 ===
- (Iran) May 18 – Parvaneh Kazemi, 42, is the first climber to reach the summit of Mount Everest in 2012. One week later on May 25, at 7 am, she climbed Lhotse, becoming the first woman to climb both Everest and Lhotse in the same season (28 men have accomplished this feat).
- (Bangladesh) May 19 – Nishat Majumder, 31, became the first Bangladeshi woman to climb Mount Everest.
- (Cyprus) May 19 – George Andreou, 39, became the first Cypriot to climb Mount Everest.
- May 24 – Warner Rojas became the first man from Costa Rica to climb Mount Everest.
- May 25 – Paul Keleher, 28, of the United Kingdom takes the London 2012 Olympic Flag to the top of Mount Everest, following the 2008 Summer Olympics summit of Mt. Everest when the Olympic flame was relayed over the summit.
- (Albania) May 26- Gjergj Bojaxhi, 38, became the first Albanian to climb Everest.
- (Japan) Tamae Watanabe breaks her own record as the oldest female summiteer, on 19 May at age 73 years and 180 days. She reached the summit from the north side.
- (Tanzania) Wilfred Moshi becomes the first Tanzanian to summit Everest on May 25, 2012.

=== 2013 ===
- May 17 – Ningthoujam Vidyapati Devi, 30, became the first woman from Manipur, India, to summit Mount Everest.
- May 18 – Wansuk Myrthong became the first woman from Meghalaya, India, to scale Mount Everest.
- May 18 – Raha Moharrak, 25, of Saudi Arabia, became the first Saudi woman and youngest Arab to summit Mount Everest.
- (Pakistan) May 19 – Samina Baig, 21, became the first Pakistani woman and the third Pakistani to scale Mount Everest.
- May 19 – Ravindra Kumar, became the first IAS from Begusarai, Bihar, India, to summit Mount Everest.
- (India) May 19 – 21-year-old Indian twin sisters Tashi Malik and Nungshi Malik became the first twins in the world to climb the Mount Everest.
- May 19 – United States Air Force, First US military climbing team to summit Mt Everest.
- (Morocco) May 20 – Nacer Ibn Abdeljalil, 33, became the first Moroccan man to summit Mount Everest.
- (India) May 21 – Raghav Joneja, 15, became the youngest Indian to climb Mount Everest.
- (India) May 21 – Arunima Sinha, 26, the first female amputee to reach the summit.
- (Andorra) May 22 – Domi Trastoy Diaz, 32, became the first Andorran man to summit Mount Everest.
- (Palestine) May 22 – Raed Zidan, 41, became the first Palestinian to reach the summit.
- (Qatar) May 22 – Sheikh Mohammed Al Thani becomes the first Qatari to summit Mount Everest
- (Lithuania) May 22 – Edita Nichols becomes the first Lithuanian woman to summit Everest.
- (Ecuador) May 22 – Paulina Aulestia Enriquez becomes the first Ecuadorian woman to summit the world's tallest mountain.

=== 2014 ===
- (India) May 25 – Malavath Purna became the youngest girl to summit Mount Everest, at 13 years and 11 months old.
- (Faroe Islands) May 25 – Arne Vatnhamar became the first Faroese to reach the summit.

=== 2016 ===
- (Tunisia) May – Tahar Manaï becomes the first Tunisian to summit Mount Everest
- (Sri Lanka) May – Weerahennedige Jayanthi Kuru Utumpala becomes the first Sri Lankan to summit Mount Everest.
- (Myanmar) May 19 – the first people from Burma reached the summit of Mount Everest.
- (Peru) May 19 – Silvia Vasquez-Lavado becomes the first Peruvian woman to reach the summit of Mount Everest.
- (Japan) May 21 – Satoshi Tamura becomes the first deaf person to summit Mount Everest.

=== 2017 ===
- (Mexico) May 16 – Viridiana Álvarez Chávez, seventh Mexican woman to reach the summit of Everest in 42 days as an expedition leader.
- May 21 – Ada Tsang becomes the first Hong Kong woman to reach the summit of Everest. She is a former secondary teacher in Hong Kong. She completed the climb in her third attempt, together with a physiotherapist and mountaineer, Elton Ng.
- (Iceland) May 21 – Vilborg Arna Gissurardóttir becomes the first Icelandic woman to summit Everest.
- (India) May 21 – Anshu Jamsenpa became the first woman to summit Everest twice within a week (she took five days to do so).
- (Singapore) May 22 – Yusrina Ya'akob became the first female Malay Singaporean to summit Everest.
- (Kosovo) May 22 – Uta Ibrahimi becomes the first Albanian woman to reach to summit Everest.

=== 2019 ===
- (South Africa) Saray Khumalo, a Zambia-born Johannesburg resident, became the first black African woman to summit Everest.
- (Lebanon) May 22 – Fatima Deryan, became the first Lebanese woman to summit Everest.

=== 2021 ===
- (Pakistan) Shehroze Kashif became youngest Pakistani to summit Everest.
- (Romania) Iulia and Delia became the youngest Romanian women to summit Everest.

== See also ==
- List of Mount Everest records
- List of 20th-century summiteers of Mount Everest
- List of Mount Everest summiteers by frequency
- List of first ascents of Mount Everest by nationality

== Bibliography ==
- Blacker, O.B.E., Lt. Col L.V.S. (August 1933). "The aerial conquest of Everest". National Geographic. Features full 36-page article on this historic 1933 over-flight. "A major scientific object of the Expedition was to photograph the conformation of inaccessible southern declivities of the massif out of reach of any climbing party." (p. 137)
- Gillman, Peter, ed. (1993). Everest – The Best Writing and Pictures from Seventy Years of Human Endeavour. Little, Brown and Company. ISBN 978-0-316-90489-6.
- Howard-Bury, Charles Kenneth; Leigh-Mallory, George H.; Wollaston, A. F. R. (1921). Mount Everest the Reconnaissance. New York: Longmans, Green, and Co.
- Hunt, John. The Ascent of Everest (Am. The Conquest of Everest). Hodder & Stoughton (Mountaineers' Books). 1953. ISBN 0-89886-361-9
- Unsworth, Walt (2000). Everest – The Mountaineering History (3rd ed.). Bâton Wicks. ISBN 978-1-898573-40-1.
