= Mohammed Al Thani =

Mohammed Al Thani may refer to any people in House of Thani, or people with Mohammed given name and Al Thani as clan name.

- Mohammed bin Hamad bin Khalifa Al Thani, brother of the current Emir (ruler) of Qatar.
- Mohammed bin Hamad bin Abdullah Al Thani, Qatari politician and ambassador.
- Muhammed bin Jassim Al Thani, ruler of Qatar 1913–1914.
- Mohammed bin Abdulla Al Thani, (born 1982), Qatari businessman and mountaineer.

bin Mohammed Al Thani also part of the surname, means son of Mohammed, descendant of Thani, may refer to:

- Jassim bin Mohammed Al Thani (1825–1913), the founder of the state of Qatar
- Saud bin Muhammed Al Thani (1966–2014), art collector, Qatari minister of Culture, Arts and Heritage

== See also ==
- Mohammed bin Thani
