= Al-Siyabi =

Al-Siyabi (Arabic: السيابي, romanized: as-Siyābī) is an Arabic surname. Notable people with the surname include:

- Ahmed Al-Siyabi (born 1993), Omani footballer
- Khalid Al-Siyabi (1972/73–2019), Omani civil servant and mountaineer
- Mohammed Al-Siyabi (born 1988), Omani footballer
- Taqi Mubarak Al-Siyabi (born 1978), Omani footballer
