= Musafir (company) =

Online travel agency

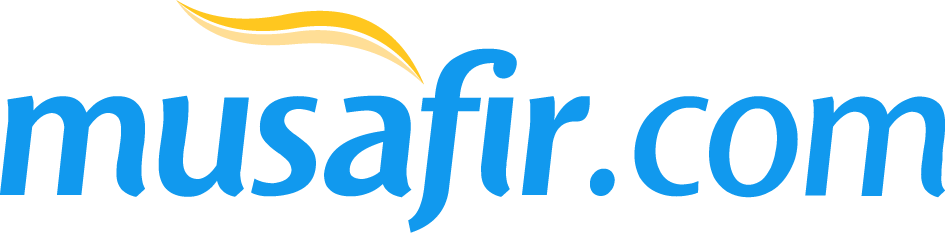
- Industry: Online Travel Agency
- Founded: 2007
- Headquarters: Dubai International Financial Centre, UAE
- Website: www.musafir.com

Musafir is an online travel agency founded in August 2007 by Sheikh Mohammed bin Abdulla Al Thani and Sachin Gadoya in Sharjah, UAE. It has 245 employees and 9 branches in the UAE, India and Qatar.

The company is headquartered in Dubai International Financial Centre (DIFC), UAE, and has offices in India, and Qatar.

== History ==
Musafir.com started as a retail travel agency, with its first retail branch opening in Sharjah in 2005. It was co-founded by Sheikh Mohammed bin Abdulla Al Thani and Sachin Gadoya. In 2005, the flagship branch was opened in Rolla (Al Soor), Sharjah. In 2008, the company launched a website, which was the first online travel portal in the UAE and Gulf Cooperation Council (GCC) under the name musafir.com. Musafir launched its first corporate branch in India in 2010.

In 2012, the company launched a brand campaign featuring Indian cricketer Sachin Tendulkar.

In 2018 it launched Musafir Business Platform, a travel management portal for corporate entities.

In 2022, the company moved to new corporate offices in Sharjah and Qatar, and the second Technology and Innovation Centre was opened in Pune, India.

== Founders ==
Musafir was co-founded by Sheikh Mohammed bin Abdulla Al Thani and by Sachin Gadoya. Sheikh Mohammed bin Abdulla Al Thani is the co-founder and Chairman of Musafir.com and also a member of the board of directors at Air Arabia. Sachin Gadoya is the CEO of Musafir.com and its co-founder. He graduated from the American University of Sharjah with a B.Sc. in Computer Engineering. Additionally, Sachin is the Managing Director of Gadoya Holdings, a conglomerate with 14 diverse companies.

Sheikh Mohammed bin Abdulla Al Thani and Sachin Gadoya together launched Musafir in 2008, as the U.A.E.'s first online travel agency.

== Operations ==
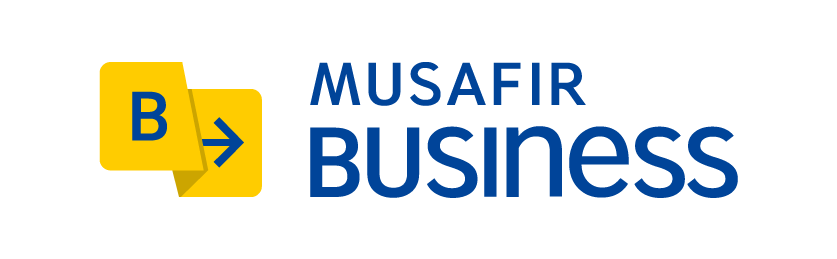
Musafir Business

Musafir.com is a travel company that provides all types of travel services, including flights, hotels, holiday packages, UAE Tourist visas and global visa assistance services to different types of travelers through its online platform, which operates as an OTA (online travel agency). In 2018, Musafir.com decided to expand from B2C to B2B business with the launch of its corporate travel platform Musafir Business. The platform is used by over 2,000 corporates and travel agents in UAE, Qatar and India that book their travel through Musafir Business. The all-in-one Business Travel Management platform developed by Musafir.com enables organizations to manage their business travel through automated approval workflows, travel policy compliance, visa assistance, preferential flight, and hotel rates.
