= Sikk =

Sikk is an Estonian surname. Notable people with the surname include:

- Alar Sikk (born 1966), Estonian alpinist
- Evald Sikk (1910–1945), Estonian wrestler
- Kuldar Sikk (born 1979), Estonian rally co-driver
