= Suzanne Al Houby =

Palestinian mountain climber

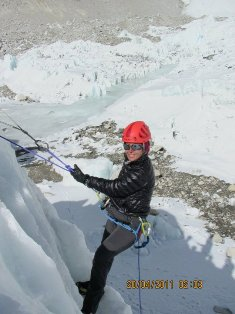
- Born: Jaffa
- Known for: Mountaineering, exploring, humanitarian
- Children: 2
- Website: www.rahhalah.com

Suzanne Al Houby is a Palestinian mountaineer. On May 21, 2011, she became the first Arab woman to climb Mount Everest and the seven Summits. She was also the first Arab woman to climb many other mountains, including Mont Blanc, Elbrus, Aconcagua, Vinson, Denali, and Carstensz Pyramid.

== Climbing ==
Al Hobby became climbing in the late 1990s. She became interested in climbing Everest after meeting Zed Al Refai, the first Arab man to climb the mountain, in 2002. In May 2003, she took her first expedition to Everest, becoming the first Arab woman to reach Everest Base Camp and Kala Pattar. She used the excursion to raise funds for a UAE healthcare initiative.

In 2006, she raised funds for Lebanese Palestinian refugee camps during an expedition to the Atlas Mountains in Morocco, where she reached the summit of Toubkal, the highest peak in the region.

== Personal life ==
Al Houby and her family are from Jaffa, a port city currently a part of Tel Aviv, Israel. She got her higher education in the United States, and has lived most of her life in the United Arab Emirates. She is the founder and CEO of the adventure travel company Rahhalah.

She has two children. As of 2010, she and her children lived in Dubai, and she worked as vice-president of the Dubai Bone and Joint Centre.
