= Ernst Schmied =

Swiss mountaineer (1924–2002)

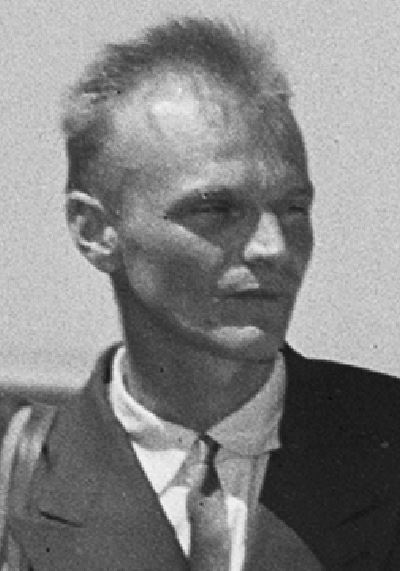
Ernst Schmied in 1956

Ernst Schmied (1924 in Bern, Switzerland - 22 March 2002) was a Swiss Mountaineer. He is best known for achieving the second successful summit of Mount Everest, on 23 May 1956, as part of the 1956 Swiss Expedition to Everest and Lhotse.

Prior to the 1956 expedition, Schmied had built a reputation for being capable on both "stiff rock climbs" and "great ice ascents".
