= Evelyne Binsack =

Swiss mountaineer and helicopter pilot

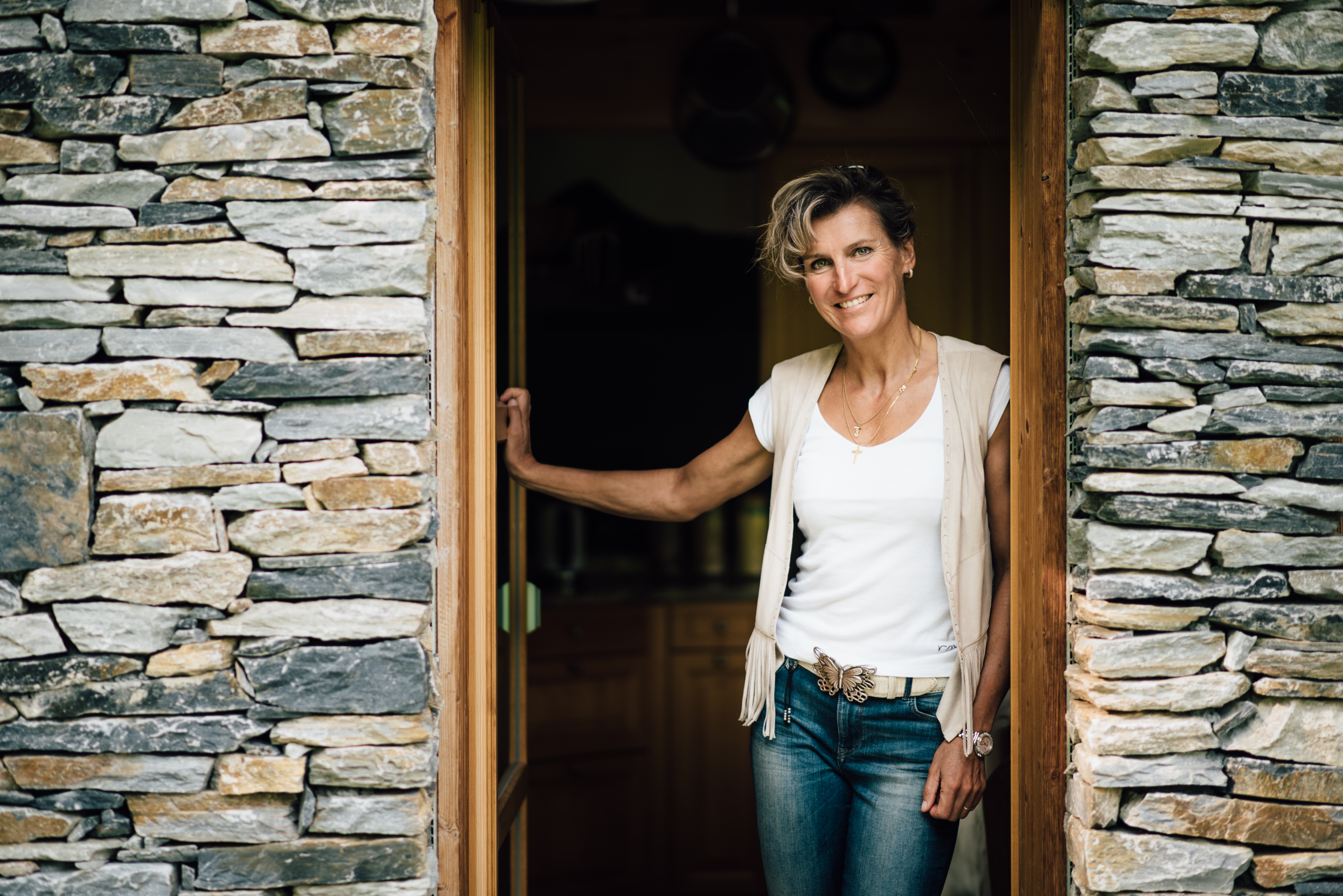
- Evelyne Binsack, 2018

Personal information
- Nationality: Swiss
- Born: 17 May 1967 (age 59) Hergiswil, Canton of Nidwalden
- Occupations: mountaineer, mountain guide, helicopter pilot, adventurer, author

Climbing career
- Type of climber: Mountaineering
- Known for: The first Swiss woman to have reached the summit of Everest. The first person to reach the North and South Poles from Switzerland by bicycle and on foot, thus crossing the entire hemisphere using only muscle power.

Evelyne Binsack (born 17 May 1967) is a Swiss mountaineer, international mountain guide UIAGM, adventurer, helicopter pilot and book author.

== Career ==
Binsack grew up in Hergiswil, Switzerland and now lives in the Bernese Oberland in Switzerland.

In 1991, at the age of 24, Evelyne Binsack was one of the first women in the world, and the youngest alpinist, to receive a Swiss federal diploma as a mountain guide.

In 1999, she obtained her professional pilot's license as a helicopter pilot and worked for six years as a professional helicopter pilot for power line maintenance as well as passenger flights in Switzerland and Spain.

2012 she studied to become documentary filmmaker on NYFA (New York Film Academy) in Los Angeles / California. In 2013, she shot the documentary feature ÜberLebensWille ("Willpower to Survive") on Mount Everest.

Since 2019, Evelyne Binsack lectures coaching sessions for executives in addition to her lectures.

== Expeditions ==
In 1990, she climbed the north face of the Eiger in the icy winter, followed by a solo ascent of the northeast face in 1994. As part of a live broadcast by Swiss and German television, she climbed the Heckmair route of the Eiger north face in a four-man team. The live broadcast was awarded "The Film of the Year" in 1999.

In 1993 followed an expedition in the Karakorum (Himalayas) with 11 first ascents of 5000 – 6000 meter high mountains in Pakistan.

During two expeditions to Patagonia, she climbed Fitz Roy in 1995 and Guillomet and Poincenot in 1996.

In 1996, she climbed what was then Europe's tallest office building, the 257-meter-high Frankfurt Messeturm.

On 23 May 2001, she became the first Swiss woman to reach the highest mountain in the world, the 8,848-meter Mount Everest, in a solo summit attempt. A documentary was created about Binsack called Evelyne Binsack: Defeating Mt. Everest and reaching New Heights.

As a mountain guide, she led rope teams through the most difficult Alpine walls, such as the Frêney Pillar on Mont Blanc, the Walker Pillar on the Grandes Jorasses and the Bonatti Pillar on the Aiguille du Dru.

From September 2006 to December 2007, Binsack carried out the "Expedition Antarctica". She reached the South Pole from her home in Switzerland using only muscle power. During the 484-day journey she covered over 25,000 kilometers riding solo on her touring bicycle through 16 countries to reach southern Chile. For the subsequent expedition from the Antarctic coast to the South Pole, she joined forces with four international team members and completed the 1,600-kilometer walk at temperatures as low as minus 40 °C with skis and sleds. The expedition was unsupported and unresupplied. For this achievement, she was nominated "Swiss Woman of the Year" in 2008.

In 2016 – 2017 after a total of 105 expedition days, Evelyne Binsack reached the geographic North Pole in four stages, partly on her own and partly with a team. She thus completed the planned trilogy of the "Three Poles" and was the first person to reach the highest, (Mount Everest) the southernmost, (South Pole) and the northernmost (North Pole), point on Earth under her own muscle power. She is the only person to have crossed the entire hemisphere by muscle power.

== Trivia ==
In the course of the 60th anniversary of the "Barbie™" doll in 2019, the brand honors a long line of female role models. Binsack was honored as a female role model as the first Swiss woman with her own Barbie doll.

== Bibliography ==
- (in German) Evelyne Binsack, Gabriella Baumann von Arx: Schritte an der Grenze. Die erste Schweizerin auf dem Mount Everest. Frederking & Thaler, München 2004, ISBN 3-89405-221-X (National geographic adventure press 221). ePub ISBN 9783037637418
- (in German) Evelyne Binsack, Markus Maeder: Expedition Antarctica. 484 Tage bis ans Ende der Welt. Wörterseh Verlag, Gockhausen 2008, ISBN 978-3-03763-004-4.
- (in German) Evelyne Binsack, Doris Büchel: Grenzgängerin, Ein Leben für drei Pole. Wörterseh Verlag, Gockhausen 2017, ISBN 978-3-03763-093-8
