= Raha Moharrak =

First Saudi woman to climb Mt Everest

- رها محرق
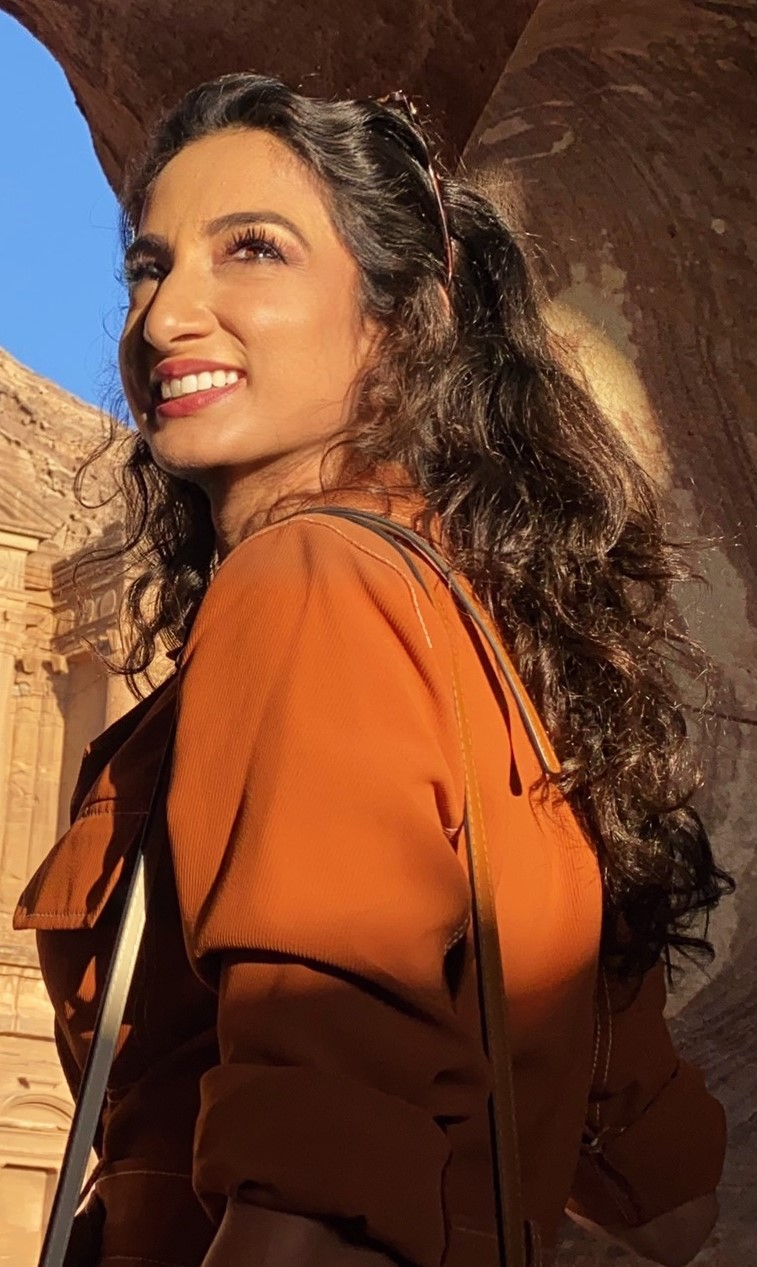
- Raha Moharrak in 2019.
- Born: January 25, 1986 (age 40); Jeddah, Saudi Arabia
- Occupation: Art Director
- Known for: First Saudi woman to climb Mount Everest
- Website: rahamoharrak.com

Raha Moharrak (Arabic: رها محرق) (born c. 1986) is the youngest Arab and the first Saudi woman to climb Mount Everest. Previously she climbed Kilimanjaro, Mount Vinson, Mount Elbrus, Aconcagua, Kala Pattar, Pico de Orizaba and Tajamulco.

== Early life ==
Moharrak the youngest of three was born in Jeddah, Saudi Arabia to Hassan Moharrak and graduated from the American University, Sharjah in visual communication. She is currently pursuing her MBA at Synergy University Dubai Campus with a specialization in Women's Leadership. She lives in Dubai now where she is a graphic designer. According to the CNN, she said that "convincing them [her family] to let her climb was as great a challenge as the mountain itself!"

== Climbing Mount Everest ==
In February 2013, Moharrak reached the summit of Aconcagua in Argentina, the highest summit outside Asia.

She was in a team of 34 other mountaineers and 29 guides in reaching the summit on May 18, 2013 from the Nepalese side of the mountain. Her four-member expedition team Arabs with Altitude included the first Qatari man, Mohammed Al Thani from Qatar's royal family and the first Palestinian man, Raed Zidan

Speaking about her achievement, she said: "I really don't care about being the first, so long as it inspires someone else to be second."

In 2017, Moharrak scaled all the Seven Summits and became the first Saudi woman to climb the Seven Summits.

== See also ==
- Muslim women in sport
