= Khalid Al-Siyabi =

Omani mountaineer (1972/73–2019)

Undated portrait photograph

Khalid Al-Siyabi (Arabic: خالد السيابي; 1972 or 1973 – 28 April 2019) was an Omani civil servant and mountaineer. In May 2010 he became the first Omani climber to reach the summit of Mount Everest, the world's highest mountain, and he previously became the first Arab to climb Mount Pumori in 2009.

== Career in government ==
Before gaining wider attention as a climber, Al-Siyabi worked in Oman's education and government sectors. He was a senior official in the Ministry of Education of Oman prior his attempt to summit Mount Everest. After returning from the Himalayas he became General Manager of Information Technology at the Ministry of Education and later served as General Manager of e-Government Services at the Information Technology Authority (ITA). He sat on Oman Vision 2040's Corporate Governance Committee and the Scientific Team for Future Prospecting.

== Mountaineering career ==
=== Pumori ===
Prior to climbing Mount Everest, Al-Siyabi joined the 2009 expedition to Mount Pumori in the Himalayas. He became the first Arab to reach the 7,145-metre Pumori in 2009 according to the Deutsch Omanisch Gesellschaft.

=== Everest expedition ===
Al-Siyabi's Everest attempt began in early April 2010. He left Muscat on 1 April 2010 and summited on 23 May 2010 after a climb lasting about two months; he received his summit certificate from Nepal's Ministry of Tourism on 1 June 2010. He was 37 years old at the time and said that the climb commemorated the 40th National Day of Oman. He credited Sherpa guides as the "real heroes" of the expedition and recounted seeing bodies of climbers along the route.

=== Influence and mentoring ===
After returning from Everest, Al-Siyabi spoke publicly about environmental issues such as glacial melting and global warming, saying that carbon dioxide emissions were damaging the Himalayas. He later mentored Nadhira Al-Harthy, a civil servant who became the first Omani woman to summit Everest on 23 May 2019. Al-Harthy also said she trained under him for two years and that his death came only weeks before her climb, while she was at Everest base camp.

== Death and legacy ==
Al-Siyabi died on 28 April 2019 at the age of 46; the cause of death was not disclosed. Obituaries acknowledged his public-service and mountaineering contributions and noted his roles within Oman's Vision 2040 initiatives. When Nadhira Al-Harthy reached the summit of Everest in May 2019 she held a sign reading "In memory of Khalid Al Siyabi", and she later credited his coaching and encouragement with enabling her success.

== See also ==
- Nadhira Al Harthy – first Omani woman to climb Mount Everest
- List of first ascents of Mount Everest by nationality
