= Andrea Cardona =

Guatemalan mountaineer

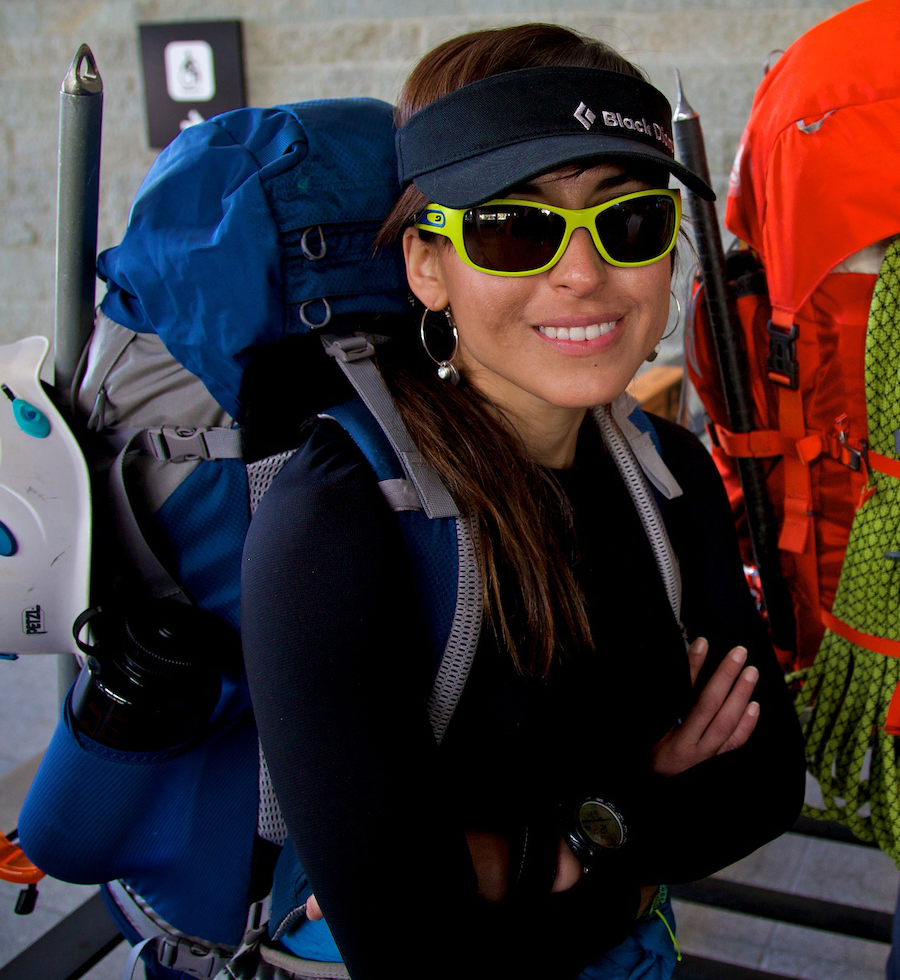
- Cardona in 2014

Personal information
- Born: 19 June 1982 (age 44) Guatemala City
- Website: AndreaCardona.com

Climbing career
- Type of climber: Trekking, Hiking, Mountaineer, Motivational Speaker

Andrea Cardona (born 19 June 1982) is a Guatemalan mountaineer, the first Central American woman to reach the summit of Mount Everest and the first Latin American to complete the Adventurers Grand Slam.

== Early life ==
Andrea Melissa Cardona Morfín was born in Guatemala City.

At age 18, inclined to engage in the Tourism Industry, she applied for a scholarship at the University of Genoa in Italy and four years later graduated from Tourism Economics. She later worked for a hotel chain in Sardinia and then in New York City, performing desk job in the marketing area.

Andrea applied for a job as a guide, which she found with a Brazilian tour operator based in Asia. After making seven treks to the base camp of Mount Everest and discovering an innate passion for mountaineering, she proposed to challenge herself as being "the first Central American woman to climb the highest peaks on earth"

Among her main achievements and challenges are "The Seven Summits", "The Three Poles Challenge Planet" and "Explorers Grand Slam".

== Three Poles Challenge ==
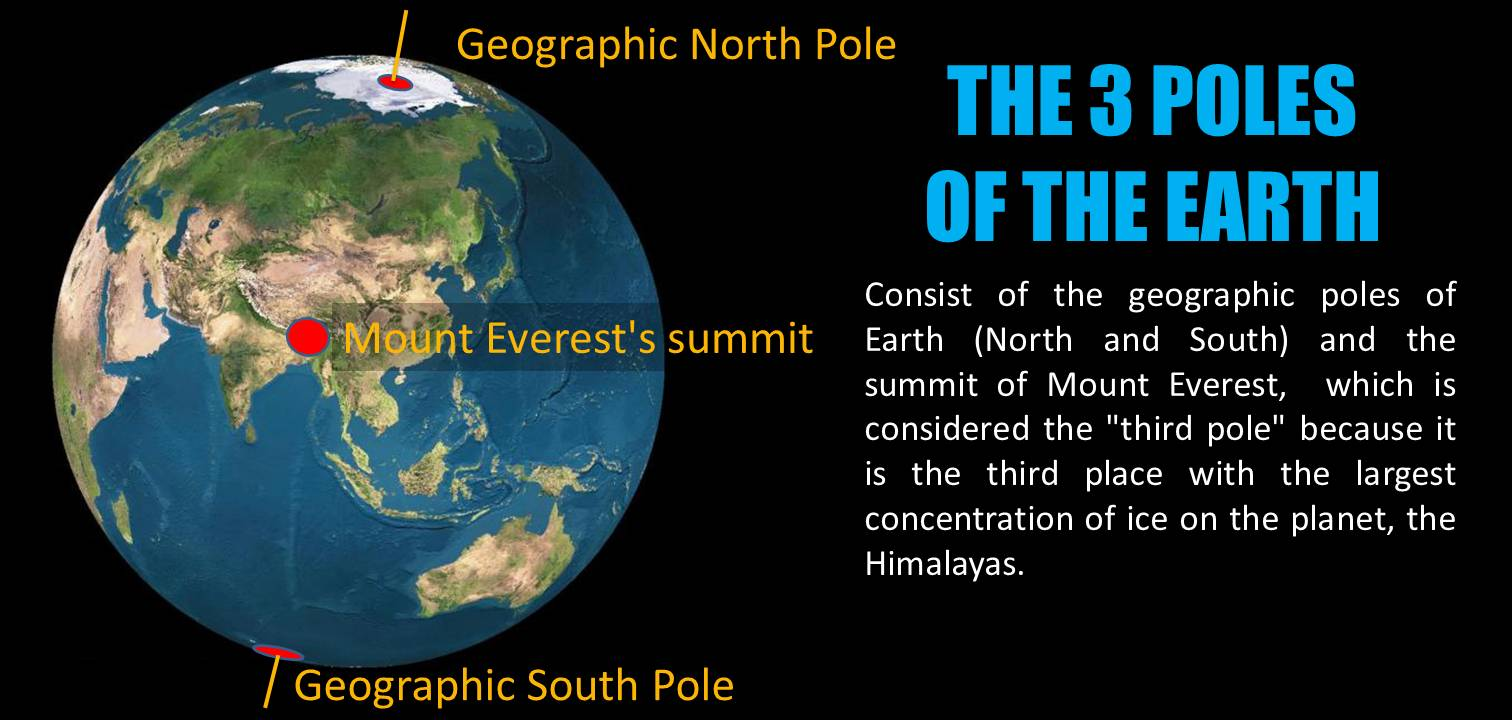
The Earth 3 Poles

On 23 May 2010 Andrea Cardona became the first Central American woman to climb Mount Everest, the highest peak in the world and the so-called Third Pole of the Planet, being the third largest ice storage of the globe.

Subsequently, on 28 December 2011, began a new challenge in Antarctica after having skied 111.11 kilometers (equivalent to a terrestrial latitude) in a week, a woman got placed for the first time in history, the flag of Guatemala at the geographic South Pole.

On Tuesday, 17 April 2012, ended the challenge of the three poles of the planet, skiing 111.11 kilometers again, this time to the geographic north pole, which is located in the Arctic Ocean.

Thus Andrea Cardona carried the flag of Guatemala to a new record by becoming the first Latin American woman to accomplish this feat.

== Adventurers Grand Slam ==
The Explorers Grand Slam or Adventurers Grand Slam is an adventurer's challenge to reach the North Pole, the South Pole, and all of the Seven Summits.

Some 28 people have completed the Explorers Grand Slam.
