= Uta Ibrahimi =

Albanian alpinist from Kosovo (born 1983)

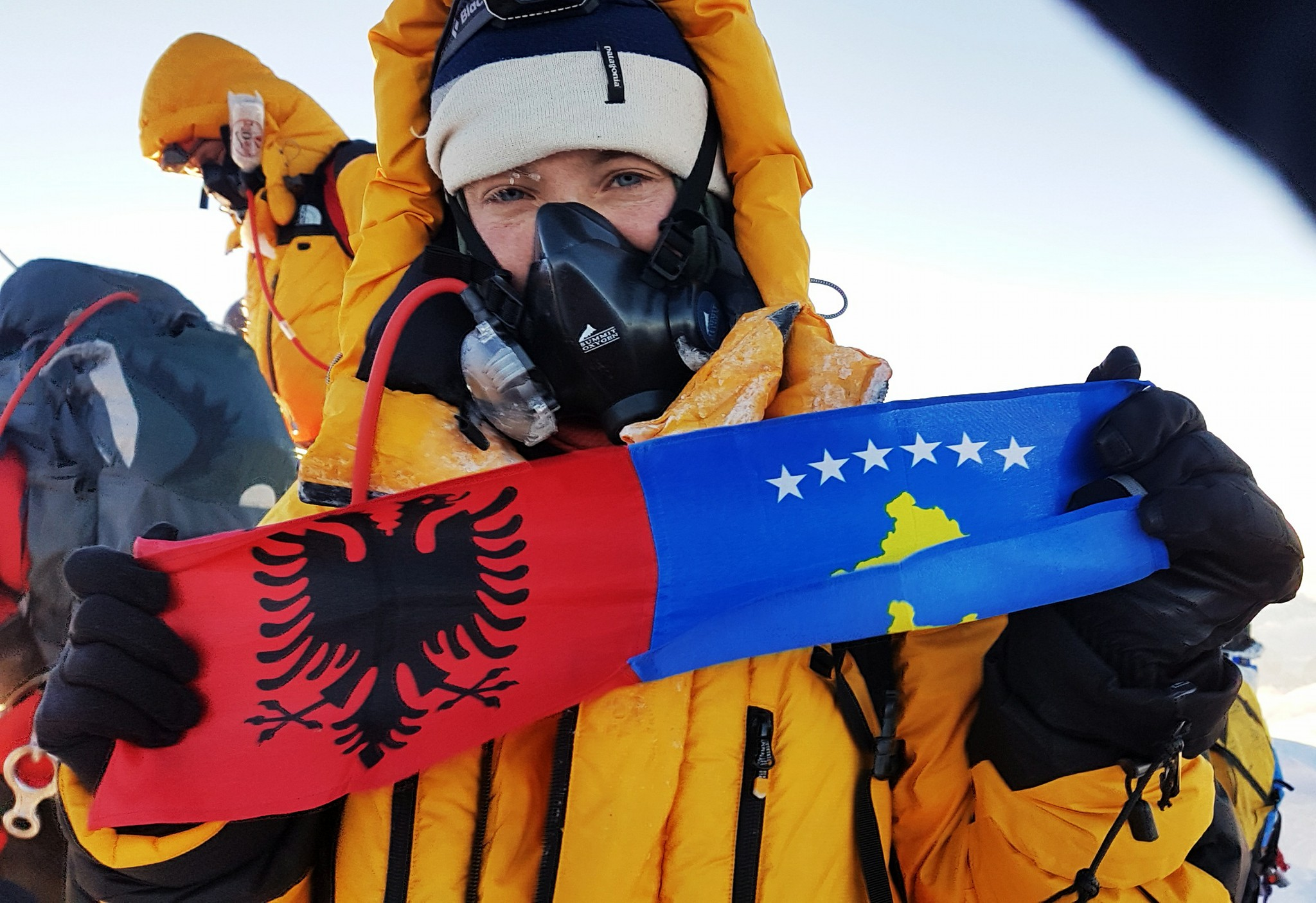
- Ibrahimi in 2017, in Mount Everest

Personal information
- Full name: Flutura Ibrahimi
- Nationality: Kosovar, Albanian
- Born: 27 November 1983 (age 42) Gjilan, Yugoslavia

Uta Ibrahimi (born 27 November 1983, Gjilan) is an Albanian alpinist from Kosovo.

She is the first Albanian woman to climb Mount Everest, the highest peak in the world and first woman from the Balkans to climb all 14 of the eight-thousanders.

Through her alpinism activities, and media appearances, Uta seeks to raise awareness about the environment and human rights, particularly in Kosovo and Albania.

== Biography ==
Uta Ibrahimi was born in the city of Gjilan, at the time part of Yugoslavia. She graduated from the Faculty of Economics, at the University of Prishtina, where she studied Marketing.

She began her career as a marketing assistant at Iliria University, to continue her work in various private companies. Uta has worked as the Director of Ogilvy Karrota marketing agency. Uta has also worked a marketing manager, jury member, and event organizer for DokuFest, a documentary film festival. In 2015 she left her career in marketing to focus on climbing.

In 2016, she founded Butterfly Outdoor Adventures Company, with the aim to promote culture and tourism in Kosovo.

In 2019, Uta established the Utalaya Foundation to promote environmentalism and feminism through mountain climbing.

== Climbing career ==
Summits Uta has climbed
Year	Summits	Country	Continent	Elevation m
2014	Musala	Bulgaria	Europe	2,925
2014	Mount Olympus	Greece	Europe	2,918
2016	Erciyes	Turkey	Europe	3,916
2016	Mount Hasan	Turkey	Europe	3,200
2016	Aladaglar	Turkey	Europe	3,599
2016	Emler	Turkey	Europe	3,500
2015	Mont Blanc	France	Europe	4,880
2018	Mount Rainier	Seattle	USA	4392
2016	Yalung Peak	Nepal	Asia	5,700
2016	Nurbu Peak	Nepal	Asia	5,800
2016	Ramdung Peak	Nepal	Asia	5,925
2017	Labuche East	Nepal	Asia	6,119
2018	Island	Nepal	Asia	6,189
2018	Ama Dablam	Nepal	Asia	6812
March 2016	Triglav	Slovenia	Europe	2,864
2017	Mönch Peak	Switzerland	Europe	4,107
22 May 2017	Mount Everest	Nepal	Asia	8,848
26 September 2017	Manaslu	Nepal	Asia	8,163
28 September 2018	Cho-Oyu	Nepal	Asia	8,201
25 May 2018	Lhotse	Nepal	Asia	8,516
14 July 2019	Gasherbrum I	Nepal	Asia	8,080
17 April 2021	Annapurna 1	Nepal	Asia	8,091
14 May 2022	Makalu	Nepal	Asia	8,485
18 May 2023	Dhaulagiri	Nepal	Asia	8,167
2 July 2023	Nanga Parbat	Pakistan	Asia	8,125
23 July 2023	Broad Peak	Pakistan	Asia	8,047
27 July 2023	K2	Pakistan	Asia	8,611
21 July 2024	Gasherbrum II	Pakistan	Asia	8,035
9 October 2024	Shishapangma	China	Asia	8,027
10 May 2025	Kangchenjunga	Nepal	Asia	8,586
18 May 2026	Mount Everest	Nepal	Asia	8,848
