= Lev Sarkisov =

Armenian mountaineer (1938–2024)

- Born: Lev Sarkisov; 2 October 1938; Voronezh
- Died: 2 February 2024 (aged 85)
- Occupation: Mountaineer

Lev Sarkisov (2 December 1938 – 2 February 2024) was a Georgian-Armenian mountaineer known for being the oldest man to have climbed Mount Everest.

== Career ==
Sarkisov worked as a mentor for mountaineers in the Georgian Armed Forces before moving onto recreational climbing. He climbed Mount Ararat four times and took the Armenian flag to the peak despite the risk of arrest.

On 12 May 1999, Sarkisov became the oldest man to have reached the summit of Mount Everest at the age of 60 years and 161 days, breaking the previous record held by Venezuelan climber Ramón Balanca Suárez. He was officially recognized by the Guinness World Records as the oldest mountaineer to have ever scaled the mountain. His record was surpassed in 2001 by American mountaineer Sherman Bull.

Sarkisov was awarded the Order of Honor by President Eduard Shevardnadze in 1999 and was also a recipient of the Snow Leopard award.

Sarkisov died on 2 February 2024, at the age of 85.

== See also ==
- List of Mount Everest records
