= Sharon Wood =

Canadian mountaineer

Sharon Adele Wood (born May 18, 1957), a Canadian mountaineer and guide, was the first North American woman to reach the summit of Mount Everest on May 20, 1986. She climbed via the new route of the west shoulder from the Rongbuk Glacier; with Dwayne Congdon and without Sherpa assistance. She is considered an important female mountaineer in climbing history.

== See also ==
- List of 20th-century summiters of Mount Everest
- List of Mount Everest records
