= Saray Khumalo =

Female South African mountaineer

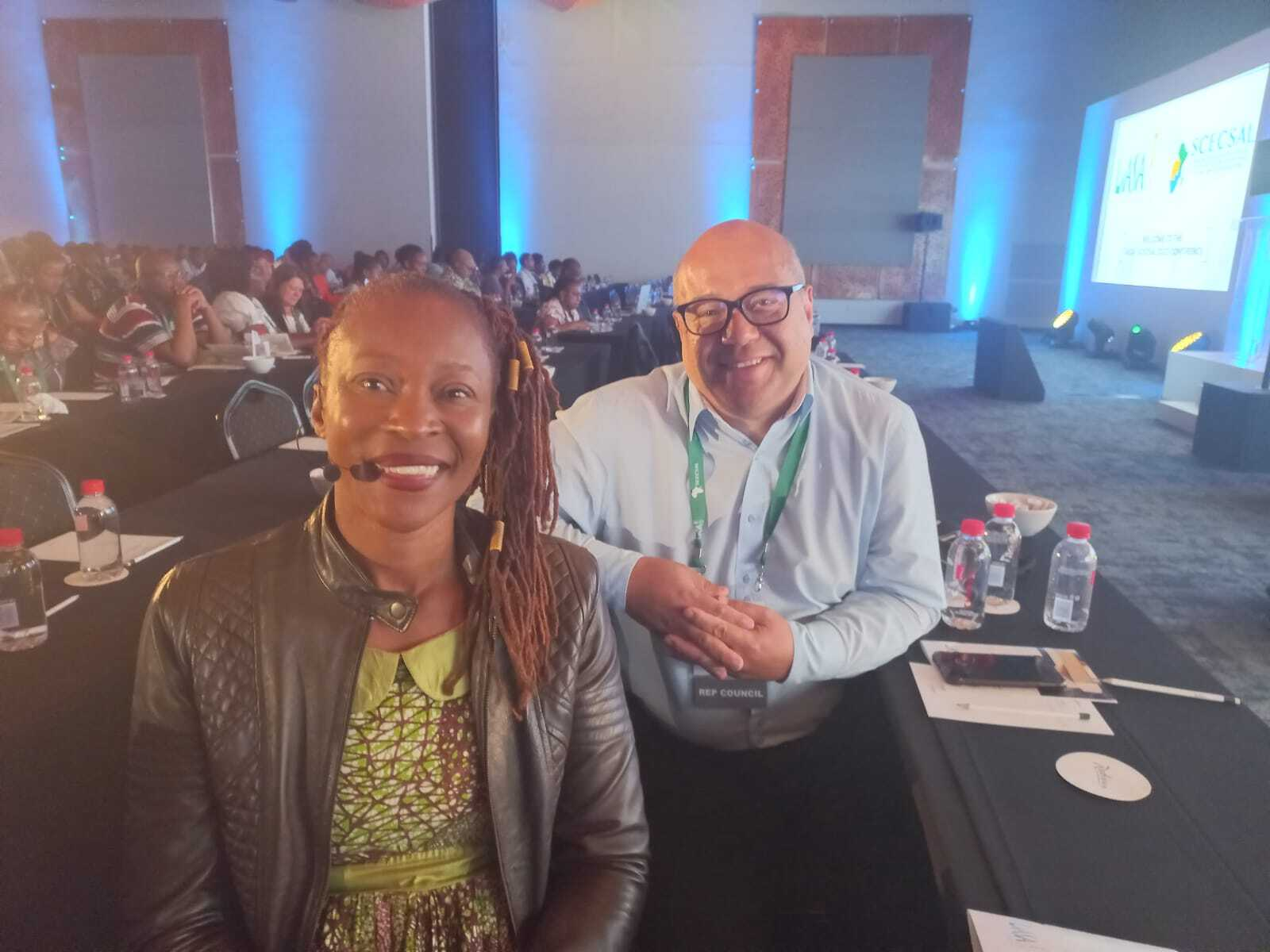
- Saray Khumalo (left) at LIASA conference 2022.

Personal information
- Born: 1972 (age 53–54) Zambia
- Occupation: Mountaineer
- Children: 2

Saray Khumalo (born 1972) is a Zambian-born, South African explorer and mountaineer. In May 2019, she became the first black African woman to reach the summit of Mount Everest.

== Personal life ==
With a Rwandan bloodline but now resident in South Africa, Khumalo was born in Zambia. She works as an e-commerce business executive. She is a mother of two children.

== Climbing career ==
Prior to her 2019 success, she had attempted several times to climb Mount Everest. Her first attempt was in 2014, when she was halted after an avalanche that killed 16 guides on the slope. She tried again in 2015, but was halted by an earthquake in Nepal. Her final try, before her success, was in 2017, where she was forced to turn back because of the terrible weather.

Saray has also completed the Seven Summits challenge, which involves climbing the highest peaks on each of the seven continents. It includes Mount Everest (Asia), Mount Kilimanjaro (Africa), Denali (North America), Aconcagua (South America), Vinson Massif (Antartica), Mount Elbrus (Europe), and Mount Kosciuszko (Australia) or Carstensz Pyramid (Australasia).

== Asia: Mount Ever ==
=== Mountaineering summit ===
- Aconcagua (Argentina) in 2015
- Kilimanjaro (Tanzania) in 2012
- Mount Elbrus (Russia) in 2014
- Mount Everest (Nepal) in 2019
- Denali (United States) in 2022
- Vinson Massif (Antarctica) in 2022
- Mount Kosciuszko (Australia) in 2023

=== Polar Expeditions ===
- South Pole - last degree (Antarctica) in 2019

== Philanthropy ==
Khumalo is a Nelson Mandela Libraries ambassador who raises funds through her mountain climbing to support several projects including iSchoolAfrica, the Lunch Box Fund and the Mandela Library project in Thembisa, Johannesburg.

In 2020, she set a Guinness World Record for the most money raised during an eight-hour stationary cycling fundraiser to build digital libraries for children whose education had been impacted by the COVID-19 pandemic.
