= Mikael Reuterswärd =

Personal information
- Nationality: Swedish
- Born: 26 December 1964
- Died: January 2010 (aged 45)

Climbing career
- Type of climber: mountaineering
- Major ascents: Mount Everest; Lhotse; Mount McKinley

Måns Mikael Reuterswärd (26 December 1964 – c. 25 January 2010) was a Swedish adventurer and mountain climber.

On 11 May 1990, Reuterswärd and fellow climber Oskar Kihlborg became the first Swedes to reach the summit of the Mount Everest - Reuterswärd was the first individual by three hours - and in 1994 he and Kihlborg became the first Scandinavians to climb the world's fourth-highest mountain Lhotse in the Himalayas. In 1989, Reuterswärd climbed the Pioneer Ridge on the northern peak of North America's highest mountain Mount McKinley.

On 29 January 2010, Reuterswärd was found dead in his cabin outside Stockholm.
