= Renata Chlumska =

Swedish mountain climber (born 1973)

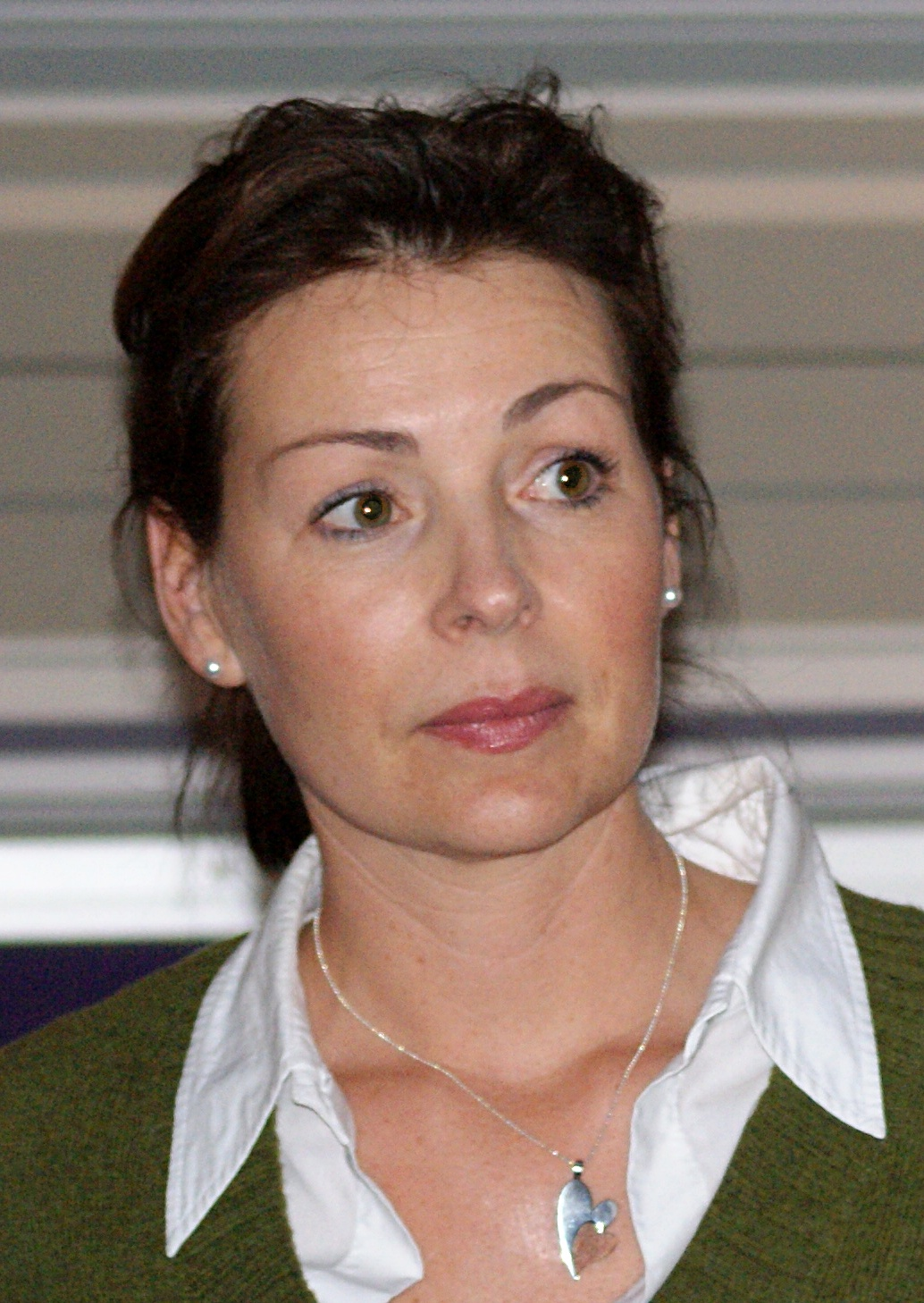
- Chlumska at the Swedish release of Saving Mount Everest

Personal information
- Nationality: Swedish and Czech
- Born: 9 December 1973 (age 52) Malmö, Sweden
- Occupations: Adventurer and Mountain Climber
- Website: renata.nu

Climbing career
- Known for: First Swedish and Czech woman to climb Mount Everest.
- Updated on 13 January 2015

Renata Chlumska (born 9 December 1973 in Malmö, Sweden) is an adventurer and mountain climber. Born to Czech parents, she has both Swedish and Czech citizenship.

On 5 May 1999, she became the first Swedish and Czech woman to climb Mount Everest.

During 2005 and 2006 she performed a challenge called "Around America Adventure" in the lower 48 states of the United States. She paddled a kayak from Seattle to San Diego, bicycled with the kayak on a carriage from San Diego to Brownsville, Texas, continued kayaking around Florida to Eastport, Maine, and then bicycled back to Seattle. She became the first person to circumnavigate 32 states by bicycle and kayak.

She was engaged to Göran Kropp when he died in a climbing accident.

== See also ==
- List of female adventurers
- List of 20th-century summiters of Mount Everest
