= Raed Zidan =

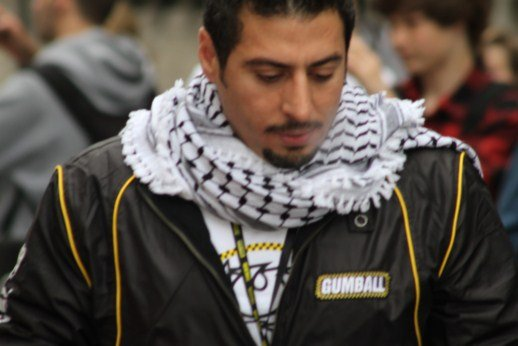
- Born: Kuwait
- Occupations: CEO, Zidan Management Group
- Known for: First Palestinian man to summit Mount Everest and the first Palestinian man to reach all Seven Summits.

Raed Zidan is the first Palestinian man to summit Mount Everest and the first Palestinian man to reach all Seven Summits

== Early life ==
Raed Zidan was born in Kuwait to Palestinian emigrants. His parents emigrated from Kufr Lakef, Palestine, near Qalqilya to Kuwait. Zidan, who resides in both the United States and Dubai, UAE is the owner and CEO of Zidan Management Group, and Shock Middle East.

== Climbing Mount Everest ==
Raed Zidan is an accomplished mountaineer and the first Palestinian man to reach all seven of the Seven Summits including Vinson Massif in Antarctica, Mount Kilimanjaro and Aconcagua in Argentina.

On June 1, 2016, Zidan summited Denali in Alaska along with Sheikh Mohammed Al Thani, Masoud Mohammed, and Suzanne Al Houby. The team was known by the name "Arabs with Altitude".
