= Alar Sikk =

Estonian alpinist

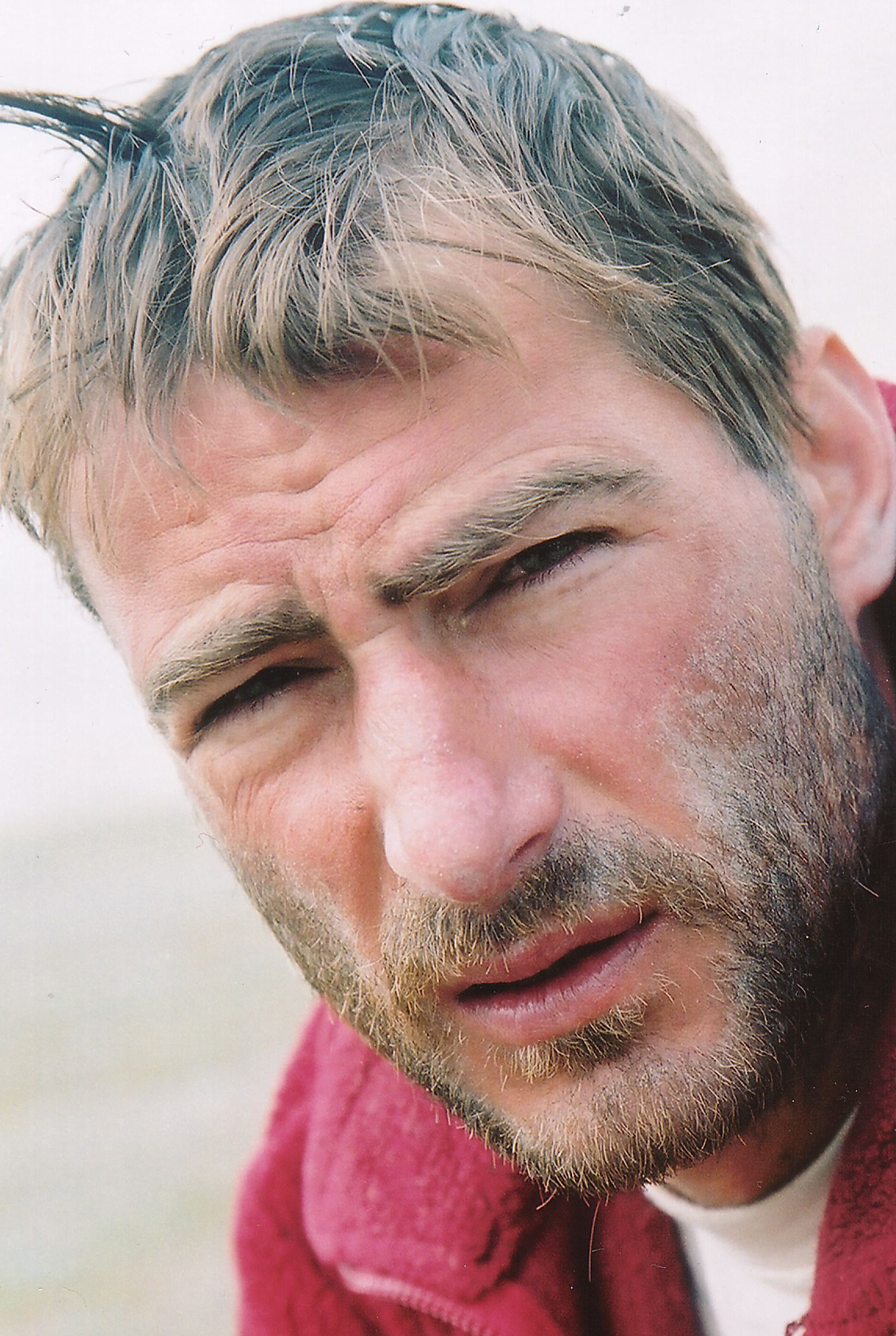
- Sikk in 2002
- Born: January 4, 1966 (age 60); Võru, then part of Estonian SSR, Soviet Union
- Occupations: mounteer, alpinist
- Known for: first Estonian to reach the summit of Mount Everest

Alar Sikk (born 4 January 1966 in Võru) is an Estonian alpinist.

Since 1998 he has practiced alpinism under the guidance of Jaan Künnap. On May 22, 2003, he reached the summit of Mount Everest, becoming the first Estonian to reach the highest summit in the world.

== Awards ==
- 2003 and 2007: Hiker of the Year (Estonian: aasta matkaja).
- 2004 he was awarded with Order of the Estonian Red Cross, III class.
