= Mohammed bin Abdullah Al Thani =

Muhammad ibn Abdullah al Thani
- Sheikh
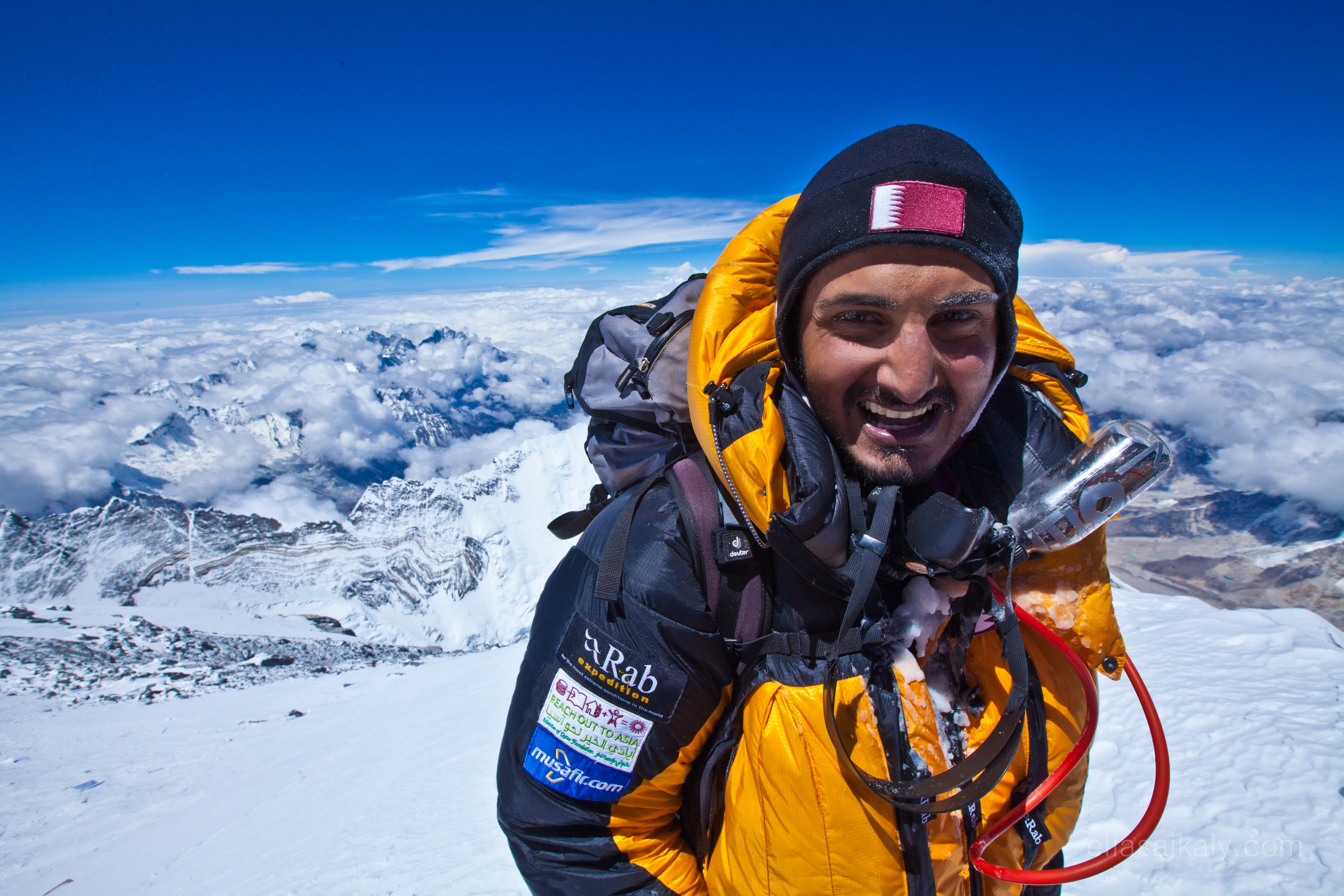
- Born: 16 June 1982 (age 44); Sharjah, United Arab Emirates
- Issue: Sheikh Abdullah ibn Muhammad al Thani
- House: Al-Thani
- Father: Abdullah ibn Muhammad ibn Ali Al Thani
- Religion: Sunni Islam
- Occupation: Manager, Statesman and Sportsman

Sheikh Mohammed bin Abdullah Al Thani (Arabic: الشيخ محمد بن عبدالله آل ثاني; born 16 June 1982), known as Moe Al Thani, is a Qatari and Emirati sheikh, philanthropist and sportsman. He is the first Qatari to have climbed Mount Everest and the Seven Summits. He has been member and chairman of the boards of various companies, and as of 2026 he is also the president of the 3-2-1 Qatar Olympic and Sports Museum.

== Early life and education ==
As son of Sheikh Abdullah bin Muhammad bin Ali al Thani, Sheikh Mohammed is a member of the Qatari House of Al Thani as well as the Emirati Al-Qasimi royal family though his paternal grandmother, who is the sister of the current Emir of Sharjah.

Sheikh Mohammed graduated from the American University of Sharjah with a Bachelors of Science in Marketing and Accounting and a Master of Business Administration (MBA). He studied Business Administration at Harvard Business School, receiving Alumni Status.

== Mountaineering ==
Sheikh Mohammed became the first Qatari to reach the summit of Mount Everest on 22 May 2013. He is the first Qatari man to reach the Seven Summits; reach "the bottom of the world" and "ski the last degree" to the South Pole in commemoration of Qatar’s National Day on 18 December 2012; and summit Ama Dablam, at an altitude of 6812 meters, on 11 November 2020.

During the Everest climb, he was part of a four-member group called Arabs with Altitude, which included the first Palestinian man, Raed Zidan, the first Saudi woman Raha Moharrak and Iranian, Masoud Mohammed, to reach the summit of Mount Everest. Arabs with Altitude received global media coverage upon their return from Mount Everest.

== Record of mountaineering ==
Sheikh Mohammed´s record as a mountaineer included the following achievements:

- Mount Kilimanjaro, Tanzania - 5895 meters (March 2010)
- Mont Blanc, France - 4810 meters (September 2011)
- Mount Vinson, Antarctica - 4892 meters (December 2012)
- Mount Elbrus, Russia - 5642 meters (August 2012)
- Mount Kosciuszko, Australia - 2228 meters (October 2012)
- Mount Aconcagua, Argentina - 6962 meters (January 2013)
- Mount Everest, Nepal/Tibet - 8850 meters (May 2013)
- Carstensz Pyramid, Indonesia - 4882 meters (October 2024)
- Denali, United States - 6144 meters (May 2016)
- Mount Ama Dablam, Nepal - 6812 meters (November 2020)

== Philanthropy ==
Al Thani climbed as a brand ambassador for Reach Out To Asia, state-led non-profit organization and part of the Qatar Foundation, that raises funds to uplift Asia and parts of the Middle East. Al Thani's goal was to raise one million dollars for education projects in Nepal.

Sheikh Mohammed also successfully led from 2 to 12 October 2014, the "Elevate to Educate" fundraising trip for a group of 12 young Qataris to the Summit of Kilimanjaro.

== Management and leadership ==
Al Thani is a Doha-based entrepreneur and motivational public speaker. In August 2007, Al Thani founded the travel website Musafir.com and Twisted Olive, a contemporary bistro with modern comfort food, inside Burj Doha, Qatar in 2020 as well as Altitude Elite, a boutique personalized-training studio in Lusail, Qatar in 2019.

Sheikh Mohammed is the president of the 3-2-1 Qatar Olympic and Sports Museum, which is also the first Arab museum to join the Olympic Museums Network.

=== Vodafone Qatar ===
Sheikh Mohammed served as a board member of Vodafone Qatar from year 2013-2016.

=== Air Arabia ===
In 2011 he became part of the board of directors of Air Arabia alongside his father Sheikh Abdullah bin Mohammed al Thani.

=== Chairmanships ===
Sheikh Mohammed held several Chairmanships, which include:

- Air Arabia
- Gamma Aviation Middle East
- AM Holding Company
- SASCO
- Santos International Company
- Ascent Advertising Company
- Universal Tourism Company
- Musafir Holding

Memberships

- Young Presidents’ Organization (YPO) Qatar Chapter - 2018
- The Explorers Club - 2016

== Sharjan administration ==
In the field of political administration, Sheikh Mohammed was appointed as Director General of the Sharjah Statistics Centre in January 2012. He also served as a chairman of the Department of Community Development of the Emirate of Sharjah and member of the Executive Council of the Emirate of Sharjah, being appointed by his granduncle Emir Sultan bin Muhammad Al-Qasimi of Sharjah. He was notwithstanding this appointed by his granduncle as the head of his office at the American University of Sharjah.

== Filmography ==
Al Thani is featured in The Seventh Summit, a documentary that follows a group of men and one woman in their attempt to make it to the top of Denali in Alaska. Among the climbers are Qatar’s own Sheikh Mohammed Al-Thani and Raed Zadan, respectively the first Qatari and the first Palestinian to climb Mount Everest; Iranian Massoud Kalafji; and Suzanne Al Houby, the first Arab woman to scale Everest.

He is also featured in Seal of Approval, which follows the Arabs with Altitude as they summit Mount Everest.

Al Thani made a documentary on the COVID-19 pandemic impact on the Nepali people who rely on the mountaineering industry.

== See also ==
- Hassan bin Mohamed bin Ali Al Thani, uncle
- Ahmed Al-Maktoum, Emirati royal with a sports career
