= Zed Al Refai =

Kuwaiti climber (born 1966)

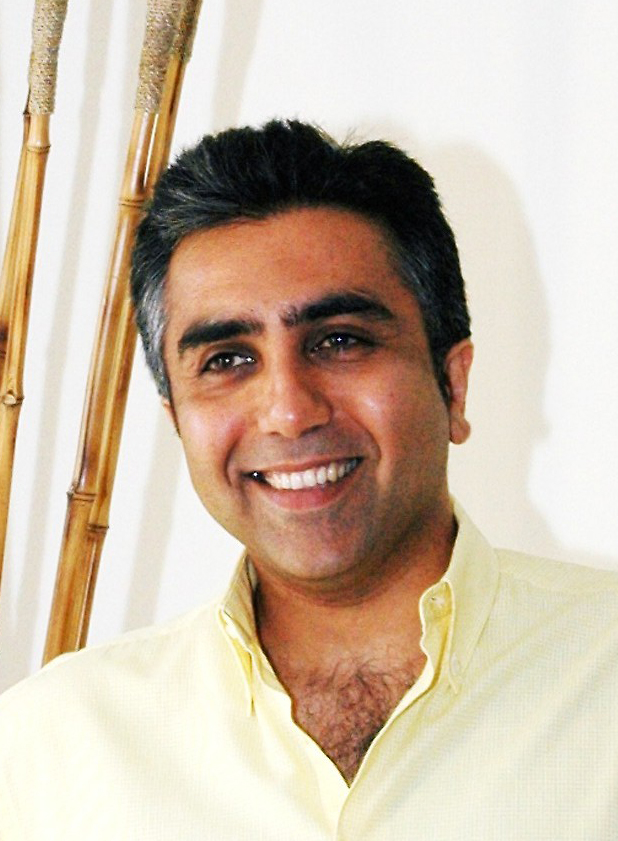
- Zed Al Refai
- Born: October 28, 1966 (age 59); Kuwait
- Occupations: Mountaineer and coffee merchant
- Website: www.foreverest.com

Zed "Zeddy" Al Refai (born October 28, 1966) is a Kuwaiti climber. He was the first Arab to climb Mount Everest and the 46th person to climb all seven highest summits in the seven continents of the world.

== Biography ==
Al Refai spent part of his childhood in the US and attended university at institutions in Florida, New Jersey, and Pennsylvania. He spent holidays trekking in New England, the Rockies, and the Pacific Northwest. In the mid-1990s, he traveled to Nepal and was captivated by the Himalayas and Mount Everest. Mountains he has summited include Mount McKinley in Alaska - North America's highest mountain -, Elbrus, the Carstensz Pyramid in Indonesia, Everest, Kilimanjaro, Mont Blanc, the Vinson Massif in Antarctica (where he reached the summit on January 13, 2004), and, to complete the Seven Summits challenge, Aconcagua in Argentina (where he reached on February 5, 2004).

Al Refai is director of the Arabian Mountaineering and Alpine Climbing Club, an organization founded in an attempt to popularise mountain climbing among people in the Middle East.

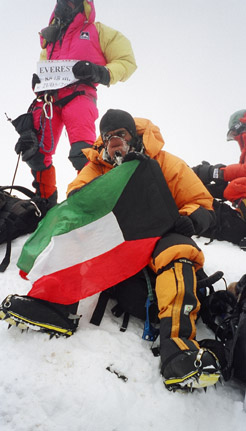
Zed Al Refai - Everest Summit

== The Seven Summits ==
- 1999: Denali
- 2000: Carstensz Pyramid
- 2000: Elbrus
- 2001: Kilimanjaro
- 2001: Mont Blanc
- 2003: Everest
- 2004: Vinson Massif
- 2004: Aconcagua
- 2005: Mount Kosciuszko
