= Sherpa (surname) =

Nepali surname

Sherpa is a surname originating from the Himalayan region. The name derives from the Sherpa language words ཤར shar ("east") and པ pa ("people"), which refer to the geographical origin of the Sherpa people in eastern Tibet.

== Notable people ==
A

- Ang Dorje Sherpa, Nepali mountaineer
- Ang Kami Sherpa, Nepali mountaineer
- Ang Rita Sherpa, Nepali mountaineer
- Ang Tshering Sherpa, Nepali entrepreneur
- Ang Tshering Sherpa, Nepali mountaineer
- Apa Sherpa, Nepali mountaineer

B

- Babu Chiri Sherpa, Nepali mountaineer
- Bir Radha Sherpa, Indian dancer

C

- Chhang Dawa Sherpa, Nepali mountaineer

D

- Dachhiri Sherpa, Nepali cross-country skier and runner
- Dawa Steven Sherpa, Nepali entrepreneur and environmentalist
- Dawa Yangzum Sherpa, Nepali mountaineer

K

- Kami Sherpa, Nepali mountaineer
- Kripasur Sherpa, Nepali politician
- Kushang Sherpa, Indian mountaineer

L

- Lhakpa Sherpa, Nepali mountaineer
- Lopsang Jangbu Sherpa, Nepali mountaineer
- Lucky Sherpa, Nepali politician and social activist

M

- Mingma Dorchi Sherpa, Nepali mountaineer
- Mingma Gyabu Sherpa, Nepali mountaineer
- Mingma Narbu Sherpa, Indian politician
- Mingma Sherpa, Nepali mountaineer

N

- Nawang Gombu Sherpa, Indian mountaineer
- Nawang Sherpa, Nepali mountaineer
- Ngima Gelu Sherpa, Nepali filmmaker
- Nilu Doma Sherpa, Nepali filmmaker
- Nimdoma Sherpa, Nepali mountaineer

P

- Pasang Lhamu Sherpa, Nepali mountaineer
- Pasang Lhamu Sherpa Akita, Nepali mountaineer
- Phu Dorjee Sherpa, Nepali mountaineer
- Pem Dorjee Sherpa, Nepali mountaineer
- Pema Diki Sherpa, Nepali mountaineer
- Pemba Doma Sherpa, Nepali mountaineer
- Pratima Sherpa, Nepali golfer

S

- Sanu Sherpa, Nepali mountaineer
- Sonam Gyalchhen Sherpa, Nepali politician
- Sonam Sherpa, Indian guitarist
- Sungdare Sherpa, Nepali mountaineer

T

- Tashi Lakpa Sherpa, Nepali mountaineer
- Tenjen Sherpa, Nepali mountaineer
- Tsering Rhitar Sherpa, Nepali filmmaker

== See also ==
- Sherpa people
- Sherpa (disambiguation)
