= List of Mount Everest records =

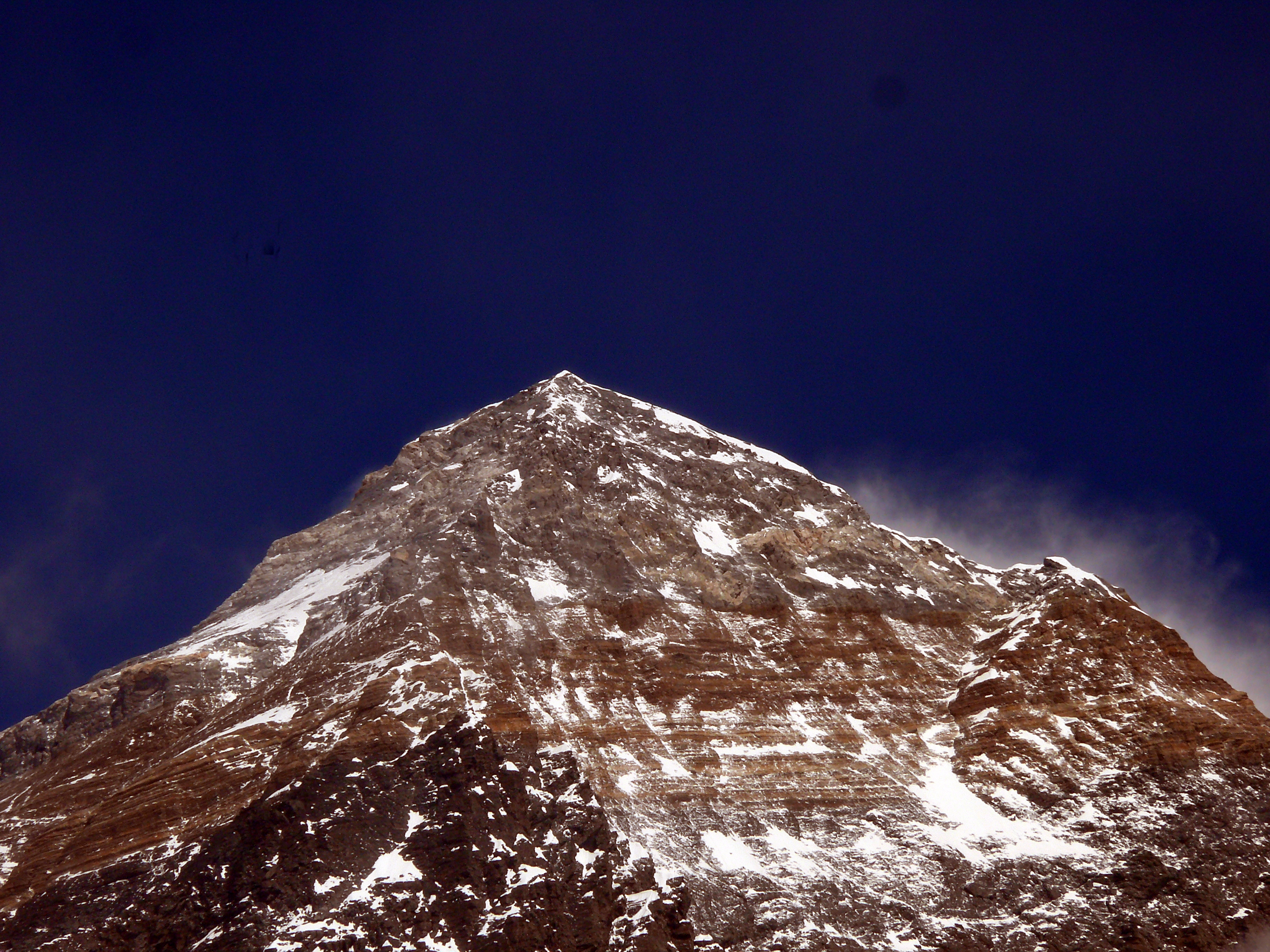
From Kala Patthar, west of Everest looking the South West face primarily

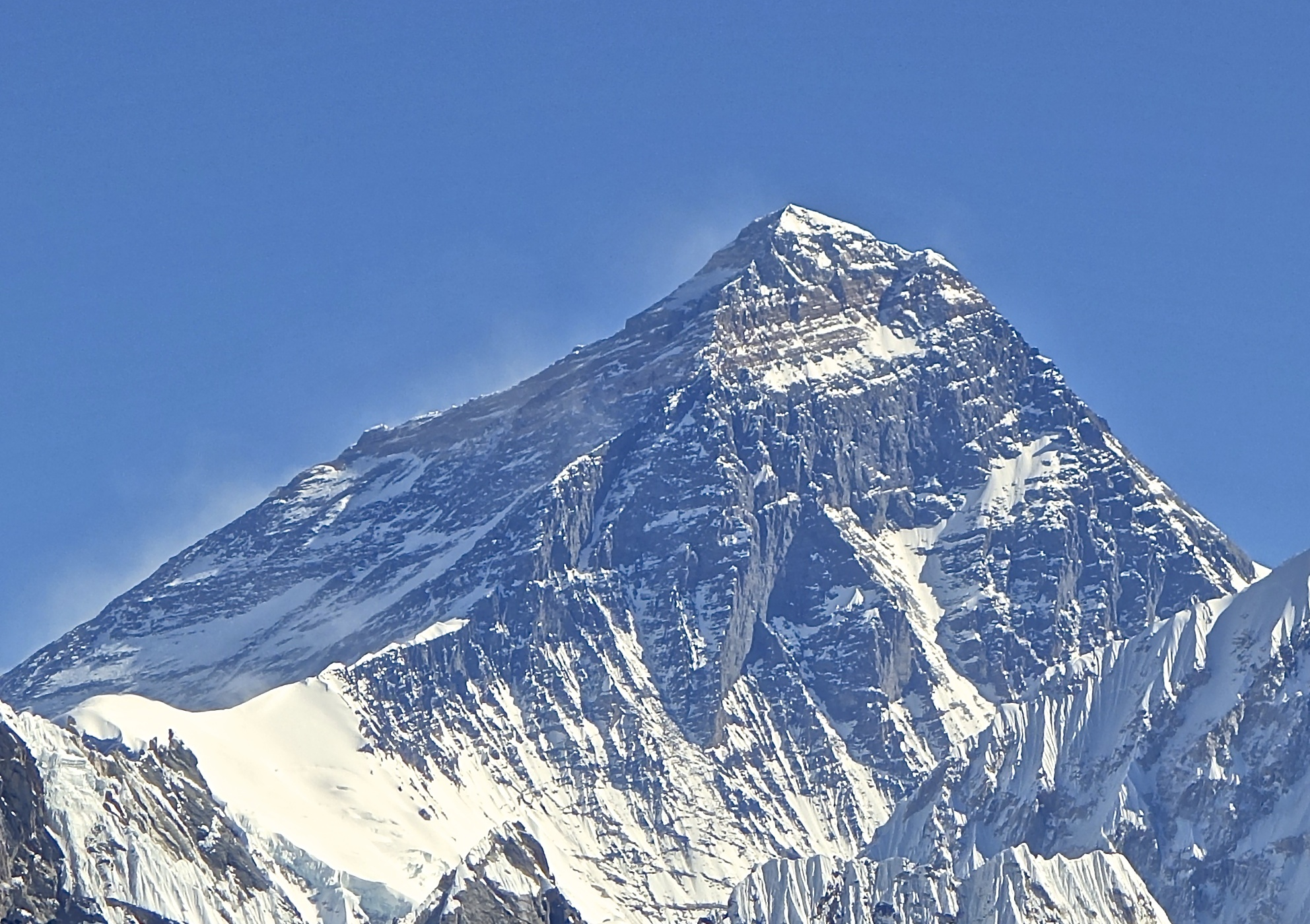
Mount Everest from Gokyo Ri, showing a little more of the North face

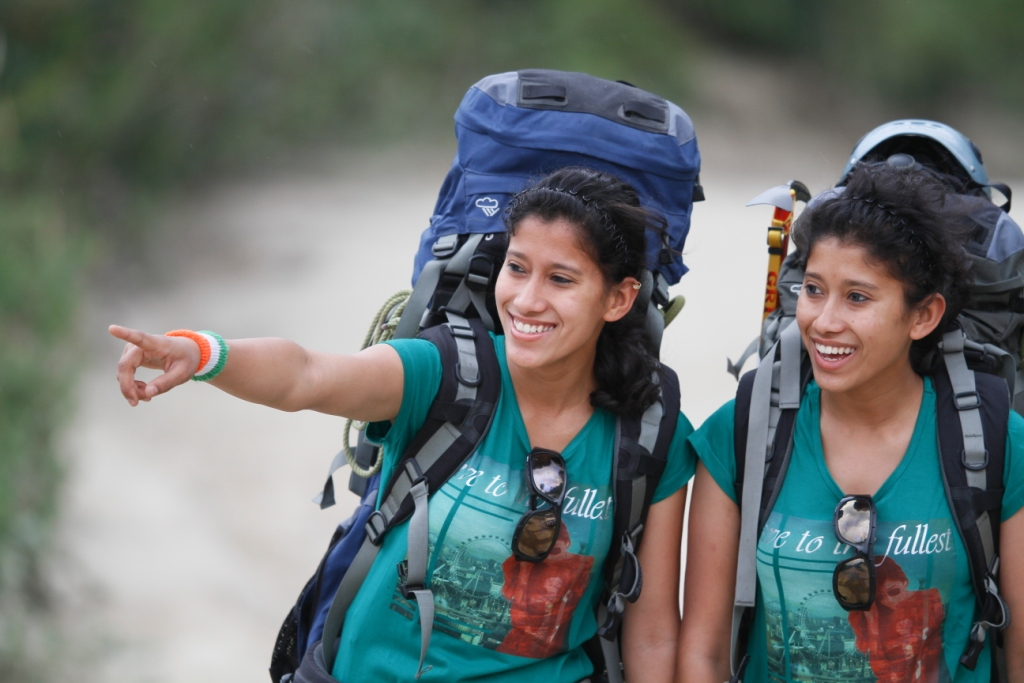
Tashi and Nungshi were the first twins to summit Mount Everest together.

This article lists different records related to Mount Everest. One of the most commonly sought after records is a "summit", meaning to reach the highest elevation point on Mount Everest.

== Records ==
=== Most summits ===
Record name	Record	Holder	Nation	Date	Ref.
Highest number of times to reach the summit	32	Kami Rita Sherpa	Nepal	May 17, 2026	

=== Other number of times records ===
Record name	Record	Holder	Nation	Date	Ref.
Most ascents by a woman	11	Lhakpa Sherpa	Nepal	May 17, 2026	
Most summits without supplemental oxygen	10	Ang Rita	Nepal	May 23, 1996	
Most summits by a foreigner (non-Nepali)	20	Kenton Cool	United Kingdom	22 May 2026	
Most ascents by a foreign woman	6	Melissa Arnot	United States		

=== Most times per nation ===
Record name	Record	Holder	Nation	Date	Ref.
Overall for Nepal	32	Kami Rita Sherpa	Nepal		
Overall for the United Kingdom	20	Kenton Cool	United Kingdom		
Overall for the United States	16	Garrett Madison	United States		
Overall for Argentina	13	Guillermo "Willie" Benegas	Argentina		
Overall for Japan	11	Hiroyuki Kuraoka	Japan		
Overall for New Zealand	10	Mark Woodward	New Zealand		

=== First to summit a certain number of times ===
Record name	Record	Holder	Nation	Date	Ref.
First climbers confirmed as having reached the summit	Summited	Edmund Hillary and Tenzing Norgay	New Zealand; Nepal	29 May 1953	
First woman to summit once	Summited	Junko Tabei	Japan	16 May 1975	
First man to summit twice	2	Nawang Gombu	India	1963, 1965	
First woman to summit twice	2	Santosh Yadav	India	1992, 1993	
First man to summit three times	3 by 1982	Sungdare Sherpa	Nepal		
First woman to summit three times	3 by 2003	Lhakpa Sherpa	Nepal		
First man to summit 4 times	4 by 1985	Sungdare Sherpa	Nepal		
First woman to summit 4 times	4 by 2004	Lhakpa Sherpa	Nepal		
First man to summit 5 times	5 by 1988	Sungdare Sherpa	Nepal		
First woman to summit 5 times	5 by 2005	Lhakpa Sherpa	Nepal		
First man to summit 6 times	6 by 1990	Ang Rita	Nepal		
First woman to summit 6 times	6 by 2006	Lhakpa Sherpa	Nepal		
First man to summit 7 times	7 by 1992	Ang Rita	Nepal		
First woman to summit 7 times	7 by 2016	Lhakpa Sherpa	Nepal		
First person to summit 8 times	8 by 1993	Ang Rita	Nepal		
First person to summit 9 times	9 by 1995	Ang Rita	Nepal		
First woman to summit 9 times	9 by 2018	Lhakpa Sherpa	Nepal		
First person to summit 10 times	10 by 1996	Ang Rita	Nepal		
First woman to summit 10 times	10 by 2022	Lhakpa Sherpa	Nepal		
First person to summit 11 times	11 by 2000	Apa Sherpa	Nepal		
First person to summit 12-21 times	21 by 2011	Apa Sherpa	Nepal		
First person to summit 22 times	22 by 2018	Kami Rita Sherpa	Nepal		
First person to summit 23 times	23 by 2019	Kami Rita Sherpa	Nepal		
First person to summit 24-32 times	32 by 2026	Kami Rita Sherpa	Nepal		

=== Double summiting records ===
Record	Holder	Nation	Date	Ref.
First dual ascent made by a woman on Mount Everest summit within five days	Anshu Jamsenpa	India	21 May 2017	

=== Fastest ascents ===
Record name	Record	Holder	Nation	Date	Ref.
Fastest ascent from Everest South Base Camp with supplemental oxygen	9 hours 55 minutes 43 s	Tyler C. Andrews	United States	28 May 2026	
Fastest ascent without supplemental oxygen and fastest ascent from Everest North Base Camp	16 hours and 45 minutes	Hans Kammerlander	Italy	24 May 1996	
Longest stay on the summit	21 hours	Babu Chiri Sherpa	Nepal	6 May 1999	
Fastest woman to climb the summit	14 hours 31 Minutes	Phunjo Jhangmu Lama	Nepal	26 May 2024	

=== Deadliest accident ===
Record name	Record	Date	Ref.
Most deaths in one day at Everest	22	April 25, 2015	

=== Oldest summiters ===
This table shows the progression of the record for oldest male summiter, as well as some additional examples of aged summiters for comparison

Record	Holder	Nation	Date	Ref.
80 years, 224 days	Yūichirō Miura (b. 1932)	Japan	23 May 2013	
76 years, 340 days	Min Bahadur Sherchan (b. 1931)	Nepal	2008	
75 years, 227 days	Yūichirō Miura	Japan	2008	
75 years, 134 days	Arthur Bennet Muir	USA	23 May 2021	
71 years, 61 days	Katsusuke Yanagisawa	Japan	22 May 2007	
70 years, 225 days	Takao Arayama	Japan	May 2006	
70 years, 222 days	Yūichirō Miura	Japan	May 2003	
66 years, 139 days	Mario Fernando Villagran	Ecuador	15 May 2022	
66 years,	Mario Curnis (b. 1936)	Italy	24 May 2002	
65 years, 176 days	Tomiyasu Ishikawa	Japan	17 May 2002	
64 years	Sherman Bull	United States	25 May 2001	
63 years, 311 days	Toshio Yamamoto	Japan	2000	
62 years, 257 days	Aziz Abdileilidaghi	Iran	14 May 2022	
60 years, 161 days	Lev Sarkisov	Georgia	12 May 1999	
60 years, 160 days	Ramon Balanca (Blanco) Suarez (b. 1933)	Venezuela	1993	
55 years	Richard Bass (b. 1929)	United States	April 1985	
50 years	Chris Bonington (b. 1934)	United Kingdom	April 1985	
50 years	Jozef Psotka (b. 1934, died on descent)	Czechoslovakia	October 1984	
50 years, 118 days	Gerhard Schmatz (b. 1929)	West Germany	October 1979	
49 years, 52 days	Pierre Mazeaud (b. 1929)	France	15 Oct 1978	
42 years, 6 months	Sonam Gyatso (b. 1922)	India	22 May 1965	
39 years	Tenzing Norgay (b. 1914)	Nepal	29 May 1953	

Tenzing Norgay was older than his climbing partner Sir Edmund Hillary, as the first confirmed climbers to reach the summit, they became the modern-day starting point for the oldest and youngest climbers respectively.

This table shows the progression of the record for oldest female summiter.

Record	Holder	Nation	Date	Ref.
73 years, 180 days	Tamae Watanabe	Japan	19 May 2012	
63 years, 297 days	Susanne Mueller Zantop	Germany	17 May 2018	
63 years, 177 days	Tamae Watanabe	Japan	16 May 2002	
54 years	Maria Paz Valenzuela	Chile	19 May 2018	
50 years	Anna Czerwińska	Poland	22 May 2000	
47 years, 98 days (died in the 1996 Mount Everest disaster)	Yasuko Namba	Japan	10 May 1996	
47 years, 21 days	Mary Lefever	United States	19 May 1993	
39 years, 228 days (died on descent)	Hannelore Schmatz	Germany	10 October 1979	
35 years, 236 days	Junko Tabei	Japan	16 May 1975	

Junko Tabei was the first woman to reach the summit, and thus set the initial records for both oldest and youngest female summiter.

=== Youngest male summiters ===
Due to some variations in record keeping, there may be some variation in the examples.

Record name	Record	Holder	Nation	Date	Ref.
Youngest person to climb Mount Everest	13 years, 10 months, 10 days old	Jordan Romero	United States	22 May 2010	
Next youngest person and youngest female	13 years, 11 months, 15 days old	Malavath Purna (female)	India	25 May 2014	
Next youngest person	15 years, 9 months old	Ming Kipa Sherpa (female)	Nepal	22 May 2003	

==== Youngest female ====
Record name	Record	Holder	Nation	Date	Ref.
Youngest girl to climb Mount Everest	13 years, 11 months, 15 days	Malavath Purna	India	25 May 2014	
Youngest girl to summit Everest up to that time	15 years, 9 months	Ming Kipa Sherpa	Nepal	22 May 2003	
Youngest woman to summit Everest up to that time	19 years 35 days	Dicky Dolma	India	10 May 1993	
Youngest woman to summit up to that time	22 years, 273 days	Kim Soon-jo	South Korea	10 May 1993	
Youngest woman to summit up to that time	24 years, 215 days	Santosh Yadav	India	12 May 1992	
Youngest woman to summit up to that time	27 years 5 days	Lydia Bradey	New Zealand	14 October 1988	
Youngest woman to summit up to that time	29-year 2 days	Sharon Wood	Canada	20 May 1986	
Youngest woman to summit up to that time	30 years 28 days	Bachendri Pal	India	23 May 1984	
First (so both the youngest and oldest) woman to summit up to that time	35 years 236 days	Junko Tabei	Japan	16 May 1975	

See also

- Nimdoma Sherpa
- Samantha Larson
- Nima Chhamzi Sherpa, summited May 19, 2012 at the age of 16.

=== Firsts ===
Record name	Record	Holder	Nation	Date	Ref.
First climbers confirmed as having reached the summit	Summited	Sir Edmund Hillary and Tenzing Norgay	New Zealand, Nepal	29 May 1953	
First woman to reach the summit	Summited	Junko Tabei	Japan	16 May 1975	
First ascent without supplemental oxygen	Summited	Reinhold Messner and Peter Habeler	Italy, Austria	8 May 1978	
First winter ascent	Summited	Krzysztof Wielicki and Leszek Cichy	Poland	17 February 1980	
First solo ascent, simultaneously first solo ascent without supplemental oxygen	Summited	Reinhold Messner	Italy	20 August 1980	
First paraglider descent from summit	Summited, descended by paraglider	Jean-Marc Boivin	France	26 September 1988	
First American woman to summit	Summited	Stacy Allison	United States	29 September 1988	
First British woman to summit	Summited	Rebecca Stephens	United Kingdom	17 May 1993	
First female ascent without supplemental oxygen	Summited	Lydia Bradey	New Zealand	14 October 1988	
First married couple to summit	Summited	Andrej Štremfelj and Marija Štremfelj	Slovenia	7 October 1990	
First Nepalese woman to summit (but died while descending)	Summited	Pasang Lhamu Sherpa	Nepal	22 April 1993	
First Nepalese woman to summit and not die descending	Summited	Lhakpa Sherpa	Nepal	18 May 2000	
First full descent on skis	Summited, descended by skis	Davo Karničar	Slovenia	7 October 2000	
First descent on a snowboard	Summited, descended by snowboard	Marco Siffredi	France	May 2001	
First person to reach the summit from three different routes (South Col., North Face and Khangshung Face)	Summited by 3 routes	Kushang Sherpa	India	1993- 2003	
First black man to summit	Summited	Sibusiso Vilane	South Africa	26 May 2003	
First two people to marry on top of Mount Everest	Summited, married	Pem Dorjee and Moni Mulepati	Nepal	30 May 2005	
First black woman and first black American to summit	Summited	Sophia Danenberg	United States	19 May 2006	
First sisters to summit together	Summited	Darija and Iris Bostjančić	Croatia	5 May 2009	
First twins to climb Mount Everest together	Summited	Tashi and Nungshi Malik	India	19 May 2013	
First to climb the Everest Triple Crown	Summited	Kenton Cool and Dorje Gyalgen	United Kingdom,Nepal	21 May 2013	
First Kazakh woman to summit	Summited	Anar Burasheva	Kazakhstan	12 May 2024	
First Slovakian woman to summit	Summited	Lucia Janičová	Slovakia	12 May 2024	
First full descent on skis without supplemental oxygen	Summited, descended by skis	Andrzej Bargiel	Poland	22 September 2025	

=== Disabled summiters ===
Record name	Record	Holder	Nation	Date	Ref.
Amputated foot	Summited Everest	Tom Whittaker	United States	27 May 1998	
Blind	Summited Everest via South Col	Erik Weihenmayer	United States	25 May 2001	
Cystic fibrosis	Summited Everest	Nick Talbot	United Kingdom	May 2016	
Left arm amputated	Summited Everest	Gary Guller	United States	23 May 2003	
Double leg amputee	Summited Everest	Mark Inglis	New Zealand	15 May 2006	
Right leg amputee	Summited Everest	Nelson Cardona	Colombia	17 May 2010	
With no fingers	Summited Everest	Kim Hong-Bin	South Korea	16 May 2007	
Double arm amputee	Summited Everest	Sudarshan Gautam	Nepal Canada	20 May 2013	
Female amputee (one leg)	Summited Everest	Arunima Sinha	India	21 May 2013	
Hemophiliac	Summited Everest	Chris Bombardier	United States	22 May 2017	
Type I diabetes	Summited Everest	Geri Winkler	Austria	20 May 2006	
Multiple sclerosis first woman	Summited Everest	Lori Schneider	United States	23 May 2009	
Multiple sclerosis first man	Summited Everest	Niels van Buren	The Netherlands	May 2016	
Granulomatosis with polyangiitis and partially blind	Summited Everest	Cindy Abbott	United States	23 May 2010	
Crohn's disease and ostomy	Summited South Summit of Everest	Rob Hill	Canada	25 May 2010	
Cancer survivor (Hodgkins disease and Askin's sarcoma); one lung	Summit	Sean Swarner	United States	16 May 2002	
Blind	Summited Everest via North Col	Andy Holzer	Austria	21 May 2017	
First cancer patient	Summited Everest	Ian Toothill	United Kingdom	27 May 2017	
Double leg amputee and cancer survivor (lymphoma)	Summited Everest	Xia Boyu	China	14 May 2018	
Deaf	Summited Everest	Satoshi Tamura	Japan	21 May 2016	

=== Other ===
Record name	Record	Holder	Nation	Date	Ref.
Houston-Mount Everest Flight Expedition (overflight of summit)	8848m	David McIntyre and Sir Douglas Douglas-Hamilton	United Kingdom	April 3, 1933	
Highest of rotorcraft landing and take-off	8848m	Didier Delsalle	France	May, 2005	

- Elizabeth Hawley, has kept records for Everest from 1960s to at least 2015. (She died in January 2018 at age 94)
- Nations with most summits, U.K - 481 as of 2011.

=== Skydives Over Mount Everest ===
Record Name	Holder	Nation	Date	Ref.
Highest Number of Solo Jumps	Wendy Elizabeth Smith	New Zealand	October, 2008	
First Solo Skydiver	Wendy Elizabeth Smith	New Zealand	October, 2008	
First Tandem Jump	Tom Noonan - Lucie Fenton	USA - UK	October, 2008	
First American Solo skydive	Omar Alhegelan	USA	October, 2008	
First Australian Highest Tandem	Steve Hennessey	Australia	October, 2008	
First Woman to Summit Everest and Skydive Above it	Maya Gurung	Nepal	October, 2008	
First Nepali Woman Tandem Jump	Maya Gurung	Nepal	October, 2008	
First Iraqi Solo Skydiver	Fareed Lafta	Iraq	October, 2008	
First Swedish Solo Skydiver	Herman S. Duscher	Sweden	October, 2008	
First Danish Highest Tandem Jump	Per Wimmer	Denmark	October, 2008	
First Pakistani Highest Tandem Jump	Namira Salim	Pakistan	October, 2008	
First Belgian Solo Skydive	Christophe De Pauw	Belgium	October, 2008	
First South African Solo Skydive	Adolphe Botha	South Africa	October, 2008	
First Nepali Tandem Jump	Nima Tamang	Nepal	October, 2008	
First Arab Solo Skydive	Naseer Alneyadi	UAE	October, 2008	
First Canadian Solo Skydive	Neil Jones	Canada	October, 2008	
First father & Son Duo Tandem Jumps	Scott Diesel - Lou Diesel	UK	October, 2008	
First British Woman Solo Skydive	Holly Budge	UK	October, 2008	
First Person With Gender Reassignment (M to F) Tandem Jump	Kate Craig-Wood	UK	October, 2008	
First Indian Solo Skydive	Jai Kishan	India	October, 2009	
Highest Landing Woman Solo Skydiver (17,192 ft)	Wendy Elizabeth Smith	New Zealand	November, 2009	
Oldest Solo Skydive (65 years old)	Roger Hoe	UK	October, 2010	
Oldest Tandem Jump (70 years old)	Klaus Gachter	USA	October, 2010	
Highest Altitude Tandem Jump (30,000 ft)	Tom Noonan - Nick Leventis	USA - UK	October, 2010	
First German Solo Skydive	Peter Rotelle	Germany	October, 2010	
First Disabled Person Tandem Jump (Multiple Sclerosis)	Marc Kopp	France	October, 2013	
Youngest Tandem Jump (18 years old)	James George	UK	October, 2013	
First Czech Republic Solo Skydive	Libor Fryzek	Czech Republic	October, 2013	
First Solo Wingsuit Skydive	Ossie Khan	Australia	November, 2014	
First Argentinian Solo Skydive	Pablo Parazoli	Argentina	November, 2016	
First Male to Summit Everest and Skydive Above it	Bibek Pandey	Nepal	November, 2016	
First Moroccan Solo Skydive	Anas Bekkali	Morocco	November, 2017	
Largest Floating Flag	Anas Bekkali	Morocco	November, 2017	
First Indonesian Solo Skydive	Naila Novaranti	Indonesia	November, 2018	
Highest Landing Solo Skydive (20,160 ft)	Paul-Henry de Baere	France	May, 2019	
First Disabled Person Solo Skydive (Paraplegic)	Osama Najaf	Kuwait	November, 2019	
Highest Landing Solo Skydive - Paraplegic Person (12,402 ft)	Osama Najaf	Kuwait	November, 2019	
Largest Floating Kuwaiti Flag	Osama Najaf	Kuwait	November, 2019	
Highest Landing Solo Skydive - Double Amputee (12,402 ft)	Al Hodgson	UK	November, 2019	
First Arab Woman Solo Skydiver	Aliaa Khaja	Kuwait	November, 2019	
First Russian Woman Solo Skydiver	Nadia Solovyeva	Russia	November, 2019	
First Russian Solo Skydiver	Anton Gilev	Russia	November, 2019	
First Danish Solo Skydiver	Kim Bo Larsen	Denmark	November, 2019	

=== Nepali records ===
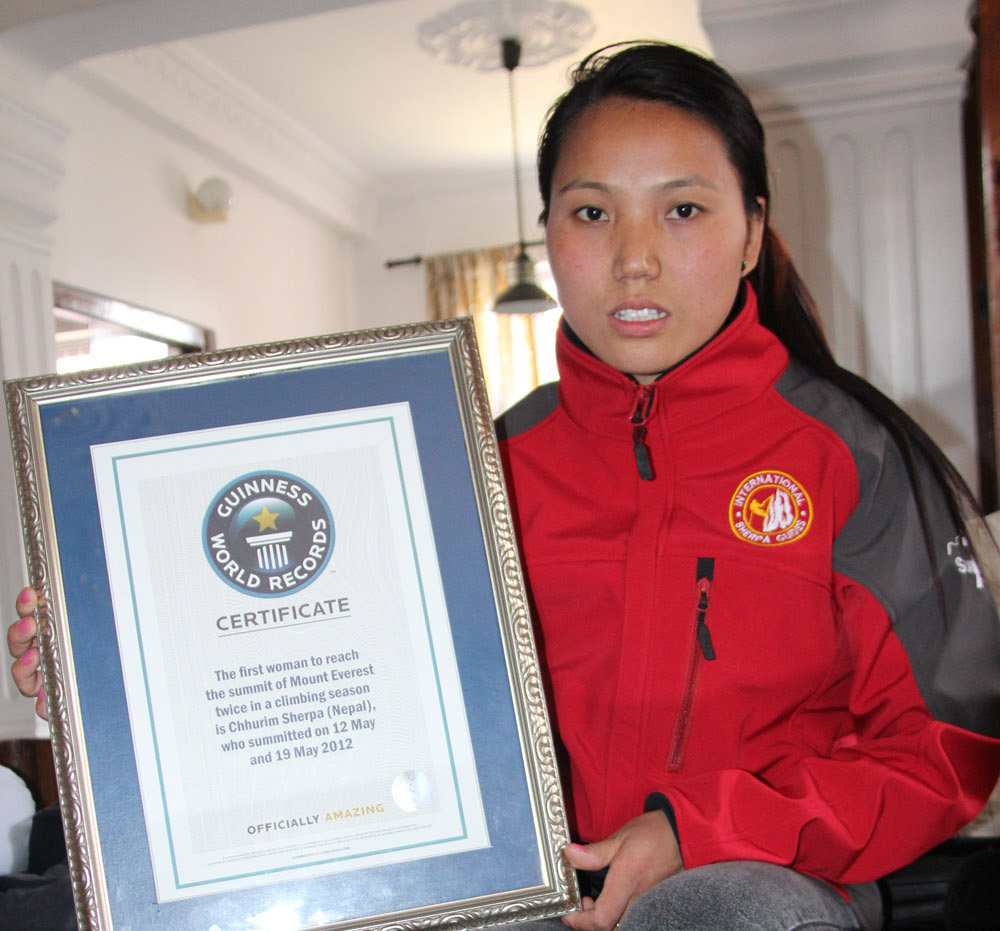
Chhurim summited twice in May 2012, the first woman to summit twice in a season.

Many Mount Everest records are held by Nepali, especially those from the Sherpa region.

- On 11 May 2011, Apa Sherpa successfully reached the summit of Everest for the twenty-first time, breaking his own record for the most successful ascents. He first climbed Mount Everest in 1989 at the age of 29.
  - Phurba Tashi Sherpa (also 21 times)
  - Kami Rita Sherpa (24 times by 2019)
- One famous Nepalese female mountaineer was Pasang Lhamu Sherpa, the first Nepali female climber to reach the summit of Everest, but who died during the descent. Another well-known woman Sherpa was the two-time Everest summiter Pemba Doma Sherpa, who died after falling from Lhotse on 22 May 2007.
- Nepali mountaineer Lhakpa Sherpa, the first Nepali female climber to reach the summit of Everest and descend from it, stood atop Everest 7 times by 2016 and 8 times by 2017, the most times for woman. She successfully completed her 11th record-breaking ascent of Everest in May 2026.
- Nima Jangmu Sherpa, 28, made the historic ascent on Mount Kanchenjunga on 23 May 2018 morning and became the only woman in the world to climb Nepal's three highest peaks (Mount Everest -14 May 2018, Mount Lhotse - 29 April 2018, Mount Kanchenjunga – 23 May 2018) above 8,000 metres in a single season within 25 days. She has also become the only Nepali woman to stand atop the world's third highest peak, Mount Kanchenjunga.

Other examples of noted Nepali Everest mountaineers:

- Temba Tsheri
- Nima Chhamzi Sherpa
- Nimdoma Sherpa
- Ming Kipa
- Chhurim

About names: Many Nepalese are only given one name, and are often named for a day of the week

One source of confusion was in record keeping was that the South side was essentially closed in 2014 due to an avalanche disrupting the Khumbu Icefall. So most of the summiters summited from the North side, except for a small group that flew a helicopter over the Khumbu Icefall, even though it was not open. This is why in 2016 Adrian Ballinger said on Instagram "9 Sherpa using supplemental oxygen became the first to summit on the South Side of Everest in the past 3 years" in 2016. The full Nepal route to the summit was not open in 2014 or in 2015, but there was a group that summited from the south side in 2014 as part of a Chinese team that used a helicopter to reach that area.

== Most summits in one day ==
For the mountain overall, the most in one day is May 23, 2019, when 358 reached the top. The previous record was May 19, 2012, when 179-234 reached the top.

== Everest base camp records ==
Records for non-summits such about the main Nepal-side Base camp:

Record name	Record	Owner	Nation	Date	Ref.
Fastest run from Lukla to Everest Base Camp (round trip)	23 hours 42 minutes 13 seconds	Tyler Andrews	United States	16 March 2020	
Fastest run from Everest Base Camp to Kathmandu	63 hours 8 minutes	Lizzy Hawker	United Kingdom	18 Apr 2013	
Youngest person to trek to Everest Base Camp	Aged 4 years and 1 month	Advit Golechha	India	2017	https://telanganatoday.com/hyderabads-4-yr-old-hoists-tricolour-at-everest-base-camp
Youngest person to ever be at the Base Camp	0 years and 11 months	Ksenia de Cos	Tri-Citizens of Spain, Ukraine, United States	May 2018	
Youngest brothers / siblings to trek to Everest Base Camp	Aged 6, 8, 11 years	James, Tobin and Aidan O'Donnell	United Kingdom	August 2016	
First person with Down's Syndrome to Everest Base Camp	15 years old	Eli Reimer	United States	2013	
First Belizean to trek to Everest Base Camp	34 years old	Nicholas Metzgen	Belize	April 2019	
Youngest Australian to trek to Everest Base Camp	9 years old	Oscar Squirrell	Australia	April 2017	
First person with cerebral palsy to trek to Everest Base Camp on horseback	27 years old	Max Stainton	United Kingdom	April 2018	

Some Everest-related marathons that start at Base camp or near Everest include the Everest Marathon, Tenzing Hillary Everest Marathon, and the Mount Everest Challenge Marathon.

== See also ==
- The Himalayan Database
- List of Mount Everest expeditions
- List of 20th-century summiters of Mount Everest
- List of Mount Everest summiters by number of times to the summit
- List of people who died climbing Mount Everest
- 2014 Nepal snowstorm disaster
- List of ski descents of Eight-Thousanders

== Notes ==
1.^aKazi Sherpa used supplemental oxygen on the descent.
