= Samantha Larson =

American mountain climber (born 1988)

- Born: October 7, 1988 (age 37)
- Education: Hughes Middle School; Long Beach Polytechnic High School; Stanford University
- Known for: Mountaineering
- Title: youngest person to have climbed the Seven Summits with both Carstensz and Kosciuszko
- Term: 2007–2011
- Predecessor: Rhys Miles Jones
- Successor: Jordan Romero
- Parent: Dave Larson
- Website: http://www.samanthalarson.com

Samantha Larson (born 1988) is an American mountain climber from Long Beach, California. On May 16, 2007, at the age of 18, she became temporarily the youngest non-Nepalese woman to summit Mount Everest. By reaching the top of Everest, she also became temporarily the youngest person to have climbed the Seven Summits (the "Bass list"), the tallest mountains on each of the seven continents. She and her father, David Larson, became the first father-daughter team to complete the Seven Summits. In August 2007 they climbed Carstensz Pyramid, thereby also completing the "Messner list" of the Seven Summits.

The Nepalese government said that she was the youngest foreigner ever to reach Everest's summit, but some climbing Web sites claim a 17-year-old boy from France did it in 1990. 15-year-old Ming Kipa from Nepal was the youngest ever to climb Everest.

Larson began climbing with her father, David Larson, while in the sixth grade at Hughes Middle School. They began the Seven Summits by climbing Mount Kilimanjaro in February 2001, when she was 12. Larson graduated from Long Beach Polytechnic High School in June 2006, deferring her freshman year at Stanford University for a year to train for the Everest climb.

Larson was nominated for an ESPY Award in 2007 and was on the Dare To Explore chapter on the March 2008 issue of National Geographic Kids. In 2009, she was also featured as one of Venus Zine's “25 under 25” list for her climbing achievements.

== See also ==
- List of Mount Everest records
- Melissa Arnot (Another American female climber)
