= Temba Tsheri =

Nepalese mountaineer (born 1985)

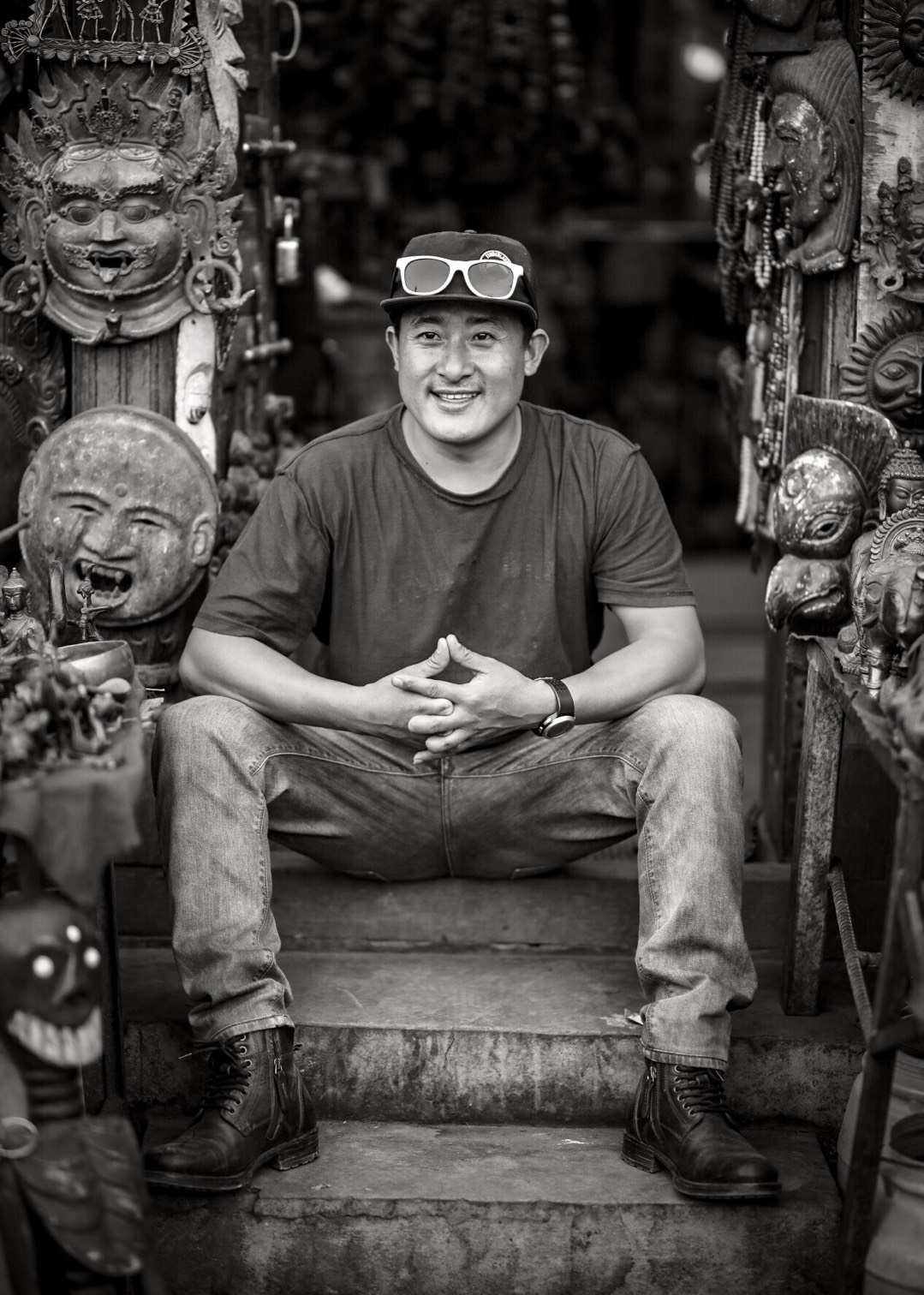
- Born: May 9, 1985 (age 41); Tasi Nam, Gaurisankar-5, Dolakha
- Education: Bachelor's Degree, Wuhan University
- Occupations: Mountaineer, businessman
- Years active: 1999–present
- Known for: Mountaineering
- Parent(s): Father Chhauwa Sherpa, Mother Lakpa Diki Sherpa
- Website: tembatsherisherpa.com

Temba Tsheri Sherpa (Nepali: तेम्बा छिरी; born May 9, 1985) is a Sherpa from Rolwaling Valley, Dolkha, Nepal. On May 23, 2001, at the age of 16 years, he became the youngest person to climb Mount Everest.

In 2003, this world record was broken again by Jordan Romero (age 13) in 2010. Temba remains the youngest Nepalese climber to summit Mount Everest from the Nepal side. Climber Ming Kipa, who summited in 2003 (age 15) is also Nepali, but climbed from the Chinese side of the mountain, because Nepal's government no longer gives climbing permits to anyone under 16.

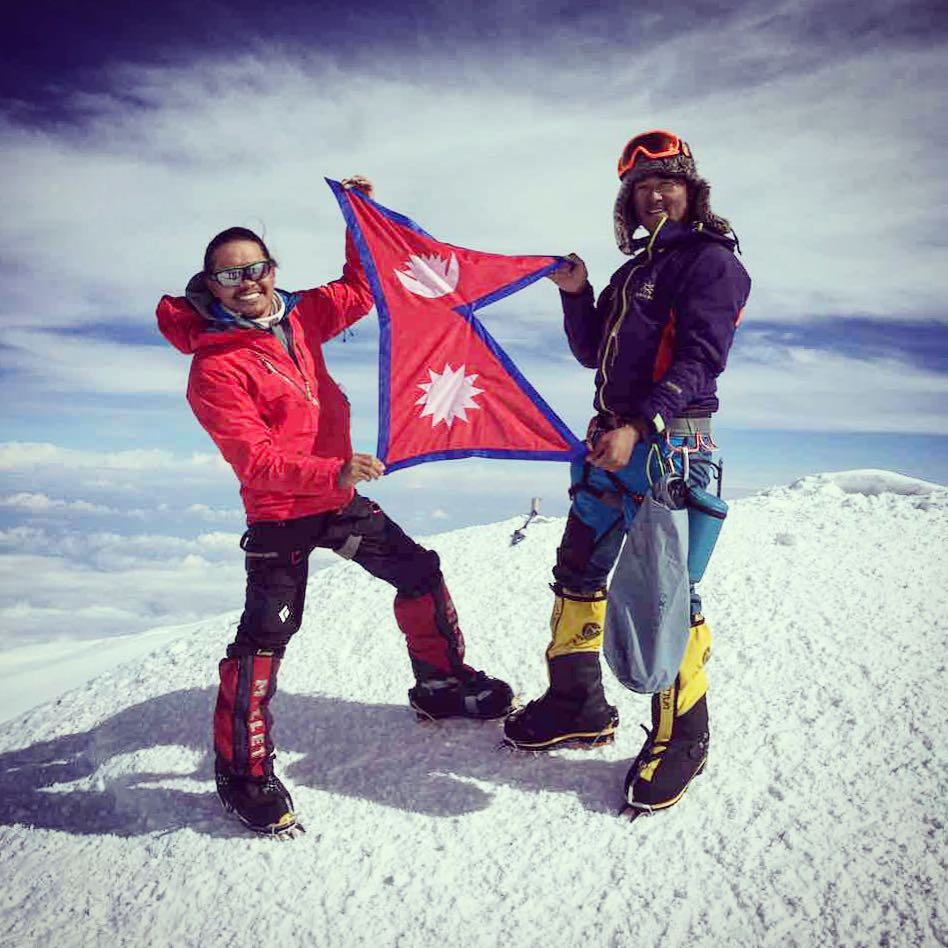
Temba Tsheri Sherpa (R) and Chhiring Dorje Sherpa holding the flag of Nepal on the top of Denali, 6168m above sea level. On 26 June 2015

The youth, who was still in school, lost five fingers to frostbite while attempting to climb from the south side in 2000. He made his successful ascent from the north side (Tibet) of Mount Everest in 2001. Temba was climbing with the International Everest Expedition.

In an interview in 2015 he noted that he had lost friends, equipment and houses as a result of the 2015 Nepal earthquakes.

He has spent his career in the trekking and guiding industry to help shape the future of mountain climbing in Nepal.

== Everest attempts ==
In 2000, Temba Tsheri made his first attempt to summit Mount Everest. He reached the Hillary step, approximately 22 meters below the summit but had to turn back due to exhaustion and bad weather. During this attempt he suffered severe frostbite and lost his five fingers.

The following year, shortly after celebrating his 16th birthday, he returned to Everest and climbed via North ridge from the Tibet side. On 23 may 2001, he successfully reached the summit, becoming the youngest person to summit the Everest at that time. He was later recognized by Guinness World Record for the achievement, though the record was later on broken by climber Jordan Romero. He remains the youngest Nepali to have summitted Everest from the Nepal side.

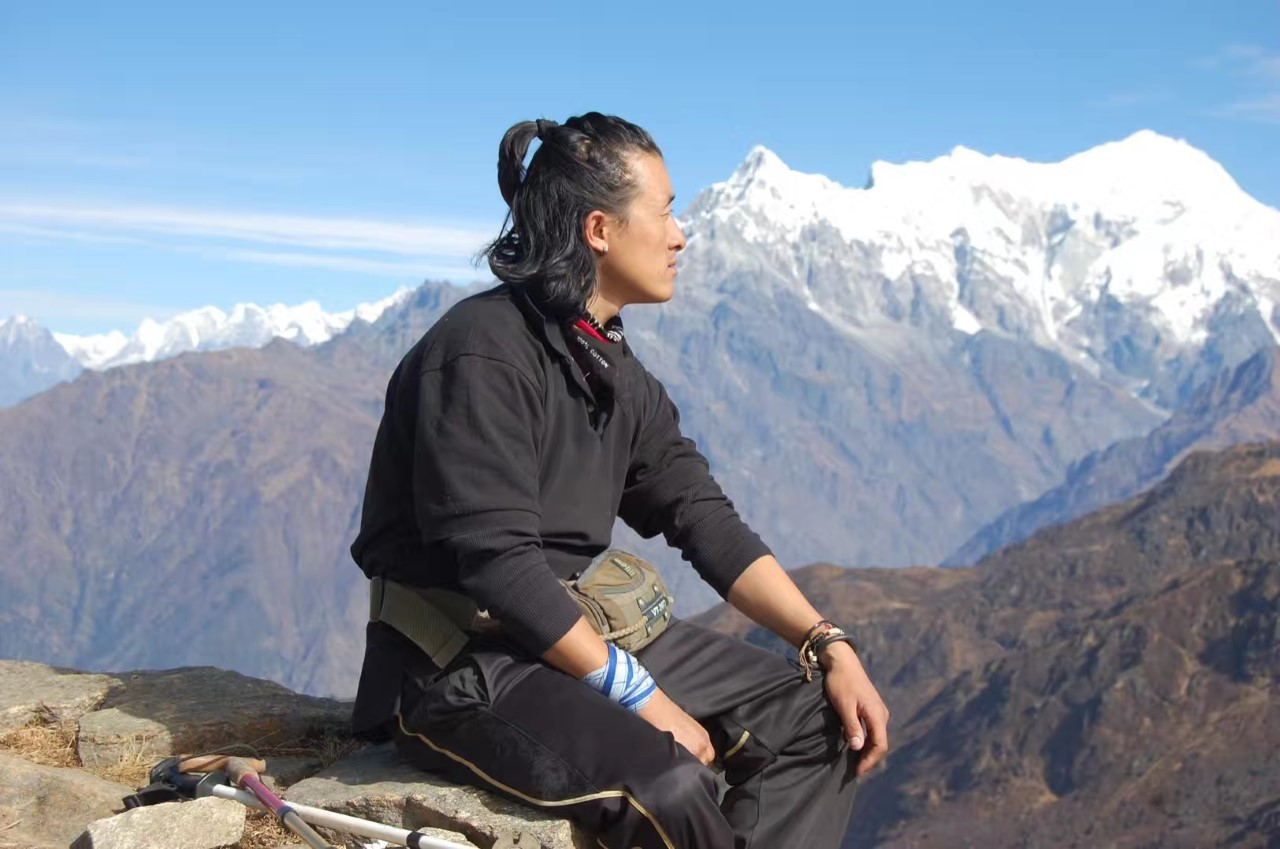
Temba Tsheri Sherpa, mountain background

== See also ==
- List of Mount Everest records
- List of world records from Nepal
- Ming Kipa
- Lhakpa Sherpa
