= Nimdoma Sherpa =

Youngest woman to summit Mount Everest

Nimdoma Sherpa (born 1991) from Gauri Sankar, Dolakha District is a Nepalese mountain climber. In 2008 she became the youngest woman to climb Mount Everest and in 2009 she joined the Seven Summits Women Team, a team of Nepalese women whose goal is to climb the Seven Summits.

== Early life ==
Nimdoma Sherpa was born into a poor Sherpa family in a remote Himalayan village in Nepal. At five years old, she began attending school through a school meals program run by the United Nations World Food Programme (WFP). Originally, her parents sent her to school for the opportunity to receive a healthy meal each day, but Nimdoma gradually became a high achiever and she moved to Kathmandu to attend a larger school. When she graduated from high school, she became the first in her family to do so.

== Mountaineering ==
After finishing high school, Nimdoma joined the First Inclusive Women's Sagarmatha Expedition, an all-female mountaineering team supported by the WFP. In May 2008, all ten team members successfully summited Mount Everest, making 16-year-old Nimdoma the youngest woman to have reached the summit until her record was broken in 2012. Her success on Everest was recounted in a children's book titled Snow Leopard, the Yeti and the Girl Who Climbed Mount Everest, published by the WFP to promote the use of school meals to reduce child hunger.

In 2009, Nimdoma and six of her Nepalese Sagarmatha Expedition teammates formed the Seven Summits Women Team, an all-female team whose goal is to climb the Seven Summits, the highest mountains of each continent. In addition to Nimdoma, the team members comprised Shailee Basnet, Pujan Acharya, Maya Gurung, Asha Kumari Singh, Pema Diki and Chunu Shrestha. Having already climbed Mount Everest, the team began their mission in 2010 with successful ascents of Mount Kosciuszko (Australia) and Mount Elbrus (Russia). In March 2013, they joined three Tanzanian women to climb Mount Kilimanjaro (Tanzania) in celebration of International Women's Day. In February 2014, Nimdoma and three other teammates reached the summit of Aconcagua (Argentina), their fifth mountain of the Seven Summits. The team plans to climb Denali (United States) and Vinson Massif (Antarctica) to complete the challenge by the end of 2015.

Nimdoma was one of the founders of Global Inclusive Adventures, a non-governmental organization started by the Seven Summits Women Team, which visits Nepalese schools to talk about their expeditions with the aim of inspiring young children. She is also the face of an advertising campaign for the WFP's School Feeding Program; she has expressed her gratitude to the WFP for "open[ing] the door of educational opportunities and help[ing] me to pursue my dream of climbing Everest". Stephen Anderson, the director of WFP Japan, has said that "Nimdoma is a shining example of what the WFP-supported school feeding programs can achieve by helping give needy children an education and a fighting chance of breaking the vicious cycle of hunger and poverty."

== See also ==
- List of Mount Everest records
- Lhakpa Sherpa
- Ming Kipa
- Dicky Dolma
