= Mahesh Raj Dahal =

Nepalese diplomat, media executive, and leadership consultant

- महेशराज दाहाल
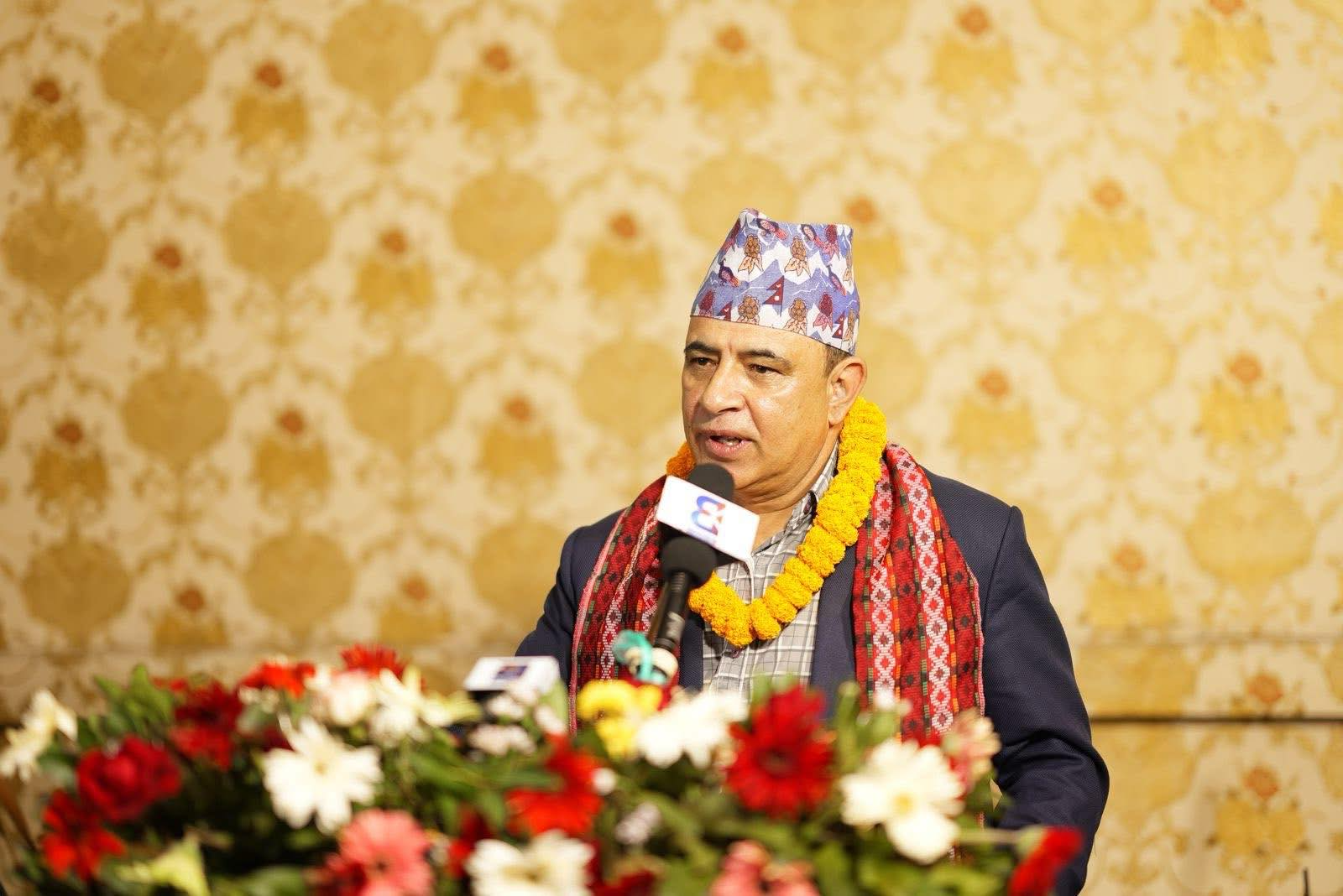
- Dahal at 70th Anniversary of Nepal China Diplomatic Relations

Ambassador of Nepal to Australia
- In office 13 November 2019 – 4 May 2021
- President: Bidya Devi Bhandari
- Preceded by: Lucky Sherpa
- Succeeded by: Kailash Raj Pokharel

Non-Resident Ambassador of Nepal to New Zealand, Fiji, and Papua New Guinea
- In office 2020–2021

Executive Chairman of Nepal Television
- In office 25 November 2015 – 2018

Personal details
- Born: 20 March 1972 (age 54) Parbatipur-02, Bharatpur Metropolitan City-21, Chitwan District, Nepal
- Spouse: Prabha Dahal
- Children: 1
- Education: LLB – Tribhuvan University (1997); BEd – Nepal Sanskrit University (2008); MA (Political Science) – Tribhuvan University (2001); MA (Sociology) – Tribhuvan University (2013); MPhil (Sociology) – Tribhuvan University (ongoing); PhD (Sociology, pursuing) – Tribhuvan University
- Occupation: Diplomat, media executive, educator, consultant
- Website: maheshdahal.com

Mahesh Raj Dahal (महेशराज दाहाल; born 20 March 1972) is a Nepalese diplomat, media executive, educator, and leadership consultant. He served as the Ambassador of Nepal to Australia from 2019 to 2021, concurrently accredited as Non-Resident Ambassador to New Zealand, Fiji, and Papua New Guinea.

Prior to his diplomatic role, Dahal was Executive Chairman of Nepal Television from 2015 to 2018. He is the founding executive director of Stairway Management since 2006 and served as National President of JCI Nepal in 2011. He has over 25 years of experience in governance, international development, and social mobilisation, and has provided consulting services to organisations including the World Bank, UNDP, UNICEF, USAID, Helvetas, and the Government of Nepal.

== Early life and education ==
Mahesh Raj Dahal was born on 20 March 1972 in Parbatipur-02, Bharatpur Metropolitan City-21, Chitwan District, Nepal. He is married to Prabha Dahal and has one son.

Dahal holds degrees from Tribhuvan University and affiliated institutions:

- Bachelor of Laws (LLB) – Nepal Law Campus, Tribhuvan University (1997)
- Bachelor of Education (BEd) in Social Studies – Balmiki Campus, Nepal Sanskrit University (2008)
- Master of Arts (MA) in Political Science – Tribhuvan University (2001)
- MA in Sociology – Patan Multiple Campus, Tribhuvan University (2013)
- MPhil in Sociology – Tribhuvan University (enrolled 2011, ongoing)
- PhD in sociology (pursuing) – Tribhuvan University

He also completed a Diploma in Computer Science at Sea Gate Computer Institute (on scholarship from MS Nepal and the Danish Embassy) and an Integrated Diploma in Computer Application at Himalayan Educational Institute.

== Career ==
=== Diplomatic service ===
Dahal was appointed Ambassador of Nepal to Australia on 16 October 2019 by President Bidya Devi Bhandari on the recommendation of the Council of Ministers, succeeding Lucky Sherpa. He was sworn in at Sheetal Niwas in the presence of Foreign Minister Pradeep Gyawali. He presented his credentials to Governor-General David Hurley on 13 November 2019.

During his tenure, he was accredited as Non-Resident Ambassador to New Zealand (credentials presented via video in 2020), Fiji (13 March 2020), and Papua New Guinea. His work focused on bilateral trade, investment, cultural ties, and support for the Nepalese diaspora during the COVID-19 pandemic. In April 2020, he advised Nepalese citizens in Australia against non-essential travel to Nepal. He visited Western Australia from 10 to 13 March 2020, meeting Governor Kim Beazley and state officials.

Dahal was recalled on 4 May 2021 following political changes in Nepal, reportedly due to his association with CPN (Maoist Centre) leader Pushpa Kamal Dahal. He was succeeded by Kailash Raj Pokharel in 2022.

=== Media leadership ===
Dahal served as Executive Chairman of Nepal Television from 25 November 2015 to 2018, overseeing digital transition, infrastructure upgrades, and content diversification.

=== Academia ===
Since 2013, Dahal has lectured in Business Law at Pinnacle Academy, Lalitpur, and in Social Work and Sociology at Platinum International College, Kalikasthan.

=== Consulting and leadership development ===
As founding executive director of Stairway Management since 2006, Dahal has conducted over 1,000 training programmes for organisations including the World Bank, UNDP, UNICEF, USAID, Helvetas, DFID, SNV, CARE, and ActionAid, as well as Nepalese government bodies, political parties, unions, banks, and cooperatives. Topics include leadership, training of trainers, participatory rural appraisal, disaster management, gender, youth mobilisation, monitoring and evaluation, and public speaking.

He was National Project Coordinator for the 2015 Earthquake Relief Project with Islamic Relief Worldwide from April to November 2015.

=== Research and early career ===
Dahal started his career as a computer instructor at Ultra Systems Computer International from 1995 to 1996. He led research teams for projects including the World Bank Poverty Assessment (1999–2000), HelpAge International Elderly Conditions Study via NEPAN (1998–1999), ActionAid Food Security Programme in Nawalparasi, and Helvetas Sustainable Soil Management Project (2002–2003).

He served as a board member of the High-Level Commission for Information Technology (2006–2009) and the Institute of Foreign Affairs (2010–2012).

=== Civic and international leadership ===
Dahal was National President of JCI Nepal in 2011 and is a JCI International Senator. He attended JCI events including the Academy Seminar in Kobe, Japan (2005); European Conference in Aarhus, Denmark (2010); Asia Pacific Conference in Manila, Philippines (2012); UN Partnership Summits in New York (2011, 2012); and World Congress in Brussels, Belgium (2011).

He was Chief Trainer for RYLA in 2013, District Chairperson for Lions Club International District 325A in 2006, and Founder President of Nepal Optimist Club.

== Publications and presentations ==
Dahal has authored over 100 reports and seminar proceedings, including:

- The Degrading Environment of Chitwan District (2000)
- Empowering Migrant Women Workers in Nepal (UNIFEM-supported)
- Food Security Situation – Nawalparasi (ActionAid Nepal)
- Youth in Transitional Nepal: Issues and Perceptions (Alliance for Peace, 2009)

He presented papers on participatory networks in Islamabad, Pakistan (2000, with SDC) and participatory approaches in Cairo, Egypt.
