= Dicky Dolma =

Indian mountaineer

Personal information
- Born: 5 April 1974 (age 52) Palchan, Kullu, Himachal Pradesh, India

Skiing career
- Sport: Alpine skiing
- Disciplines: Slalom, giant slalom, Super-G

Dicky Dolma (born 5 April 1974) is an Indian mountaineer and former alpine skier. She is known for being the youngest woman to summit Mount Everest up to that time at the age of 19 on 10 May 1993, which occurred on the Indo-Nepal Everest Expedition.

== Career ==
The Indo-Nepal Women's Everest Expedition was led by Bachendri Pal who was the first Indian woman to summit Mount Everest in 1984. Dicky was also a skier and attended numerous sporting competitions including the 1989 All-India Open Auli Ski Festival and the Asian Winter Games in 1999. She took ski training courses and basic mountaineering courses by the Manali Institute. In the same expedition as Dicky Dolma, Santosh Yadav summited Mount Everest for the second time, the first woman to summit twice. Dolma came from Palchan Village near Manali of Himachal Pradesh state in India. She was also awarded the 1994 National Adventure Award.

Previous record holders up to Dolma for youngest Woman to summit Everest (age at summiting):

- Junko Tabei, born 22 September 1939, summited 16 May 1975, age 35 years, 236 days
- Bachendri Pal, born 25 April 1954, summited 23 May 1984, age 30 years, 28 days
- Sharon Wood, born 18 May 1957, summited 20 May 1986, age 29 years, 2 days
- Lydia Bradey, born 9 October 1961, summited 14 Oct 1988, age 27 years, 5 days
- Santosh Yadav, born 10 October 1967, summited 12 May 1992, age 24 years, 215 days
- Kim Soon-Jo, born 10 August 1970, summited 10 May 1993, age 22 years, 273 days
- Dicky Dolma, born 5 April 1974, summited 10 May 1993, age 19 years, 35 days

== See also ==
- Chhurim
- Indian summiters of Mount Everest - Year wise
- Lhakpa Sherpa
- List of Mount Everest records
- List of Mount Everest records of India
- List of Mount Everest summiters by number of times to the summit
- List of 20th-century summiters of Mount Everest
- Malavath Purna
- Ming Kipa
