= Seven Summits Women Team =

Nepali women's mountaineering group

The Seven Summits Women Team is a group of Nepali women who are the first documented all women's expedition to summit Mount Everest. They are also the first group of Nepali women to climb the highest points on all seven continents (Seven Summits), completing their goal in 2014.

The group began in 2007 as the First Inclusive Women Sagarmata Expedition (FIWSE), initiated by Da Gombu Sherpa and Pemba Dorji Sherpa. Prior to 2007, only seven Nepali women in total were documented as having successfully scaled the summit of Mount Everest. The FIWSE team includes Pujan Acharya, Shailee Basnet, Maya Gurung, Asha Kumari Singh, Pima Diki Sherpa, Nimadoma Sherpa and Chunu Shrestha. The project received funding through the World Food Programme, as well as other Nepali and international government organizations. One of the goals of the team was to encourage more participation by Nepali women in the sport and industry of mountaineering in the area.

The team of ten women, accompanied by Sherpa guides, set out to climb Mount Everest in May 2008. By May 25, 2008, all ten members of the team had reached the summit.

Following their achievements, team members became public advocates, motivational speakers, stand up comedians, and community organizers. The team raises funds and run development projects in their local communities, particularly following the earthquake in Nepal in April 2015. Other team members have become social activists, advocating for gender equality, changes in local school curriculum, and confronting the social stigma of widows in Nepalese culture.
