= Will Cross =

American mountain climber

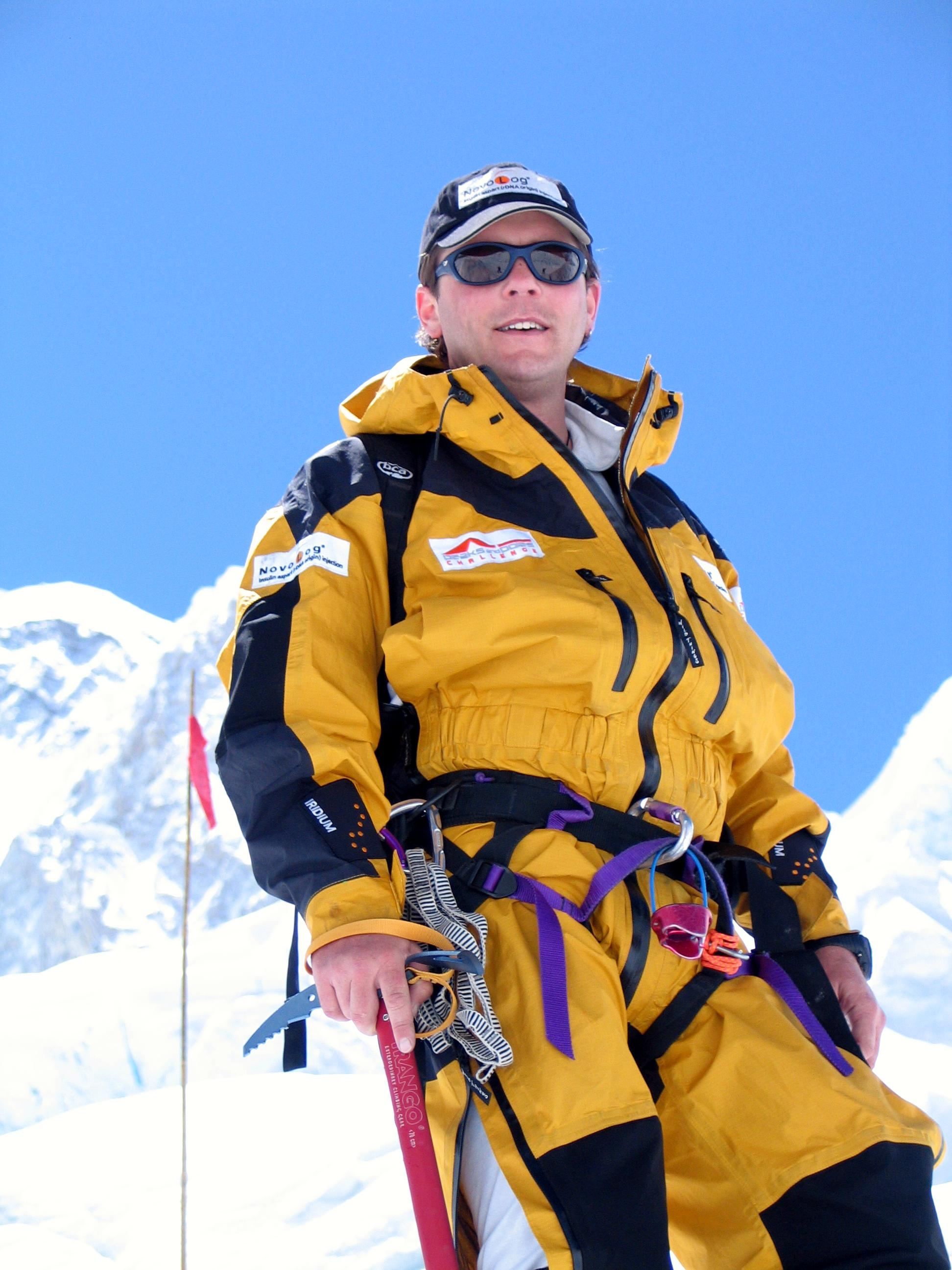
Will Cross on Mt. Everest

William H. Cross is an American mountaineer.

He has climbed the Seven Summits and walked to both the North and South Poles. He has also led expeditions to 15 unmapped, unexplored mountains in Greenland and also in Patagonia, Mountains of the Moon, the Sahara Desert, and the Thar Desert of India.

Cross has lived with type 1 diabetes for over 30 years.

He earned a Bachelor of Arts from Allegheny College, a Master of Science in Education from Duquesne University, and Secondary Principal's Certification from the University of Pittsburgh, where he specialized in educational programs for troubled teens. Will, his wife Amy, and their 6 children live in Pittsburgh, Pennsylvania.

He is a member of the American Alpine Club, Royal Geographical Society, Explorers Club, and the American Mountain Guides Association. He received a Gold Congressional Award for exemplary service to the United States, granted for his initiative, achievement, and service.

== Summits ==
Eight-thousanders summited:

- 2011 Manaslu
- 2009 Cho Oyu
- Summited Mount Everest: May 23, 2006

He made headlines for attempting to summit Everest in 2005 despite having to deal with Type one diabetes, and he had also tried to summit in 2004. However, on these first two expeditions he did not reach the summit even though he did learn about mountaineering and Mount Everest.

Other peaks he has summited:

- Aconcagua
- Vinson Massif
- Kilimanjaro
- Denali
- Kosciuszko
- Mont Blanc
- Puncak Jaya
- Mount Elbrus
- Mount Rainier
- Pico de Orizaba
- Volcán Tajumulco

== See also ==
- List of Mount Everest summiters by number of times to the summit
- List of Mount Everest records
- Geri Winkler

== Sources ==
- David Templeton (2008). Pittsburgh Post-Gazette: Adventurer with diabetes prepares for another mountain climb. Retrieved March 31, 2008.
