= Pemba Doma Sherpa =

Nepalese mountain climber

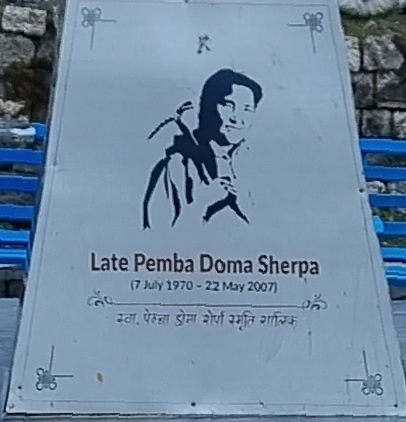
- Born: July 7, 1970
- Died: May 22, 2007
- Occupation: Mountaineer
- Known for: First Nepalese female mountaineer to climb Mount Everest via its north face.

Pemba Doma Sherpa (Nepali: पेम्बा डोमा शेर्पा) (7 July 1970 – 22 May 2007) was the first Nepalese female mountaineer to climb Mount Everest via its north face, was the second Nepali woman to summit from both the north and south faces, and is one of six women to have summited Everest twice. She was the leader of the 2002 Nepalese Woman Everest Expedition. Pemba Doma Sherpa climbed Cho Oyu from the Tibetan side on 28 September 2005.

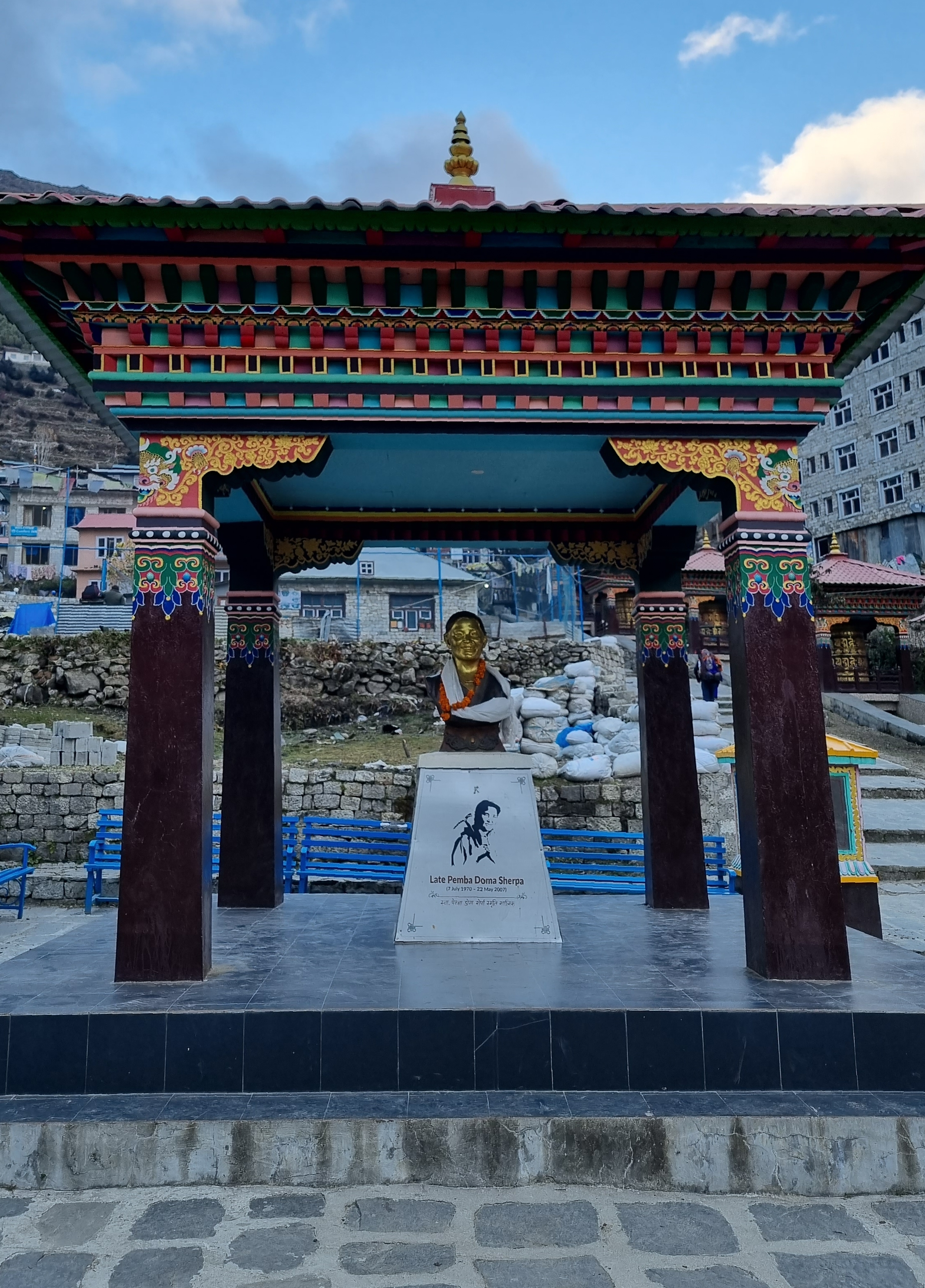
Bust of Pemba Doma Sherpa at her memorial in Namche Bazaar

A resident of Namche-1 of Solukhumbu district, Pemba Doma had been raised by her grandparents after her parents died when she was two. She attended classes in one of the schools built by Edmund Hillary. She was the founder of the Save the Himalayan Kingdom charity, which focused on educating Nepali children regardless of caste. She was also the director of the Climb High Himalaya trekking company.

Pemba Doma fell from an elevation of 8,000 metres (26,000 ft) while descending Lhotse. The fall was witnessed by Australian mountaineer Philip Ling who was also climbing the mountain. Two other Sherpas also perished while descending a group of clients during a snowstorm.

== Everest summits ==
- 2000
- 2002

== See also ==
- List of Mount Everest summiters by number of times to the summit
- List of Mount Everest records
- Lhakpa Sherpa
- Ming Kipa
