= George Atkinson (climber) =

English mountain climber

- Born: 29 May 1994 (age 32); Surrey, England
- Education: Ewell Castle School
- Known for: Youngest Briton to climb the Seven Summits

George Atkinson (born 29 May 1994) is an English climber. At the age of sixteen he became the youngest ever person to complete the Seven Summits Challenge by climbing to the summit of the highest mountain on each of seven continents. He completed the challenge on 26 May 2011 when he reached the summit of Mount Everest.

Atkinson was 16 years and 362 days old when he completed the challenge which beat previous record holder Johnny Collinson who completed the challenge at 17 years and 296 days old. His record stood for seven months, until it was bested by Jordan Romero, who completed the challenge on 24 December 2011 at the age of 15.

== Seven Summits ==
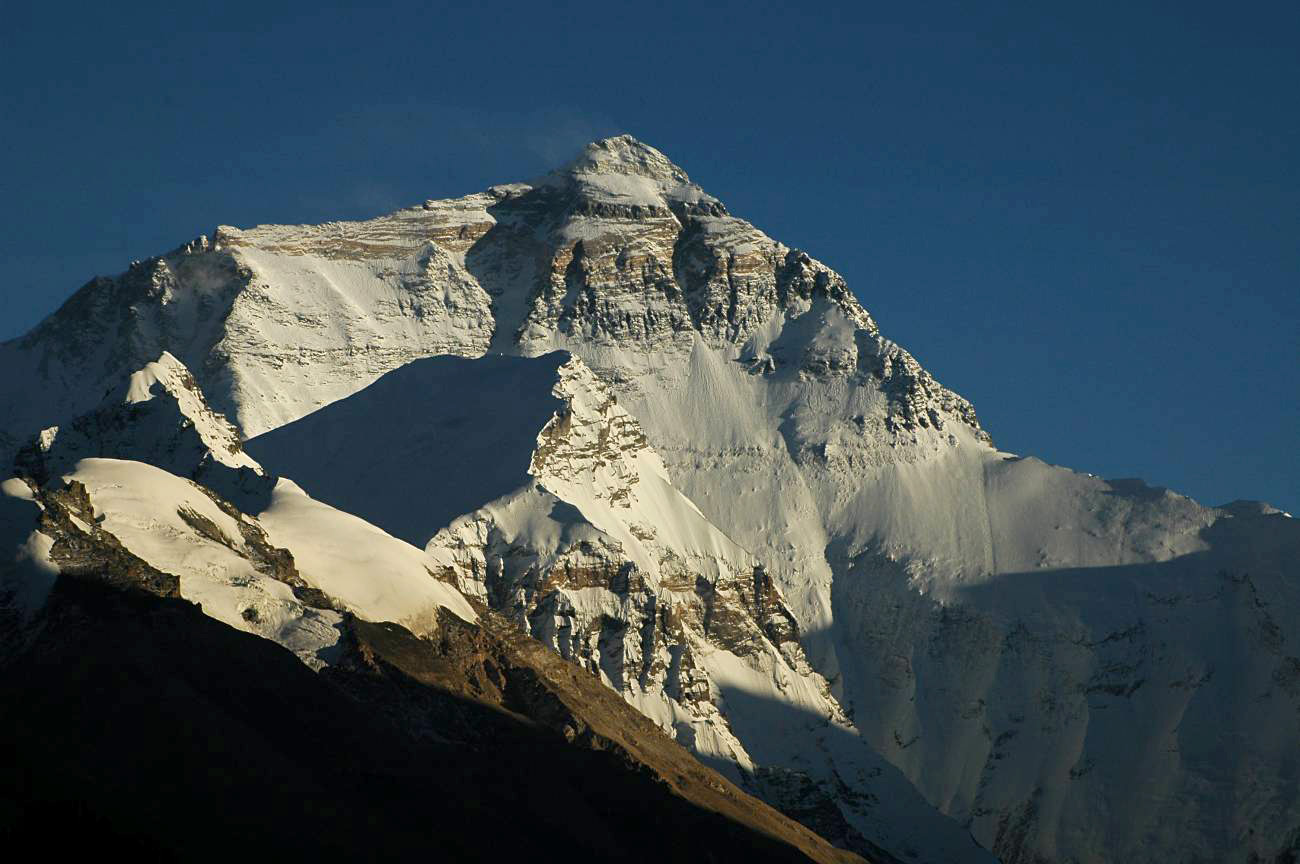
Mount Everest, the final mountain climbed during Atkinson's Seven Summits attempt

Atkinson embarked on a world record attempt to be the youngest person to climb the tallest mountain on each of the seven continents when he was 11 years old. He completed it nearly six years later just a few days before his 17th birthday. He climbed Kilimanjaro, the tallest mountain in Africa, first. This was followed by Europe's Mount Elbrus at age 13. Shortly before his 14th birthday Atkinson reached the summit of Australasia's Puncak Jaya and returned safely from the summit despite the arrest of his guides and ultimately his own arrest. Peak four was Aconcagua in South America.

At age 16 Atkinson climbed Denali in North America, reaching the summit on 12 July 2010, followed by Mount Vinson the highest mountain in Antarctica. The final peak was the world's highest mountain Mount Everest in Asia. Atkinson reached the summit on 26 May 2011, becoming the youngest person to complete the Seven Summits. He held the record until December 2011, when Jordan Romero completed the Seven Summits aged 15 years, 5 months, and 12 days.

== World records ==
Atkinson has held world records for:

- Youngest British person to climb the Seven Summits
- Youngest British person to reach the summit of Mount Everest (the youngest person is Jordan Romero)
