= Chyangba =

Village in the Eastern Region of Nepal

Chyangba is a small village in Tapting municipality, Eastern Region of Nepal.
