= Geri Winkler =

Austrian mountaineer

Geri Winkler, 2003

Geri Winkler (born 13 April 1956 in Vienna, Austria) is an Austrian mountaineer, who was the first insulin-dependent diabetic to reach the summit of Mount Everest.

He is the first person to have visited every country in the world and climbed the Seven Summits—the highest peaks on each continent—according to both the Messner and Bass lists.

Winkler worked as a mathematics teacher in Vienna. He is married to Sylvia Alfery, who has accompanied him on most of his travels. He has one son, Markus, born in 1987.

== Mountaineering ==
In the first few years after his diabetes diagnosis, Winkler climbed several peaks above 6,000 meters in the Andes and the Pamir Mountains. In the summer of 1994, as part of a German expedition, he successfully climbed Muztagh Ata (7,546 meters / 24,757 feet) in western China. This marked the first time a person with diabetes had ascended into what is known as the Death Zone, the altitude above 7,500 meters.

He subsequently climbed Lenin Peak (7,134 meters / 23,406 feet), on the border between Kyrgyzstan and Tajikistan, making a solo ascent from Camp II, as well as several of the highest peaks in the Andes.

During the 2004–2005 Antarctic summer, Winkler took part in an international expedition to the Ellsworth Mountains. The expedition also saw him successfully climb Mount Vinson, the highest mountain on the Antarctic continent.

Winkler's summit success on Mount Everest attracted particular attention. He began his ascent on October 15, 2005, on the shore of the Dead Sea in Jordan, the lowest accessible point on Earth. He cycled nearly 8,100 kilometers (5,033 miles) from Jordan through Syria, Turkey, Iran, Pakistan, and India to the village of Jiri in Nepal. From there, he continued on foot toward the Everest region. He joined an American expedition and reached the summit on May 20, 2006. In doing so, he completed the greatest possible ascent on Earth: a vertical gain of 9,270 meters (30,413 feet), starting at the Dead Sea, 421 meters (1,381 feet) below sea level. It was the first attempt to climb Mount Everest starting from the lowest accessible point on Earth. In terms of cumulative elevation gain, the journey was the longest mountain expedition of its kind to date, involving approximately 78,000 meters (nearly 256,000 feet) of ascent.

In July 2008, by climbing Denali (6,194 meters / 20,320 feet), formerly known as Mount McKinley, in Alaska, Geri Winkler became the first person with diabetes to complete the Seven Summits. Having already climbed both Carstensz Pyramid and Mount Kosciuszko in November 2007, he completed both versions of the Seven Summits challenge: the Messner list and the Bass list.

On September 30, 2009 Geri Winkler is recorded to have summited Cho Oyu

In May 2015, Winkler reached the summit of Gunnbjørn Fjeld, the highest mountain in Greenland and the Arctic, together with Stefan Peer, Elke Bolduan, and Achim Bamberger. It was the first ascent of the mountain via its west face.

Geri Winkler has climbed countless peaks in the Alps and more than 50 mountains exceeding 5,000 meters (appr. 16,400 feet) in elevation. He has also climbed the highest peak in 112 of the 193 United Nations member states.

== Travel ==
Geri Winkler began his life of travel at the age of 17, hitchhiking and using Interrail, the European rail pass. Since 1983, he has traveled extensively across all continents, always on a shoestring budget, backpacking and living in basic conditions. Bicycle touring and long-distance hiking and trekking have been central to his travels.

In 1988, he crossed the Indian Himalayas along a route that had not been used for decades. A year later, on the Congolese side of the Rwenzori Mountains, he rediscovered Lake Speke, which had long been lost to outside knowledge.

In 1992, he and three travel companions undertook extensive treks in the mountainous terrain of Indonesia's Papua Province, then known as Irian Jaya. During this expedition, they became the first outsiders to venture into the upper Kemabu Valley, home to the Moni people.

In 2007, Winkler and Sylvia Alfery traveled through large parts of the Korowai people's territory in the lowlands of New Guinea. One of the objectives was to reach the settlements of the Korowai Batu, who were still living in relative isolation beyond the Pacification Line, an imaginary boundary defined by missionary Gerrit van Enk. Shortly before reaching this line in the rainforest, Geri Winkler was forced to abandon the attempt because of a fractured fibula. Sylvia Alfery, however, continued with local guides from the pacified Korowai area and managed to reach the territory of the Korowai Batu beyond the Pacification Line. She was welcomed into the previously undocumented clan settlements of Wayal and Nanagaton.

In the spring of 2008, Sylvia Alfery and Geri Winkler crossed the Sahara by bicycle, traveling from Agadir to Senegal. On October 5, 2017, with his entry into Angola, Geri Winkler completed his visits to all 193 United Nations member states.

In addition,he has traveled to Antarctica, Greenland, the Faroe Islands, Taiwan, Kosovo, Vatican City, Western Sahara, Palestine, Transnistria, Abkhazia, and Nagorno-Karabakh.

== Publications ==
- Gerhard Winkler (Ed.) Aufbruch in die Grenzenlosigkeit. Die Freiheit eines Diabetikerlebens. (German lang.). 2000. ISBN 3-9501240-0-4.
- Geri Winkler Sieben Welten - Seven Summits. Mein Weg zu den höchsten Gipfeln aller Kontinente. (German lang.). Tyrolia-Verlag, Innsbruck and Wien 2011. ISBN 978-3-7022-3120-0.
- Geri Winkler Mein Neuntausender. Vom tiefsten Punkt der Erde auf den Gipfel des Mount Everest. (German lang.). Egoth-Verlag, Wien 2019. ISBN 978-3-903183-13-1.

== See also ==
- List of Mount Everest records
- Will Cross
