= Moni Mulepati =

Nepalese Newar mountain climber (born 1981)

Moni Mulepati (Nepali: मोनि मुलेपति; born 1981 in Nepal) is a Nepalese Newar mountain climber. She is the first non-Sherpa Nepalese woman to reach the summit of Mount Everest, having reached the peak on 30 May 2005. She is also the first woman to be married at the summit by marrying her climbing partner Pem Dorjee.
