= Pem Dorjee Sherpa =

Nepalese mountain climber (born 1982)

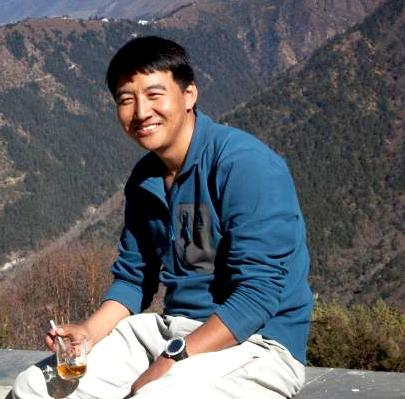
- Pem Dorjee in 2012

Personal information
- Nationality: Nepalese/American
- Born: 1982 (age 43–44) Tapting, Solukhumbu District, Nepal
- Spouse: Moni Mulepati
- Children: Pelzom Sherpa & Mezel Sherpa

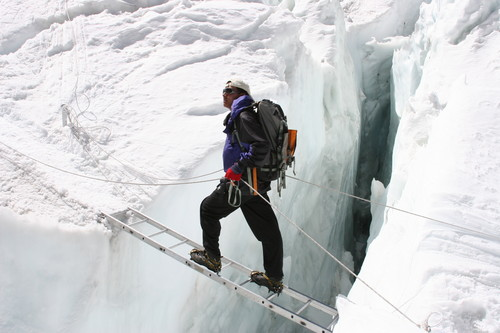
Pem Dorjee crossing the Khumbu Icefall

Pem Dorjee Sherpa (Nepali: पेम्दोर्जी शेर्पा; born 1982) is a Nepalese Sherpa mountaineer. He was born in Chyangba, a small, remote village which is part of Tapting, Nepal.

Dorjee has climbed Mount Everest two times, the second time with his girlfriend Moni Mulepati where they exchanged wedding vows on May 30th of 2005, and thus became the first couple to be married on top of Mount Everest while on the Rotary Centennial Everest Expedition. They also hoisted the flag of Rotary International, a club with which Dorjee has frequently been involved, in honor of its centennial year.

Aside from his mountaineering achievements, Dorjee has worked on improving the quality of life in his home village of Chyangba. Dorjee has organized service projects such as dental, eye, and other health projects, as well as funding to build libraries, schools, and drinking water systems in his village and other remote villages in Nepal.

Dorjee is certified as a Trekking and Mountaineering Guide by the Nepalese government. He is also an active member of the American Mountain Guides Association (AMGA), American Alpine Club, Nepal Mountaineering Association, and Everest Summiteers Association. Dorjee recently hiked 3,100 miles along the Continental Divide Trail from the Mexico–US border to the Canada–US border as part of the Rotary CDT Challenge, a fundraising effort by Rotary International to build a continuous trail. Dorjee and his wife own the gift shop The Himalayan Bazaar and the tour and trekking company Imperial Expedition.

== Records ==
Dorjee and Moni Mulepati were the first couple to marry on top of Mt. Everest on 30 May 2005.

== See also ==
- List of Mount Everest records
- List of Mount Everest guides
