= Xia Boyu =

Chinese double amputee mountaineer

Xia Boyu (born 2 July 1949) is a double amputee mountaineer who gained international fame after becoming the second double amputee to have climbed Mount Everest. He reached the peak on 14 May 2018, at an age of 69 years. It was Boyu's fifth attempt (1975, 2014, 2015, 2016), and he was guided by Dawa Gyalje Sherpa. Boyu had his feet amputated during his first attempt in 1975, after giving his own sleeping bag to a climbing mate during a storm. In 1996, his lower legs were amputated due to lymphoma. He was subsequently awarded with the 2019 Laureus Sporting Moment of the Year.
