= Ming Kipa =

Nepalese Sherpa girl (born 1988)

Ming Kipa (Nepali: मिङ किपा शेर्पा) (born 1988) is a Nepalese Sherpa woman who held the record as the youngest person to climb Mount Everest from 2003 to 2010. She reached the summit on May 22, 2003, when she was 15 years old, with her brother Mingma Gyula and her sister Lhakpa. Nepalese law does not allow climbers under 16 to climb Everest, so Ming Kipa Sherpa summited Everest from the Chinese side. Her record was broken in 2010 when Jordan Romero reached the summit on May 22 of that year at the age of 13 years, 10 months. The previous record holder was Temba Tsheri who climbed Everest at the age of 16 in 2001.

At the time of this record, 2003, about 1200 people had reached the summit of Mount Everest since 1953 with about 175 dying.

== See also ==
- List of Mount Everest records
- Dicky Dolma
- Melissa Arnot
- Shriya Shah-Klorfine
