= Chhurim =

Nepalese mountain climber

Chhurim Sherpa
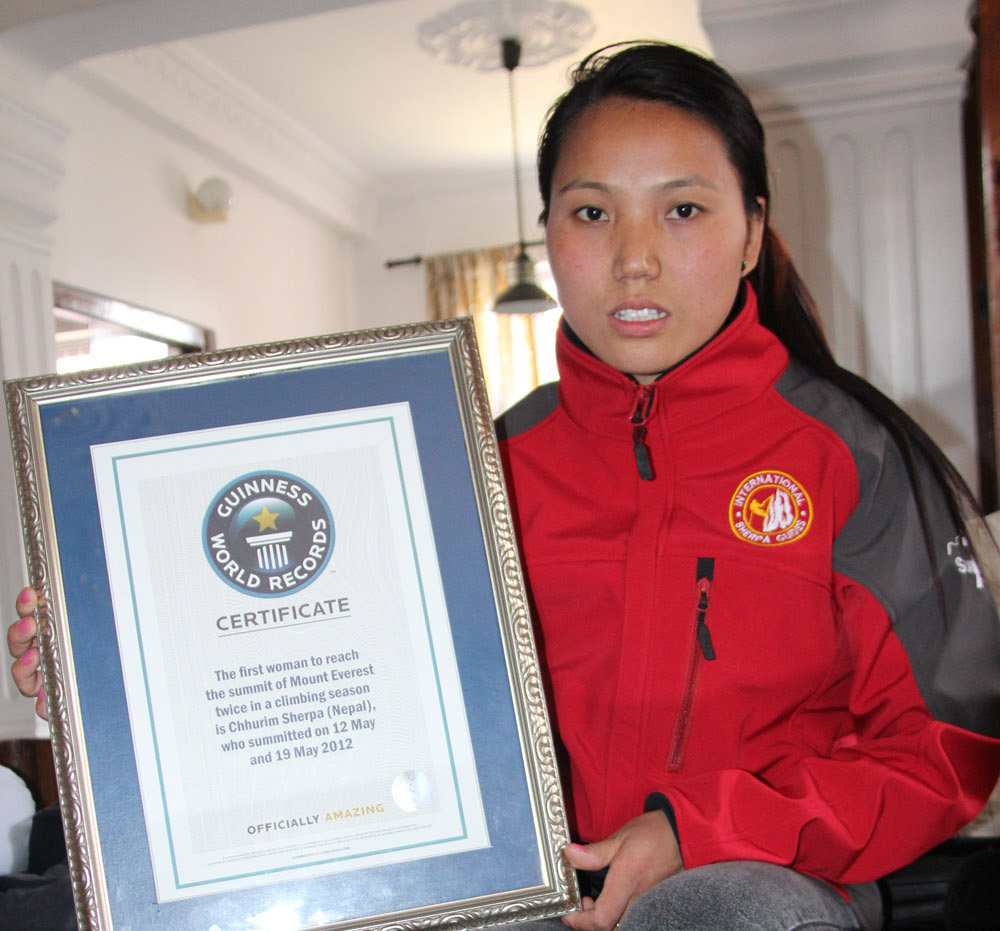
- Born: 1984 (age 41–42); Lelep-9, Taplejung, Nepal
- Other name: Chhurim
- Occupation: Mountaineer
- Known for: First woman to climb Mount Everest twice in the same season
- Father: Dandu Sherpa

Chhurim is a Nepali mountaineer and the first woman to climb Mount Everest twice in the same season, a feat which was verified by the Guinness Book of World Records in 2013. She accomplished this feat in 2012, climbing Everest on May 12 and again on May 19.

"People have set different kinds of climbing records in Everest," said Chhurim, sitting on her living room couch directly beneath a string of certificates hung on the wall—the Guinness plaque included. "But no one has climbed twice within a week. So I just climbed with the sole motive of making a world record."

"But for Chhurim, it was Pasang Lhamu Sherpa—the first Nepalese woman to climb Everest (she died during her descent)—who inspired the then fifth grader to sketch a future plan that most girls the same age couldn't conceive of."

"To date, the total number of people who have successfully climbed Everest from the Nepalese side, according to the Expedition Department at the Ministry of Tourism, stands at 3,842. Of them only 219 are women, out of whom a mere 21 are Nepalese."

"I really want other Nepalese women to get involved in mountaineering," Chhurim said. "We should have a can-do attitude so that we can move forward and not be left behind simply because we're women."

"As she held her framed world record certificate to pose for a photograph, Chhurim said, 'I have created a name for myself and I have raised my country's profile. If you're really determined, you can definitely take yourself to new heights, and that's what I've done.'"

Chhurim is a Sherpa from Taplejung in east Nepal and, like most Sherpa, she uses one name, rather than a first and last name.

== See also ==
- List of Mount Everest records
- List of Mount Everest summiters by number of times to the summit
- Lhakpa Sherpa
