= Phunjo Jhangmu Lama =

Nepalese mountaineer

Phunjo Jhangmu Lama is a pioneering Nepalese trekking guide and mountaineer, renowned for being the first female long-line rescuer from Nepal. She first set the women's speed record for ascending Mount Everest in 2018 with a time of 39 hours and 6 minutes from Base Camp for the round trip. This record was broken in 2021 by Ada Tsang who completed it in 25 hours and 50 minutes. In May 2023, Lama reclaimed the record with a new fastest time, completing the ascent from Base Camp in 14 hours and 31 minutes and the entire round trip in 24 hours and 26 minutes

== Early life ==
Lama was born in Chokangparo village in Tsum Valley of Nepal’s Gorkha District, a remote Himalayan region that includes Manaslu, the world’s eighth-highest mountain. After losing her mother at the young age of 2, she spent her early years herding yaks with her grandfather, Me Norbu, at altitudes between 4,500 and 5,000 meters. "I was born in the mountains and grew up in the mountains... but our community is not very involved in mountaineering," she noted. She later relocated to Kathmandu, where she studied English and Nepali, having grown up speaking the Sino-Tibetan language Tsum ke.

== Mountaineering career ==
Lama began her connection to mountaineering in 2014 when she started training for long line rescues and met other climbers. She began climbing professionally in 2016, going on to scale various peaks. Her guide Tendi Sherpa of Tag Nepal, described her as "a very strong climber" who "loves the mountains." Her notable ascents include climbing Cho Oyu without supplemental oxygen, as well as successful summits of Denali, Island Peak, Manaslu, Ama Dablam, Mount Kosciuszko and Lobuche. She holds the distinction of being the first woman from Nepal’s Tsum Valley and Manaslu region to successfully summit Mount Everest.

== Achievements ==
Lama serves as a Tourism Goodwill Ambassador for Nepal She is also noted as Nepal's first female long-line helicopter rescuer, having received training in both the Swiss Alps and Nepalese Himalayas.
