= Kami Sherpa =

Nepalese mountaineer

Kami Sherpa, (Nepali: कामी शेर्पा) is a Nepalese mountaineer who has successfully climbed Everest three times in eight days. Sherpa climbed Everest twice in five days and the third time on the eighth day. Sherpa had climbed Everest at 10:30 am on May 19, 3:00 pm on May 24 and 4:00 am on May 27.

Sherpa has also claimed that his three climbs in a single season is a world record. He had climbed Everest for the first time in 1997. With three successful climbs this season, he has now scaled Everest 14 times. Sherpa is also the first Vice-Chairman of Everest Climbers' Association. Sherpa was born in Solukhumbu district and resides in Kapan, Kathmandu.

== See also ==
- List of Mount Everest summiters by number of times to the summit
