= Pema Diki Sherpa =

Nepalese mountaineer

- Born: Pema Diki Sherpa; 1988; Gaurishankar-3, Dolakha, Nepal
- Known for: Youngest woman to reach summit of Mount Everest

Pema Diki Sherpa (Nepali: पेमादिकी शेर्पा) is from Simigau, Gauri Sankar, Dolakha District, Nepalese mountain climber. In 2008 she became the youngest woman to climb Mount Everest and in 2009 she joined the Seven Summits Women Team, a team of Nepalese women whose goal is to climb the Seven Summits.

In 2009, Pema Diki and six of her Nepalese Sagarmatha Expedition teammates formed the Seven Summits Women Team, an all-female team whose goal is to climb the Seven Summits, the highest mountains of each continent. In addition to Pema Diki, the team members comprised Shailee Basnet, Pujan Acharya, Maya Gurung, Asha Kumari Singh, Nimadoma Sherpa and Chunu Shrestha. Having already climbed Mount Everest, the team began their mission in 2010 with successful ascents of Mount Kosciuszko (Australia) and Mount Elbrus (Russia). In March 2013, they joined three Tanzanian women to climb Mount Kilimanjaro (Tanzania) in celebration of International Women's Day. In February 2014, Nimdoma and three other teammates reached the summit of Aconcagua (Argentina), their fifth mountain of the Seven Summits. The team plans to climb Mount McKinley (United States) and Vinson Massif (Antarctica) to complete the challenge by the end of 2015.
