= Tamae Watanabe =

Japanese mountain climber

Tamae Watanabe (Japanese 渡辺 玉枝, Watanabe Tamae; born 21 November 1938, in Yamanashi Prefecture) is a Japanese mountain climber.

After completing study at Tsuru University she worked as public office employee of Kanagawa Prefecture. It was at this time, at age 28, she began mountain climbing. In 1977, she climbed Mount McKinley. She then climbed Mont Blanc, Mount Kilimanjaro, and Aconcagua.

After her retirement, she returned to her hometown and, in May 2002, she became the then oldest woman to climb Mount Everest. Ten years later, in May 2012, she broke her own record, when she, now at the age of 73, again scaled Mount Everest.

The oldest man to summit Everest is also Japanese, Yūichirō Miura. Like Watanabe, he also broke his own record—twice; climbing Everest at ages 70, 75, and 80.

== See also ==
- List of Mount Everest summiters by number of times to the summit
