= Sonam Gyalchhen Sherpa =

Nepalese politician

Memberof CPN UML
- Incumbent
- Assumed office 23 September 2021
- Preceded by: Position created

Member of Rastriya Sabha
- Incumbent
- Assumed office 2022
- Prime Minister: Sher Bahadur Deuba
- Constituency: Province No. 1

Personal details
- Party: CPN UML

Sonam Gyalchhen Sherpa (Nepali: सोनाम गेल्जेन शेर्पा) is a Nepalese politician. He is also member of Rastriya Sabha and was elected from 2022 Nepalese National Assembly election.
