= Jordan Romero =

American mountain climber (born 1996)

- Born: July 12, 1996 (age 30); Redlands, California, U.S.
- Occupation: Mountain climber
- Years active: 2006–present
- Known for: Youngest person to climb Mount Everest

Jordan Romero (born July 12, 1996) is an American mountaineer who was 13 years old when he reached the summit of Mount Everest. Romero was accompanied by his father, Paul Romero, his step-mother, Karen Lundgren, and three Sherpas, Ang Pasang Sherpa, Lama Dawa Sherpa, and Lama Karma Sherpa. The previous record for youngest to climb Everest was held by Ming Kipa of Nepal who was 15 years old when she reached the summit on May 22, 2003.

Romero was inspired to climb the tallest mountains of each continent when he saw a painting in the hallway of his school that had the seven continents' highest mountains. Upon climbing Vinson Massif in December 2011 at the age of 15 years, 5 months, 12 days, Romero became the youngest person in the world to complete the Seven Summits (highest mountains on each of the continents), a title previously held by George Atkinson. After this experience, Romero wrote a novel for children called No Summit Out of Sight.

== Mountains climbed ==
Noted summits Romero has climbed
Year	Summits	Country	Continent	Elevation ft	Elevation m
July 2006	Mount Kilimanjaro	Tanzania	Africa	19,820	5,892
April 2007	Mount Kosciuszko	Australia	Australia	7,310	2,228
July 2007	Mount Elbrus	Russia	Europe	18,510	5,642
December 2007	Aconcagua	Argentina	South America	22,841	6,962
June 2008	Denali	United States (Alaska)	North America	20,320	6,194
September 2009	Mount Carstensz Pyramid	Indonesia (New Guinea)	Oceania	16,024	4,884
May 2010	Mount Everest	Nepal - China	Asia	29,029	8,848
December 2011	Vinson Massif	N/A	Antarctica	16,050	4,892

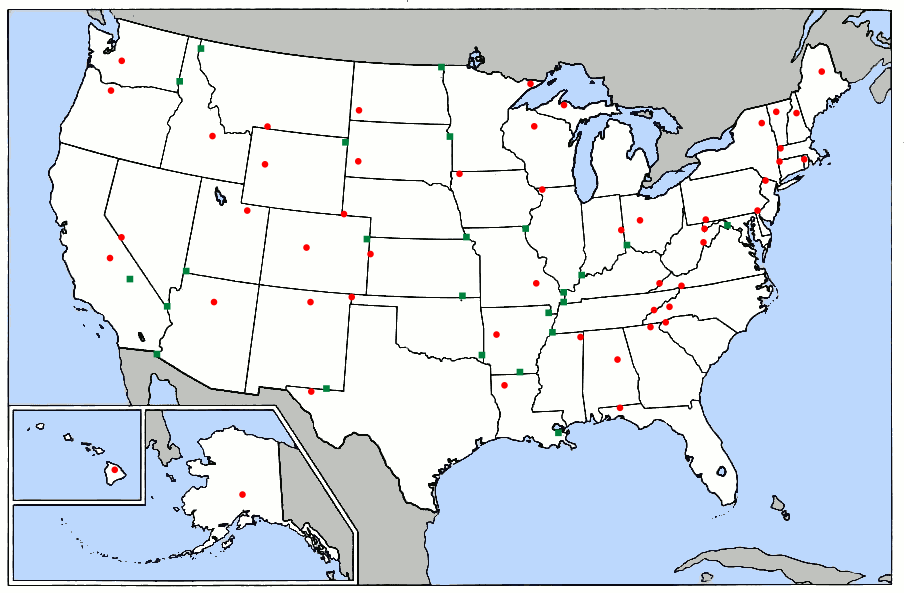
State high points are shown as red circles. Low points are shown with green squares, except in states whose lowest elevation spans coastlines or lake shores (the Great Lakes or Lake Champlain).(See also List of U.S. states by elevation)

Romero is now trying to climb the highest point in each of the 50 US states. He had already climbed Denali in June 2008. (see also Peak bagging (Climbing list))

The "50 US States Summits" Romero has climbed
Year	Summits	State	Elevation ft	Elevation m	Notes
June 2008	Denali	Alaska	20,320	6,194	
August 2012	Kings Peak	Utah	13,286	4,123	
2012	Mount Mansfield	Vermont	4,393	1,338.99	
2012	Mount Washington	New Hampshire	6,288	1,916.58	
2012	Mount Katahdin	Maine	5,269	1,605.99	

== Personal life ==
Romero grew up in Big Bear Lake, California, and currently resides in Portland, Oregon. He was born to Paul Romero and Leigh Anne Drake.

== Historic climb ==
Prior to climbing Everest, Romero had already climbed five of the seven highest peaks in the world in his desire to scale the tallest peaks on the seven continents (counting two for Oceania). He finished the seven summits with Mount Vinson in Antarctica at age 15. Before climbing Everest, Romero's highest peak was Aconcagua, 6,962 m (22,841 ft) in elevation. His group chose a northern route out of Tibet and carried a GPS tracking device and satellite phone. Along the way to the top, Romero conducted an interview from an intermediate base camp 18,700 feet above sea level. Upon reaching Mount Everest's summit, a Skype interview was accomplished and Romero also called his mother, who had been following the climb on a map which included GPS coordinates, pictures and video.

== Criticism ==
Before he climbed Mount Everest, there was some criticism over whether a 13-year-old boy should be allowed to attempt this. David Hillebrandt, medical adviser to the British Mountaineering Council, questioned whether Romero was mentally mature enough and then went on to say, "It is totally against the spirit of true mountaineering. This sounds like it's about mass marketing, money and it's verging on child abuse. Nowadays, people are effectively being winched up (the mountains), using ropes that Sherpas have put in for them. It will all be done for him (Romero). He's a token passenger." Because Nepal does not issue permits to people under 16 years of age, Romero and his team decided to climb from the Tibet side. On June 10, 2010, the Lhasa-based Chinese Tibet Mountaineering Association (CTMA), the official channel through which climbers must apply for permission to attempt peaks in Tibet, announced future age restrictions for all those who reach the top.

== Book ==
After Romero climbed Mount Everest, he and Katherine Blanc wrote a book The Boy Who Conquered Everest: The Jordan Romero Story. At the end of 2014 Romero with Linda LeBlanc wrote another book No Summit out of Sight: The story of Jordan Romero .

== See also ==
- Matt Moniz, did 50 State Summits in 43 days with his father
- Malavath Purna, summited Mount Everest at age 13
- Tyler Armstrong, youngest person to climb Aconcagua in Argentina at the age of 9
