= Lucky Sherpa =

Nepali politician

- लक्की शेर्पा
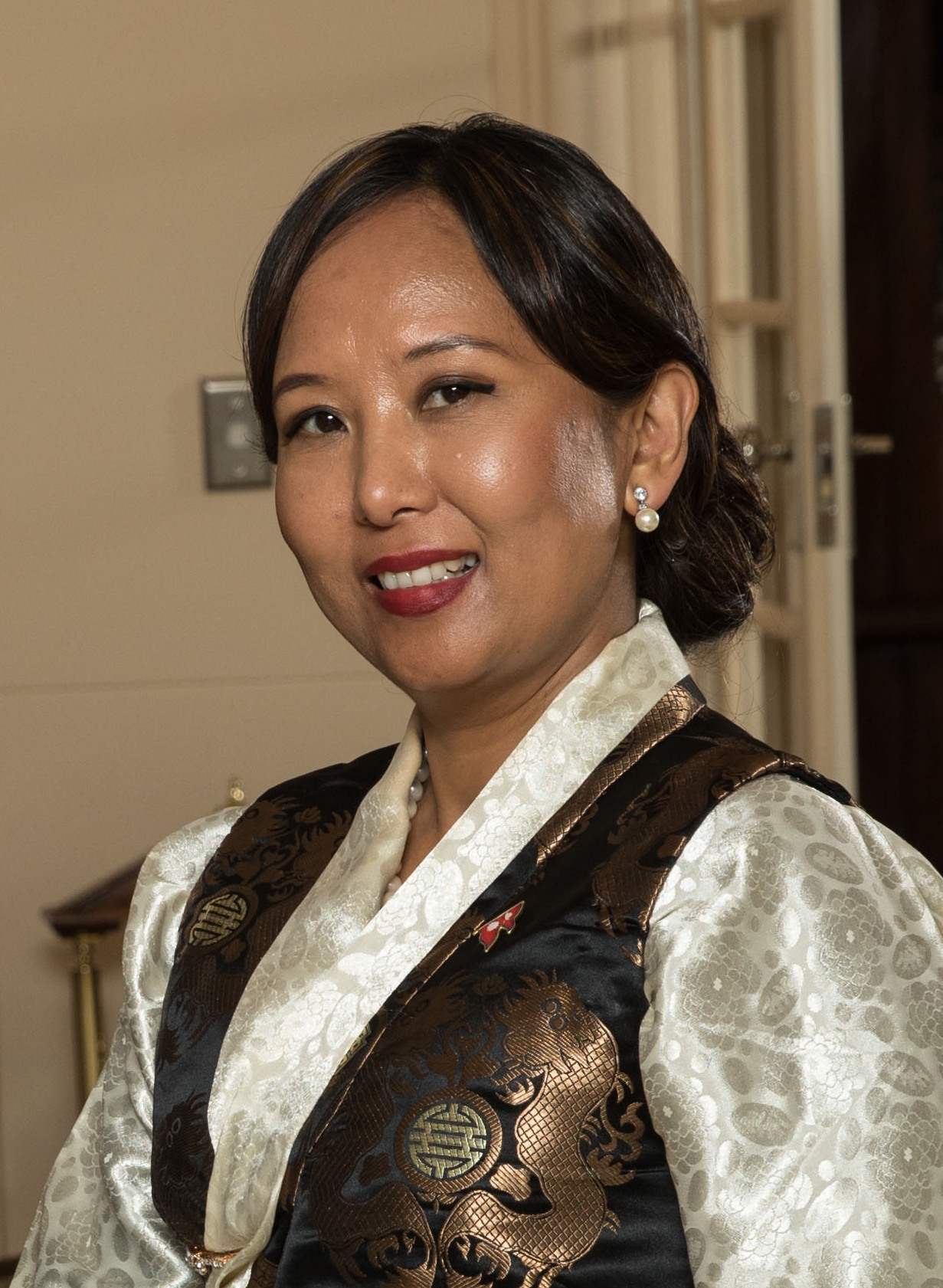
- Sherpa at Australian government house
- Born: Sunsari District, Nepal
- Citizenship: Nepali
- Education: Master's degree in economics
- Occupation: Politician
- Known for: Social and political activism
- Movement: Human rights of indigenous peoples of Nepal

Lucky Sherpa is a politician and social activist from Nepal and former Nepal ambassador to Australia and New Zealand. She was the first indigenous woman and the first representative from the Himalayan communities to be appointed as an ambassador by the Nepal government.

== Educational background ==
She is the first female graduate from the indigenous Sherpa community to hold a master's degree in economics and was the faculty's top student for 2001 from Patan Campus of Tribhuvan University.

== Career ==
Sherpa was an elected member of the Constituent Assembly and Parliament of Nepal (from 2008 to 2012). While in Parliament, Sherpa was a legislative member of the International Relations and Human Rights Community under the Legislative Parliament. Her role is highly acknowledged by women and indigenous communities of Nepal in parliament for institutionalizing the inclusive participation of excluded communities in mainstream politics. As a strong advocate of federalism, Sherpa deliberately lobbied to institutionalize federalism in the new constitution during her tenure as a constituent assembly member in the first constituent assembly.

In 2019, she resigned from her position as ambassador.
