= Tapting =

Tapting टाप्टिङ
- Village development committee
- Location in Nepal
- Coordinates: 27.47°N 86.47°E
- Country: Nepal
- Zone: Sagarmatha Zone
- District: Solukhumbu District

Population (2015)
  - Total: 7,580
- Sherpa/Tamang/Magar etc.
- Time zone: UTC+5:45 (Nepal Time)
- Website: https://www.facebook.com/Tapting.VDC

Tapting is a village development committee in Solukhumbu District in the Sagarmatha Zone of north-eastern Nepal. At the time of the 1991 Nepal census it had a population of 2016 people living in 339 individual households. According to recent population research data in 2015, the population of Tapting VDC is 7580, living in 4850 individual households. Transportation--> = High Way Road is Connected from Capital Kathmandu to Tapting VDC.
