= Melissa Arnot =

American mountaineer

Melissa Arnot Reid (born December 18, 1983) is an American mountaineer. She has climbed to the summit of Mount Everest six times.

== Life and career ==
Arnot was raised just outside Glacier National Park in Whitefish, Montana. After college, she began living out of her car to save money and climb mountains. She first climbed Mount Rainier in 2001 and called it a "watershed moment". Arnot began teaching wilderness medicine in 2002 and began guiding on Mount Rainier with Rainier Mountaineering, Inc. in 2004. By 2006 she was a lead guide.

Since 2001, she has summited Rainier more than 100 times. She is a certified Wilderness EMT and teaches Wilderness EMT courses for Remote Medical International.

In 2008, she joined Jeff Dossett and David Morton on the Everest Team Inspi(RED) to promote HIV/AIDS awareness and Microsoft and Dell products supporting Product Red.

In 2010, she led a celebrity climb up Mount Kilimanjaro to raise awareness for clean water access. The effort, Summit on the Summit, included actors Emile Hirsch, Jessica Biel and Isabel Lucas, musicians Kenna, Lupe Fiasco and Santigold, as well as various scientists and activists, and aired as an MTV special.

In 2013, she helped defuse an assault between three European climbers and a group of a hundred Sherpas; see Mount Everest in 2013.

Her Everest summit attempts in 2014 and 2015 were disrupted by avalanches on Mount Everest.

In 2016, she became the second American woman to summit Mount Everest without supplemental oxygen and the first to survive the descent having summited without supplemental oxygen; another American woman Francys Arsentiev reached the summit without supplemental oxygen in 1998 but died during the descent.

She is currently sponsored by Eddie Bauer and was one of the original six mountain guides, also including Peter Whittaker, Ed Viesturs, Dave Hahn, Seth Waterfall and Chad Peele, who developed products for the 'First Ascent' brand and continues to participate in product development and testing. She is also sponsored by Whittaker Mountaineering, a retail store based in Ashford, Washington.

== Mountain ascents ==
Arnot’s notable big mountain ascents include:

- >100 summits of Mount Rainier (14,410')
- 6th summit of Mount Everest in 2016
- 3 summits of Aconcagua, Argentina (22,841')
- 1 expedition on Denali (20,320')
- 5 summits of Cotopaxi, Ecuador (19,348')
- 2 expeditions on Cayambe, Ecuador (18,997')

== See also ==
- List of Mount Everest summiters by number of times to the summit
