= Sherpa people =

Nepalese ethnic group

Sherpa
ཤར་པ། shar pa
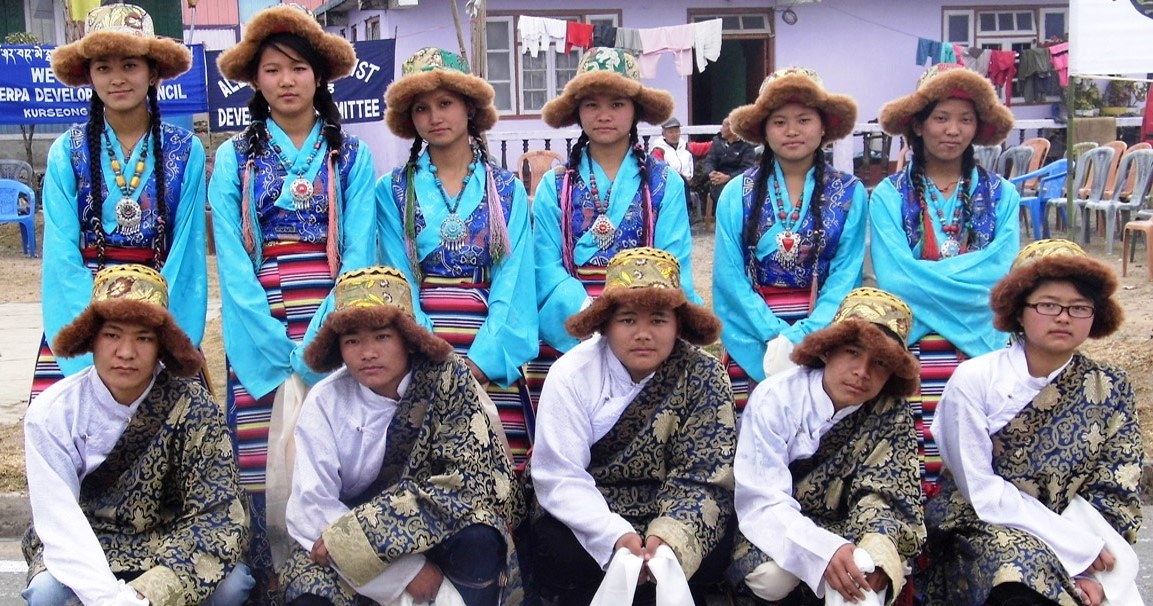
- Young Sherpas in traditional attire at the West Bengal Sherpa Cultural Board

Regions with significant populations
- Nepal: 290,637
- India: 75,000 (above)
- Bhutan: 11,700
- United States: 17,800
- China: 47,000

Languages
- Sherpa, Tibetan, Nepali

Religion
- Predominantly Buddhism (98.9%). Minorities: Christianity and Bön

Related ethnic groups
- Tibetans, Tamang, Rai, Hyolmo, Jirels, and other Tibeto-Burman groups

The Sherpa people (Standard Tibetan: ཤར་པ།, romanized: shar pa) are a Tibetan ethnic group native to the mountainous regions of Nepal, India, and the Tibetan Autonomous Region of China. Most Sherpas live in eastern Nepal: the provinces of Bagmati (mainly in the districts of Dolakha, Sindhupalchok and Rasuwa) and Koshi (mainly in the districts of Solukhumbu, Sankhuwasabha and Taplejung). Some live north of Kathmandu, in the Bigu and Helambu regions. They can also be found in Tingri County, Bhutan, and the Indian states of Sikkim and northern West Bengal (the Darjeeling and Kalimpong districts). Sherpas establish monasteries known as gompas in these regions, where they follow their local traditions. Tengboche was the first celibate monastery in Solu-Khumbu.

The Sherpa language is part of the southern branch of the Tibeto-Burman languages, mixed with eastern (Khams Tibetan) and central Tibetan dialects. This language is separate from Lhasa Tibetan, and is unintelligible to Lhasa speakers.

The Sherpa people are associated with mountaineering, and many work as mountaineering and climbing guides in the Himalayas region. They have been instrumental in the first ascents of a number of Himalayan peaks, most notably in 1953 when Sherpa mountaineer Tenzing Norgay became one of the first two people to reach the summit of Mount Everest.

== History ==
Sherpas are descended from nomads who settled in the Himalayas near Mount Everest: the Khumbu and Solu regions of Mahālangūr Himāl. This area is along the border between Nepal and China. It is in the Solukhumbu District of Koshi, the easternmost province of Nepal and south of China's Tibet Autonomous Region.

Oral Sherpa history lists four clans who migrated from Kham to Solukhumbu: Minyakpa, Thimmi, Lamas Sherwa, and Chawa. These clans evolved into more than 20 groups. During the 13th and 14th centuries, conflict with Mahayana Buddhism may have contributed to Sherpa migration from Tibet to Nepal's Khumbu regions. Before crossing into the Himalayas, Sherpa migrants traveled through Ü and Tsang.

By the 15th century, the Khumbu Sherpas attained autonomy in newly-formed Nepal. As tensions with China increased in the 1960s, Nepali government influence on the Sherpas grew. Khumbu became a national park in 1976, and tourism became a major economic sector.

The word sherpa derives from the Tibetan words shar (ཤར, 'east') and pa (པ, 'people'). The reason for this derivation is unclear, but a common explanation notes that the Sherpas originated in eastern Tibet. The community is based in the Nepalese highlands, however, which is south of Tibet.

=== Genetics ===
Genetic studies indicate that much of the Sherpa population has allele frequencies which are often found in other Tibeto-Burman regions. In tested genes, the strongest affinity was for Tibetan-population-sample studies in the Tibet Autonomous Region. Genetically, the Sherpa cluster is closest to the sample Tibetan and Han populations. According to Wang et al. (2021), Dingjie Sherpa demonstrated a close genetic relationship with East Asian reference populations (especially Sino-Tibetan-speaking populations and Tokyo Japanese). The Sherpa also exhibited an affinity for several Himalayan tribes; the strongest was for the Rai people, followed by the Magars and Tamang.

A 2010 study identified more than 30 genetic factors that make Tibetan bodies well-suited for high altitudes, including EPAS1: the "super-athlete gene" which regulates the body's production of hemoglobin, allowing greater efficiency in the use of oxygen. A 2016 study of Sherpas in Tibet suggested that a small portion of Sherpa and Tibetan allele frequencies originated from separate ancient populations which were estimated to have been distributed for 7,000 to 11,000 years.

==== Haplogroup distribution ====
A 2014 study found that substantial genetic components from the Indian subcontinent were found in Tibetan Sherpas. The western Y chromosomal haplogroups R1a1a-M17, J-M304, and F*-M89 make up almost 17 percent of the paternal gene pool in tested individuals. on the maternal side, M5c2, M21d, and U from the west are found in up to eight percent of people in a given Sherpa population. A 2015 study did not support the results of the previous year's study; the 2015 study concluded that genetic sharing from the Indian subcontinent was limited, and a 2017 study reached the same conclusion.

In a 2015 study of 582 Sherpas (277 males) from China and Nepal, haplogroup D-M174 was found most frequently, followed by Haplogroup O-M175, Haplogroup F-M89 and Haplogroup K-M9. The Y-chromosome haplogroup distribution for Sherpas follows a pattern similar to that of Tibetans.

Sherpa mtDNA distribution shows greater diversity; Haplogroup A was found most frequently, followed by Haplogroup M9a, Haplogroup C4a, Haplogroup M70, and Haplogroup D. These haplogroups are also found in some Tibetan populations. Two common mtDNA sub-haplogroups unique to Sherpas populations were identified: Haplogroup A15c1 and Haplogroup C4a3b1.

== Mountaineering ==
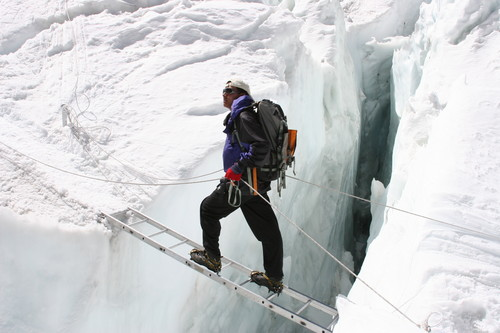
Sherpa mountain guide Pem Dorjee Sherpa at the Khumbu Icefall

A number of Sherpas are considered elite mountaineers and experts in their local area. They were valuable to early Himalayan explorers as guides at extreme altitudes through the region's peaks and passes, particularly for Mount Everest expeditions. The term Sherpa is often used by foreigners to refer to almost any guide or climbing supporter hired for Himalayan mountaineering (regardless of ethnicity), and has become a synonym for a guide or mentor in other situations. Sherpas are known in the international climbing and mountaineering community for their hardiness, expertise, and experience at very high altitudes. It has been speculated that part of the Sherpas' climbing ability is the result of a genetic adaptation to living in high altitudes which may include unique hemoglobin-binding capacity and doubled nitric oxide production.

=== Deaths on Everest ===
A serac (or ice tower) collapsed above the Khumbu Icefall on Mount Everest on 18 April 2014, causing an avalanche of ice and snow which killed 16 Nepalese Sherpa guides. The avalanche was the deadliest disaster in Everest-climbing history, until it was surpassed by an avalanche on 25 April 2015 which killed 22 people. In response to the 2014 tragedy, and other incidents involving deaths and injuries, along with the lack of government support for Sherpas injured or killed while providing their services, some Sherpa climbing guides resigned and their companies stopped providing guides and porters for Everest expeditions.

An icefall is an area of turbulent flow of ice, somewhat analogous to a waterfall. Icefalls, which form where the glacier bed steepens or narrows, have ongoing structural shifts, requiring continuous changes to the route through the area. This makes the Khumbu Icefall one of the most dangerous stretches of the Everest ascent. Climbers walk on ladders over crevasses, which can be up to 50 metres (160 ft) deep, and under large seracs, which can weigh as much as several thousand tons and could collapse at any time. The passage through the Khumbu Icefall is often made at night because the ice is more stable when temperatures are lower. 66 people had died by 2017, including six deaths from falls into crevasses, nine from a collapsing icefall section, and 29 from avalanches on the icefall.

The families of those who died in the 2014 avalanche were offered 40,000 rupees (about US$400) from the Nepalese government. At the time of the avalanche, the Sherpas were carrying loads of equipment for their clients which included luxury items. Two broken ladders caused a traffic jam in the Khumbu Icefall. It is not uncommon for Sherpas to go through the icefall about 30 times each season, but individual foreigners only go through the icefall two or three times per season. Sherpas are expected to haul most of their clients' gear to each of the five camps and to set up before their clients reach them. During each two- or three-month season, they typically earn up to $5,000 for guiding international clients to the summit of Everest. In 2019, expeditions on Mount Everest contributed $300 million to the Nepalese economy.

As a result of the 2014 disaster, the remaining Sherpas went on strike. They were angry at the government's lack of compensation and their working conditions. Sherpas united days after the disaster to make a list of demands for the government. The 2015 documentary Sherpa includes footage of a meeting. The Sherpas wanted to cancel the climbing season that year out of respect for those who were killed, saying that "this route has become a graveyard" and asking, "How could we walk over their bodies?" Their clients were debating whether or not to continue trying to reach the summit of Everest because of the money they had paid to be there. International clients, concerned by the strike, had their bags packed for a quick getaway. Rumors spread through the Sherpa community about retaliation if they continued to take foreigners on expeditions.

In 2015, 10 Sherpas died at an Everest base camp after the earthquake. A total of 118 Sherpas died on Mount Everest between 1921 and 2018. According to an April 2018 NPR report, Sherpas account for one-third of Everest deaths.

== Religion ==
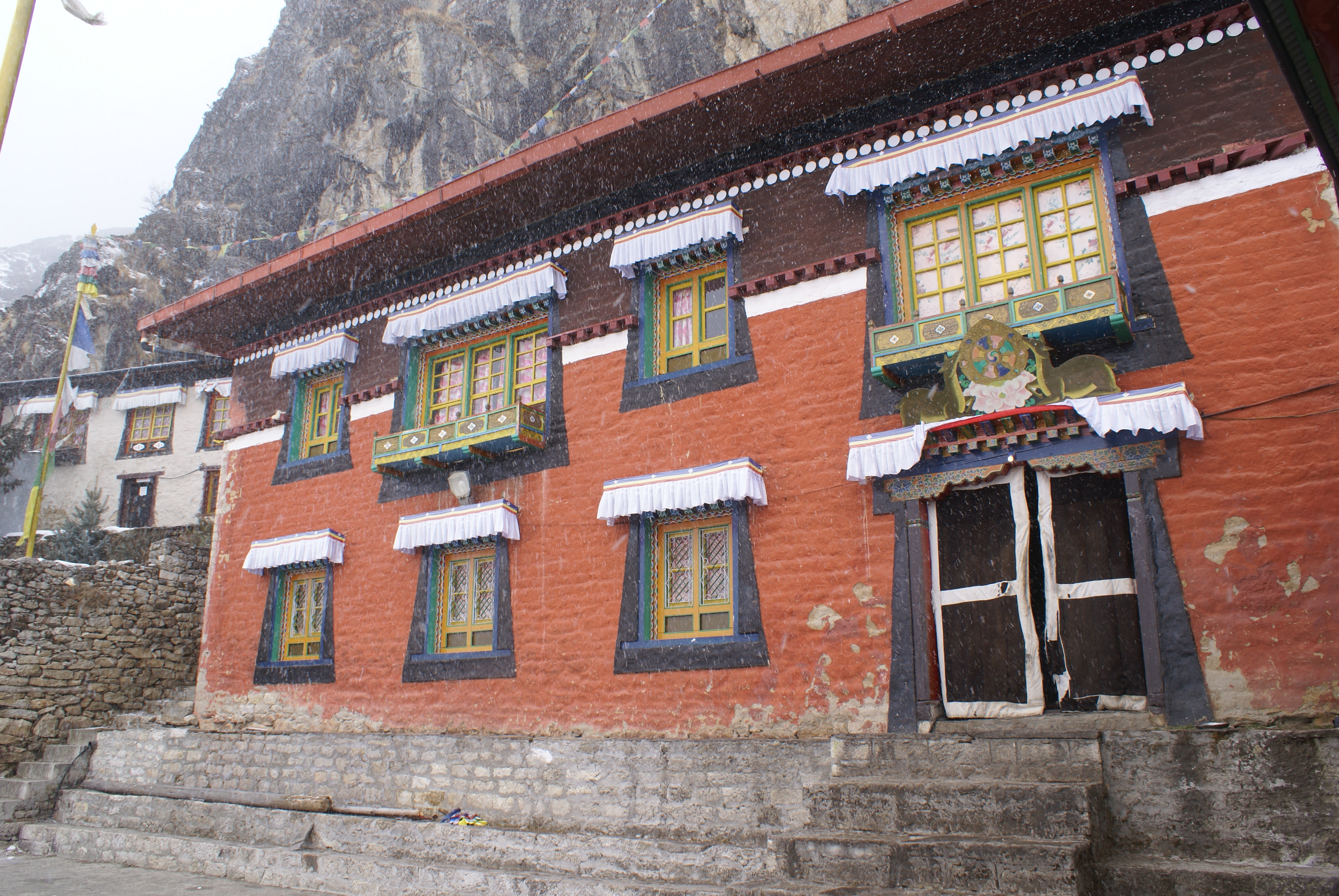
Thame Gompa is one of a number of Sherpa monasteries in Nepal

According to oral Buddhist tradition, the initial Tibetan migration was a search for beyul (hidden valleys). Sherpas follow the Nyingma school, the oldest of Tibetan Buddhism's four major schools. Founded by Padmasambhava (commonly known as Guru Rinpoche) during the eighth century, Nyingma emphasizes mysticism and the incorporation of local deities shared by the shamanistic, pre-Buddhist Bön religion. Sherpas particularly believe in hidden teachings. Traditional Nyingmapa practice was passed down orally through a loose network of lay practitioners. Monasteries with celibate monks and nuns, and the belief in reincarnated spiritual leaders, are later adaptations.

In addition to Buddha and the Buddhist divinities, the Sherpa also believe in gods and demons who inhabit mountains, caves, and forests and are respected or appeased with ancient practices woven into the fabric of Buddhist ritual life. Many Himalayan mountains are considered sacred. The Sherpa call Mount Everest "Chomolungma", and consider it the "mother of the world"; Mount Makalu is revered as the deity Shankar (Shiva). Each clan worships certain mountain peaks and their protective deities.

Day-to-day Sherpa religious affairs are presided over by village lamas (Buddhist spiritual leaders) and other religious practitioners. A lama, who presides over ceremonies and rituals, can be a celibate monk or a married householder. Shamans (lhawa) and soothsayers (mindung) also deal with the supernatural and the spirit world.

An important aspect of Sherpa religion is the temple (gompa), a prayer hall for villages or monasteries. A number of gompas and about two dozen monasteries are scattered across Solukhumbu District. Monasteries are communities of lamas or monks (sometimes of nuns) who take a vow of celibacy and lead a life of isolation in their search for truth and religious enlightenment.

== Sagarmatha National Park ==
Mount Everest is in Sagarmatha National Park, which is sacred to local Sherpas. The park is considered inhabited by supernatural beings. Sherpas value life and the beauty it provides, and avoid killing living creatures. Mount Everest has attracted many tourists who, unknowingly or knowingly, disrupt the park's sacred land; finding firewood is considered problematic. A number of tourists cut down trees or pull branches off them to make a fire, a practice which violates the Sherpas' spiritual law of the land. Sherpas perform a spiritual ritual asking the mountain for permission to climb it, a spectacle for foreign climbers.

Although the park is not governed by the Sherpas, park managers have made an effort to include Sherpa voices by creating buffer-zone groups. The groups, consisting of political leaders from surrounding villages, are a platform for Sherpa demands. They do not have official status, however, and the government can decide whether to hear demands or make changes.

== Clothing ==
Men wear a long-sleeved robe known as a chuba, which falls slightly below the knee. A chuba is tied at the waist with a cloth sash (kara), creating a pouch-like namdok which can store and carry small items. Chuba were traditionally made from thick home-spun wool, or a variant (lokpa) made from sheepskin. Chuba are worn over raatuk, a blouse (traditionally made from bure, white raw silk), trousers (kanam), and a stiff-collared shirt (tetung).

Women traditionally wear long-sleeved floor-length dresses known as tongkok. A sleeveless variation (aangi) is worn over a long-sleeved shirt (honju), with a raatuk under the shirt. These are worn with colourful striped aprons; pangden (or metil) aprons are worn in front, and gewe (or gyabtil) in back. Both are held together by an embossed silver buckle (kyetig) and a kara.

Sherpa clothing resembles Tibetan clothing. Home-spun wool and silk are being increasingly replaced by factory-made material. Many Sherpas also wear ready-made Western clothing.

== Traditional housing ==
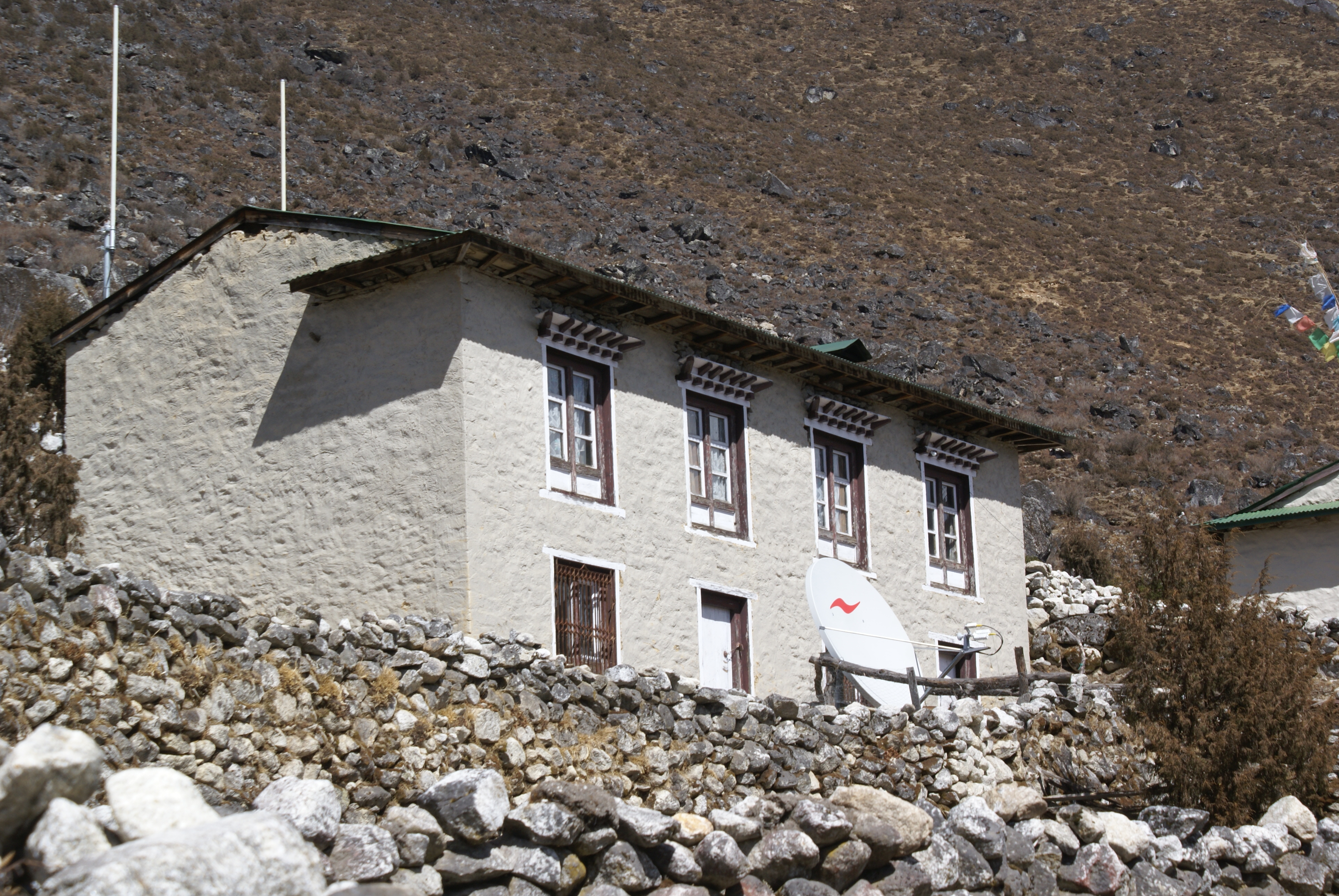
Traditional Sherpa architecture, with a steel roof

When a son marries and has children, the community may help build a new house as his extended family becomes too large for a single home. Neighbours often contribute food, drinks and labour to help the family. Houses are typically spaced with fields between them. A spiritual ceremony may be conducted at each building stage, since the house must have space for deities, humans and animals. Houses are often handed down within a family, not sold. A house style depends on the lay of the land: old river terraces, former lake beds, or mountain slopes; there are stone single-story, 1 1/2-story (on a slope), and two-story houses, with ample room for animals. Many well-to-do families have a shrine room for sacred statues, scriptures and ritual objects. Roofs are sloping, and made from local materials or imported metal. Space in the roof allows fire smoke to escape, and a composting toilet may be indoors or in an outhouse.

== Social gatherings ==
"A Sherpa community will most commonly get together for a party, which is held by the host with the purpose of gaining favour with the community and neighbours". Guests are invited by the host's children hours before the party begins. Men are seated by status at social gatherings, with those having lower status sitting closer to the door and those with higher status sitting by the fireplace; women sit in the center, with no particular order. It is considered polite to sit lower than one's proper place, so one may be invited by the host to their proper place. The first several hours of the party will have only beer served, followed by the serving of food and several more hours of singing and dancing before guests begin to leave. Manipulating one's neighbours into cooperation by hosting a party is known as Yangdzi, and the hospitality is expected to be reciprocated.

== Demographics ==
The Central Bureau of Statistics of Nepal classifies the Sherpa as a subgroup within the broader social group of Mountain/Hill Janajati. At the time of the 2023 Nepal census, 250,637 people (1.1% of the population of Nepal) were Sherpa. Just 9,435 of them speak second language. The frequency of Sherpa people by province was as follows:

- Koshi Province (9%)
- Bagmati Province (6.0%)
- Gandaki Province (0.0%)
- Karnali Province (3.0%)
- Lumbini Province (0.0%)
- Madhesh Province (0.0%)
- Sudurpashchim Province (0.0%)

The frequency of Sherpa people was higher than national average (0.4%) in the following districts:

- Solukhumbu (24.6%)
- Taplejung (21.5%)
- Okhaldhunga (11.0%)
- Sankhuwasabha (15.8%)
- Dolakha (8.8%)
- Sindhupalchowk (7.6%)
- Ramechhap (4.0%)
- Bhojpur (1.7%)
- Kathmandu (2.3%)
- Ilam (3.2%)
- Tehrathum (1.1%)
- Mustang (8%)
- Khotang (0.7%)
- Dhankuta (0.5%)
- Dolpa (49%)

== Notable people ==
- Tenzing Norgay — in 1953, he and Edmund Hillary became the first people known to have reached the summit of Mount Everest.
- Temba Tsheri — in 2001, he became the youngest person to climb Mount Everest.
- Nimdoma Sherpa — in 2008, she became the youngest woman to climb Mount Everest.
- Kami Rita — mountaineering guide who holds the record for most ascents to the summit of Mount Everest.
- Lhakpa Sherpa — she became the first Nepali woman to climb and descend Mount Everest successfully in 2000, and after her tenth climb in 2022 became the woman to have climbed Everest the most times.
- Pasang Lhamu Sherpa — in 1993, she became the first Nepalese woman to climb the summit of Mount Everest, but died during the descent.
- Apa Sherpa — for several years, he jointly held the record for reaching the summit of Mount Everest more times than any other climber.
- Dawa Yangzum Sherpa — first Nepalese woman to summit all 14 eight-thousanders.
- Pemba Doma Sherpa — one of six women to have summited Everest twice and founder of the charity Save the Himalayan Kingdom.
- Nima Rinji — the youngest person to have climbed the world's 14 highest mountains.
- Mingma Sherpa — first South Asian to scale all 14 eight thousanders and the first mountaineer to climb all 14 peaks on the first attempt.
- Sanduk Ruit — ophthalmologist who developed inexpensive intraocular lenses for the developing world and winner of the Ramon Magsaysay Award.
- Jamling Tenzing Norgay — mountain climber and son of Tenzing Norgay.
- Chhurim Sherpa — first woman to climb Mount Everest twice in the same season.
- Chhang Dawa Sherpa — for several years, he was the youngest climber to have summited the world's 14 highest peaks.
- Pemba Dorje — mountain climber who may have made the fastest ever ascent of Mount Everest.
- Pratima Sherpa — highly ranked amateur female golfer.
- Dachhiri Sherpa — Olympic athlete who represented Nepal in the Winter Olympics.
- Kripasur Sherpa — Nepalese politician and member of the 2nd Nepalese Constituent Assembly.
- Ang Tshiring Sherpa — founder of Yeti Airlines and Air Dynasty.
- Lucky Sherpa — former Nepal ambassador to Australia and New Zealand.

== See also ==
- Gyalpo Losar, new year festival of the Sherpa people
- Mani Rimdu, festival celebrated in the Everest region
- Sherpa names
- Demographics of Nepal
- List of monasteries in Nepal
- Sherpa (emissary)
- Tenzing (film), a 2026 film focusing on Norgay Tenzing's 1953 ascent of Everest
