= Lhakpa Sherpa =

Nepalese mountain climber (born 1973)

Personal information
- Born: Lhakpa Sherpa; 1973 (age 52–53) Makalu, Nepal
- Occupation: Mountaineer
- Spouse: Gheorghe Dijmărescu (Divorced)
- Children: 3

Climbing career
- Major ascents: Everest summit: 11

Lhakpa Sherpa (Nepali: Lakhpa Sherpa; born 1973) is a Nepalese Sherpa mountaineer. She has climbed Mount Everest 11 times, the most by any woman in the world. Her record-breaking 10th climb was on May 12, 2022, which she financed via a crowd-funding campaign. In 2000, she became the first Nepali woman to climb and descend Everest successfully. In 2016, she was listed as one of BBC's 100 Women.

== Early life ==
Lhakpa Sherpa was born in a cave one of 11 children, growing up in Balakharka, a village in the Makalu, Nepal region of the Himalayas. In Nepal, only boys were allowed to go to school. She carried her brother two hours to school and back.

== Career ==
In 2000 she was the leader of an expedition sponsored by Asian Trekking. On May 18, 2000, she became the first Nepali woman to summit Mount Everest and survive (see also Pasang Lhamu Sherpa). The climb was with the Nepali Women Millennium Expedition. In 2003, PBS noted that she had summited Mount Everest three times, the most for a woman. In May 2003 she reached the summit with her sister and brother; Ming Kipa and Mingma Gelu.

By 2007, Lhakpa Sherpa had summited Everest six times since 1999 and her husband summited nine. In 2007, they hosted a presentation about their 2007 Everest trip, with donations taken for Quaker Lane Cooperative Nursery School. They summited Mount Everest five times together. In 2016 she summited Mount Everest from Tibet (China), making her seventh summit. Maya Sherpa, the president of Mount Everest Summiteers' Association and a Nepali woman and high-altitude worker also summited, but from Nepal. Maya Sherpa is another record-setting Nepali woman; she has also summited K2.

In 2022, Lhakpa Sherpa summited Everest a 10th time, thereby beating her own record of being the woman who has summited Everest most often. In doing so, she beat her late husband Gheorghe Dijmărescu's nine successful summits before his death in 2020. Netflix made a documentary about her 10th summit, Mountain Queen: The Summits of Lhakpa Sherpa, beginning with her moving to the U.S .to her tenth summit. The documentary later won the Grand Prize at the 2024 Kendal Mountain Festival's International Film Competition.

== Climbing career achievements ==
Everest summiting:

1. 2000
2. 2001
3. 2003
4. 2004
5. 2005
6. 2006
7. 2016
8. 2017
9. 2018
10. 2022
11. 2026

K2 Summits:

1. 2023 July 27

Additional expeditions:

- Expedition to climb K2 in 2010, did not summit but made it to camp 3 before being turned back by bad weather.
- Expedition to Everest in 2015; made it to base camp in Tibet, but turned back by the Spring earthquakes in the Himalayas. (see also 2015 Mount Everest avalanches and/or April 2015 Nepal earthquake)

In 2016, she was listed among the BBC's 100 most inspirational and influential women. On 24 April 2023 Lhakpa won India's prestigious Tenzing Norgay National Adventure award. She has also received sponsorship to climb K2.

== Personal life ==
Lhakpa is named for the day of the week she was born on (Wednesday). She is now a U.S. resident, along with two of her siblings. Due to her lack of formal education, she has worked as a housekeeper and at various odd jobs, including for 7-Eleven and Whole Foods Market.

In interviews she has expressed her continued desire to continue her mountaineering activities, similar to such climbers as George Mallory and Yuichiro Miura. She has two daughters, Sunny and Shiny, and one son, Nima, from a previous relationship.

=== Marriage and divorce ===
She was married to Gheorghe Dijmărescu, a Romanian-American refugee, for 12 years. They met in 2000 at a party hosted by the governments of Pakistan and Nepal after she had just completed her first Everest summit and he his second. After a courtship mediated by her siblings in the USA since she did not speak much English, the couple married in 2002. After marriage, she left her home in Nepal and moved to Hartford, Connecticut, where she and Gheorghe found work in construction.

After the birth of their first child, Gheorghe became physically and verbally abusive to her and other family members. Barring one attempt at a written apology to her when he was diagnosed with sarcoma and experiencing financial hardship in 2011, the abuse persisted throughout their marriage, with several of his violent outbursts documented by witnesses, journalists, and medical personnel. Due to the fraught domestic situation, her son Nima had to stay at her brother's home nearby.

One of the most notorious incidents occurred during the 2004 Connecticut Everest Expedition, when Dijmărescu assaulted Lhakpa in front of other climbers until she lost consciousness. Dijmărescu also threatened to harm the expedition members who published photographs and vlogs of the incident. According to Michael Kodas, a journalist who witnessed the altercation, Dijmărescu, "hook[ed] a blow with his right hand to the side of his wife's head." The outrage amongst the climbing community did not deter Dijmărescu, who had already gained a bad reputation among other expedition leaders for price gouging and scamming people for supplies.

In 2012, after Lhakpa had informed him that their food assistance card could not be used to purchase alcohol, Dijmărescu beat her so brutally that she had to be taken to the emergency room. A hospital social worker finally convinced her to stay in a local shelter with her daughters. Despite Dijmărescu's threats of killing her and the children if she tried to leave, she refused to return to their residence, and the marriage was dissolved in 2015, with Lhakpa being awarded sole custody of her daughters.

=== Relatives ===
Her brother, Mingma Gelu Sherpa, had summited Mount Everest eight times by 2016. Her little sister Ming, climbing with Lhakpa and Gelu, reached the summit of Mount Everest on May 22, 2003, when she was 15 years old, thus becoming the youngest person at the time to have summited Mount Everest.

Their summit in 2003 was the first group of three siblings on the summit at the same time, as recognized by the Guinness Book of World Records.

== Media appearances ==
Lucy Walker's 2024 documentary Mountain Queen: The Summits of Lhakpa Sherpa is about Lhakpa Sherpas' life.

== See also ==
- Apa Sherpa
- Chhurim
- Lakpa Gelu
- List of Mount Everest records
- List of Mount Everest summiteers by frequency
- Shriya Shah-Klorfine (Canadian woman who died on descent of Everest)
- List of 20th-century summiteers of Mount Everest
