= List of Mount Everest guides =

Professional mountaineering guides

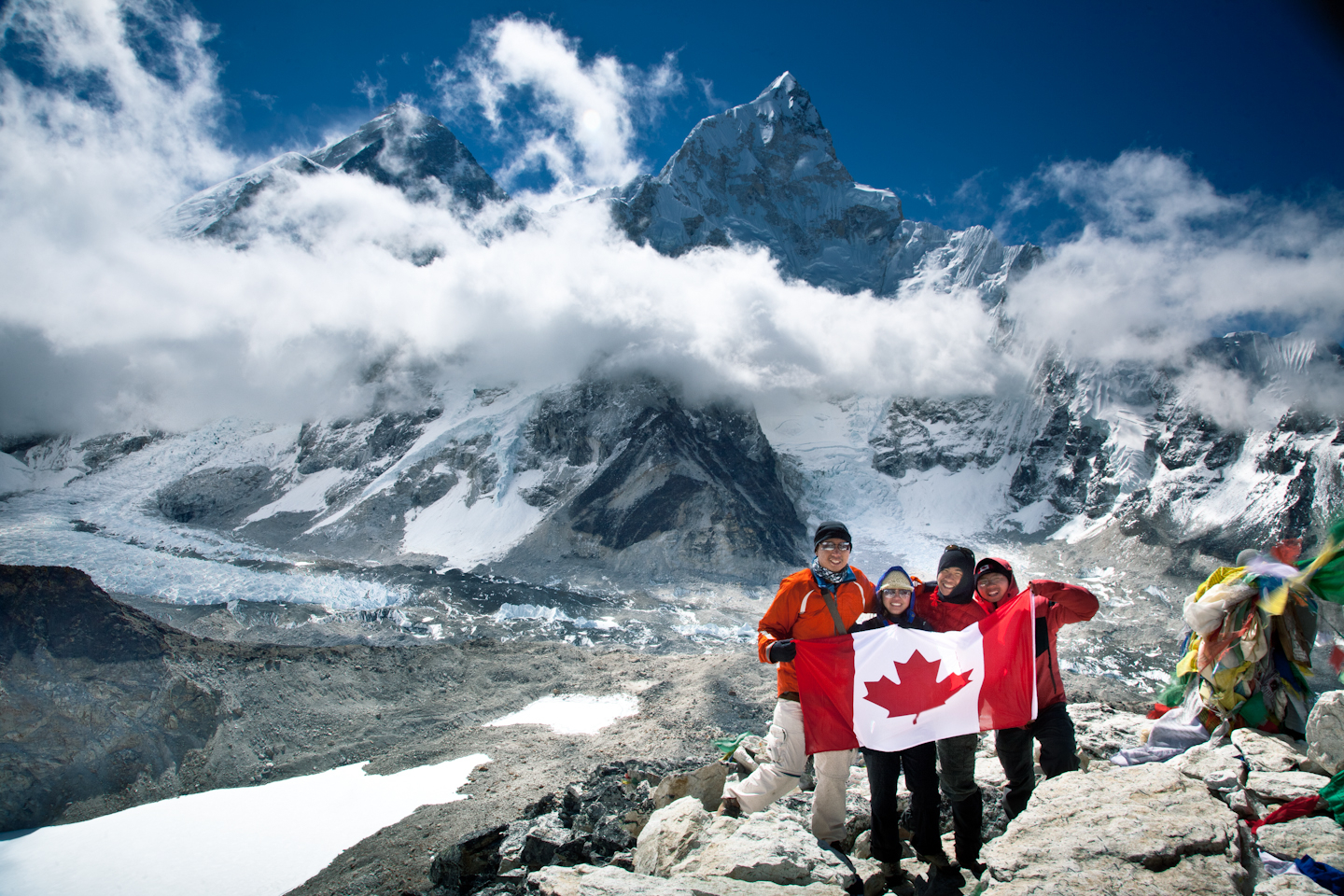
A guide helped this group of Canadians trek near to Everest (in the background on top-left), to the nearby Kala Pathar peak.

This is a list of notable Mount Everest guides, which are professional mountaineers (and mountaineering firms) who help people to ascend Mount Everest in the Himalayas in return for fees. Previously, the summit was only accessible to expert mountaineers who were often self-guided, or assisted by local sherpas.

== Role ==
Guides can, for example, set fixed lines of rope for others to use, organize rescues in times of trouble, or use communication tools to call in helicopter evacuations. Another job on Mount Everest is as an "icefall doctor" using ladders and ropes to make a path across the Khumbu Icefall, which guides might do themselves or delegate to others. Guides, especially if they are guiding for a mountaineering or adventure company, often call the people they help up "clients".

Another task on Everest is helping people with medical problems, although the work can be dangerous. When potentially deadly health conditions strike, the guides can sometimes lose their clients or abort the climb. One mother of two died after developing a health problem at the Everest base camp.

Mount Everest guides assist climbers on what are called "guided" climbs, and guided ascent can cost double an unguided one. Many climbers in more recent times are unguided but can get some support from a Sherpa, which, though more similar to an Alpinist porter, is much cheaper and also called a guide. The term guide can mean something along the lines of an assistant all the way to a World-famous mountaineer.

== Notable guides ==
- Adrian Ballinger
- Andy Harris
- Andy Tyson
- Anatoli Boukreev
- Andrew LockHome
- Arnold Coster
- Bill Allen
- Dan Nash
- Daniel Mazur
- Dave Hahn
- David Breashears
- David Hamilton
- David Morton
- Jacob Schmitz
- Dean Staples
- Eric Simonson
- Garrett Madison
- Gheorghe Dijmărescu
- Kenton Cool
- Lydia Bradey
- Mike Hamill
- Mark Whetu
- Mark Woodward
- Michael Horst
- Michael Groom
- Mike Roberts
- Neal Beidleman
- Phil Crampton
- Phil Ershler
- Rob Hall
- Russell Brice
- Scott Fischer
- Vernon Tejas
- Wally Berg
- Ryan Waters
- Willie Benegas

== Notable Nepali guides ==
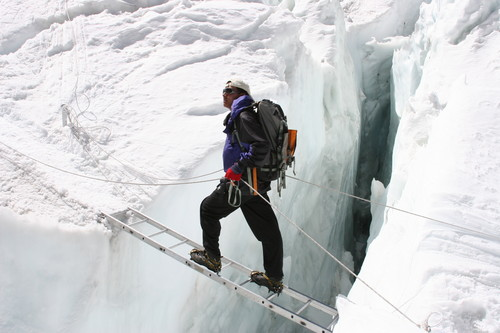
Pem Dorjee Sherpa transverses a crevasse in the ice

- Ang Rita (Angrita Sherpa)
- Ang Dorje Sherpa
- Ang Tharkay
- Apa Sherpa
- Babu Chiri Sherpa
- Kami Rita Sherpa
- Kili Pemba Sherpa
- Lakpa Gelu
- Lopsang Jangbu Sherpa
- Nawang Gombu
- Pasang Dawa Sherpa
- Pem Dorjee Sherpa
- Pertemba (Pertemba Sherpa)
- Phurba Tashi
- Sungdare Sherpa
- Temba Tsheri
- Tashi Tenzing
- Tenzing Norgay

== Notable firms ==
- Adventure Consultants
- Asian Trekking
- Himex (Himalayan Experience)
- Jagged Globe
- Mountain Madness

== See also ==
- List of summiteers of Mount Everest
- List of people who died climbing Mount Everest
- Nepal Mountaineering Association
