= List of 20th-century summiteers of Mount Everest =

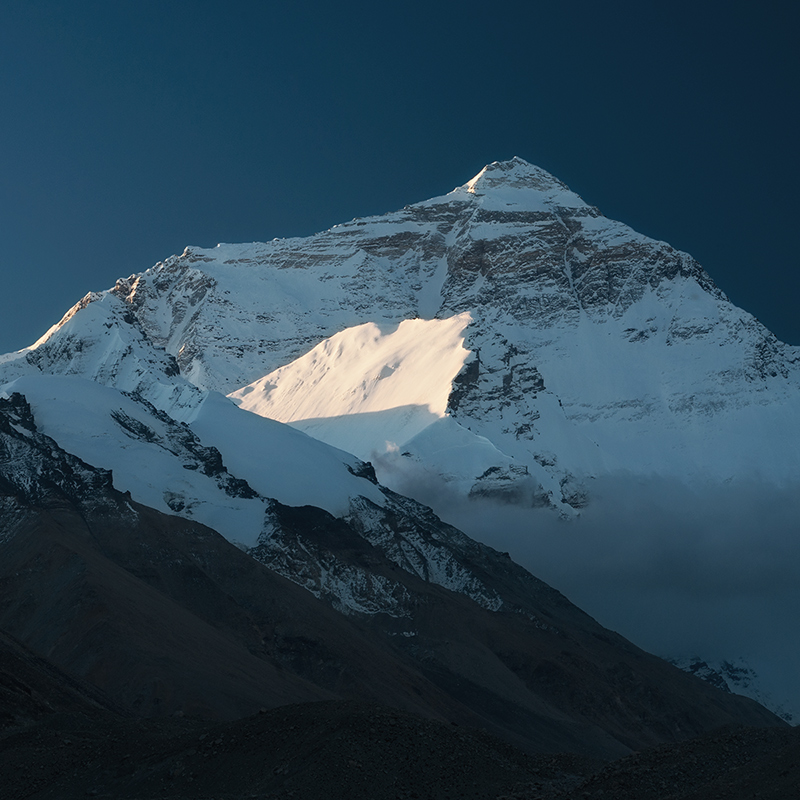
Mount Everest from the northern side. The snowy peak catching light in front of Everest is Changtse.

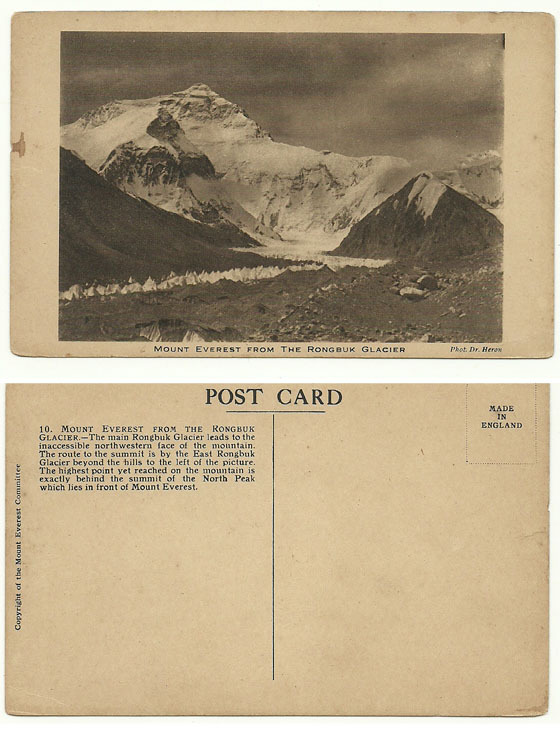
A post-card of Everest from the 1920s, the view from Rongbuk glacier (north side)

Mount Everest is the world's highest mountain at 8,848.86 metres (29,031.7 ft) and thus a particularly desirable peak for mountaineers. This is a list of people who reached the summit of Mount Everest in the 20th century. Overall about 1,383 people summited Everest between 1953 and the end of 2000. After 2000, the number of climbers greatly increased when the peak became more accessible and more popular. By 2013, 6,871 summits had been recorded by 4,042 different people.

== 1950s ==
Only six people summited Mount Everest in the 1950s:

- Sir Edmund Hillary and Tenzing Norgay on May 29, 1953 (1953 British Mount Everest expedition)
- Ernst Schmied and Jürg Marmet on May 23, 1956
- Dölf Reist and Hansruedi von Gunten on May 24, 1956

== 1960s ==
In total, 18 people summited in the 1960s. These are the ascents:

- Wang Fuzhou, Gonpo Dorje, and Chu Ying-hua on May 25, 1960. The 1960 Chinese Mount Everest expedition was the first to successfully climb Mount Everest by the North Ridge.
- Jim Whittaker and Nawang Gombu on May 1, 1963, on the 1963 American Mount Everest expedition
- Barry Bishop, Lute Jerstad, Willi Unsoeld and Tom Hornbein on May 22, 1963, on the 1963 American Mount Everest expedition
- Nawang Gombu and eight others Indian Everest Expedition 1965 on May 20, 1965
- Avtar Singh Cheema
- Sonam Gyatso
- Sonam Wangyal
- C. P. Vohra
- Ang Kami
- H. P. S. Ahluwalia
- H. C. S. Rawat
- Phu Dorjee Sherpa

== 1970s ==
In total, 78 people summited in the 1970s. These are some of the most notable ascents:

- Four summited via South Col on the Saburo Matsukata 1970 expedition:
1. Teruo Matsuura
2. Naomi Uemura
3. Katsutoshi Hirabayashi
4. Chottare Sherpa
- Junko Tabei and Sherpa Ang Tshering I on May 16, 1975
- Phanthog on May 27, 1975
- Doug Scott and Dougal Haston on September 24, 1975 (1975 British Mount Everest Southwest Face expedition)
- Peter Boardman and Sirdar Pertemba Sherpa on September 26, 1975
- Brummie Stokes and Bronco Lane on May 16, 1976 (1976 British Army expedition)
- Ko Sang-don and Pemba Norbu Sherpa on Sept 15, 1977
- Reinhold Messner and Peter Habeler on 8 May 1978 (first ascent of Everest without supplementary oxygen)
- Austrian Franz Oppurg summited solo in 1978
- Sixteen people summited in October 1978 as part of the Franco-Deutsch expedition led by Dr. Karl Herrligkoffer:
1. Hubert Hillmaier
2. Sepp Mack (without supplementary oxygen)
3. Hans Engl (without supplementary oxygen)
4. Pierre Mazeaud
5. Nicolas Jaeger
6. Kurt Diemberger
7. Jean Afanassieff
8. Wanda Rutkiewicz
9. Robert Allenbach
10. Siegfried Hupfauer
11. Wilhelm Klimek
12. Ang Dorje (without supplementary oxygen)
13. Mingma Sherpa (without supplementary oxygen)
14. Ang Kami
15. George Ritter
16. Berndt Kullmann
- Sungdare Sherpa on 2 October 1979
- Andrej Štremfelj and Nejc Zaplotnik on May 13, 1979
- Stipe Božić, Stane Belak and Sherpa Ang Phu on May 15, 1979 (1979 Yugoslav Mount Everest expedition)

== 1980s ==
In the 1980s, 871 climbers set off from Base Camp; around 180 made the summit; and 56 died. Overall about 356 people summited Everest between 1953 and the end of 1989. These are some of the most notable ascents of the 1980s:

- Leszek Cichy and Krzysztof Wielicki on February 17, 1980 (first winter ascent)
- Takashi Ozaki and Tsuneo Shigehiro on May 10, 1980
- Martin Zabaleta and Pasang Temba on May 14, 1980
- Jerzy Kukuczka and Andrzej Czok on May 19, 1980
- Reinhold Messner on August 20, 1980 (first solo ascent, without supplementary oxygen)
- Eleven Soviet climbers in May 1982
- 1982 Canadian Mount Everest Expedition
  - Laurie Skreslet on October 5, 1982, with Sherpas Sungdare Sherpa and Lhakpa Dorje
  - Pat Morrow on October 7, 1982, with Sherpas Pema Dorje and Lhakpa Tshering
- Yasuo Kato on December 27, 1982 (winter ascent)
- 1983 German/American Expedition (May 1983)
  - Peter Jamieson, Gerald Roach, David Breashears, Ang Rita Sherpa (without supplementary oxygen) and Larry Nielson (without supplementary oxygen)
  - Gary Neptune, Jim States and Lhakpa Dorje Sherpa
- Lou Reichardt, Kim Momb, and Carlos Buhler on October 8, 1983
- Haruichi Kawamura (without supplementary oxygen) and Shomi Suzuki (without supplementary oxygen) on October 8, 1983
- Haruyuki Endo (without supplementary oxygen), Hiroshi Yoshino (without supplementary oxygen) and Hironobu Kamuro (without supplementary oxygen) on October 8, 1983
- Dan Reid, George Lowe and Jay Cassell on October 9, 1983
- Takashi Ozaki in December 1983
- Hristo Prodanov on April 20, 1984
- Metodi Savov and Ivan Valchev on May 8, 1984
- Nikolay Petkov and Kiril Doskov on May 9, 1984
- Bachendri Pal on May 23, 1984
- Tim Macartney-Snape (without supplementary oxygen) and Greg Mortimer (without supplementary oxygen) on October 3, 1984
- Phil Ershler on October 20, 1984
- Zoltán Demján, Jozef Psotka and Sherpa Ang Rita on October 15, 1984
- 1985 Norwegian Expedition led by Arne Naess, in April 1985
  - Chris Bonington
  - Ang Lhakpa Dorje Sherpa
  - Dawa Nuru Sherpa
  - Arne Naess (Arne Næss)
  - Havard Nesheim
  - Sungdare Sherpa
  - Stein Aasheim
  - Ralph Hoibakk
  - Ang Rita Sherpa
  - Pema Dorje Sherpa
  - Chhewang Rinzi Sherpa
  - David Breashears
  - Richard Bass
  - Ang Phurba Sherpa
- 1985 Catalan Expedition: Òscar Cadiach, Antoni Sors and Carles Vallès with Shambu Tamang, Ang Karma and Narayan Shrestha on August 28, 1985
- Erhard Loretan and Jean Troillet in 1986
- Sharon Wood and Dwayne Congdon on May 20, 1986
- Jean-Marc Boivin's 11-12 minute, 2,948 m (9,700 ft) descent to Camp II holds the altitude record for start of a paraglider flight
- Marc Batard in 1988
- A joint team from China, Japan, and Nepal on May 5, 1988
- Stephen Venables on May 12, 1988
- Stacy Allison on September 29, 1988
- Lydia Bradey on 16 October 1988
- Sungdare Sherpa on 10 May 1988
- Stipe Bozic, Viki Groselj, Dimitar Ilievski-Murato, and Sherpas Sonam and Agiva on May 10, 1989
- Ricardo Torres-Nava and Sherpas, Ang Lhakpa and Dorje on May 16, 1989
- Carlos Carsolio on July 18, 1989

== 1990s ==
In the 1990s, 3,017 people set off from Base Camp(s); around 900 reached the summit; 55 died. Overall about 1237 people summited Everest between 1953 and the end of 1999. These are some of the most notable ascents in the 1990s:

- International Peace Climb 1990 summiters in May 1990, led by Jim Whittaker:
  - Robert Link
  - Steve Gall
  - Sergei Arsentiev
  - Grigori Lunyakov
  - Da Cheme
  - Gyal Bu
  - Ed Viesturs
  - Mistislav Gorbenko
  - Andrej Tselishchev
  - Ian Wade
  - Luo Tse
  - Da Qiong
  - Ren Na (aka Rena)
  - Gui Sang
  - Ekaterina Ivanova
  - Anatoli Moshnikov
  - Yervand Ilyinski
  - Aleksandr Tokarev
  - Mark Tucker
  - Wang Ja
  - Warren Thompson
- Hooman Aprin on October 5, 1990
- Marc Batard on October 5, 1990
- Marija and Andrej Štremfelj on October 7, 1990
- Peter Hillary, Gary Ball and Rob Hall in 1990
- Tim Macartney-Snape in 1990
- Kanhaya Lal Pokhriyal in 1992
- Alberto Iñurrategi on 25.09.1992
- Rodrigo Jordan team in 1992
- Mauricio Purto team in 1992
- Cristian Garcia-Huidobro at 10:25 on May 15, 1992
- Doron Erel in 1992
- Santosh Yadav in May 1992
- Mohan Singh Gunjyal on 12 May 1992
- Kushang Sherpa on May 10, 1993
- Santosh Yadav and Dicky Dolma in May 1993
- Veikka Gustafsson in spring 1993
- Pasang Lhamu Sherpa on April 22, 1993
- Nine people led by Steve Bell October 7, 1993
- Steve Bell on October 7, 1993
- Graham Hoyland on October 7, 1993
- Ginette Harrison on October 7, 1993
- Gary Pfisterer on October 7, 1993
- Scott McIvor on October 7, 1993
- Ramón Blanco on October 7, 1993
- Santosh Yadav on May 10, 1993
- Park Young-seok on May 16, 1993
- Ninety commercial alpinists in the spring of 1993
- Alison Hargreaves, May 13, 1995
- Waldemar Niclevitz and Mozart Catão, first Brazilians, 11:22, May 14, 1995
- Jim Litch on May 14, 1995
- Dan Aguilar on May 14, 1995
- Wongchu Sherpa on May 14, 1995
- Apa Sherpa on May 15, 1995
- Brad Bull on May 15, 1995
- Tommy Heinrich on May 15, 1995
- Constantin Lacatusu on 17 May 1995
- Caradog Jones on May 23, 1995
- Pat Falvey on 27 May 1995
- Kiyoshi Furuno and Shigeki Imoto in 1995
- 1996 Mount Everest disaster
- Rob Hall (with Adventure Consultants)
- Scott Fischer (with Mountain Madness)
- Doug Hansen
- Makalu Gau
- Lene Gammelgaard
- Yasuko Namba
- Göran Kropp, May 1996, without extra bottle oxygen
- Ang Rita, May 23, 1996, tenth and last time to summit Mount Everest.
- David Breashears team including Jamling Tenzing Norgay Ed Viesturs Araceli Segarra (see also the 1998 film Everest)
- Sherpa Ang Rita summited ten times between 7 May 1983 and 23 May 1996
- Hans Kammerlander 1996
- Kushang Sherpa on May 17, 1996
- Francys and Sergei Arsentiev on May 24, 1998
- Bear Grylls, Neil Laughton and Alan Silva on May 26, 1998
- Tom Whittaker on May 27, 1998
- Kushang Sherpa on May 28, 1998
- Kazi Sherpa (aka Kaji Sherpa) on October 17, 1998
- Kushang Sherpa on May 28, 1999, until date summited from three sides of Mount Everest
- Sherpa Babu Chiri Sherpa in 1999
- Phurba Tashi Sherpa
- Cathy O'Dowd in 1996 and 1999
- Elsa Ávila on May 5, 1999
- Renata Chlumska on May 5, 1999
- Ken Noguchi on May 13, 1999
- Mike Trueman on May 13, 1999
- Iván Vallejo on May 25, 1999
- [i], Merab Khabazi, and Irakli Ugulava on May 26, 1999
- Lev Sarkisov on May 12, 1999
- Karla S Wheelock on May 27, 1999
- João Garcia, on May 18, 1999
- Fabiano Segatto, on May 18, 1999, at 12:23pm

Everestsummiteersassociation.org/

- Willie Benegas in 1999
- George Dijmarescu on May 26, 1999

== 2000 ==
In total, 146 people summited in 2000. Overall about 1383 people summited Everest between 1953 and the end of 2000. These are some of the most notable ascents in 2000:

- Lhakpa Sherpa 2000
- Nazir Sabir on May 17, 2000
- Frits Vrijlandt on May 17, 2000
- Toshio Yamamoto, summited at age 63
- Babu Chiri Sherpa on May 21, 2000
- Anna Czerwińska on May 22, 2000
- October 7, 2000 summiters included:
  - Davo Karničar (Davorin) on October 7, 2000
  - Franc Oderlap
  - Oliver Scoubes
  - Conner Scoubes
  - Ang Dorje
  - Pasang Tenzing
- On October 9, 2000, a group of three Slovenian climbers were the last of the year and this century to summit
  - Tadej Golob
  - Matej Flis
  - Grega Lačen

== See also ==
- List of Mount Everest records
- List of Mount Everest summiteers by frequency
- List of Mount Everest expeditions
- List of people who died climbing Mount Everest
