= Peter Athans =

American mountain climber (born 1957)

Peter Athans (born March 1, 1957) is one of the world's foremost high-altitude mountaineers. In 2008 he was celebrated for summiting Mount Everest seven times, and was given the moniker "Mr. Everest". His first attempt to climb Everest in 1985 via the West Ridge, and further attempts in 1986, 1987, and 1989 were unsuccessful, but he succeeded in summitting in 1990 as part of an expedition that included Scott Fischer and Wally Berg.

Athans is one of several western Himalayan guides who have adopted Nepal as a second home, and who have taken up the cause of the Sherpa people and their culture.

== Rescues ==
In 1996 he was a key participant in the rescue of several climbers during the May 1996 Everest Disaster. For his efforts the American Alpine Club awarded him and his partner Todd Burleson and Anatoli Boukreev the David A. Sowles Memorial Award.

The next year, Athans removed the body of a friend - Bruce Herrod, a South African climber who had perished just weeks after the 1996 disaster, from the climbing route high up on the mountain. He found Herrod hanging upside down by the climbing ropes that the photographer had been using to make his way down the dangerous Hillary Step section of the mountain, just below the summit. Four expeditions had climbed past his body before the removal of Herrod's body, which was cut loose and pushed over the edge. Athans returned the camera and ice axe of the dead climber to his family. The last pictures Herrod took, shortly after 5PM the night he summitted, were of himself, on the summit, smiling that he had at last reached this goal.

== Everest summits ==
A total of seven Mount Everest summitings:

Everest summitings:

1. May 10, 1990
2. May 8, 1991
3. May 15, 1992
4. May 13, 1994
5. May 23, 1997
6. May 5, 1999
7. May 25, 2002

== See also ==
- List of climbers
- List of Mount Everest summiters by number of times to the summit
- Dave Hahn
- William Crouse
- Ed Viesturs
- George Dijmarescu
- Beck Weathers
