= List of Mount Everest summiteers by frequency =

This list consists of people who have reached the summit of Mount Everest more than once. By 2013, 6,871 summits had been recorded by 4,042 people. By the end of 2016 there were 7,646 summits by 4,469 people. In 2018 about 800 people summited, breaking the record for most in one year compared to 2013, in which 667 summited Mount Everest.

As of December 2024, there have been approximately 12,884 summit ascents by 7269 people.

Information in this list may be outdated; it can take months or years for summit counts to be reliably confirmed. Confirmations can also be made difficult by many sherpas having similar names.

== List ==
Count	Climber	Nationality	Ref.	Year and place of death
32	Kami Rita Sherpa	Nepal		
31	Pasang Dawa Sherpa	Nepal		
25	Ang Dorje Sherpa (Chhuldim)	Nepal		
24 (Note: The Himalayan Database gave Ngima Nuru Sherpa 20 ascents until 2019 (22 adding those of 2022 that are not yet registered).)	Ngima Nuru Sherpa	Nepal		
24	Dorje Gyalgen (Dorji Gyaljen also Dorje Gyalzen) Sherpa	Nepal		
21	Apa Sherpa	Nepal		
21	Phurba Tashi Sherpa	Nepal		
21	Pemba Dorje Sherpa	Nepal		
20	Kenton Cool	United Kingdom		
19	Chhewang Nima (Chuwang)	Nepal		2010 on Baruntse
19	Mingma Tsiri Sherpa	Nepal		
19	Phurba Onggel Sherpa	Nepal		2026 on Makalu
17	Lakpa Rita Sherpa	Nepal		
17	Panuru Sherpa	Nepal		
16	Chhiring Dorje Sherpa	Nepal		
16	Nima Gombu Sherpa	Nepal		
16	Garrett Madison	United States		
15	Kili Pemba Sherpa	Nepal		2026 on Broad Peak
15	Dave Hahn	United States		
15	Kame Sherpa	Nepal		
14	Long Dorje Sherpa	Nepal		
13	Ang Passang Sherpa	Nepal		
13	Mingma Dorjee Sherpa (Thame)	Nepal		
13	Fura Kancha Sherpa	Nepal		
13	Guillermo "Willie" Benegas	United States né Argentina		
12	Alexander V. Abramov	Russia		
12	Siddhi Bahadur Tamang	Nepal		
11	Chongba Nuru Sherpa	Nepal		2017 in Tate
11	Hiroyuki Kuraoka	Japan		
11	Pemchirri Sherpa	Nepal		
11	Lhakpa Sherpa ♀	Nepal		
10	Dawa Nuru Sherpa	Nepal		
10	Tashi Tshering	Nepal		
10	Ang Rita Sherpa	Nepal		2020 in Kathmandu
10	Babu Chiri Sherpa	Nepal		2001 on Everest
10	Karsang Namgyal Sherpa	Nepal		2012 on Everest
10	Namgyal Sherpa	Nepal		2013 Everest
10	Phil Crampton	United Kingdom		
10	Vernon Tejas	United States		
10	Noel Hanna	United Kingdom (Northern Ireland)		2023 on Annapurna
10	Mark Woodward	New Zealand		
10	Pur Bahadur (Yukta) Gurung	Nepal		2026 on Broad Peak
9	Nirmal Purja	Nepal; United Kingdom		2026 on Broad Peak
9	Mingma Tenjing Sherpa	Nepal		
9	Nima Gyalzen Sherpa	Nepal		
9	Dorje Khatri Sherpa	Nepal		2014 Everest
9	Tenjing Dorji	Nepal		
9	David Hamilton	United Kingdom		
9	Mike Roberts	New Zealand		
9	Dean Staples	New Zealand		
9	George Dijmarescu	United States		
9	Ang Namgel Sherpa	Nepal		
9	Ryan Waters	United States		
8	Adrian Ballinger	United Kingdom		
8	Ngawang Rapke Sherpa	Nepal		
8	Mingma Gelu Sherpa	Nepal		
8	Tashi Lakpa Sherpa	Nepal		
8	Tenzing Sherpa	Nepal		
8	Rob Casserley	United Kingdom		
7	Ngima Tashi Sherpa	Nepal		2025 on Annapurna
7	Love Raj Singh Dharmshaktu	India		
7	Daniel Mazur	United States		
7	Dawa Tashi Sherpa	Nepal		
7	Ed Viesturs	United States		
7	Jamling Bhote	Nepal		
7	Jyamchang Bhote	Nepal		
7	Tshering Pande Bhote	Nepal		
7	Karma Rita Sherpa	Nepal		
7	Lakpa Thundu Sherpa	Nepal		
7	Mingma (David) Gyabu Sherpa	Nepal		
7	Lakpa Sherpa	Nepal		
7	Norbu Sherpa	Nepal		
7	Noriyuki Muraguchi	Japan		
7	Peter Athans	United States		
7	Scott Woolums	United States		
7	David Liaño Gonzalez	Mexico		
7	Tim Mosedale	United Kingdom		
6	Phanden Sherpa	Nepal		
6	Ang Karma Sherpa	Nepal		
6	Ben Jones	United States		
6	David Morton	United States		
6	Jamie McGuinness	New Zealand		
6	Justin Merle	United States		
6	Kami Sherpa	Nepal		
6	Kondo Kenji	Japan		
6	Luis Benitez	United States		
6	Lydia Bradey ♀	New Zealand		
6	Mark Whetu	New Zealand		
6	Melissa Arnot ♀	United States		
6	Mingma Gyalje Sherpa	Nepal		
6	Phunuru Sherpa	Nepal		
6	Thendu Dorje Sherpa	Nepal		2014 Everest
6	Victor Saunders	United Kingdom		
5	Anshu Jamsenpa ♀	India		
5	David Breashears	United States		
5	David Tait	United Kingdom		
5	Duncan Chessell	Australia		
5	Guy Cotter	New Zealand		
5	Kari Kobler	Switzerland		
5	Karna Tamang	Nepal		
5	Kushang Sherpa (Kusang Dorjee)	India		
5	Lila Bahadur Basnet	Nepal		
5	Michael Brown	United States		
5	Michael Hamill	United States		
5	Pasang Karma Sherpa	Nepal		2014 Everest
5	Rob Hall	New Zealand		1996 Everest
5	Ryszard Pawłowski	Poland		
5	Sonam Tshering Sherpa	Nepal		1993 Everest
5	Sungdare Sherpa	Nepal		1989
5	Elia Saikaly	Canada		
5	Valentyn Sypavin	Ukraine		
4	Rima Rinje Sherpa	Nepal		2025 Annapurna
4	Anatoli Boukreev	Kazakhstan		1997 Annapurna
4	Ang Kaji Sherpa	Nepal		2014 Everest
4	Dr. Jon Kedrowski	United States		
4	Dawa Gyaljen Sherpa	Nepal		
4	Eugeny Vinogradski	Russia		
4	Jose Luis Peralvo	Ecuador		
4	Lopsang Jangbu Sherpa	Nepal		1996 (Sept.) Everest
4	Michael Horst	United States		
4	Paul Giorgio	United States		
4	Phura Geljen Sherpa	Nepal		
4	Shinji Tamura	Japan		
4	Simone Moro	Italy		
4	Wally Berg	United States		
4	Yuri Contreras	Mexico		
4	Wang Jing ♀	China		
4	Gabriel Filippi	Canada		
7	Dave Watson	United States		
4	Kristin Harila ♀	Norway		
3	Rodrigo Jordan	Chile		
3	Andy Lapkass	United States		
3	Ang Phurba Sherpa	Nepal		
3	Brent Bishop	United States		
3	Casey Grom	United States		
3	Conrad Anker	United States		
3	Chhang Dawa Sherpa	Nepal		
3	Ryan Nusic	Canada		
3	Héctor Ponce de Leon	Mexico		
3	Huang Nubo	China		
3	Jake Norton	United States		
3	Kazuya Hiraide	Japan		2024 K2
3	Kevin Farebrother	Australia		
3	Khoo Swee Chiow	Singapore		
3	Lyudmila Korobeshko ♀	Russia		
3	Noboru Yamada	Japan		1989 Denali
3	Pasang Sherpa	Nepal		
3	Pertemba Sherpa	Nepal		
3	Ranvir Singh Jamwal	India		
3	Robert Schauer	Austria		
3	Robert Slozen	United States		
3	Ryuseki Hiraoka	Japan		
3	Tashi Tenzing	Nepal		
3	Saurabh Singh Shekhawat	India		
3	Jagat Singh Negi	India		
3	Rajendra Singh Jalal	India		
3	Serap Jangbu Sherpa	Nepal		
3	Sergei Bershov	Ukraine		
3	Neal Beidleman	United States		
3	Seth Waterfall	United States		
3	Ed Wardle	United Kingdom		
3	Stuart Peacock	United Kingdom		
3	Um Hong-gil	South Korea		
3	Veikka Gustafsson	Finland		
3	Walter Laserer	Austria		
3	Yasuo Kato	Japan		1982 Everest
3	Yuichiro Miura	Japan		
3	Rodrigo Raineri	Brazil		
3	Valérie Boffy ♀	France		
3	Rodrigo Jordan	Chile		
3	Joshua T. McDowell	United States		
2	Anish Luitel	Nepal		
2	Emil Neszmélyi	Hungary		
2	Abele Blanc	Italy		
2	Adele Pennington ♀	United Kingdom		
2	Adolphus Hancock	Canada		
2	Ajay Kothiyal	India		
2	Alex Lowe	United States		1999 Shishapangma
2	Alexei Bolotov	Russia		2013 Nuptse
2	Amar Prakash Dogra	India		
2	Andrej Štremfelj	Slovenia		
2	Andrew Lock	Australia		
2	Ang Phu Sherpa (b.1950)	Nepal		1979 Everest
2	Anita Kobold ♀	Germany		
2	Asmus Norreslet	Denmark		
2	Augusto Ortega	Peru		
2	Azim Gheychisaz	Iran		
2	Bill Burke	United States		
2	Bull Bradford	United States		
2	Carlos Hatuka	United States		
2	Cathy O'Dowd ♀	South Africa		
2	Cering Doje	China		
2	Claudio Bastrentaz	Italy		
2	Chhurim ♀	Nepal		
2	Chiang Hsiu-chen ♀	Taiwan (Taiwan)		
2	Christine Boskoff ♀	United States		2006 M. Genyen
2	Cory Richards	United States		
2	David Hempleman-Adams	United Kingdom		
2	David Rodney	Canada		
2	David Roeske	United States		
2	Deepika Rathore ♀	India		
2	Didier Delsalle	France		
2	Ellen Miller ♀	United States		
2	Fyodor Konyukhov	Russia		
2	Gary Francis	Australia		2014
2	Gary Ball	New Zealand		1993 Dhaulagiri
2	Graham Ratcliffe	United Kingdom		
2	Greg Wilson	United States		
2	Göran Kropp	Sweden		2002
2	Axel Duhart	Mexico		
2	Igor Svergun	Ukraine		2013 Nanga Parbat
2	Ivan Vallejo	Ecuador		
2	Jamie Clarke	Canada		
2	Jeff Rhoads	United States		
2	Jimmy Chin	United States		
2	John Furneaux	Canada		
2	John Tsang Chi-sing	Hong Kong		
2	Juan Pablo Ruiz	Colombia		
2	Kílian Jornet Burgada	Spain		
2	Karim Mella	Dominican Republic		
2	Koichi Oyama	Japan		
2	Laura Gonzalez del Castillo ♀	Mexico		
2	Leif Whittaker	United States		
2	Ludovic Challeat	France		2012 Manaslu
2	Lynne Hanna ♀	United Kingdom		
2	Muhammad Abdul Mohit	Bangladesh		
2	Manuel Pizarro	Canada		
2	Marco Siffredi	France		2002 Everest
2	Margaret Watroba ♀	Australia		
2	Marty Schmidt	New Zealand		2013 K2
2	Michael Groom	Australia		
2	Michael Niemeier	Germany		
2	Michael Smith	United Kingdom		
2	Mike Kobold	Germany		
2	Michihiro Kadoya	Japan		
2	Mollie Hughes ♀	United Kingdom		
2	Muneo Nukita	Japan		
2	Namgyal Tshering Sherpa	Nepal		2012 Everest
2	Naoki Ishikawa	Japan		
2	Nawang Gombu	Nepal		2011
2	Òscar Cadiach	Spain		
2	Park Young-seok	South Korea		2011 Annapurna
2	Pat Falvey	Ireland		
2	Paul Noble	United Kingdom		
2	Sherpani Pemba Doma ♀	Nepal		2007 Lhotse
2	Peter Hillary	New Zealand		
2	Phil Ershler	United States		
2	Reinhold Messner	Italy		
2	Robert Anderson	New Zealand		
2	Russell Brice	New Zealand		
2	Santosh Yadav ♀	India		
2	Scott Fischer	United States		1996 on Everest
2	Sean Disney	South Africa		
2	Shaun Hutson	United Kingdom		
2	Sibusiso Vilane	Swaziland		
2	Silvio Mondinelli	Italy		
2	Shuji Nazuka	Japan		2004 Annapurna
2	Stipe Božić	Croatia		
2	Susmita Maskey ♀	Nepal		
2	Takashi Ozaki	Japan		2011 Everest
2	Takeshi Yamamura	Japan		
2	Tamae Watanabe ♀	Japan		
2	Tenzing Nuru Sherpa	Nepal		2007 Everest
2	Teruo Saegusa	Japan		1989 Denali
2	Tunç Fındık	Turkey		
2	Tim Macartney-Snape	Australia		
2	Tore Sunde-Rasmussen	Norway		
2	Unnikannan A. P. Veetil	India	,	
2	Usukhbayar Golovdorj	Mongolia		
2	Vladimir Bashkirov	Russia		2007 Lhotse
2	Vitor Negrete	Brazil		2006 Everest
2	Waldemar Niclevicz	Brazil		
2	Karina Oliani ♀	Brazil		
2	Wang Shi	China		
2	Khimlal Gautam	Nepal		
2	Yoshinobu Kato	Japan		
2	Ravindra Kumar	India		
2	Michael Neal	United States		
2	Luis Stitzinger	Germany		2023 Kangchenjunga
2	Zeb Blais	United States		
2	Tao Liu	Italy		2026
2	Nikolay Petkov	Bulgaria		
2	Atanas Skatov	Bulgaria		2021 K2
2	Uta Ibrahimi	Kosovo		

== Verification issues ==
Cases of possible confusion over names, sources, or unclear references

	Achiever	Nation	Ref.	Died / lost
14-16	Danuru Sherpa	Nepal		
12	Pem Chirri	Nepal		
15	Lhakpa Gelu Sherpa	Nepal		
15	Ningma Tsheri Sherpa	Nepal		
13	Nga Temba Sherpa	Nepal		
3	Lakpa Tsheri Sherpa	Nepal		

Adventure Consultants report on summits and people by 2016:

- Da Jangbu Sherpa, Nepal, 13 summits
- Pemba Chhoti Sherpa, Nepal, 11 summit
- Kami Rita Sherpa, Nepal, 14 summits
- Purba Chhoter Sherpa (Ang Jangbu), 8 summits
- Chhewang Dorji Sherpa, Nepal, 9 summits
- Chhiring (Tsering) Namgel Sherpa, Nepal, 4 summits
- Da Thuk Bhote, Nepal, 3 summits
- Passang Bhote, 7 summits
- Nima Tsering, Nepal, 6 summits

It can be hard to determine who is who sometimes, as there are some similar names. For example in 2013 two different Kami Rita Sherpa high-altitude workers summited with different guide firms. Nepal may not issue summit certificates to Nepali who don't buy a permit. One problem firms must contend with is summit fraud attempts.

== See also ==
- List of Mount Everest records
- List of 20th-century summiters of Mount Everest
- List of people who died climbing Mount Everest
