= Jürg Marmet =

Swiss mountaineer (1927–2013)

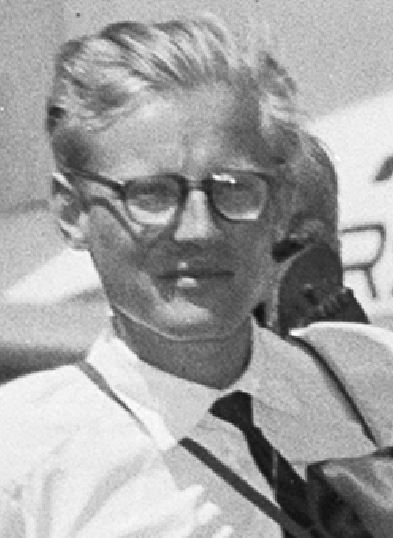
Jürg Marmet 1956

Jürg Marmet (14 September 1927 – 8 March 2013) was a Swiss mountaineer. Marmet was part of the first two-man Swiss team which climbed Mount Everest in 1956. (Prior to this, only Sir Edmund Hillary and Tenzing Norgay had successfully climbed the mountain in 1953). Marmet and his climbing partner, Ernst Schmied, became the third and fourth people (and the second two-man team) to reach Mount Everest's summit on 23 May 1956. He was also one of the first Swiss citizens to climb to the top of Mount Everest. Marmet and Schmied narrowly beat the next Swiss team to the top: The next day, the next two-man Swiss expedition of Hansruedi von Gunten and Dölf Reist reached the top of the mountain on 24 May 1956. Marmet and Schmied were also the first Swiss to ascend Lhotse in 1956.

Marmet was born in Bern, Switzerland, on 14 September 1927. He married Elsbeth Knoerr and had three children. He was a chemical engineer by profession and retired in 1992.

Jürg Marmet died in Allschwil, Switzerland, on 8 March 2013, at the age of 85.

== See also ==
- List of 20th-century summiters of Mount Everest
