= Abele Blanc =

Italian mountaineer (born 1954)

Personal information
- Nationality: Italian
- Born: 2 September 1954 (age 71) Aosta, Italy
- Occupation: Mountaineer

Climbing career
- Known for: 22nd person to climb the 14 eight-thousanders

Abele Blanc (born 2 September 1954) is an Italian mountaineer and mountain guide. In 2011, he became the 22nd person to climb all fourteen eight-thousanders, which he did between 1992 and 2011.

Abele Blanc summited Mount Everest twice, first in 1992 and once more in 2010. The second summit was done without using supplemental oxygen.

== Biography ==
Originally from Aymavilles, where he lives, he began his experience in the snow as a competitive Cross-country skiing (sport), coming close to the national team. After also achieving good results in Ski mountaineering and Skyrunning(with the record of climbing and descending from the summit of Gran Paradiso in 2 h 28' 25), he became one of the most internationally known Italian mountaineers. He is a Mountain guide, Nordic skiing instructor, national ski mountaineering instructor, of the mountain guides and regional mountain rescue instructor.

He has all 14 peaks above eight thousand meters to his credit (Everest twice, the first time in 1992 with supplemental oxygen, the second time in 2010 without). He climbed Kangchenjunga from Camp 3 to the summit with the use of supplemental oxygen.

He also made several solo ascents and winter firsts on the Italian four-thousand-meter peaks.

== See also ==
- List of Mount Everest summiters by number of times to the summit
- List of 20th-century summiters of Mount Everest
- Christian Kuntner, Blanc's frequent climbing partner
