= Kanhaya Lal Pokhriyal =

Indian police officer and mountaineer (born 1949)

- Born: 10 January 1949 (age 77); Sachkhil, Pauri Garhwal district, Uttarakhand, India
- Occupations: Police official Mountaineer
- Known for: Everest and Kanchen Junga summiting
- Awards: Padma Shri

Kanhaya Lal Pokhriyal (born 10 January 1949) is an Indian police official and mountaineer, known for climbing the highest peak in the world, Mount Everest in 1992. He was born on 10 January 1949 in the small village of Sachkhil in the Pauri Garhwal district of the Indian state of Uttarakhand and has served the Indo-Tibetan Border Police. He is the only Indian mountaineer to have climbed Kanchenjunga through two routes, from Sikkim and Nepal.

== Awards ==
- Received Padma Shri award by The Government of India in 2003.

== See also ==
- List of 20th century summiters of Mount Everest
- Indian summiters of Mount Everest - Year wise
- List of Mount Everest summiters by number of times to the summit
- List of Mount Everest records of India
