= Benegas =

Benegas may refer to:

- Domingo Benegas (born 1946), Paraguayan footballer
- Ismael Benegas (born 1987), Paraguayan footballer
- José María Benegas (1948–2015), Spanish politician
- Albino Jara Benegas (1877–1912), provisional President of Paraguay
- Perris Benegas (born 1995), American BMX cyclist
- Treaty of Benegas, a peace treaty during the Argentine Civil War
- Willie Benegas, American mountaineer
