= Shambu Tamang =

Nepalese mountaineer (1955–2022)

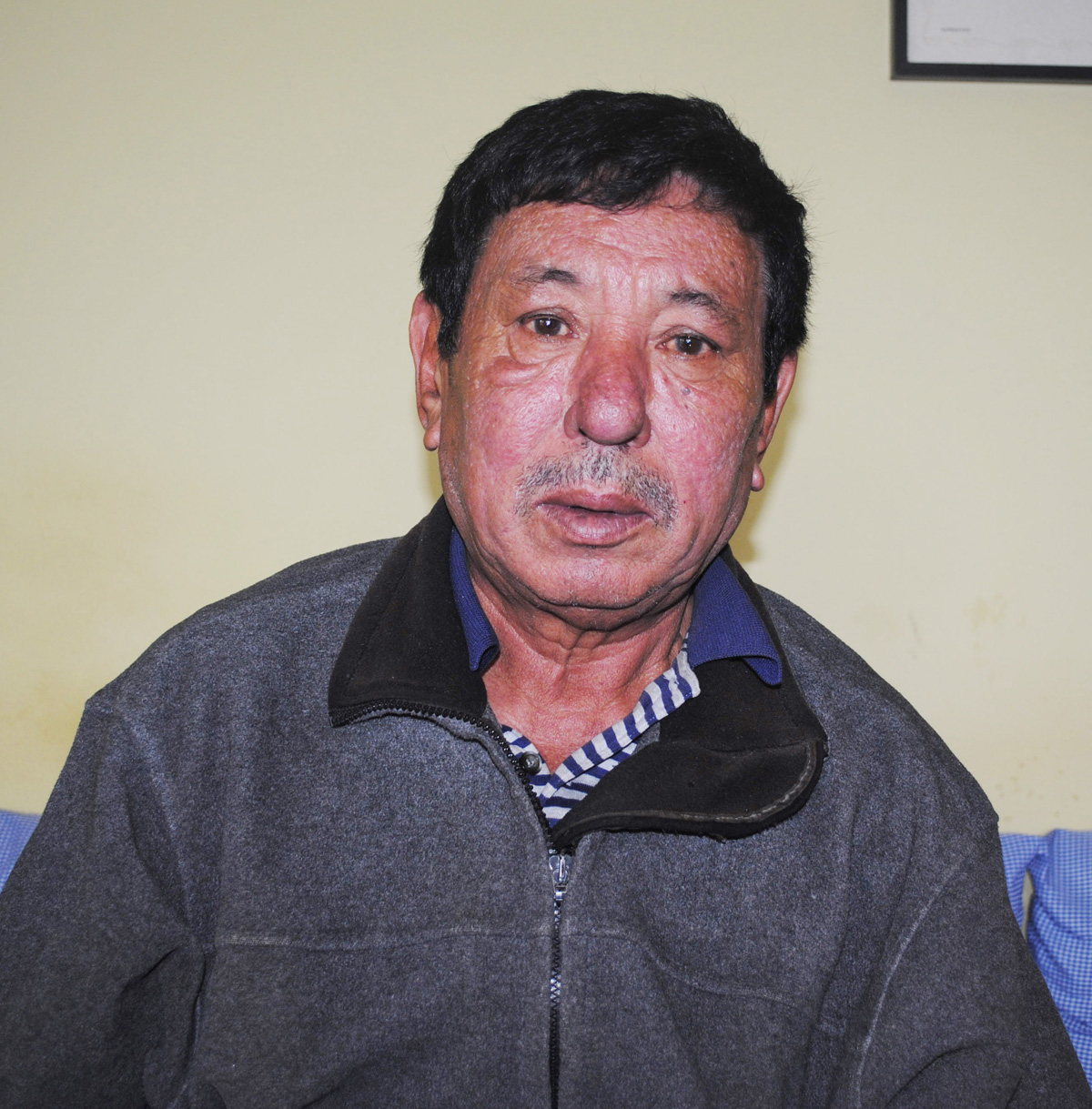

Personal information
- Full name: Shambu Tamang
- Nationality: Nepalese
- Born: 20 October 1955 Nepal
- Died: 7 July 2022 (aged 66) Lalitpur, Nepal

Climbing career
- Major ascents: The youngest person to climb Mount Everest at the age of 17 years 6 months 15 days on 1973 May 5.

Shambu "Shambhu" Tamang (Nepali: शम्भू तामाङ; 20 October 1955 – 7 July 2022) was a Nepalese mountaineer who once held the record as the youngest person to successfully climb Mount Everest, reaching the summit on May 5, 1973. There were discrepancies in previous records regarding his exact age at the time of the climb; while most sources claimed he was 16, it is now believed he was 17 years old. Tamang's record was surpassed in May 2001 by Temba Tsheri.

Tamang, who had since repeated his ascent of the summit from northern side, owned a trekking company in Kathmandu.

== See also ==
- List of 20th-century summiters of Mount Everest
- List of Mount Everest records
