= Hansruedi von Gunten =

Swiss chemist and mountaineer (1928–2021)

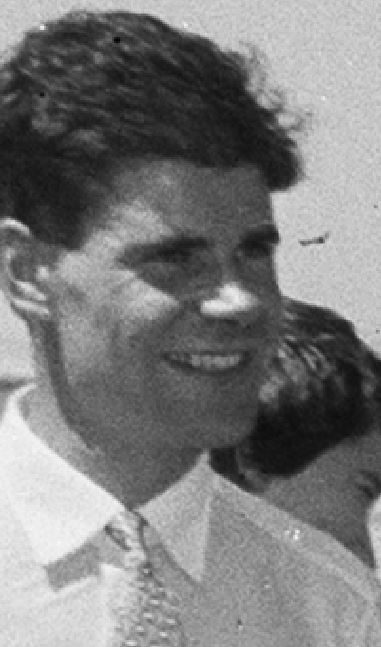
Hansruedi von Gunten, 1956

Hansruedi von Gunten (12 December 1928 in Bern – 7 December 2021) was a Swiss chemist and mountaineer. Together with Dolf Reist he succeeded on May 24, 1956, the third ascent of Mount Everest.

== Early years and life ==
Gunten graduated in Bern, the Municipal Gymnasium (Matura 1948), studied at the University of Bern chemistry (major), physics and geology (minor subjects), doctored from 1954 to 1956 at the Physical Institute at FG Houtermans on age determinations of Congolese minerals and radioactive bleach (Cotunnites) from Mount Vesuvius. He refused a call to the Johannes Gutenberg University in Mainz. From 1970 until his retirement in 1993, he was a full professor of radiochemistry. He supervised numerous diploma and doctoral students.

Gunten spent two sabbaticals at the Argonne National Laboratory near Chicago, USA (1957 and 1966) and one each at the Lawrence Berkeley Laboratory in Berkeley, California USA (1980) and in Sydney, Australia (1990).

These activities have resulted in more than 150 publications in renowned journals.

From Gunten has numerous peaks in the Alps on z. T. difficult routes (including the north wall of the Aiguille du plan) defeated. He participated in a geological research expedition in East Greenland in 1953 (first ascent of the Shackletons-Bjerg, together with John Haller and Wolfgang Diehl on 2 August). He climbed in Mexico, Ecuador, New Zealand and Japan volcanoes.

== 1956 Swiss Mount Everest Expedition ==
In 1956 von Gunten became a member of the Swiss Mount Everest-Lhotse expedition, where he was responsible for the food and catering. On April 6, 1956 he succeeded in the Khumbu area together with the Sherpas Lobsang and Gyalsen the first ascent of today often visited Island Peak. Von Gunten reached the summit of Mount Everest together with the photographer Dölf Reist as the second team of this expedition, one day after the ascent by Jürg Marmet and Ernst Schmied. He spent two hours on the summit, including one hour without extra oxygen.

He was a member of the Swiss Alpine Club SAC and an honorary member of the Academic Alpine Club Bern AACB.

== Weblink ==
- H. W. Gäggeler: Pro memoria Hans Rudolf (Hansruedi) von Gunten. (12.12.1928 – 7.12.2021). In: European Chemical Society, 2021 (PDF).
