= Nepal Mountain Academy =

Mountaineering, mountain science and adventure tourism college in Kathmandu, Nepal

Address
- Thapagaun, Bijulibazar; Kathmandu; Nepal
- Coordinates: 27°41′33.47″N 85°19′47.54″E

Information
- Founded: 2002
- Affiliation: Ministry of Culture, Tourism and Civil Aviation (Nepal); Government of Nepal
- Website: nma.gov.np

Nepal Mountain Academy (NMA) is a Nepalese government-owned mountaineering school. It functions under the Ministry of Culture, Tourism and Civil Aviation (Nepal).

== History ==
The school was opened in 2002. Since 2017–2018, the academic courses offered are associated with Tribhuvan University's Faculty of Management. Field training and climbing activities are conducted at Solukhumbu campus.

=== List of expeditions ===
- 2021, a 18-members team consisting of NMA-run first batch of Bachelor of Mountaineering Studies (BMS) climbed Mera Peak - (6,470 m (21,230 ft). In their final semesters, students must climb 6,000-7,000 metre peaks to complete their undergraduate program.

== See also ==
- Nepal Mountaineering Association
