= Sungdare Sherpa =

Nepalese mountaineer (1956–1989)

Sungdare Sherpa (Nepali: सुन्दरे शेर्पा) (1956 Thame village, Solukhumbu – 1989 Pangboche) was a Nepalese Sherpa guide for climbers of Mount Everest. He summited Mount Everest five times, and was the first person to summit Mount Everest three times.

== Climbing career ==
Sungdare was with Ray Genet and Hannelore Schmatz when they died on an October 1979 expedition. He remained with them when they were exhausted, and as a result, lost most of his fingers and toes to frostbite.

Despite losing his digits, Sungdare summited Mount Everest four more times after the 1979 expedition.

== Death ==
Sungdare drowned in a river below his village, Pangboche, Nepal in 1989.

Elizabeth Hawley stated that he struggled with alcoholism and that his death was a suicide. He was survived by his widow, Bhingfuti.

As quoted in an article in Backpacker magazine talking about Mount Everest:

The Summit is always different. Sometimes it is one side and sometimes the other. It changes every time.

— Sungdare Sherpa, 1986

== Ascents of Everest ==
1. 1979
2. 1981 October summiting
3. 1982 October summiting
4. 1985
5. 1988

== See also ==
- List of Mount Everest summiteers by frequency
- List of Mount Everest guides
- List of 20th-century summiteers of Mount Everest
