= Andrew Lock =

Australian mountaineer (born 1961)

Personal information
- Nationality: Australian
- Born: 26 December 1961 (age 64)
- Website: andrew-lock.com

Climbing career
- Type of climber: Mountaineer
- Known for: First Australian to climb all 14 eight-thousanders (13 without oxygen)

Andrew James Lock OAM (born 26 December 1961) is an Australian mountaineer. He became the first, and still remains the only, Australian to climb all 14 "eight-thousanders" (the peaks over 8,000-metres above sea level) on 2 October 2009, and is the 18th person to ever complete this feat. He climbed 13 of the 14 without bottled oxygen, only using it on Mount Everest, which he has summited three times. He retired from eight-thousander climbing in 2012.

== Climbing ==
His preferred climbing style is in very small teams, mostly climbing without even sherpa support, and without using bottled oxygen (except on Everest). His physical ability to perform at high altitude has been noted by other Himalayan climbers. The term "gritty" is often used to describe Lock, and he is noted for his understated and self-deprecating manner. Unusually for a long-standing high-altitude climber, Lock has lost no digits to frostbite. Climbing all 14 eight-thousanders, and surviving, is an rare feat as the deaths-to-summits ratio on some of the mountains is at one-in-five (including Annapurna, K2, Nanga Parbat, Kangchenjunga), and it often takes more than one attempt, on average, to climb an eight-thousander (Lock has an overall eight-thousander success rate of circa 50%).

"Some people are driven by the desire for unusual bragging rights. Others seek to prove to themselves what kind of stuff they are made of. Still others – and I suspect Lock may fit in this category – get tremendous satisfaction from coping well with a huge challenge".

— Elizabeth Hawley, "Himalayan Database"

He has achieved six first Australian ascents of eight-thousanders, namely Dhaulagiri, Nanga Parbat, Hidden Peak, Manaslu, Annapurna, and Shishapangma. He has made four solo ascents of eight-thousanders, namely Lhotse, Broad Peak, Shishapangma Central and Cho Oyu. He summited Mount Everest twice.

His first 8,000-metre summit was of K2, which he climbed in 1993 with a small team that included legendary Himalayan climber Anatoli Boukreev, who later died in 1997 on Annapurna. The "Savage Mountain" lived up to its fearsome reputation when three of his summit partners were killed in separate falls (on the same face), and Lock rescued a Swedish climber.

In 2004, he was a climber and cinematographer for the acclaimed Discovery Channel six-part miniseries, Discovery Channel-Ultimate Survival: Everest, which has been broadcast many times in North America. On that expedition, Lock had to rescue three members of other teams coming down from the summit, giving up his own oxygen along the way.

Lock has climbed with several leading high-altitude Himalayan mountaineers, including Anatoli Boukreev (K2 in 1993), Göran Kropp (Broad Peak in 1994), Doug Scott and Wojciech Kurtyka (Nanga Parbat Mazeno Ridge in 1995), and Iván Vallejo & Iñaki Ochoa de Olza (Annapurna 2007). After Ecuadorian Iván Vallejo, Lock is the second, and still the only other, Southern Hemisphere climber to complete all 14 eight-thousanders.

While Lock has climbed with partners that he did not particularly enjoy, or get on with, his unhappy experience when climbing with U.K. mountaineer Alan Hinkes (who was the first Briton to have climbed all 14 eight-thousanders), on Nanga Parbat in 1998, is recounted in his book, Summit 8000.

In May 2011, Lock attempted Everest for the third time, but his first without supplementary oxygen (to complete the rarer Reinhold Messner feat of climbing all 14 eight-thousanders without oxygen). His solo climb of Everest's North Ridge was unsuccessful due to high winds and blizzard conditions. Lock made a second attempt to summit Everest solo, via the North side, without supplementary oxygen in May 2012, but abandoned the climb 300 metres from the summit due to self diagnosed early symptoms of Cerebral Oedema. [This was incorrectly reported as High altitude pulmonary oedema].

Lock retired from personal high-altitude climbing after his 2012 Everest experience, however, a final "oxygenless" ascent of Everest (his third Everest ascent), remains a potential project. He continues to guide commercial expeditions to Mt Everest and other peaks in the Himalaya and around the world, specialising in small teams with high logistical support.

== Personal ==
In 2009 Lock was awarded the Australian Geographic Society's Adventurer of the Year award. On 13 June 2011, Lock was awarded the Medal of the Order of Australia for service to mountaineering.

Lock is an ambassador of the Sir David Martin Foundation.

Lock is the author of SUMMIT 8000 which was published in Australia and New Zealand in 2014, and MASTER OF THIN AIR, which was published in the United States of America in 2015. Both books relate to his journey to climb the fourteen 8000-metre peaks.

== 8,000-metre summits ==
- 1993 K2 (8,611 metres) – first Australian ascent through Pakistan
- 1997 Dhaulagiri (8,167 metres) – first Australian ascent
- 1997 Broad Peak (8,048 metres) – solo ascent
- 1998 Nanga Parbat (8,125 metres) – first Australian ascent
- 1999 Hidden Peak (8,068 metres) – first Australian ascent
- 1999 Gasherbrum II (8,035 metres) – Alpine-style ascent
- 2000 Mount Everest (8,848 metres) – first Australian to lead a commercial expedition to the summit of Mt. Everest
- 2002 Manaslu (8,163 metres) – first Australian ascent
- 2002 Lhotse (8,516 metres) – solo ascent
- 2003 Shishapangma Central (8,008 metres) – solo ascent
- 2004 Everest (8,848 metres) – second personal ascent; Discovery Channel expedition climber and cameraman
- 2004 Cho Oyu (8,201 metres) – solo ascent
- 2005 Cho Oyu (8,201 metres) – second personal ascent; commercial expedition leader
- 2005 Shishapangma Central (8008 metres) – second personal ascent; commercial expedition leader
- 2006 Kangchenjunga (8,596 metres) – second Australian ascent
- 2007 Annapurna (8,091 metres) – first Australian ascent
- 2008 Makalu (8,496 metres)
- 2009 Shishapangma Main Summit (8,027 metres) – first Australian ascent

== See also ==
- List of Mount Everest summiters by number of times to the summit

== Filmography ==
- Discovery Channel (2004). Ultimate Survival: Everest (6 Part TV Mini-Series).

== Bibliography ==
- Andrew, Lock (2014). Summit 8000: Life and Death with Australia's Greatest Mountaineer. Melbourne University Press. ISBN 978-0522861921.
