= Òscar Cadiach =

Spanish mountain climber

Òscar Cadiach i Puig (born 1952 in Barcelona) is a Spanish mountaineer. He has climbed all the 14 eight-thousanders.

== Life ==
Cadiach grew up in Tarragona. At age 14 he became interested in mountain climbing and by 22 he was working as an instructor at the Escola Catalana d’Alta Muntanya (‚Catalan high mountains school‘).

In the 1980s he started to climb the eight-thousanders with the Nanga Parbat being the first summit to be reached in 1984. In 1985 he climbed Mount Everest, where Cadiach managed to climb the technically difficult Second Step unaided for the first time. In 2013 he climbed his 13th eight-thousander, the Gasherbrum I.

Besides he also traveled to America and Africa. He also worked as a photographer and took part in several documentary productions. In the documentary Al Filo de lo Imposible he took the role of George Mallory. For the Catalan TV program El Cim at TV3 he led six rather inexperienced young climbers to the summit of Aconcagua in 2003.

== Climbing of eight-thousanders ==
Cadiach has climbed the eight-thousanders in the following order:

1. Nanga Parbat (8126 m) on 07.08.1984
2. Mount Everest (8848 m) on 28.08.1985, second climb on 17.05.1993
3. Shishapangma (8027 m) on 04.10.1993
4. Cho Oyu (8201 m) on 29.09.1996, second climb on 04.05.1997
5. Makalu (8462 m) on 19.05.1998
6. Gasherbrum II (8035 m) on 07.07.1999
7. Lhotse (8516 m) on 23.05.2001
8. Manaslu (8163 m) on 04.10.2011
9. Annapurna (8091 m) on 06.05.2012
10. Dhaulagiri (8167 m) on 25.05.2012
11. K2 (8611 m) on 31.07.2012
12. Kangchenjunga (8586 m) on 20.05.2013
13. Gasherbrum I (8068 m) on 29.07.2013
14. Broad Peak (8047 m) on 27.07.2017

== See also ==
- List of 20th-century summiters of Mount Everest
- List of Mount Everest summiters by number of times to the summit
