= David Liaño Gonzalez =

Mexican mountain climber (born 1979)

David Liaño González
- Born: Mexico City, Mexico
- Other names: David Liano
- Occupations: Mountaineering, sailing, paragliding
- Known for: First mountaineer to climb Mount Everest from both the Nepal and Tibet sides in one climbing season

David Liaño González (born December 19, 1979) is the first mountaineer to double summit on Mount Everest from both the Nepal and Tibet sides, which he has climbed seven times so far. He has also climbed the Seven Summits.

Liaño Gonzalez has also lived in Seattle, Washington in the United States where he is also known as David Liano. When he brought a fan flag of the Seattle Seahawks American football team to the summit of Everest in 2016, it made news stories across that country.

== Early life ==
David Liaño González was born in Mexico City, Mexico. His career began with climbing the Mexican volcanoes and in 2003 he began to participate in international expeditions with Club Alpino Mexicano, mostly to Bolivia where he summitted Tarija Peak (5,060m), Pequeño Alpamayo (5,300m), Condoriri (5,648m) and Huayna Potosí (6,088m). He is married to Prarthana Purushothaman, and lives in Seattle.

== Seven Summits ==
Liaño González completed the Seven Summits on August 18, 2006, taking 2 years and 195 days to complete the project:

Mountain	Altitude	Location	Summit Date
Aconcagua	6,960 m	South America	January 4, 2004
Mount McKinley	6,194 m	North America	June 21, 2004
Kilimanjaro	5,895 m	Africa	January 30, 2005
Mount Kosciuszko	2,228 m	Australia	March 22, 2005
Everest	8,848 m	Asia	May 30, 2005
Mount Elbrus	5,642 m	Europe	August 3, 2005
Vinson Massif	4,892 m	Antarctica	January 19, 2006
Carstensz Pyramid	4,884 m	Oceania	July 18, 2006

== Climbing Mount Everest ==
Liaño González climbed Mount Everest on May 11, 2013 from the south side in Nepal. Returning to Kathmandu on May 13, he was again atop Everest on May 19, this time from the north side.

Liaño Gonzalez summited in 2016 achieving his sixth summiting of Everest.

== See also ==
- List of Mount Everest summiters by number of times to the summit
