= Pertemba =

Nepalese mountain climber and trekking leader

Pertemba (born 15 February 1948), also known as Pertemba Sherpa, is a professional Nepalese mountaineer, trek leader and businessman. He reached the summit of Mount Everest by the Southwest Face during the first successful expedition on that route in 1975.

== Biography ==
Pertemba was born in 1948 in Khumjung, Solukhumbu where his father farmed with about forty yaks. At the age of five, he was sent to live with his grandparents near Cho Oyo in the Gokyo valley. Later, he was cared for by his aunts living near Tengboche Monastery. He studied with the monks there at the age of eight, he became very ill and almost died. In 1961, he started his education at a school founded by Edmund Hillary. He studied there for five years but failed to secure a scholarship to continue his education. In 1966, he got a job in the kitchen at Lukla Airport. His knowledge of English helped him move to Kathmandu, where he joined the first trekking agency in Nepal, Jimmy Roberts' Mountain Travel. He initially worked as a high-altitude porter on several expeditions before becoming a Sherpa leader or sirdar.

Pertemba donated his family's ancestral house in Khumjung for it to become the Sherpa Heritage House museum, the last traditional house in Solu Khumbu. He is the vice chairman of the Himalayan Trust and a founding member of the Kathmandu Environmental Education Project. pertemba has been an executive member of the Himalayan Rescue Association and the Nepal Mountaineering Association. He has been awarded the Order of Gorkha Dakshina Bahu (first class) by the King of Nepal. Chris Bonington has described him as being assured and dynamic. Pertemba is married and has children.

== Mountaineering and trekking ==
Pertemba participated as a climber in Chris Bonington's 1970 Annapurna and 1975 Everest Southwest Face expeditions, serving (as sirdar in the latter). Bonington said he frequently consulted Pertemba, sometimes to the irritation of the lead climbers, valuing the sirdar's opinion on the capabilities of the Sherpas and the best routes to follow. In 1979, Pertemba was the expedition co-leader on the American first ascent of Gauri Sankar. He has climbed Mount Everest three times, although he stopped climbing in 1995 while continuing to lead climbing and trekking expeditions.

In 1985, with two business partners, he established a trekking agency called Nepal Himal. Pertemba has given climbing seminars in the United States and Europe and has also climbed in Switzerland, Alaska, and Britain.

== See also ==
- List of Mount Everest summiters by number of times to the summit
- List of 20th-century summiters of Mount Everest
