= Takashi Ozaki =

Japanese mountaineer

Takashi Ozaki (尾崎隆, Ozaki Takashi; September 9, 1952 – May 12, 2011) was a Japanese mountaineer. He is known for having made the first ascent of Mount Everest's north face and the first ascent of Myanmar's Hkakabo Razi.

== Biography ==
Ozaki was born in Kameyama in Japan's Mie Prefecture.

On May 10, 1980, Ozaki, with Tsuneo Shigehiro, made the first full ascent of the north face of Mount Everest. Later, in 1983, he made a December ascent of Everest.

In 1996, Ozaki made the first ascent of Myanmar's remote Hkakabo Razi with Myanmar climber Niyma Gyaltsen.

Ozaki died while descending Everest's south side at around 8,600 meters. He had to abort his ascent when he developed medical problems, then died during his attempt to summit Mount Everest on May 12, 2011.

== Personal life ==
Takashi Ozaki was married to Frederique Gely-Ozaki, who also climbed mountains with him. He had two children, daughter Sara and son Makato Ozaki.

== Notable ascents ==
Summits:

- Everest (twice: 1980 and 1983)
- Broad Peak
- Manaslu
- Lhotse
- Kangchenjunga
- Makalu
- Dhaulagiri
- Island Peak
- Hkakabo Razi

== See also ==
- List of people who died climbing Mount Everest
- List of Mount Everest summiters by number of times to the summit
- List of 20th-century summiters of Mount Everest
