= Rodrigo Jordan =

Chilean businessman (born 1959)

Rodrigo Jordán Fuchs (born June 30, 1959 in Santiago, Chile) is a Chilean business man, a university professor, social entrepreneur and mountaineer. He is a founder and president of Vertical S.A., Leadership Professor in Pontifical Catholic University of Chile’s MBA (MBA-UC) and Faculty member of Executive Education at the Wharton School of Business of the University of Pennsylvania. Since 2018, he is also president of the Comunidad de Organizaciones Solidarias. Considered an accomplished mountaineer, he led the first South-American expedition to summit Everest in 1992. He repeated the ascent in 2012 and 2016 by different routes, making him the only person to have summited Mount Everest on each of its faces. He has also been in many expeditions on mountains around the world and has authored a series of books and documentary films that recount these adventures.

== Family and Studies ==
His father was Ricardo Jordán, and his mother was Sonia Fuchs, the renowned executive director of the fiction department of Televisión Nacional de Chile (Chile’s National TV channel). Both passed away in an aircraft accident in 1991. He has two brothers: Ricardo and Pablo. He attended San Gaspar School and The Grange School, both in Santiago, where he graduated in 1976, after earning the “Best Student of the Class” distinction and the “García Oldini Cup” for the best student in mathematics and physics.

In 1983, he graduated as an Industrial Engineer from Pontifical Catholic University of Chile, where he received the distinction “Roberto Ovalle Aguirre” for the best engineer thesis awarded by the Chilean Engineers Institute. He also graduated from Oxford University, United Kingdom, where he earned his PhD for his thesis on Innovation and Urban Poverty.

He has three daughters: Sofia, Natalia and Elisa.

== Professional career ==
Back in Chile after finishing his PhD in the United Kingdom, he was Director of the Directorate of Distance Education (Dirección de Educación a Distancia) of Pontifical Catholic University of Chile –TELEDUC- between 1990 and 1994. He also worked as Executive Secretary of the President's Advisory Council of the Republic of Chile for Sport and Recreation (Consejo Asesor del Presidente de la República de Chile para el Deporte y la Recreación).

=== Business man ===
In 1994, he created Vertical S.A., a company focused on the formation of excellence teams, and Vertical Foundation (Fundación Vertical), that develops educational programs and leadership trainee, social skills and organizational development to institutions, companies and marginal social sectors.

Between 1998 and 2000, he was Executive Director of the TV Corporation of the Catholic University of Chile (Canal 13). Rodrigo Jordán is often invited to give seminars and courses of leadership and development of high performance teams among different countries, working actively with several corporations, universities and nonprofit organizations to develop their leadership qualities.

In 2010, he undertook a new challenge, the creation of Vertical Professional Institute, (Instituto Profesional Vertical) an educational organization that trains and forms nature professionals through the careers of Tourism in the Nature and Adventure Sports.

=== Professor ===
He has been a professor in the Engineering School of Pontificia Universidad Católica de Chile. He is currently teacher in Leadership for the Masters in Business Administration Program of Pontificia Universidad Católica de Chile (MBA-UC) and participates in various programs of the Center for Directorial Development of the same University (CDD-UC).

Since 2008, he is a professor in Executive Education at Wharton School of Business in the University of Pennsylvania.

=== Social Entrepreneur ===
Because of his doctoral thesis and his presidency of Fundación Vertical, he was invited to participate in the National Foundation for Overcoming Poverty (Fundación Nacional para la Superación de la Pobreza) in Chile as director in June 2004. Its mission is to contribute to overcoming poverty by promoting greater levels of equity and social integration in the country to ensure the sustainable human development of people who live today in poverty and social exclusion. The year after that he assumed as President of the Foundation, and served as its president for 10 years. In 2018, he remained as one of its directors.

Between 2012 and 2018, he was president of America Solidaria International.

Since June 2018, he is President of the Comunidad De Organizaciones Solidarias in Chile. In 2013, he was appointed by President Sebastián Piñera to preside the Commission for the Measurement of Poverty, that transformed the way poverty was measured in Chile, changing it from a measurement based on income to using the concept of multidimensional poverty.

He is also a panelist on the radio show Siempre es Hoy of Tele13 radio, hosted by journalists Carolina Urrejola y Pablo Aranzaes.

== Mountaineering and expeditions ==
Parallel to his academic formation, Jordán has developed a sports career that began with rugby union, which he practiced during his schooling becoming part of the national youth team. When he was a university student, he began his career as mountain climber, by taking courses and climbing high mountains in Chile, Argentina, Alaska, Peru and Bolivia. From the beginning he stood out in this activity and gained the distinction for the “Best Athlete in Climbing”, awarded by the Sports Journalists Circle of Chile.

In addition to developing his PhD thesis in Oxford, he specialized as a mountain instructor at the National School for Outdoor Activities of Great Britain.

He was awarded the Irvine Travel Award, given by Oxford University to the best expedition of the year, for his expedition to Mount Kenya and Mount Kilimanjaro, in Africa.

On May 15, 1992, he led the first South American group who reached the peak of Mount Everest (8,848 m / 29,029 ft), the highest mountain in the world. This experience was vital on his professional development, since the idea of creating Vertical S.A. was born there. The route they took was on the east face, known as the Kangshung face – that given its extreme difficulty, it has only been climbed 4 times as of 2018.

In 1996, he led another successful Chilean expedition, this time to K2, in the Karakoram range. This was the first integral ascent of the South-SouthEast ridge.

Between November 2002 and January 2003, he led a scientific-sporting expedition to Antárctica. During 54 days and without any external support, they covered 400 kilometers of unexplored mountain terrain, and collected valuable ice and rock samples for scientific research on Antarctica. Also in 2003, he made possible the first educational expedition for the MBA program of the Wharton School to Patagonia.

Later, in May 2004, he led his fourth expedition to Everest guiding it by the Khumbu Glacier route and placing nine climbers on the peak. Among the members of that team was Andrónico Luksic Craig, one of the owners of the Luksic group, a leading business conglomerate in Latin America.

In May 2006, he conducted another successful expedition to the fourth highest mountain in the world, Lhotse (8,516 m / 27,940 ft) He placed eleven climbers on the peak and aimed to celebrate the contribution of Professor Claudio Lucero to the development of mountaineering and outdoor education in Chile.

In January 2008, he participated in the National Geographic Society and the New York's Explorer Club expedition to Antarctica. During six weeks, they explored on kayaks the west part of the Antarctic Peninsula to record and evaluate the effects of climate change in that continent. That same year, he led an expedition that included kayak and hiking to Greenland, also meant to record the effects of climate change on the north ice.

In May 2012, to celebrate the 20 years of the first South-American ascent to Everest, he led an expedition with young climbers on the normal route through Nepal. This would be his second time on the summit of Everest. This time, the expedition successfully took 18 climbers to the summit.

The following year, in February, he reembarked on the yacht Pelagic Australis for a month long international expedition of Antarctic mountain climbing, led by Stephen Venables and Skip Novak. He climbed Mount Scott and Mount Agamemnon.

In September 2014, again under the command of Stephen Venables and Skip Novak, he went on an expedition to South Georgia Islands, where he made the first ascent to the three summits of the Trident, discovered by Ernest Shackleton 98 years before. The American Alpine Journal published an article of that expedition the following year.

In 2016, he led a sixth expedition to Everest, this time on the north face, through Tibet. On this opportunity, he accomplished his third Everest ascent, and became the only person to have climbed the three faces of Everest.

== Distinctions ==
Throughout his entire career, he has received many awards and distinctions.

In 1995, Time named him one of the leaders of the next millennium. He has been a member of the Royal Geographical Society of the United Kingdom, and vice president of the International Union of Alpinist Associations (UIAA). For his work giving back to the community in a creative and significant manner, he was selected as an “Endeavor Entrepreneur” in the United States.

Between 2000 and 2008, he was invited by the Rolex Awards for Enterprise as a member of the jury to award the Rolex Prize for Spirit of Enterprise.

In September 2004, he was honored by the Ministry of Education of the Chilean Government with the Orden al Mérito Docente y Cultural Gabriela Mistral with a knighthood – distinction that is awarded to national or foreign people that have made a great service to benefit education, culture and the praising of the service of teaching.

In 2008, he was honored by the Center of Geographical Education Gilbert Grosvenor of the Texas State University with the Gilbert M. Grosvenor (president of the Director's board of National Geographic) medal. This was the first time this award, given to whom stand out for their contributions to the education of geography, was given to a non-American citizen.

The Asociación Nacional de Avisadores awarded him the ANDA prize 2010, in recognition of his important contributions to the development of communications.

== Books ==
- Everest. El desafío de un sueño (2002)
- K2. El máximo desafío
- Planeta Antártica
- Lhotse. La montaña de los vientos
- Antártica/Groenlandia, expediciones al corazón del cambio climático
- Un día en Chile
- Liderazgo Real de los fundamentos a la práctica
- Horizonte Vertical

== Documentaries ==
- Everest 1986: The Loss of a Friend
- Denali 1982: The mountain of the Arctic
- Everest 1992: The challenge of a dream
- K2 1996: The mountain of mountains
- África 1997: Closer to the Sky
- Antártica 2002: Planet Antartica
- Everest 2004: Dreams and reality
- Lhotse 2006: Lucero, the passion of a master
- Antártica 2008: Terra Antártica, rediscovering the seventh continent
- Groenlandia 2008: Expedition to the heart of climate change
- Everest 2012: The New Generation
- Everest 2012: Our motives

== See also ==
- List of Mount Everest summiters by number of times to the summit
- List of 20th-century summiters of Mount Everest
