= Christian Kuntner =

Italian mountaineer

- Born: January 15, 1962; Prad, Italy
- Died: May 18, 2005 (aged 43); Annapurna, Nepal

Christian Kuntner (January 15, 1962 – May 18, 2005) was an Italian extreme climber. He died in May 2005 while climbing the Annapurna from North Side.

== Life ==
He was born in Prad, Italy and grew up there. He completed his schooling at Bolzano with a major in Mechanical Engineering and started working as a freelancer.

In 1991, he summitted his first eight-thousander, Cho Oyo, alongside Wanda Rutkiewicz. In 1994, he summitted Dhaulagiri.

“I climb for myself, not for anyone else. I don’t have anything to prove.”

— Christian Kuntner

In 1998, he cycled the 10,000 km route of the Silk Road. The next year, in 1999, he connected with a new climbing partner, Abele Blanc and together they would summit many of the world's highest peaks together.

In 2001 he cycled the entire length of the American continent, from Alaska in the north to Tierra del Fuego in Argentina over nine months. Later that year, he summitted Nanga Parbat alongside Abele Blanc and Stefan Andres on June 30, 2001.

In 2002, he made his second attempt at Annapurna, but was unsuccessful. Instead, he and Abele Blanc went to climb 64 of the 84 peaks in the Alps. The next year, he and Abele Blanc made another attempt via the south route, but had to abandon their summit attempt.

On May 15, 2004, Kuntner reached the summit of Lhotse via the normal route. It was his thirteenth eight-thousander summitted without supplementary oxygen. He had one more summit to complete the list of 14 eight-thousand meter peaks. If successful, he would have been the sixth person in history to have climbed all eight-thousanders.

== Death ==
While making his fourth attempt at the summit of Annapurna, he was hit by falling seracs while climbing from camp 2. An emergency medical doctor was climbing on the mountain that day and rushed to the scene. He suffered internal bleeding, and his injuries were fatal. Kuntner died on May 18, 2005.
