= Wally Berg =

American mountain climber (born 1955)

Wally Berg (born 1955) is a mountaineer from the United States. He was the first American to summit Lhotse in 1990, and he soloed Cho Oyu in 1987. He has summited Mount Everest four times.

Berg now operates Berg Adventures International, an adventure travel company based in Canmore, Alberta, Canada. Berg Adventures offers guided mountaineering trips to the Seven Summits, and many other destinations including Tanzania, Galapagos, Ecuador, Nepal, and Kazakhstan. Since 1992 he has guided more than 50 Continental summits.

Berg was born in Lebanon, Missouri, and lived in Hattiesburg, Mississippi, from 1965 to 1974. He was active in the Boy Scouts of America. His interest in climbing developed during his days on the staff of Philmont Scout Ranch near Cimarron, New Mexico in the 1970s.

== See also ==
- List of Mount Everest guides
- List of Mount Everest summiters by number of times to the summit
