= Dave Hahn =

American mountaineer (born 1961)

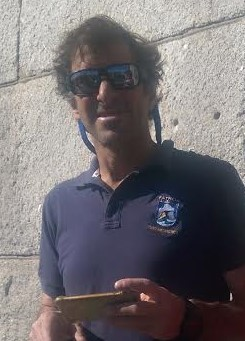
- Dave Hahn, October, 2016
- Born: November 3, 1961 (age 64); Okinawa, Japan
- Education: State University of New York at Buffalo
- Occupations: mountaineer, mountain guide, ski patroller, journalist

David Allen Hahn (born November 3, 1961) is an American mountaineer, ski patroller and journalist. In May 2013, he reached the summit of Mount Everest for the 15th time—at the time, this was the most summits for a non-Sherpa climber, according to Outside Magazine contributor and climber Alan Arnette. His record was surpassed by Kenton Cool in 2022. Among Hahn’s other notable accomplishments are his 39 summits of Vinson Massif, Antarctica’s highest mountain. He has reached the summit of Denali in Alaska, North America’s highest peak, 25 times over the course of 37 expeditions.

== Biography ==
Hahn graduated with a Bachelor of Arts degree in history from the State University of New York at Buffalo in 1984. In 2014, he was inducted into The State University of New York at Buffalo Sports Hall of Fame.

Hahn specializes in guiding high, glaciated mountains, In 1999, he led the team that discovered the remains of celebrated English climber George Mallory at 26,760 ft (8,156 m) on Mount Everest's North Face. Mallory died on the mountain in 1924, along with fellow climber Andrew Irvine, but it has never been determined whether or not he first reached the top.

Hahn is a member of Eddie Bauer's "First Ascent" climbing team. He is currently sponsored for ski equipment by Salomon and for climbing equipment by Whittaker Mountaineering, a climbing store in Ashford, Washington.

Numerous organizations use Hahn as a guide including Rainier Mountaineering (for which he has worked since 1986), and Fathom Expeditions. Hahn is a regular guide on Mount Rainier in Washington with more than 300 ascents, as well as a professional ski patroller at Taos Ski Valley in New Mexico where he has been employed since 1985. He has twice guided climbers to the summit of Cho Oyu, the sixth-highest mountain in the world, which borders Nepal and Tibet. Hahn has also guided former New Mexico governor Gary Johnson to the summits of Vinson and Mount Everest.

Hahn has also made a specialty of guiding the "Shackleton Crossing" on South Georgia, the island in Antarctic waters that figured prominently in the Endurance saga of 1914-16., a trip that earned the designation as Trip of the Year from Outside magazine in 2004.

Hahn has written for Outside magazine and has been a correspondent for several websites, including MountainZone.com, the RMI blog and Eddie Bauer's Live Your Adventure blog. He has contributed to several books about Mount Everest and the search for George Mallory and Andrew Irvine.

== Awards and honors ==
- 2001, Hahn was selected as the Denali Pro Mountaineer of the Year, by the National Park Service for rescues performed on Mount McKinley.
- 2002: Received the David A Sowles Award for Unselfish Valor, given by the American Alpine Club in recognition of rescues performed high on the Tibetan flank of Mount Everest in May 2001.
- 2008, Hahn was honored by the Nepal Mountaineering Association for the 2007 rescue of a climber in distress above 27,000 feet on Everest's South Side.
- 2008 ESPY Award nominee for Best Outdoor Athlete.
- 2009: Citizen's Award for Bravery from the U.S. Department of the Interior. Awarded for a rescue Hahn made of an injured climber on Mount Rainier in 2002. The rescue received additional attention because the helicopter that Hahn was in crashed upon descent. Hahn helped evacuate the pilot before making his way to the injured climber.

== Everest summits ==
1. 1994
2. 1999
3. 2000
4. 2003
5. 2004
6. 2005
7. 2006 (spring)
8. 2006 (fall/autumn)
9. 2007
10. 2008
11. 2009
12. 2010
13. 2011
14. 2012
15. 2013

== See also ==
- List of Mount Everest summiters by number of times to the summit
- List of Mount Everest guides
