= Phil Crampton =

British mountaineer

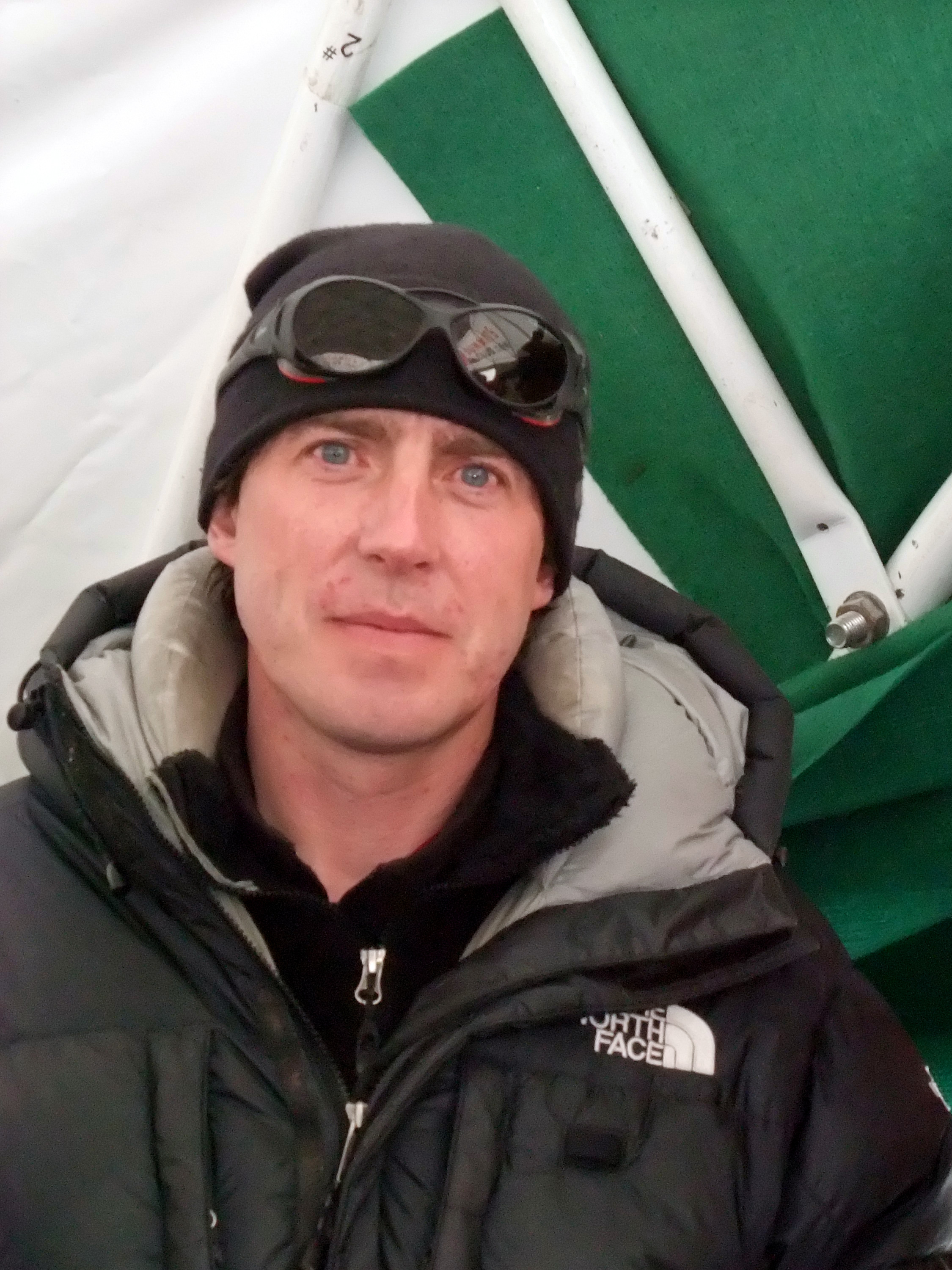
- Phil Crampton at Everest Base Camp in Tibet, May 2012
- Born: Nottingham, United Kingdom
- Occupations: Mountaineer, Expedition Leader

Philip James Crampton, commonly known as Phil Crampton, is a British born mountaineer and expedition leader, and owner of the mountaineering company Altitude Junkies.

== Mountaineering ==
Crampton's climbing achievements include successful ascents of Everest (10 times), Cho Oyu (twice) and Manaslu (4 times). He has led more than 40 expeditions to 8,000m peaks.

Crampton was born in the United Kingdom, but moved to the United States in his early 20s. He took up climbing and became an instructor. Initially he guided in North America, but later he started guiding in the Himalayas. He was an expedition leader with the mountaineering operators SummitClimb and Mountain Madness before setting up his own company, Altitude Junkies, in 2002.

With Jon Otto he helped to set up the Tibet Mountaineering Guide School in Lhasa to train native Tibetans in the skills needed to guide mountaineering expeditions, and he taught there for many years.

== Rescues on Everest ==
Crampton was involved in the rescue of the Australian mountaineer Lincoln Hall, who was found alive high up on Everest's Northeast Ridge in 2006 after spending a night above 8,500 metres (27,887 ft). Hall had been left for dead and his death reported in the Australian press before he was found by members of the SummitClimb expedition team the following morning. Crampton's precise role in the incident remains unclear. Previously in the expedition Crampton had aborted his attempt at 8,610 metres (28,248 ft) at the Second Step to bring down a teammate, Juan Pablo, who had been struck down with cerebral edema, and of his own rescue Hall described him as "the unsung hero of that morning". In 2010 he assisted in the rescue of a commercial client Mike Herbert after he became ill with high-altitude cerebral edema (HACE) at 8,700 metres (28,543 ft) on Everest's Southeast Ridge.

== Personal life ==
Crampton was born in Nottingham, England, and when not on expedition divides his time between Kathmandu and Woodstock, New York, both of which he calls home. He is married to an American, Trish Crampton. He is proud of his Nottingham heritage, and describes his heroes as the mountaineer Doug Scott, the fashion designer Paul Smith, and the former Nottingham Forest football manager Brian Clough, all of whom had roots there.

== See also ==
- List of Mount Everest summiters by number of times to the summit
