= Narayan Shrestha =

Radio and television personality from Nepal

Narayan Shrestha (Nepali: नारायण श्रेष्ठ ) is a radio and television personality from Nepal, known for hosting the talk show BBC Sajha Sawal.
