= Neal Beidleman =

American mountaineer and guide

- Born: 1960 (age 65–66); Grand Junction, Colorado
- Education: University of Colorado, engineering
- Occupations: Mountaineer, speaker, engineer
- Known for: Surviving the 1996 Mount Everest disaster, five successful summits of eight-thousanders
- Spouse: Amy Beidleman

Neal Jay Beidleman is an American mountaineer known for surviving the 1996 Mount Everest disaster. After the disaster, his explorations were profiled on the U.S. news programs Nightline and Frontline, in which his decisions and patience were credited for likely saving the lives of himself and several other less-experienced climbers. Beidleman has reached the summit of eight-thousanders five times, including Mount Everest three times, and Makalu and Cho Oyu one time each.

== Background ==
Beidleman grew up in Colorado, as the son of a ski lodge operator and resort planner. At age 5, the Beidleman family moved to Aspen, where Neal "grew up on skis" and went on to learn to mountain climb and would guide tours for children during the summer.

He participated in ski races while attending University of Colorado and earning a degree in engineering. After university he moved to California to work as an engineer, but the death of his younger brother encouraged him to live every day at its fullest. It was then he headed to the Himalayas.

On May 15, 1994, the 39th anniversary of the first summit of Makalu, Beidleman and Anatoli Boukreev summitted the mountain. Anatoli had planned a record speed ascent, but gave up that idea after realizing his tent in camp III was destroyed by strong wind. It was on this trip that Beidleman became engaged to his wife Amy.

=== 1996 Everest disaster ===
Beidleman was working as a guide for his friend Scott Fischer on the 1996 Mountain Madness Everest expedition. He successfully summitted Everest for the first time on the trip. After he reached the summit, a strong storm moved in, setting off a series of events that caused the deaths of Fischer and seven others. The survival of some of Everest's climbers that day has been directly attributed to Beidleman's efforts to guide clients to safety.

==== Boukreev's use of supplemental oxygen ====
Anatoli Boukreev and Beidleman were effectively the lead guides for Mountain Madness when things went bad on Everest because expedition leader Scott Fischer was not around to consult or help.

One disputed issue around the 1996 Everest disaster was Anatoli Boukreev's choice not to use oxygen. Beidleman discussed this at length in a 2020 interview, offering his most extensive on-record explanation of the issue. According to Beidleman, Boukreev brought a bottle of oxygen and a regulator up the mountain but chose not to use them, handing the bottle to Beidleman at the Balcony (approximately 27,500 ft). Beidleman recalled Boukreev saying he had "no need," a decision that diverged from the original plan for the team's guides to use oxygen while assisting clients. Beidleman stated that Boukreev "was told to" use supplemental oxygen by Scott Fischer.

Beidleman contextualized Boukreev's refusal within his background in the Soviet climbing tradition, where oxygen-less ascents were considered a purer or more elite expression of mountaineering. He described Boukreev's choice as partially rooted in pride, but also in long-standing cultural and philosophical views about ascent style. Beidleman emphasized that this perspective was not uncommon among high-altitude climbers from the former USSR and reflected a broader ethos about climbing without artificial assistance.

However, Beidleman highlighted the tension between this philosophy and the responsibilities of a commercial guide. He noted that while climbing without oxygen allowed Boukreev to move quickly and reach the summit early, it limited his ability to remain at the top and to assist clients who were still ascending. Climbing without supplemental oxygen reduced Boukreev's mental clarity, cold tolerance, and decision-making capacity at extreme altitude, making it difficult for him to stay with the team during a critical period on summit day.

Beidleman's account states that expedition leader Scott Fischer expected Boukreev to use oxygen and was relying on him to function in a more conventional guiding role. Although Beidleman acknowledged Boukreev's exceptional strength and skill, he stated that Boukreev "failed to appreciate" that on a commercial expedition he was not climbing solely for himself but as part of a guided team with clients who depended on him. Beidleman stopped short of attributing blame for the disaster, but his comments clarify long-debated aspects of Boukreev's oxygen use and its implications for team dynamics and safety during the 1996 tragedy.

==== Assessment of team competence and risk dynamics ====
When asked about Rob Hall's well-known worry—Hall said he expected "something bad to happen" that season—Beidleman confirmed the concern. Many teams on the mountain, he says, were under-qualified and under-prepared. There were inexperienced commercial clients and untested teams whose presence added uncertainty. Beidleman makes a subtle but important point: the climber you worry about isn't the total novice, because they get weeded out early. The dangerous client is the one with just enough strength and competence to get into serious trouble high on the mountain. These people can push too far without the skills to retreat or survive a crisis. This dynamic, he suggests, contributed heavily to the disaster.

Beidleman stated he and Fischer thought many teams would "get spit out the back" before reaching dangerous altitudes. But because so many groups pushed upward late into the season, and because the weather initially seemed stable, people who normally would have turned back did not. This created a traffic jam at the worst possible heights—and set the stage for catastrophe. He discussed the tension that impacted the overall situation between wanting clients to succeed and recognizing that some were not truly ready. Guides, he suggests, can develop emotional investment in clients that isn't always strategically wise at high altitude.

=== After Everest ===
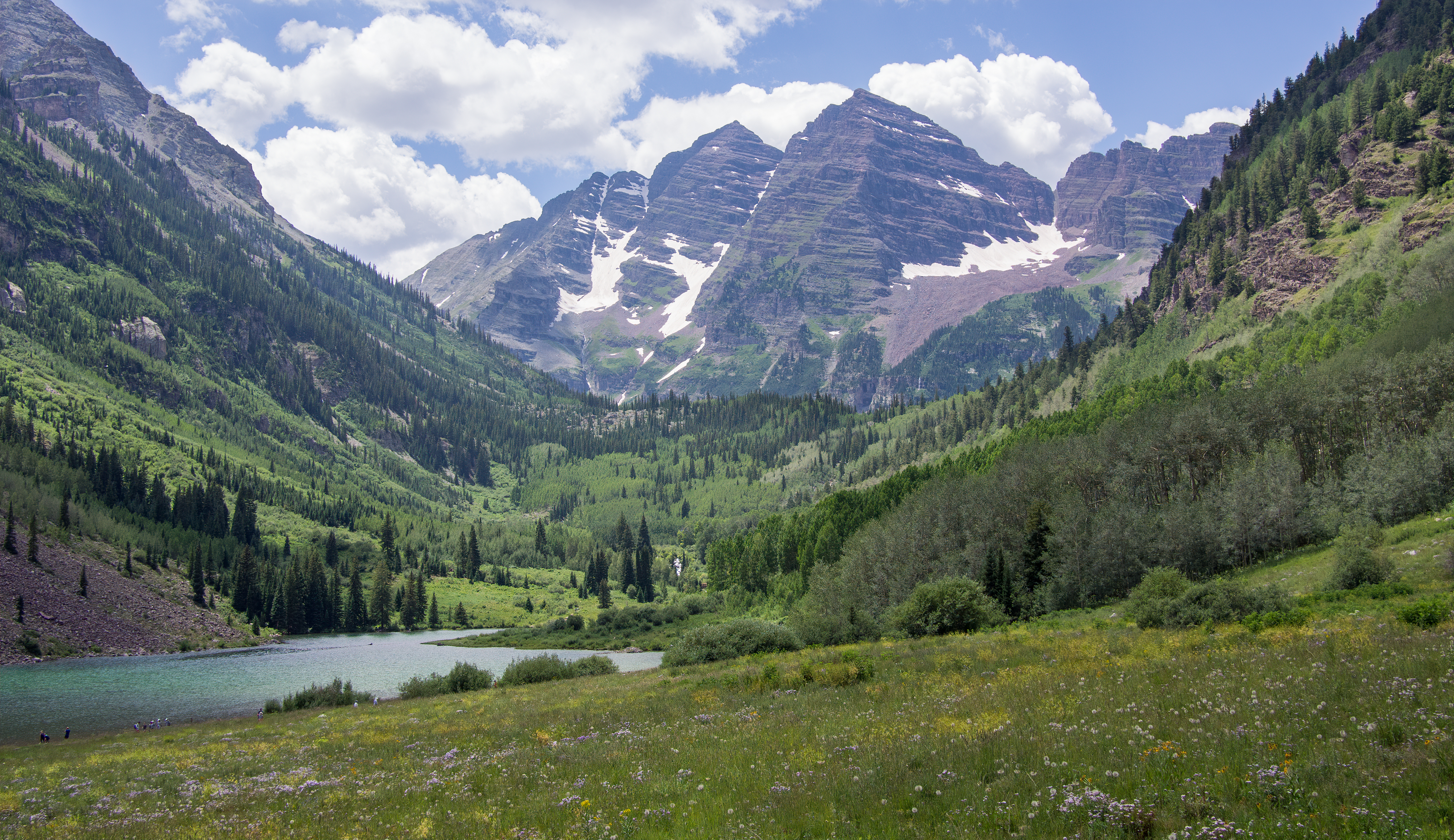
Aspen, Colorado, where Beidleman has continued climbing since returning from the Himalayas.

Prior to the disaster, Beidleman planned to pursue a career as a professional mountaineer. Afterwards, he said the 1996 trip changed him in inexplicable ways. At home in Aspen, he continued his work as a mechanical engineer, building various products for the aerospace and outdoor recreation industries, including devices to protect people in avalanches, ski boot heaters, shovels to bike pedals. Since returning from Everest, he has conducted numerous public talks on his experiences in that disaster, especially in regard to decision-making and team management.

He remained close to the mountains, continuing to climb and ski across the Rockies. Shortly after returning from Everest, he and friend Jeff Hollenbaugh made a 34 hour traverse of Western Colorado's Elk Mountains to Pyramid Peak. In 2006, he published Aspen Ski and Snowboard Guide, a trail guidebook to the towns' local ski areas. When his son Finn was 13, the two summited Mt. Kilimanjaro together.

He would not return to Nepal until 2000, with an attempt at Annapurna, but called the expedition off at 5900m due to avalanche risk. After the unsuccessful summit, it would be more than a decade before he returned to the Himalayas.

In 2011, he felt ready to tackle Everest again, and summitted via the S Col-SE Ridge on May 20. The return, and successful summit after many years was an attempt to find closure for the events that happened in 1996. While acclimatizing for Everest, he and Chris Davenport made a 2,000 ft ski descent of Everest's Lhotse Face.

In 2013, he summited Ama Dablam (6,814m).

In 2014, he again returned to Everest, but the team abandoned the attempt shortly after arriving at basecamp due to the 2014 Everest Avalanche.

In 2018, he summited Cho Oyu (8,188m) via the NW route with Adrian Ballinger's Lightning Ascent team. After two days rest, the team headed to Mount Everest, where Beidleman summitted the earth's highest peak once more, seven years to the day from his last summit.

== See also ==
- List of Mount Everest guides
