= Lydia Bradey =

New Zealand mountaineer

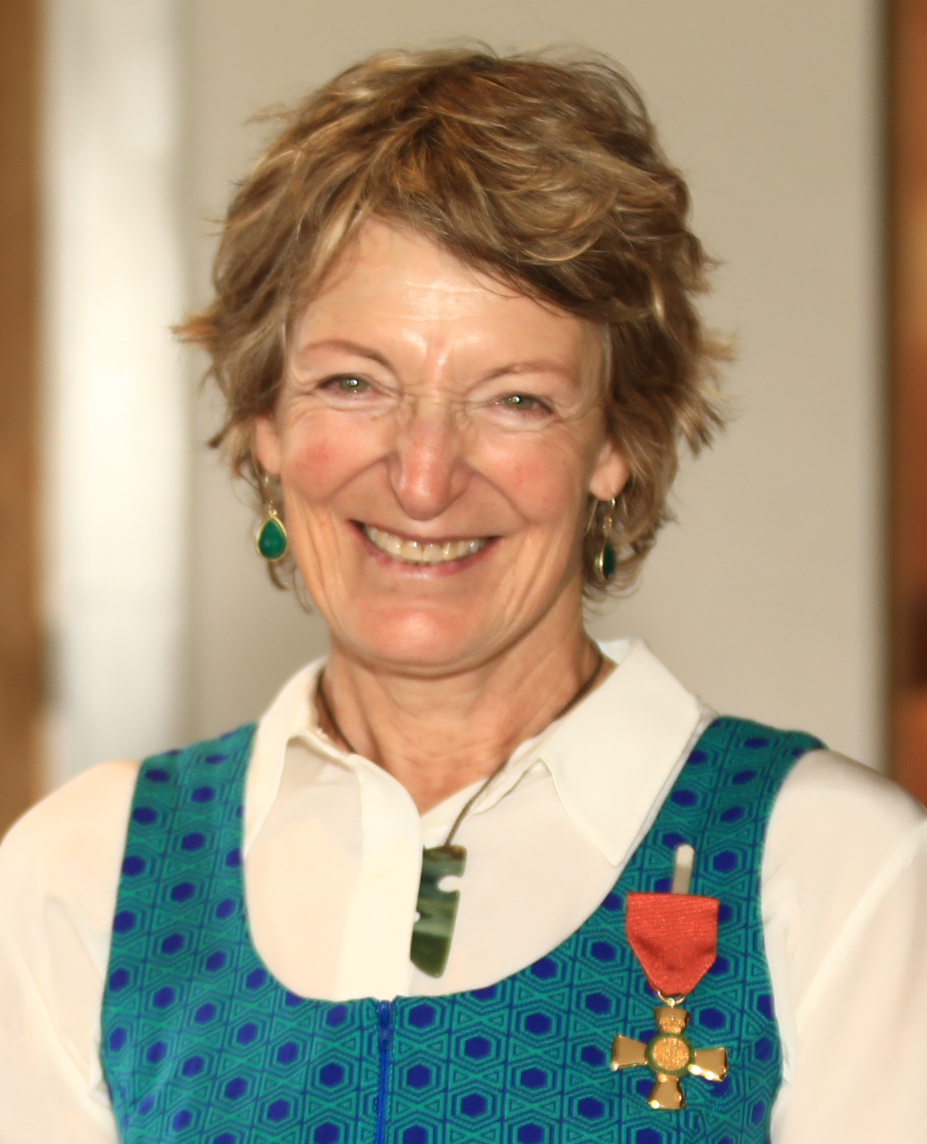
- Bradey in 2020
- Born: 9 October 1961 (age 65); Christchurch, New Zealand
- Occupation: mountaineer
- Known for: first woman to summit Mount Everest without supplemental oxygen (1988)
- Partner: Dean Staples

Lydia Pounamu Bradey ONZM (born 9 October 1961) is a New Zealand mountaineer. She became the first woman to summit Mount Everest without supplemental oxygen in 1988. She has climbed Mount Everest a total of six times.

== Early life ==
Lydia Bradey was born to Royce and John Bradey in Christchurch, New Zealand. Her father was absent for most of her childhood, and she and her mother struggled financially. Bradey took up mountain climbing as a teenager; she went on her first wilderness expedition at the age of 14, and by 17 she had climbed to the summits of Mount Cook and Mount Aspiring. During this time she regularly climbed with her friend Rob Hall, and later met his friend Gary Ball. When she was 19, Bradey left New Zealand for a four-year international climbing trip, which included an attempt on Denali in Alaska and ten ascents of Yosemite's big walls, seven of which were the first ascents by a female.

== Mountain climbing career ==
In 1987, Bradey reached the summit of Gasherbrum II, thereby becoming the first Australasian woman to climb one of the world's fourteen 8,000 metre peaks. The climb proved controversial since Bradey was climbing on a permit for the adjacent Gasherbrum I (a peak she had abandoned in favour of Gasherbrum II due to bad weather), making her ascent illegal. In October 1988, Bradey successfully solo climbed Mount Everest, making her the first female to reach the summit without supplemental oxygen, as well as the first New Zealand female and the youngest New Zealander at the time. This ascent, like the previous year on Gasherbrum II, broke rules agreed with the Nepalese. Bradey did not have a permit for the route she climbed, and to avoid being banned from the mountain, her teammates Rob Hall and Gary Ball said she had not reached the summit. When the Nepalese government threatened Bradey with a 10-year climbing ban, she too retracted her claim of a successful ascent, only to reassert her claim to the summit later.

In 1994, Bradey graduated from the University of Auckland with a degree in physiotherapy. She completed a certificate of acupuncture in 1998 and became an International Mountain & Ski Guide (IFMGA) in 2000. Since then she has worked as an alpine guide based in Wānaka. Bradey made her second summit climb of Mount Everest in May 2008, twenty years after her first ascent. She climbed as a guide for a group of clients under the outfitter Adventure Consultants (AC). In 2013, 2016 and 2018 Bradey made her third to fifth ascents of Everest, again as an AC guide; in 2019 she guided Everest for the sixth time, from Tibet, China for an American company Alpenglow Expeditions.

In the 2020 New Year Honours, Bradey was appointed an Officer of the New Zealand Order of Merit, for services to mountaineering.

== Personal life ==
Bradey lives in Lake Hāwea, Otago with her partner Dean Staples. Bradey was the subject of a biography, Lydia Bradey: Going Up is Easy, by Laurence Fearnley.

== See also ==
- List of Mount Everest summiteers by frequency
- List of Mount Everest guides
- List of Mount Everest records
- Francys Arsentiev
- Melissa Arnot (Summited Mount Everest without bottled oxygen in 2016)
