= Ang Rita Sherpa =

Nepalese mountain climber

- आङरिता शेर्पा
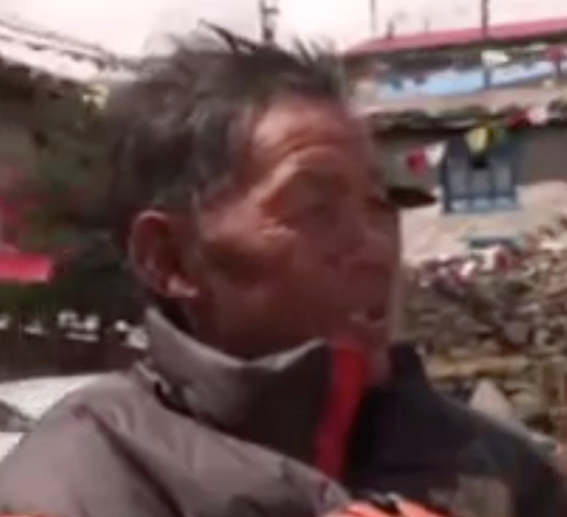
- Born: 20 September 1948; Solukhumbu, Nepal
- Died: 21 September 2020 (aged 72); Kathmandu, Nepal
- Other name: Snow Leopard
- Occupation: Mountaineer
- Years active: 1968–1996
- Known for: Most successful ascents of Mount Everest without bottled oxygen
- Honours: Order of Gorkha Dakshina Bahu; Order of Tri Shakti Patta

Ang Rita Sherpa (Nepali: आङरिता शेर्पा; 27 July 1948 – 21 September 2020) was a Nepalese mountaineer who climbed Mount Everest ten times without supplemental oxygen between 1983 and 1996. His sixth climb set the world record for the most successful ascents of Mount Everest, which he re-set on his tenth climb. Although others have since summited Everest more, he still holds the record for most summits without supplemental oxygen. He was also the first, and to date only, person to climb Mount Everest without supplemental oxygen in winter. He was nicknamed the "Snow Leopard" by his peers.

== Early life ==
Sherpa was born in 1948 in Thame, Solukhumbu. His family reared yaks. He spent his childhood looking after the yaks and as a porter on trading expeditions across the Himalayas to Tibet. He joined mountaineering as a porter at the age of 15. He did not receive any formal education or mountaineering training.

== Career ==
Sherpa's first successful climb was Cho Oyu at the age of 20. He went on to climb dozens of mountains including Mount Everest, K2, Cho Oyu, Lhotse, Manaslu, Annapurna and Dhaulagiri, multiple times without supplementary oxygen. He is thought to have successfully summited eight-thousanders a total of 18 times, almost all of them without oxygen.

Sherpa first climbed Mount Everest in 1983. In just over 13 years, he reached the summit of Everest nine more times without bottled oxygen. Eight of his ten summits were via the Southeast ridge route. His last summit was 12 days after the 1996 Everest disaster. He was distraught by the loss of his friends in the disaster. He fell ill that year. According to his family, King Birendra had sent Crown Prince Dipendra to relay his request that Sherpa retire from mountaineering, in view of his deteriorating health. He stopped mountaineering following the visit by the Crown Prince.

Sherpa was the first person to reach the summit of Everest in winter without supplementary oxygen, a feat he achieved on 22 December 1987. He was also the first person to climb Everest 10 times. He was recognised by the Guinness World Records in 2017 as the only person in the world to have climbed Mount Everest 10 times without bottled oxygen, a record he still holds in 2025.

Sherpa was considered by his peers to be the strongest and most skilled Sherpa guide of his time. According to Sherpa, he once signed up as a low-altitude porter in an expedition to Dhaulagiri but was made to carry equipment to Dhaulagiri-III camp, a task he successfully completed without shoes and any climbing gear. In April 1985, he successfully took the leader of the Norwegian team that he was guiding, to the summit of Mount Everest despite a blizzard. During his record-setting ascent of Everest in the winter of 1987, he assisted a South Korean team. According to Sherpa, after he and another climber got separated from the team one night, the two performed aerobic exercises all night to keep warm and alive. In 1990, he assisted a team from the Nepali Army in their Everest expedition. From the team that started its preparation with almost 50 members, only four reached the summit along with Sherpa, only one of them a soldier of the Nepali Army.

== Illness and death ==
Sherpa retired from mountaineering in 1996 after he fell ill due to a liver ailment that lasted the rest of his life. He also had a stroke around 2015–16. Sherpa died suddenly at his daughter's residence in Kathmandu, at around 10 A.M. on 21 September 2020, at age 72. Prime Minister KP Sharma Oli expressed his condolences on Twitter—"His accomplishments will be forever remembered."

Sherpa's body was kept in a gompa in Kathmandu before the funeral on 23 September. His funeral was held with national honours at Teku Dobhan, the holy confluence of Bagmati and Bishnumati rivers in Kathmandu, according to Buddhist customs. The minister of tourism and culture, Yogesh Bhattarai, draped his body with the national flag, and a squad from the Nepal Armed Police Force presented a gun salute.

== Personal life ==
Sherpa had three sons and a daughter. His eldest son, Karsang, was also a mountaineer and had summited Everest nine times; he died during an expedition in 2012. His second son, Chhewang, also summited Everest five times. Ang Rita's wife died a year after the death of their eldest son. Ang Rita lived the last years of his life at his daughter's residence in Jorpati, Kathmandu. His grandson, Phura Gyaljen Sherpa, from his youngest son, died during the 2026 spring Everest expedition.

== Awards and honours ==
Sherpa was a recipient of the Order of Gorkha Dakshina Bahu and the Order of Tri Shakti Patta.

== Mount Everest ascents ==
List of Ang Rita Sherpa's ascents to Everest without bottled oxygen
	Date	Route to Summit	Record
1.	7 May 1983	South East Ridge	
2.	15 October 1984	South Pillar	
3.	29 April 1985	South East Ridge	
4.	22 December 1987	South East Ridge	First person to climb Mount Everest in winter without supplementary oxygen
5.	14 October 1988	South East Ridge	
6.	23 April 1990	South East Ridge	Highest number of successful ascents of Mount Everest (6); Highest number of successful ascents of Mount Everest without supplementary oxygen (6)
7.	15 May 1992	South East Ridge	Highest number of successful ascents of Mount Everest without supplementary oxygen (7)
8.	16 May 1993	South East Ridge	Highest number of successful ascents of Mount Everest without supplementary oxygen (8)
9.	13 May 1995	North Col – Northeast Ridge	Highest number of successful ascents of Mount Everest without supplementary oxygen (9)
10.	23 May 1996	South East Ridge	Highest number of successful ascents of Mount Everest (10); Highest number of successful ascents of Mount Everest without supplementary oxygen (10)

== See also ==
- List of 20th-century summiters of Mount Everest
- List of Mount Everest summiters by number of times to the summit
