= Garrett Madison =

American mountaineer and guide (born 1978)

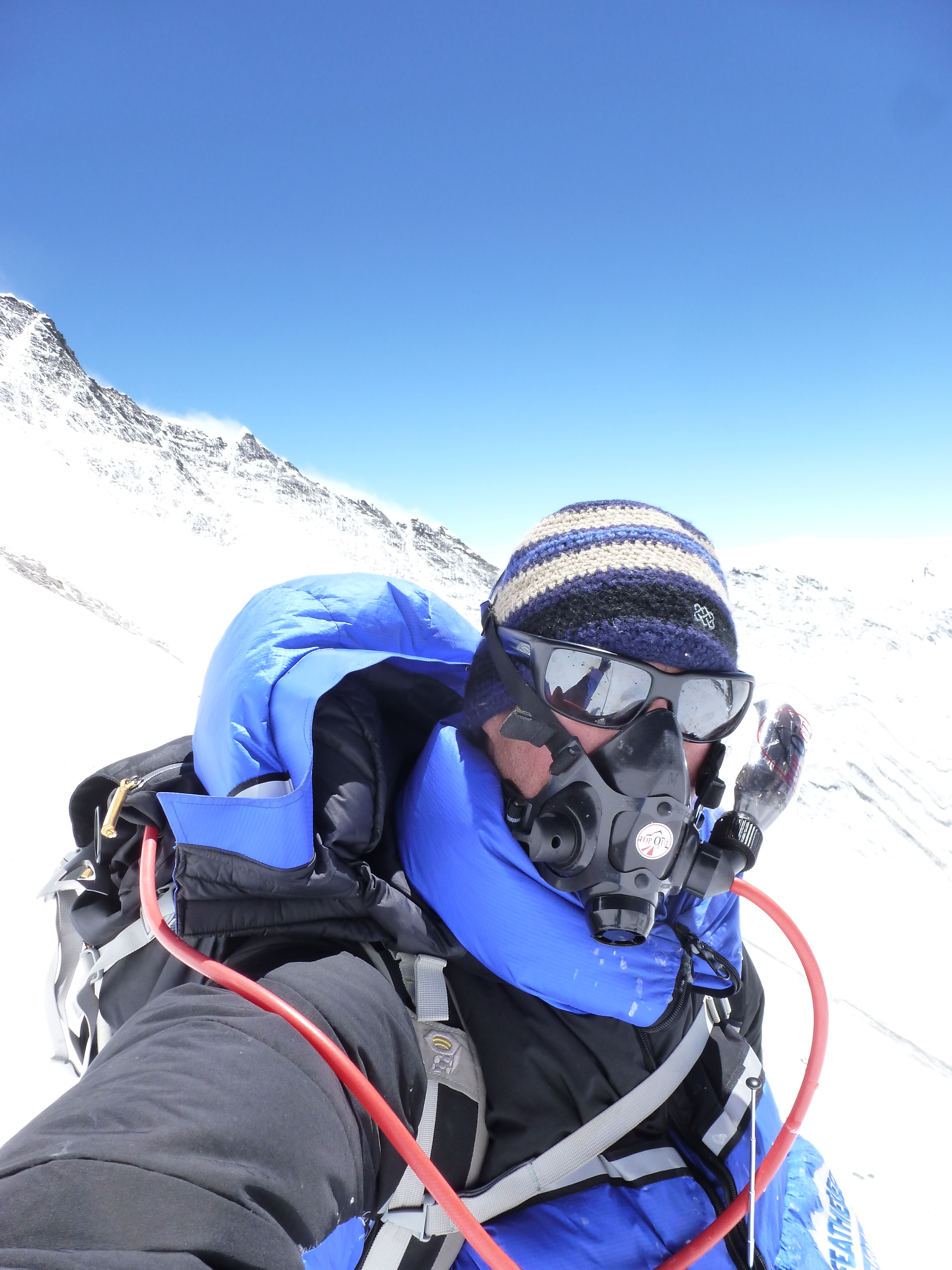
- Born: November 3, 1978 (age 47); Seattle, Washington, U.S.
- Education: Western Washington University
- Occupation: Mountaineer
- Parent(s): James Christian and Mary Margaret Madison

Garrett Madison (born November 3, 1978) is an American mountaineer and expedition leader. Madison began guiding professionally in 1999 on Mount Rainier and has climbed Mount Everest 16 times. His company, Madison Mountaineering, specializes in climbs on Mount Everest and other high altitude peaks, operates on the highest peaks on all seven continents, and also provides training programs and summit climbs in Washington State.

== Climbing career ==
On May 19–20, 2011, he reached the summit of Mount Everest on his fourth successful attempt as expedition leader and guide for Alpine Ascents International, and reached the summit of Lhotse (4th highest mountain in the world) 21 hours later as guide to climber Tom Halliday. Also on the expedition was guide Michael Horst who made both summits as well in under a 24-hour period, a few days earlier. This was the first time that both Everest and Lhotse were summited together in under 24 hours, and Madison repeated the "double header" feat again in 2013, 2018, 2022 and 2023 and is currently the only climber in the world to have done so five times. Madison holds the record for guiding the most number of climbers (12) in reaching the summits of two 8000-meter peaks within 24 hours.

In 2014, Madison led the first successfully guided ascent of K2, arguably the hardest and most dangerous mountain in the world. He reached the summit with two climbers and three Sherpas on July 27, 2014, again on July 22, 2018, with 8 clients, 3 guides, and 15 Sherpas, on July 28, 2021, with a summit team of 21, again on July 22, 2022, with a summit team of 15, and most recently on July 29, 2024, with a summit team of 18. Madison also regularly guides many Seven Summits expeditions during the year such as Carstensz Pyramid, Aconcagua, Vinson Massif, Kilimanjaro and Elbrus as well as first ascents of unclimbed peaks in the Himalayas.

In addition, Madison is regularly involved with film productions on Everest, participating in four different features over three years. Most recently, Madison's company, Madison Mountaineering, brought a virtual reality camera to the summit of Mount Everest. As an executive producer, Garrett Madison was awarded the 2017 Sports Emmy in Outstanding Digital Innovation for the resulting SI.com/Life VR production, Capturing Everest.

Madison was leading a team of climbers up Mount Everest when the April 2015 Nepal earthquake triggered an avalanche, resulting in the deadliest day in Everest's history. The team's doctor, Eve Girawong, was one of the American fatalities.

Madison holds multiple high altitude mountaineering world records such as being the only person to climb Mount Everest and nearby Lhotse in a day, five times. He is the only American to climb K2 four times, and personally has led more climbers to the summits of Mount Everest and K2 than anyone.

In addition to leading high-altitude expeditions worldwide throughout the year, Madison consults on mountaineering equipment development and testing and is an athlete for Mountain Hardwear. Mountain Hardwear offers a selection of high-altitude expedition gear personally designed and endorsed by Madison in the Garrett Madison Collection.

Madison speaks professionally to organizations and teams about his mountaineering experiences, leadership, and managing risk. Some recent examples include Google, Microsoft, Amazon, Facebook, SAP, and many others. Madison’s forthcoming book “High-Stakes Leadership: When Your Life And The Lives Of Others Hang In The Balance” is coming soon.

== Media ==
Outside Magazine's story of the deadly September 2012 avalanche on Manaslu is supported with photos and notes of Madison's mountain rescue and recovery efforts.

An interview and story of Madison's 2012 Mount Everest summit was published in the October 2012 issue of Outside Magazine.

The MTN Meister Podcast featured an interview with Madison in 2014 detailing, among other things, his ascent of K2 that was the mountain's first guided climb.

Outside Magazine featured Madison on the cover of their 2015 Adventure Issue.

People Magazine and The Today Show both highlighted Madison's experience during the April 2015 Nepal earthquake while covering the tragedy.

In July 2015, ESPN featured Madison in a video about Mount Everest.

The Himalayan Times covered Madison’s successful first ascent of Nupla Khang in November 2018.

Madison frequently provides narration and commentary for mountaineering media productions, such as Netflix's 14 Peaks: Nothing Is Impossible film.

== See also ==
- List of Mount Everest summiters by number of times to the summit
