= Kushang Sherpa =

Nepalese Indian mountaineer (1965–2024)

Personal information
- Nationality: Nepalese, Indian (later)
- Born: Kushang Dorjee Sherpa; 15 February 1965 Olangchung Gola, Nepal
- Died: 7 December 2024 (aged 59) Darjeeling, West Bengal, India
- Occupations: Mountaineer and Instructor at Himalayan Mountaineering Institute
- Children: 4

Climbing career
- Major ascents: Mount Everest (1993, 1996, 1998, 1999)

Kushang Dorjee Sherpa (15 February 1965 – 7 December 2024) was a Nepalese-Indian Sherpa mountaineer, who in 1998 became the first person to reach the summit of Mount Everest from three sides. In recognition of his achievements, the Government of India awarded him the Tenzing Norgay National Adventure Award in 2003.

== Early life ==
Kushang Sherpa was born on 15 February 1965, in Olangchung Gola, Nepal. He ran away from home at the age of 14 to work as a porter on an expedition that was passing through his village. He was the first person to have summited Mount Everest from three sides. Sherpa lived in Darjeeling, West Bengal, as of 2015.

== Ascents ==
Sherpa was the first person who summited Mount Everest from three sides. Kushang Dorjee Sherpa first summited the Everest on 10 May 1993, via the standard south east ridge route. Next, he summited via the standard north east ridge route, on 17 May 1996. On 28 May 1998, he summited the standard south east ridge a third time. His fourth summit was via the east face of the Everest, on 28 May 1999. Kushang Sherpa lived in Darjeeling as of 2015.

== Death ==
Sherpa died at his home in Darjeeling, on 7 December 2024, at the age of 59.

== See also ==
- List of Mount Everest records of India
- List of Mount Everest records
- List of Mount Everest summiters by number of times to the summit
