= Gheorghe Dijmărescu =

Romanian-American mountaineer (died 2020)

Gheorghe Dijmărescu (commonly known as George Dijmarescu, 1962 – September 2020) was a Romanian known for escaping from the Romanian dictator Nicolae Ceaușescu by swimming across the Danube River. He was on mountaineering expeditions and summited Mount Everest nine times.

He was married to Lhakpa Sherpa until their separation due to Dijmărescu's abusive behavior.

== Background ==
Dijmărescu was born in Turcinești, Romania in southwestern Romania. He worked as a building contractor. He was noted for reaching the summit of Mount Everest nine times. The record was eventually overtaken by Dave Hahn from New York in 2008. In 2004, Dijmărescu and fellow climber David Watson organized the rescue of a Mexican climber who had trouble descending, which Watson later noted as an example of what should have been done for David Sharp, who died high on Everest in May 2006.

Dijmărescu married Lhakpa Sherpa in 2002, the first Nepali woman to summit Mount Everest and survive, who also has the record (as of 2026) for the most summits of Mount Everest by a woman at 11. They met in Kathmandu, Nepal in the year 2000.

Michael Kodas' book High Crimes details allegations of physical violence and aggressive behavior by Dijmărescu, about a 2004 Connecticut expedition to Mount Everest which Dijmărescu organized. In his book, Kodas details Dijmărescu as an angry, short-tempered, and violent man with dictatorial tendencies. Kodas recounts how he witnessed Dijmărescu beat his wife Lhakpa Sherpa causing her to lose consciousness in Everest's Tibetan base camp, and how Dijmărescu threatened him to the point that he feared Dijmărescu would break into their tents at night and assault them. After returning to Connecticut, Kodas installed a security system at his home because he considered his family's safety threatened due to Dijmărescu's continued threats.

Dijmărescu's marriage with Lhakpa Sherpa came apart in 2012 after a violent episode. He beat Lhakpa Sherpa, requiring his wife to seek medical attention. Lhakpa Sherpa was taken to an emergency room. After release, Lhakpa Sherpa and her two daughters stayed at a local shelter for eight months.

== Danube escape ==
Dijmărescu survived a swim across the Danube to leave his native Romania. The swim took over an hour and was timed to avoid guards who had been known to kill those who tried to swim across. He managed to make his way through Yugoslavia and get to Italy. From there he was granted political asylum in the United States and eventually settled in New England.

== Death ==
From 2008, Dijmărescu battled health issues. He died of cancer in September 2020, aged 58, in the United States.

== Dijmărescu's Mount Everest summit record ==
Dijmărescu summited Mount Everest:

1. May 26, 1999
2. May 19, 2000
3. May 23, 2001
4. May 17, 2002
5. May 31, 2003
6. May 20, 2004
7. Jun 2, 2005
8. May 11, 2006
9. May 15, 2007

== See also ==
- List of 20th-century summiters of Mount Everest
- List of Mount Everest summiters by number of times to the summit
