= Göran Kropp =

Swedish adventurer (1966–2002)

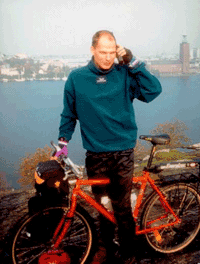
- Kropp in October 1995
- Born: Lars Olof Göran Kropp; 11 December 1966; Jönköping, Sweden
- Died: 30 September 2002 (aged 35); Vantage, Washington, U.S.
- Occupations: Adventurer, mountaineer, endurance cyclist
- Known for: Solo ascent of Mount Everest

Lars Olof Göran Kropp (11 December 1966 – 30 September 2002) was a Swedish mountaineer, the first Scandinavian to climb Mount Everest without oxygen. He made a solo ascent of Mount Everest without bottled oxygen or Sherpa support on 23 May 1996, after traveling there from Sweden by bicycle and foot.

== Early life ==
In 1972 Kropp's father took him up Galdhøpiggen, Norway, the highest peak in Scandinavia. After finishing school, he served in the Swedish Parachute Rangers, where he trained rigorously and met his future climbing partner Mats Dahlin.

== Mountaineering ==
In 1988, Kropp traveled to climb his first major peak, Lenin Peak (7134 meters high), located on the border between Tajikistan and Kyrgyzstan. Kropp and his companions ascended the peak in a record time of 10 days.

In 1989, Kropp had hopes of climbing Cho Oyu, but he had no permit. Instead, he went to South America and climbed Iliniza Sur (5266 meters), Cotopaxi (5897 meters), Illimani (6300 meters), Huayna Potosi (6088 meters), and Illampu (6520 meters).

In a 1990 Swedish expedition, he and Danish climber Rafael Jensen climbed Muztagh Tower (7273 meters) in Pakistan. The mountain is one of the most difficult 7000-meter mountains in the Himalayas, and their ascent was the fourth of the mountain.

In 1991, Kropp climbed Pik Pobeda (7439 meters) in eastern Kyrgyzstan. Together with Mats Dahlin, Kropp made a summit attempt, but Dahlin was forced to cancel his bid because of illness. Kropp continued and reached the top with a severe headache.

In 1992, Kropp finally obtained permits to climb Cho Oyu. In preparation, he climbed with Dahlin in Chamonix. While climbing the Aiguille Verte, a stone fell from the top of the ridge and hit Dahlin just below the helmet, at the edge of his temple, killing him.

Kropp decided to climb Cho Oyu nonetheless, on the grounds that his companion would have preferred that he do so. He drove his Range Rover all the way to Nepal. At the top, Kropp placed Dahlin's ice axe with an image of Dahlin directed towards Mount Everest.

=== K2 ===
In 1993, Kropp returned to Karakoram, this time to climb K2. Initially, he planned to participate in a Swedish expedition, but Kropp realized that if he could reach the top before the expedition's other participants, he would become the first Swede and Scandinavian to reach the top. Kropp therefore joined a Slovenian expedition scheduled to climb the mountain before the Swedes. Another reason why he brought forward the date of his climb was that his Range Rover had remained in Pakistan since his Cho Oyu climb the previous year because customs in Iran refused to allow it through.

Kropp's Slovenian colleagues had decided, however, to exclude him from their climbing plans. Kropp settled instead for joining David Sharman, who hoped to become the first Englishman to come down alive from the top.

During the Slovenians' summit bid, a violent storm arose and stranded them at high altitude. Kropp abandoned his climb to save those he could. A week after this incident, he stuck with his British colleague, but Sharman fell, fractured a leg, and went back down. Kropp climbed on and reached the peak solo, without bottled oxygen. On the way down another storm on the mountain marooned Kropp at 8,000 meters above sea level. Kropp made it later to base camp.

Media interest after the climb proved to be extensive, and Kropp then started his company, Kropp & Adventure AB.

In 1994, he returned again to Karakoram, accompanied by Andrew Lock and the Swedish climbers Mats Holmgren and Nicolas Gafgo. Their object was Broad Peak, and their goal was a first ascent of the hitherto unclimbed south-southwest ridge, on which several reputable climbers had failed. They also failed and had to turn back to below 7000 metres. Afterwards, they focused on the regular route to the summit, where, on the first attempt Lock, Holmgren, and Kropp reached the foresummit. Kropp made another attempt at the main summit and succeeded after a fast, non-stop solo climb.

=== Mount Everest ===
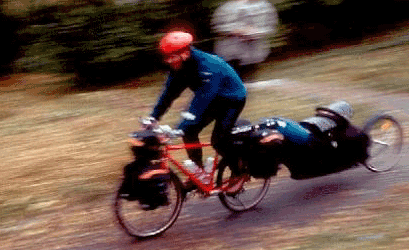
Göran Kropp leaving Stockholm in October 1995, en route for Mount Everest.

For his 1996 ascent, Kropp left Stockholm on 16 October 1995, on a specially designed bicycle with 108 kilograms (238 lb) of gear and food. He traveled 13,000 kilometres (8,000 mi) on the bicycle and arrived at Everest Base Camp in April 1996. Following a meeting of all of the Everest expeditions on the mountain at the time, it was agreed that Kropp would attempt to summit first. On 3 May, Kropp climbed through thigh-deep snow and reached Everest's South Summit, a point 100 metres (328 ft) from the summit. However, he decided to turn around because it was too late in the day and if he continued, he would be descending in the dark. While Kropp recovered from the ordeal at base camp, the 1996 Everest Disaster unfolded. He helped bring medicine up the mountain. Three weeks later, on 23 May, he again tackled the mountain, this time successfully summiting without extra oxygen support. He then cycled part of the way back home.

He returned to Everest in 1999 with his girlfriend Renata Chlumska to undertake a cleanup, during which they removed 25 discarded canisters from the mountain. They also successfully summited together.

== Controversy ==
In early 2000, Kropp and fellow Swede Ola Skinnarmo attempted to ski unsupported to the North Pole. Kropp had to abandon the expedition due to a frostbitten thumb. During the expedition, he shot a polar bear which had been stalking the two men. This led to accusations in the Swedish tabloid press by writer Jan Guillou that Kropp was a poacher, since shooting polar bears was an inevitable consequence of skiing across the North Pole. Kropp sued for libel and when he lost, decided to move to Seattle in the US.

Later that year, in London, the 1996 Everest expedition leader, Michael Trueman, successfully sued the publisher of Kropp's autobiography for libel. Kropp had mixed Trueman's name up with that of expedition member Mike Burns and thereby made false allegations about Trueman's character.

== Death ==
On 30 September 2002, Kropp died from head injuries when he fell 18 metres (60 feet) while ascending the Air Guitar route at Frenchman Coulee near Vantage, Washington. While being belayed by Seattle climber Erden Eruç, his protection pulled out from a crack, and the wire-gate carabiner of the next piece of protection broke. According to Eruç, Kropp died on impact.

== Racing career ==
Kropp drove a couple of seasons in the Swedish and Nordic Formula Three series. His last race was in 2000. Kropp loved fast sports cars and drove Ferraris and Maseratis privately on the road. Together with von Braun Sports Cars he developed an advanced Ferrari F355 GT car for endurance racing. Only a few test races were made before he died.

== Tribute ==
At the starting point of the climbing route Air Guitar at Sunshine Rock outside Seattle on which Kropp had died, climbing partner Erden Eruç, from Seattle, carved into the rock:

With a thumb up
Kropp on Top!
Göran lives
1966–2002

== Literature and movies ==
=== Books ===
Göran Kropp 8000+ (1997, Bokförlaget DN). By Göran Kropp and David Lagercrantz. English translation: Ultimate High. My Everest Odyssey (1999, Discovery Books)

=== Movies ===
I Made It: Göran Kropp's Incredible Journey to the Top of the World (1997)

Mt. Everest: The Fatal Climb (1999)

Beyond Tingri (2022)

== Bibliography ==
- Kropp, Göran (1999). Ultimate High: My Everest Odyssey. Discovery Books. ISBN 1-56331-830-X.
