= Iván Vallejo =

Ecuadorian mountaineer

Ivan Vallejo
- Born: Iván Vallejo Ricaurte; 19 December 1959 (age 66); Ambato, Ecuador
- Occupation: High-altitude mountaineer

Iván Vallejo (born 19 December 1959) is a high-altitude mountaineer from Ecuador. On 1 May 2008, he became the 14th person to reach the summit of all 14 mountains above 8,000 meters (the “eight-thousanders”), and the 7th without use of supplemental oxygen. He is the first, and still the only, Southern Hemisphere climber to complete all 14 eight-thousanders, without supplemental oxygen.

== Biography ==
Iván Vallejo Ricaurte was born in Ambato, Ecuador in 1959 and is the father of Andy and Kamilla. He graduated as a chemical engineer and taught mathematics to university students from 1988 to 2000. At that stage, he decided to become a full-time mountain climber.

Iván began climbing mountains in Ecuador such as Illiniza Norte, Rumiñahui, Tungurahua and Carihuairazo and soon enough, his hobby became a passion. On Oct 23, 1978, he reached the summit of Chimborazo (6,310 m), his country’s highest peak. In 1988 he started climbing in the Cordillera Blanca (Peru) and in Bolivia, having summitted mountains such as Artesonraju, Alpamayo, Huascarán and Illampu.

In 1995 he climbed the highest peak in the Alps (Mont Blanc) and his first Himalayan mountain (Island Peak, 6,187 m). The following year, he returned to Nepal and reached the summit of Ama Dablam (6,856 m) and in 1997, he stood on top of his first eight-thousander – Manaslu (8,163 m). In 1998, he climbed Broad Peak (8,048 m) and in 1999, he summitted Mount Everest for the first time, thus becoming the first Ecuadorian to reach the top of the world's highest mountain. On May 22, 2006 Vallejo and João Garcia from Portugal, got to the mountaintop of Kangchenjunga.

On May 1, 2008, he finished climbing all 14 eight-thousanders. As of 2008, only 18 other climbers have accomplished this feat. Iván is amongst the few 10 of them to do so without supplemental oxygen, in a time span of 11 years.

Ivan Vallejo is the current Minister of Sports in Ecuador.

Iván is now considering other projects:

"There are always challenges, things you’ve never done before and you’d like to try. Polar expeditions are especially appealing: Moving on a different terrain, solve other kinds of obstacles and difficulties. I’ll start working on it when I’m done with the 14, 8000ers."

These include "Somos Ecuador" which aims at climbing major mountain peaks around the world, as described in a TEDx talk from Everest North Face Advanced Base Camp.

== Timeline of "Desafio 14" ==
1. 1997 – Manaslu (8,163 m)
2. 1998 – Broad Peak (8,047 m)
3. 1999, 2001 – Everest (8,848 m)
4. 2000 – K2 (8,611 m)
5. 2002 – Cho Oyu (8,201 m)
6. 2003 – Lhotse (8,516 m)
7. 2003 – Gasherbrum II (8,035 m)
8. 2003 – Gasherbrum I (8,068 m)
9. 2004 – Makalu (8,463 m)
10. 2004 – Shisha Pangma (8,027 m)
11. 2005 – Nanga Parbat (8,125 m)
12. 2006 – Kangchenjunga (8,586 m)
13. 2007 – Annapurna (8,091 m)
14. 2008 – Dhaulagiri (8,167 m)

== See also ==
- List of 20th-century summiters of Mount Everest
- Eight-thousander#Climbers with verified ascents of all 14 eight-thousanders
- Behind the Mist
