= Dölf Reist =

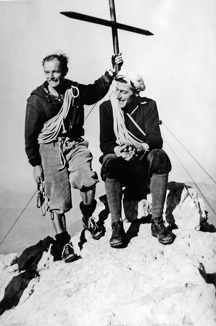
Dölf Reist (left) standing next to Ernst Reiss in 1951, on the summit Fleischbank mountain in the Kaiser mountain range in the Alps

Dölf Reist (1921-2000) was a Swiss mountaineer, best known for the third successful summit of Mount Everest on 23 May 1956, as part of the 1956 Swiss Expedition to Everest and Lhotse.

Reist and Ernst Reiss are said to have formed "one of the best leaderless rope teams in Switzerland".

Reist was part of the second two-man team to reach the Summit, and he climbed with Hans Ruedi von Gunten.

== See also ==
- List of 20th-century summiters of Mount Everest
