= Willie Benegas =

American mountaineer

Willie Benegas is an Argentinian-American mountaineer notable for successfully summiting Mount Everest thirteen times. Benegas has also summited Aconcagua and several volcanos in Guatemala.

Originally hailing from Argentina, Benegas now resides in Utah. In 2005, while serving as a guide for Mountain Madness, Benegas earned a reputation as a well-respected and affable presence at Everest base camp (EBC), often offering assistance to fellow climbers. In addition to his feats on Everest and Aconcagua, Benegas has also climbed several other Himalayan mountains, including Manaslu, Cho Oyu, and Makalu. In an interview with one of his fellow Everest climbers, Benegas recounted how he cautiously entered the "dead bodies tent" to help with saving the life of a man who others had given up hope on. Despite the man suffering from severe injuries and fluid in his lungs, Benegas was able to create an airway and rally a group of Sherpa people to assist in carrying him down the mountain. The man was successfully evacuated by helicopter the following day, after the 2015 Mount Everest avalanches.

Benegas has reached the summit of Mount Everest thirteen times, in 1999, 2001, 2002, 2004, 2005, 2007 (twice), 2008, 2009, 2010, 2012, 2017, and 2018.

== Famous quotes ==
“If I think it’s dangerous, we go with my opinion. If you think it’s dangerous, even if I’m your guide, I will go with your opinion. If you aren’t feeling comfortable, always speak your mind.”

== See also ==
- List of Mount Everest summiteers by number of times to the summit
- List of 20th-century summiteers of Mount Everest
