= Babu Chiri Sherpa =

Nepalese mountaineer (1965–2001)

- Babu Chiri Sherpa in 2000
- Born: 22 June 1965; Taksindu, Solukhumbu District, Nepal
- Died: 29 April 2001 (aged 35); Mount Everest
- Occupation: Mountaineer
- Known for: Summited Mount Everest 10 times Spent night on Everest summit (21 hours)

Babu Chiri Sherpa (22 June 1965 – 29 April 2001) was a Nepalese Sherpa mountaineer. He reached the summit of Mount Everest ten times. He held two world records on Everest. He spent 21 hours on the summit of Mount Everest without auxiliary oxygen, a record which still stands, and he made the fastest ascent of Mount Everest in 16 hours and 56 minutes. An accomplished mountaineer, his life dream was to build schools in Nepal.

== Early life ==
Babu Chiri Sherpa was born in Taksindu, a small Sherpa village near Salleri, the headquarters of Solukhumbu District in Nepal. As a child he spent most of his time helping his parents on their farm. Babu Chiri received no formal education as no schools existed in his or surrounding villages.

Babu had taught himself to read, and his life dream was to build a school.

As a boy, Chiri was amazed by the mountains that surrounded his village. Many Sherpas support themselves by guiding and portering in the mountains. The legend of Tenzing Norgay, and Norgay himself, influenced Chiri.

== Mountaineering ==
He began his career as a climber at the age of 16 when he procured a job as a trekking porter. On his first portering assignment he scaled the Amphu Labtsa pass. He summited Mera Peak (6472 m) in four hours in 1985. Chiri eventually found work portering for Everest expeditions, and eventually reached the summit of Mount Everest ten times. In May 1999, he spent a record 21 hours on the summit without supplementary oxygen, and without sleeping.

He also went on some expeditions to Cho Oyu.

== Personal life and death ==
Babu Chiri spoke Sherpa, Nepali, English and Hindi. He traveled to Canada, China, Italy, Mexico, Pakistan and the United States.

He had six daughters, four granddaughters: Michele, Amira, Sara, Jenica; and two grandsons: Chhewang and Urgen.

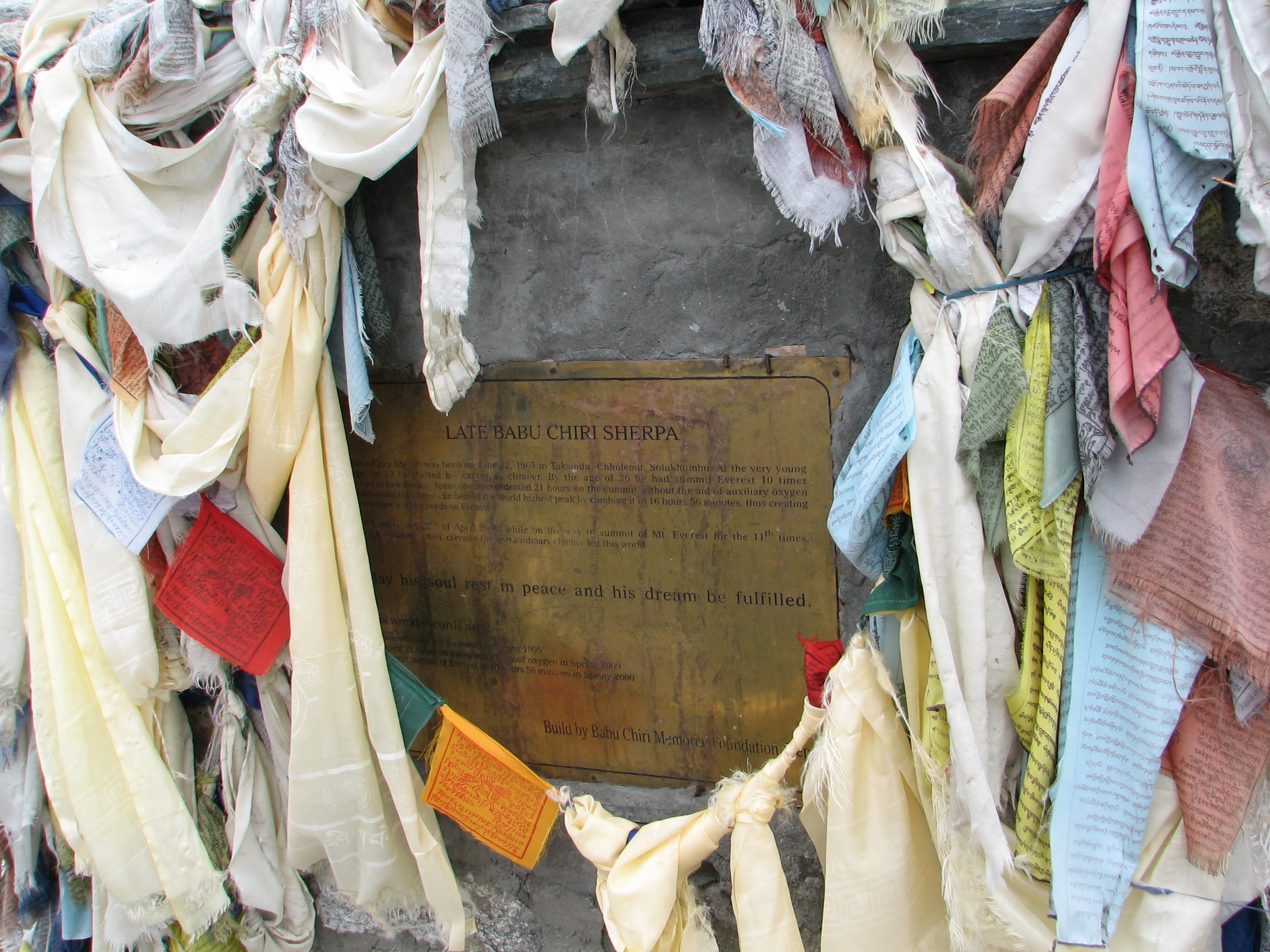
Babu Chiri Sherpa memorial near Mount Everest base camp

In 2001, Chiri signed on for his 11th Everest expedition. He was planning another bid for the summit. On 29 April, while near Camp II (6,500 m) and apparently taking photographs, Chiri fell into a crevasse, and died.

== Legacy ==
Chiri was an environmentalist and a humanitarian. He worked to have a school built in his home village; the school was completed before his death. On 25 September 2005, the Royal Nepali Government, as represented by the Crown Prince, inaugurated the Babu Chiri Memorial Museum and erected a statue of Chiri. The museum and statue were both built by the Everest Summiteers Association (ESA) with financial contributions from the government, local businesses, social organizations and individuals. The museum and statue are located in Til Ganga, Kathmandu.

== Summits/expeditions ==
Everest

1. 6 October 1990
2. 22 May 1991
3. 10 October 1993
4. 14 May 1995
5. 26 May 1995
6. 23 May 1996
7. 21 May 1997
8. 6 May 1999
9. 26 May 1999
10. 21 May 2000

== See also ==
- List of people who died climbing Mount Everest
- List of Mount Everest summiters by number of times to the summit
- List of Mount Everest records
