= Pasang Dawa Sherpa =

Nepali mountaineer

- Born: January 18, 1977 (age 49); Pangboche, Nepal
- Other name: PaDawa
- Occupation: Mountaineering
- Known for: 31 ascents of Mount Everest
- Relatives: Dorjee Gyaljen Sherpa (Brother)

Pasang Dawa Sherpa (born 1977), more commonly known as 'PaDawa', is a Nepali mountain guide from Pangboche, Nepal. He is best known for having the second highest number of successful summits on Mount Everest with 31. Only Kami Rita Sherpa has more ascents with 32 as of June 2026.

== Everest ascents ==
Pasang Dawa made his first successful ascent of Everest in 1998 when he was 21 years old whilst guiding British Adventurer Bear Grylls. He has since climbed Everest another thirty times, often making multiple ascents in the same season, either as a mountain guide or as part of the rope-fixing team.

On 14 May 2023, PaDawa equalised the record with Kami Rita Sherpa for most ascents of Everest, both with 26, however 3 days later on 17 May, Kami Rita stood on the summit for his 27th ascent, reclaiming the record. On 22 May 2023, Pasang Dawa made another ascent of Everest which equalised the record once more. Kami Rita made his second ascent of the season only a day later on 23 May 2023, regaining the lead. On 18 May 2026, PaDawa became the second person in history to reach the summit of Everest 30 times. Just 4 days later on 22 May 2026, PaDawa had reached the summit of Everest again for his 31st time, bringing him only one ascent away from equaling the record with Kami Rita Sherpa for most ascents of Everest.

=== Awards ===
In 2026, he was awarded the International Sagarmatha Award, the Nepalese State's highest award for mountaineering, on the 73rd annual Everest Day.

== 8,000m Ascents ==
8,000m ascents
Name of Mountain	Number of Ascents
Everest	31
Cho Oyu	5
Lhotse	1
Manaslu	1
