= Nepal Mountaineering Association =

The Nepal Mountaineering Association (NMA) is the national mountaineering association of Nepal. The NMA was founded in 1973 with the goals of promoting mountaineering activities in the Himalaya, providing safety awareness and mountaineering skills to Nepalese mountaineers and creating awareness of the beauty of the Himalayas both nationally and in international communities. The NMA is an active member of the UIAA since 1975.

Until October 2015, the NMA also used to be responsible for administering climbing permits for 27 mountains with altitudes between 5,800 metres and 6,600 metres categorised as trekking peaks, while permits for all other mountains open for climbing in Nepal (approximately 300 peaks) are issued by the Ministry of Culture, Tourism and Civil Aviation (MoTCA). In October 2015 the Government of Nepal ended the NMA's monopoly over issuing the permits for the trekking peaks and transferred that authority to MoTCA. The decision had followed criticism by Nepali mountaineering stakeholders over alleged lack of transparency regarding the large sums the NMA had collected though permit issuance.

== See also ==
- List of Mount Everest guides
- Nepal Mountain Academy
