= WCB =

WCB may refer to:

- Warrnambool Cheese and Butter, an Australian company
- Wellington College Belfast, a secondary school in Northern Ireland
- West Coast Bancorp, a publicly traded financial services holding company
- Westcombe Park railway station, London, England, National Rail station code
- Write combining, a computer bus technique
- WCB Wasafi, Tanzanian record label

== See also ==
- WCBS (disambiguation)
