= OGA Golf Course =

Public golf course in Woodburn, Oregon

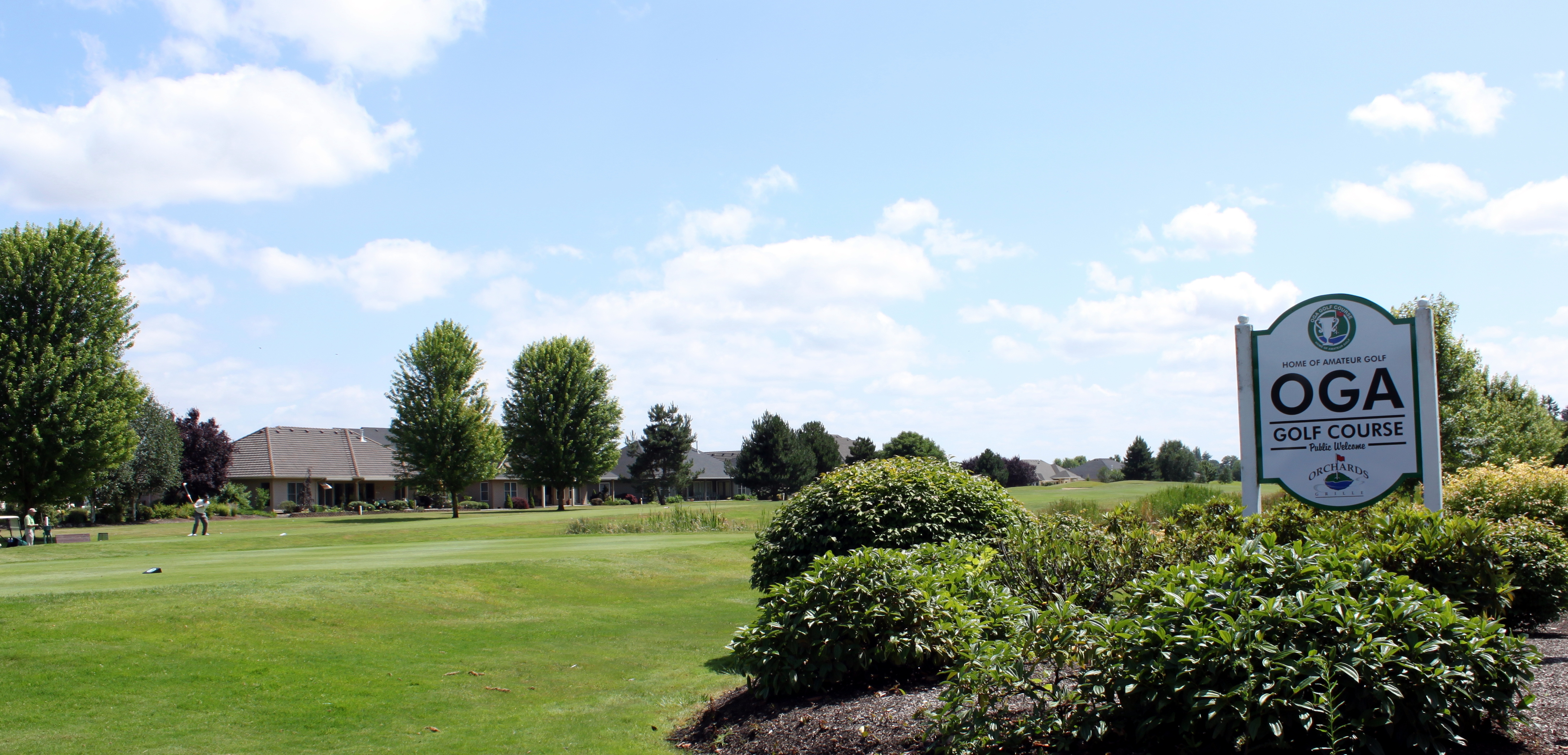
OGA Golf Course

The Oregon Golf Association (OGA) Golf Course is a public golf course located in Woodburn, Oregon. The course was rated by Golf Digest in 1996 as "One of the Top Ten Affordable Courses in the US." It is located at 45.1606164°N 122.8477049°W.
