= Scott Fischer =

American mountaineer (1955–1996)

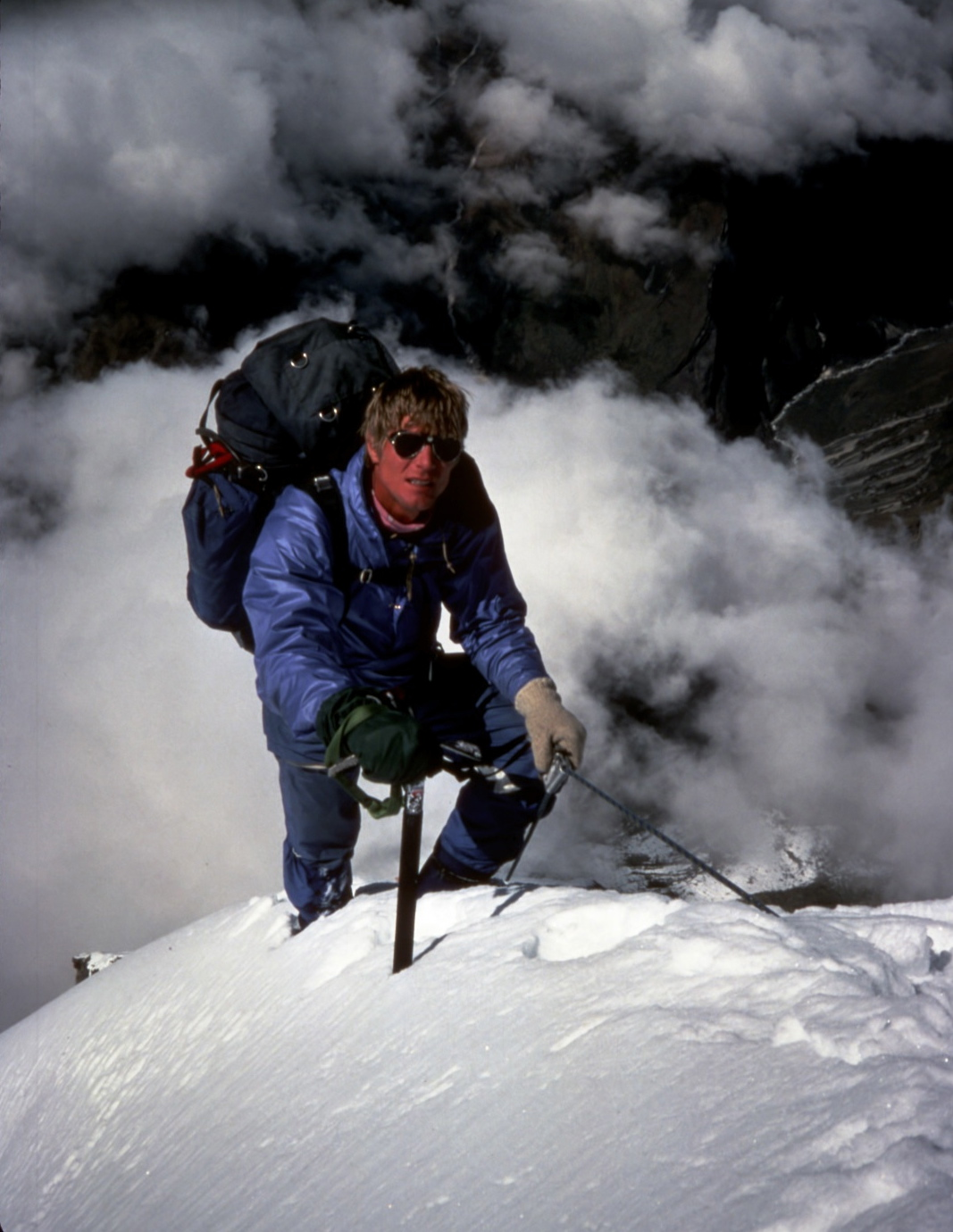
- Fischer on Annapurna Fang in 1984
- Born: December 24, 1955; Muskegon, Michigan, United States
- Died: May 11, 1996 (aged 40); Mount Everest, Nepal
- Cause of death: Exposure, AMS
- Occupation: Mountain guide
- Known for: First American to summit Lhotse
- Spouse: Jeannie Price
- Children: 2

Scott Eugene Fischer (December 24, 1955 – May 11, 1996) was an American mountaineer and mountain guide. He was renowned for ascending the world's highest mountains without supplemental oxygen. Fischer and Wally Berg were the first Americans to summit Lhotse (8,516 metres (27,940 ft)), the world's fourth highest peak. Fischer, Charley Mace, and Ed Viesturs summitted K2 (8,611 metres (28,251 ft)) without supplemental oxygen. Fischer first climbed Mount Everest (8,848.86 m (29,031 ft 8 in)) in 1994 and later died during the 1996 blizzard on Everest while descending from the peak.

== Early life ==
Fischer was the son of Shirley and Gene Fischer and was of German, Dutch, and Hungarian ancestry. He spent his early life in Michigan and New Jersey. After watching a TV documentary in 1970 in his home in the Basking Ridge section of Bernards Township, New Jersey, about the National Outdoor Leadership School (NOLS) with his father, he headed to the Wind River Mountains of Wyoming for the summer. While attending Ridge High School, from which he graduated in 1973, he spent his summers in the mountains with NOLS, eventually becoming a full-time senior NOLS instructor.

== Career ==
In 1977, Fischer attended an ice climbing seminar by Jeff Lowe in Utah. A group of climbers scaled the frozen Bridal Veil Falls in Provo Canyon. During the climb, Fischer began to climb solo on the near-vertical ice formation when his ice axe broke, leaving him stranded. The others managed to get him a new axe, but when he ascended again, the tool popped out and he fell hundreds of feet. He survived but injured his foot with his ice axe as he fell.

In 1984, Fischer and Wes Krause became the second-ever team to scale the Breach Icicle on Mount Kilimanjaro in Tanzania, East Africa after Reinhold Messner and Konrad Renzler in 1978. A few months later they came to Nepal for the autumn climbing season and tried to reach the Annapurna Fang because of its cheap permit and total cost. On descending, Krause was injured but both survived.

That same year Fischer and two friends, Wes Krause and Michael Allison, each chipped in $500 and founded Mountain Madness, an adventure travel service (soon after Allison moved to Atlanta and sold them his share). Fischer and Krause guided clients in climbing major mountain peaks worldwide, but later Krause, who lived in Kenya, focused his efforts on Africa (Kilimanjaro route and safaris.

In the summer of 1986, Fischer, Krause, and Robert Birkby went to Soviet Union and reached Elbrus (Caucasus Mountains). Fischer and Krause also tried to summit Ushba but failed. Later Fischer and Birkby made “a walk” to Ushba: while descending the icefall Fischer fell into a crevasse, dragging his friend along. Birkby was able to anchor with his ice ax, ensuring their safety. That same year Fischer and Krause organized another group to reach the highest mountain in the Soviet Union, Communism Peak (Pamir). They reached the summit together with Stacy Allison, the best of many of Fischer’s students. One climber of the team fell sick in a lower camp; Fischer and Krause tried to evacuate him, but unfortunately he died on the slope.

In the autumn of 1987, Fischer and Krause organized a trip to China, trying to reach Mount Everest from Tibet via the Northern Wall. To finance their own climbs, they usually organized base camp trekking trips for clients of Mountain Madness, so Fischer’s mother Shirley was in Everest base camp (probably the first time in Mount Everest history a climber was with his mother). Fischer, Krause, Stacy Allison, and Samuel Belk had spent four nights in Camp IV waiting for weather but were forced to go down because of strong wind and snowfalls.

Returning to Seattle, Fischer had sent two resumes to the 1988 American Everest expedition (South route): Allison's and his own. He persuaded her at least to go for an interview. As a result, he was rejected but Allison was invited to join the team. Consequently, in 1988 she went to Nepal and became the first American woman to reach the summit of Mount Everest. Fischer was trekking to Kala Patthar and they met each other at the Everest base camp.

In 1990, Fischer and Wally Berg became the first Americans to summit Lhotse (27,940 ft / 8,516 m), the world's fourth-highest peak, as a part of Glenn Porzak's Everest — Lhotse expedition. At EBC he met Rob Hall, Gary Ball, Peter Hillary, and Tim Macartney-Snape. All of them made a summit on the same day as Porzak‘s team. Fischer and Berg were in Camp III ready for their Lhotse attempt, but first had to go up to the Yellow Band in order to evacuate their teammate Mike Brauning from the South Col into Camp II. The next morning they returned to Camp III and, after a short rest, advanced to camp IV. The next morning on May 13, they reached the summit. Fischer was upset with the achievement as his real goal was Everest, but being a few days off schedule he did not have the time nor resources for it. Additionally, no one was on the Everest slopes at the time to help ensure the ropes and ladders installed by the Nepali Army Everest team on the Khumbu Icefall for the 1990 climbing season had not been removed.

In 1992, during the climb on K2 as a part of a Russian-American expedition, Fischer fell into a crevasse and tore the rotator cuff of his right shoulder. Against his doctor's advice, Fischer spent two weeks trying to recover and asked climbing partner Ed Viesturs to tape his shoulder and tether it to his waist so it would not continue to dislocate. He then resumed the climb using only his left arm. On their first summit bid, the climbers abandoned their attempt at Camp III to rescue Aleskei Nikiforov, Thor Keiser, and Chantal Mauduit. Fischer, Viesturs, and Charley Mace reached the summit on their second attempt without supplemental oxygen. During their descent, they met climbers Rob Hall and Gary Ball, who were suffering from altitude sickness at Camp II. Hall's health improved along the descent, but Ball required subsequent help from Fischer and the other climbers to reach the base of the mountain.

Through Mountain Madness, Fischer guided the 1993 Climb for the Cure on Denali (20,320 ft) in Alaska which eight students at Princeton University organized. The expedition raised $280,000 for the American Foundation for AIDS Research. In 1994, Fischer and Rob Hess climbed Mount Everest without supplemental oxygen. They also formed a part of the expedition that removed 5,000 pounds of trash and 150 discarded oxygen bottles from Everest. With the climb, Fischer had climbed the top of the highest peaks on six of the seven continents, except Vinson Massif in Antarctica. The American Alpine Club awarded the David Brower Conservation Award to all expedition members. In January 1996, Fischer and Mountain Madness guided a fundraising ascent of Mount Kilimanjaro (19,341 ft / 5,895 m) in Tanzania.

== Death ==
In May 1996, Fischer guided eight clients in climbing Everest. He was assisted by Anatoli Boukreev, Neal Beidleman, and eight Sherpas, led by Lopsang Jangbu Sherpa. On May 6, the Mountain Madness team left Base Camp (5,364 meters) for their summit climb. At Camp II (6,400 m), Fischer learned that his friend Dale Kruse was ill and could not make it out of Camp I (6,000 m). Fischer descended from Camp II, met with Kruse, and continued to Base Camp with him. Leaving Kruse at Base Camp, he ascended to rejoin his team at Camp II. He was slow on ascent to Camp III (7,200 m) the following day, and on May 9, he left Camp III for Camp IV at the South Col (7,950 m). On May 10, Fischer reached the summit after 3:45 PM, much later than the safe turnaround time of 2:00 PM due to his team climbing much slower than expected. He was exhausted from previous efforts and the ascent and became increasingly ill, possibly suffering from HAPE, HACE, or a combination of both.

His climbing partner, Lopsang Jangbu Sherpa, descended part of the way with him when a blizzard started. Near the Southeast ridge balcony (8,400 m), Fischer asked Lopsang to descend without him and send back Boukreev for help. After the storm subsided, on May 11, two Sherpas reached Fischer and "Makalu" Gau Ming-Ho, leader of a Taiwanese expedition. Fischer was unresponsive, and the Sherpas placed an oxygen mask over his face before carrying Gau to Camp IV. After rescuing other people, Boukreev finally reached Fischer, who was already dead. He described Fischer as having exhibited paradoxical undressing, commonly associated with hypothermia. "His oxygen mask is around face, but bottle is empty. He is not wearing mittens; hands completely bare. Down suit is unzipped, pulled off his shoulder, one arm is outside clothing. There is nothing I can do. Scott is dead." Boukreev shrouded Fischer's upper torso and moved his body off the main climbing route. His body remains on the mountain.

Lopsang Jangbu Sherpa died in an avalanche in the autumn of 1996, also on an expedition to Everest, and Boukreev died in December 1997 in an avalanche on an expedition to Annapurna. Fischer's climbing firm Mountain Madness was bought in 1997 by Keith and Christine Boskoff.

== Personal life ==
In 1981, Fischer married Jeannie Price, who was his student on a NOLS Mountaineering Course in 1974. They moved to Seattle in 1982 where they had two children, Andy and Katie Rose Fischer-Price.

== Legacy ==
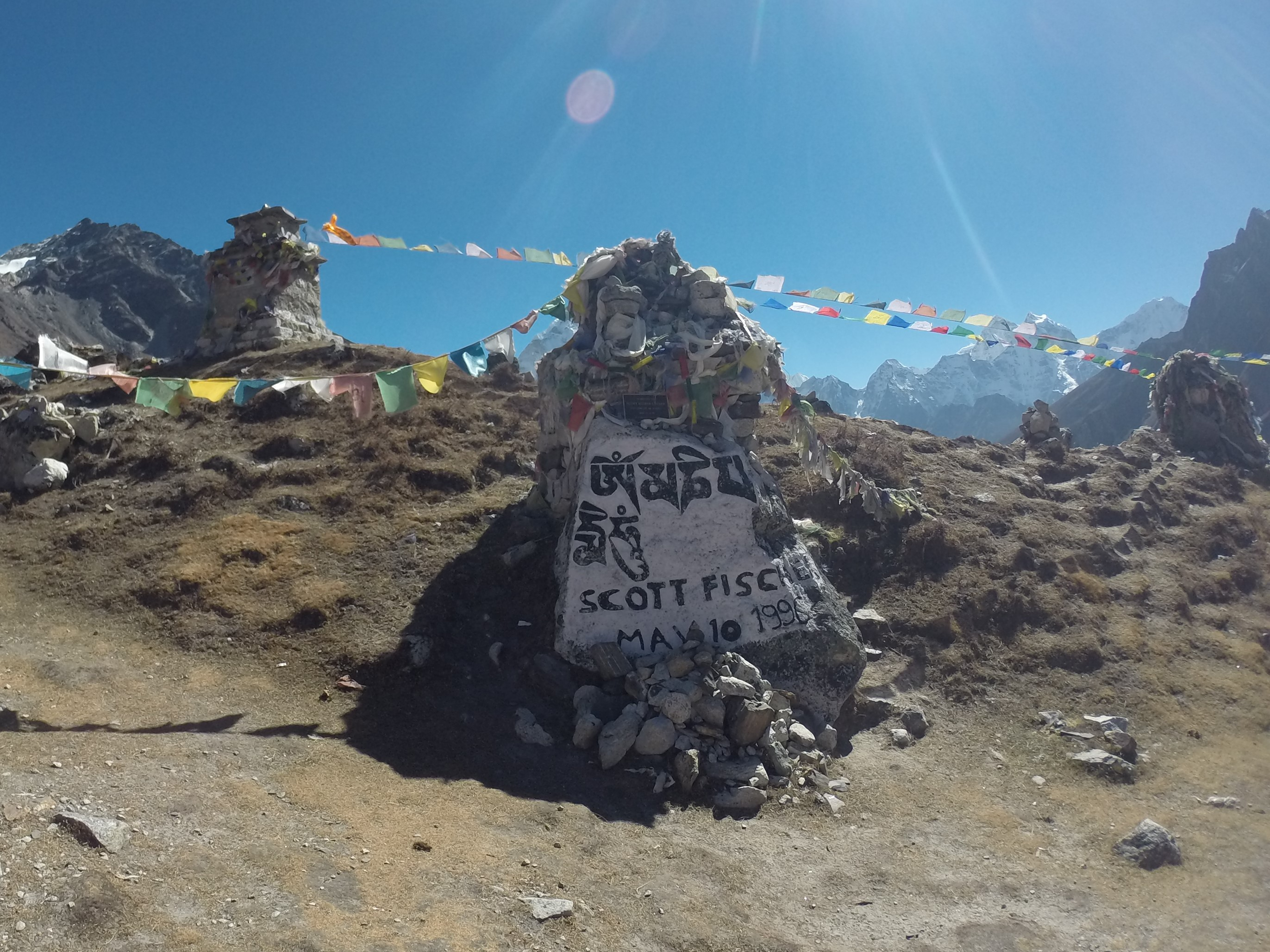
This memorial to Fischer sits on an open plateau outside the village of Dughla in the Khumbu Valley, a day's walk from Everest Base Camp.

- A memorial stupa for Fischer was built by the Sherpas in 1996 outside the village of Dughla in the Solukhumbu District of Nepal. In 1997, Ingrid Hunt, the doctor who had accompanied the 1996 Mountain Madness Everest Expedition to Base Camp, returned to place a bronze memorial plaque on it in his honor.
- The American Alpine Club established the Scott Fischer Memorial Conservation Fund in his memory which helps environmentally proactive expeditions throughout the world.
- A route up Mount Kilimanjaro is dedicated to Fischer. A plaque in memory to Fischer is located along this route, known as the Western-Breach Route.

=== In popular culture ===
- In the 1997 TV movie Into Thin Air: Death on Everest, Fischer is portrayed by Peter Horton.
- In the 2015 film Everest, Fischer is portrayed by Jake Gyllenhaal.

== See also ==
- List of Mount Everest summiters by number of times to the summit
- List of people who died climbing Mount Everest
