= Woodburn bank bombing =

2008 explosion in Oregon, US

- Location: 45.15074°N 122.87423°W; Woodburn, Oregon, United States
- Date: December 12, 2008
- Attack type: Bombing, attempted extortion
- Weapon: Explosive device
- Deaths: 2
- Injuries: 2
- Perpetrators: Bruce and Joshua Turnidge
- Motive: Ransom, antigovernment beliefs

The Woodburn bank bombing was a bomb explosion that occurred on December 12, 2008, when a bomb that had been moved by a bomb squad technician into the West Coast Bank in Woodburn, Oregon, United States, exploded, killing two officers and seriously injuring a third.

== Bombing ==
On December 12, 2008, a phone call to the Wells Fargo bank in Woodburn, Oregon, was answered by 22-year-old teller Karen Valadez. A voice she later identified as that of Joshua Turnidge stated, "If you value your life and the life of your employees, you need to get out because I am going to kill you." The caller then instructed her and the others in the bank to leave and go to an area outside, where they would find a cellphone that he would use to contact them with and provide further information. He added that he was contacting another nearby bank, West Coast Bank. Valadez waved over her manager, who told her to hang up; she disconnected the call and repeated its contents to her manager. The bank contacted the police shortly afterward.

The police swept Wells Fargo, found nothing, and then proceeded to investigate West Coast Bank with no results. The police left the scene but were called back when an employee noticed a suspicious device outside. Oregon State Police Senior Trooper and munitions expert William Hakim examined the device. As rain fell, Hakim decided to carry it into the West Coast Bank to dismantle it. Inside the bank, with two bank employees still inside, Hakim began to examine the green box, trying to discern whether it was an explosive device or not. Shortly after he had begun examining it, an explosion occurred, killing him and Woodburn Police Captain Tom Tennant. Woodburn Police Chief Scott Russell had one leg completely blown off by the blast and was bleeding profusely from the other when Detective Nick Wilson and Officer John Mikkola, who were both investigating at the other bank, rushed in. Wilson was able to save Russell from bleeding to death by using his belt as a tourniquet on Russell's leg.

== Investigation and arrests ==
Two hundred sixty-five investigators from multiple agencies were assigned to work on the case. Investigators found a cellphone outside at the scene, which was concluded to have been the one mentioned by Joshua Turnidge in the first call. The phone was traced back to a Walmart, where surveillance videos showed a man purchasing the phone and later driving away in a blue truck. A partial license plate identification showed the truck was owned by Bruce Turnidge of Jefferson, Oregon. While Turnidge was not the man in the video, further investigation found a record of the truck being stopped for a traffic violation while driven by Turnidge's son Joshua, who matched the recorded image. Two days after the explosion, Joshua, age 32, was arrested at his home in Salem. Several hours later, Bruce Turnidge, age 57, was arrested at his home.

== Perpetrators ==
Bruce and Joshua Turnidge were construction workers who had maintained a close, if sometimes rocky, relationship since Joshua was a young boy. Bruce had maintained 2nd Amendment rights and conservative Christian views for many years. Joshua joined the U.S. Navy at the age of 21 but received a medical discharge after a Navy psychologist stated that he was a danger to himself and others. Joshua later stated that he had faked his symptoms to ensure his discharge when he learned he had gotten a woman pregnant. The Turnidges both held numerous jobs, including owning a farm, and had decided to start a biodiesel company together, collecting cooking oil from restaurants for recycling. By the time of the bombing, the business was in debt and having trouble paying its rent.

== Trial, convictions, and sentences ==
The trial lasted more than two months, and more than 100 witnesses were called. Prosecutors brought forth the Turnidges' financial difficulties, anti-government beliefs, and fear that the then-new Obama administration would take away their guns. A friend of Joshua Turnidge testified that Turnidge often confided in him about a plan to obtain money from a bank using a bomb. During the trial, both defendants attempted to put the majority of the blame on the other, with Bruce's attorneys stating that his lack of computer skills and physical ailments would have prevented him from carrying out a role in the plot, while Joshua testified that he didn't know why his father had taken him for a drive that day and didn't know what happened until his father told him that "no one was supposed to get hurt." The defense also claimed the deaths would have never happened if Hakim did not set off the bomb by allegedly hitting it with a hammer and prying it open with a crowbar.

The prosecution theorized that a stray radio signal had set off the device, not Hakim's actions. It took less than five hours of deliberations for the jury to find both Turnidges guilty on all eighteen counts, including aggravated murder. Following a sentencing recommendation from the jury, the judge sentenced both men to death. The jurors cited a lack of remorse as a reason for deciding on the sentencing recommendation.

In 2016, the convictions and sentences were upheld by the Oregon Supreme Court. On December 13, 2022, Governor Kate Brown commuted the death sentences of Bruce and Joshua Turnidge to life without parole. Everyone else on Oregon's death row received the same commutation.

== Aftermath ==
Police Chief Scott Russell required fifty-five plus surgeries but was able to return to work after receiving a prosthetic leg. He retired in 2016.
