= Varaha Shikhar =

Mountain in Nepal

- Annapurna Fang
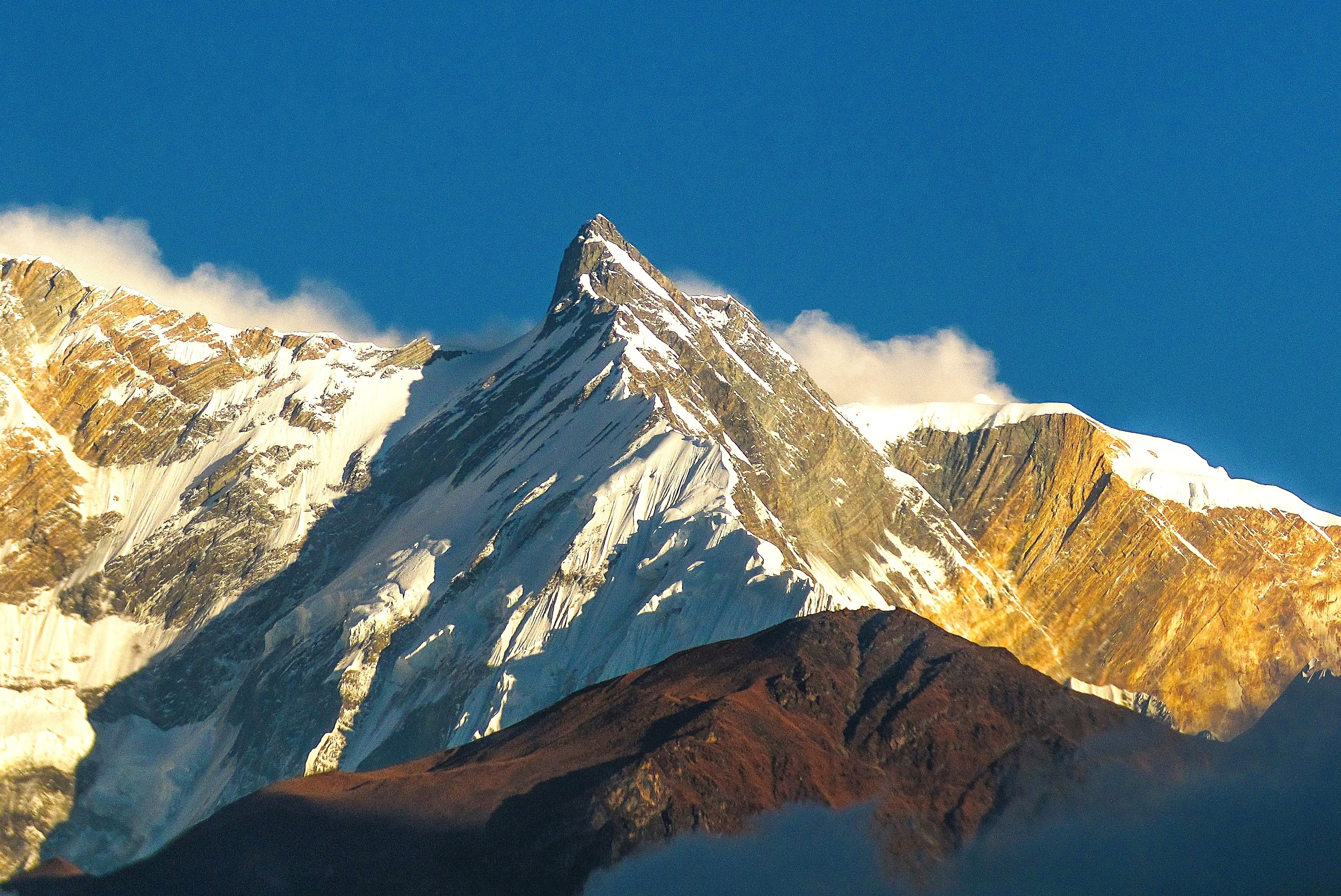
- Fang seen from below the West Ridge

Highest point
- Elevation: 7,647 m (25,089 ft)
- Prominence: 445 m (1,460 ft)
- Parent peak: Annapurna I
- Isolation: 1.2 km (0.75 mi)
- Coordinates: 28°34′41″N 83°48′12″E

Geography
- Location within Nepal
- Interactive map of Varaha Shikhar
- Country: Nepal
- Province: Gandaki
- District: Myagdi / Kaski
- Protected area: Annapurna Conservation Area
- Parent range: Annapurna Himal

Climbing
- First ascent: 1980 (West Ridge)

Varaha Shikhar, better known internationally as Annapurna Fang, is a mountain in the Annapurna Himal of Nepal. The peak is also known as Baraha Shikhar, Bharhā Chuli̇̄, and Fang.

== Features ==
Varaha Shikhar is a 7,647-metre (25,089-foot) summit in the Annapurna Himal of the Nepalese Himalayas, situated 40 kilometres (25 mi) north-northwest of Pokhara in Gandaki Province. It is the westernmost summit on the main ridge of the range, seated on the Southwest Ridge of Annapurna.

While it is the third-highest named summit of the Annapurna massif and of the Annapurna Conservation Area, its modest prominence and omission from the numbered summits in the Annapurna range mean it is much more obscure than other peaks.

Precipitation runoff from the mountain's west slope drains to the Kali Gandaki, whereas the east slope drains into headwaters of the Modi River.

Although there are some mountain walls of comparable size with a steeper topographic relief in less distance, its Southwest Face has perhaps the greatest vertical rise from its base of any such face in the world: It rises 4,450 metres (14,600 ft) above the Kali Gandaki gorge in only four kilometres (2.5 mi).

== Climate ==
Based on the Köppen climate classification, Varaha Shikhar is located in a tundra climate zone with cold, snowy winters, and cool summers. Weather systems are forced upwards by the Himalaya mountains (orographic lift), causing heavy precipitation in the form of rainfall and snowfall. Mid-June through early-August is the monsoon season. The months of March, April, October, and November offer the most favorable weather for viewing or climbing this peak.

== Climbing ==
The first ascent of the summit was achieved on May 17, 1980, by Austrians Sepp Mayerl and Hermann Neumair, along with Ang Chopal Sherpa of Nepal. In 1984 the team of Scott Fischer made an attempt as the price of a permit was the cheapest in the region, but was forced to retreat due to severe conditions. The second ascent was made on November 29, 2007, by Park Soo Seok, Siting Sherpa, and Wangdi Sherpa via the east face and south ridge. As of 2022, these are the only successful climbs out of nine attempts, and there have been three fatalities in that time.

== See also ==
- Geology of the Himalayas

== Gallery ==
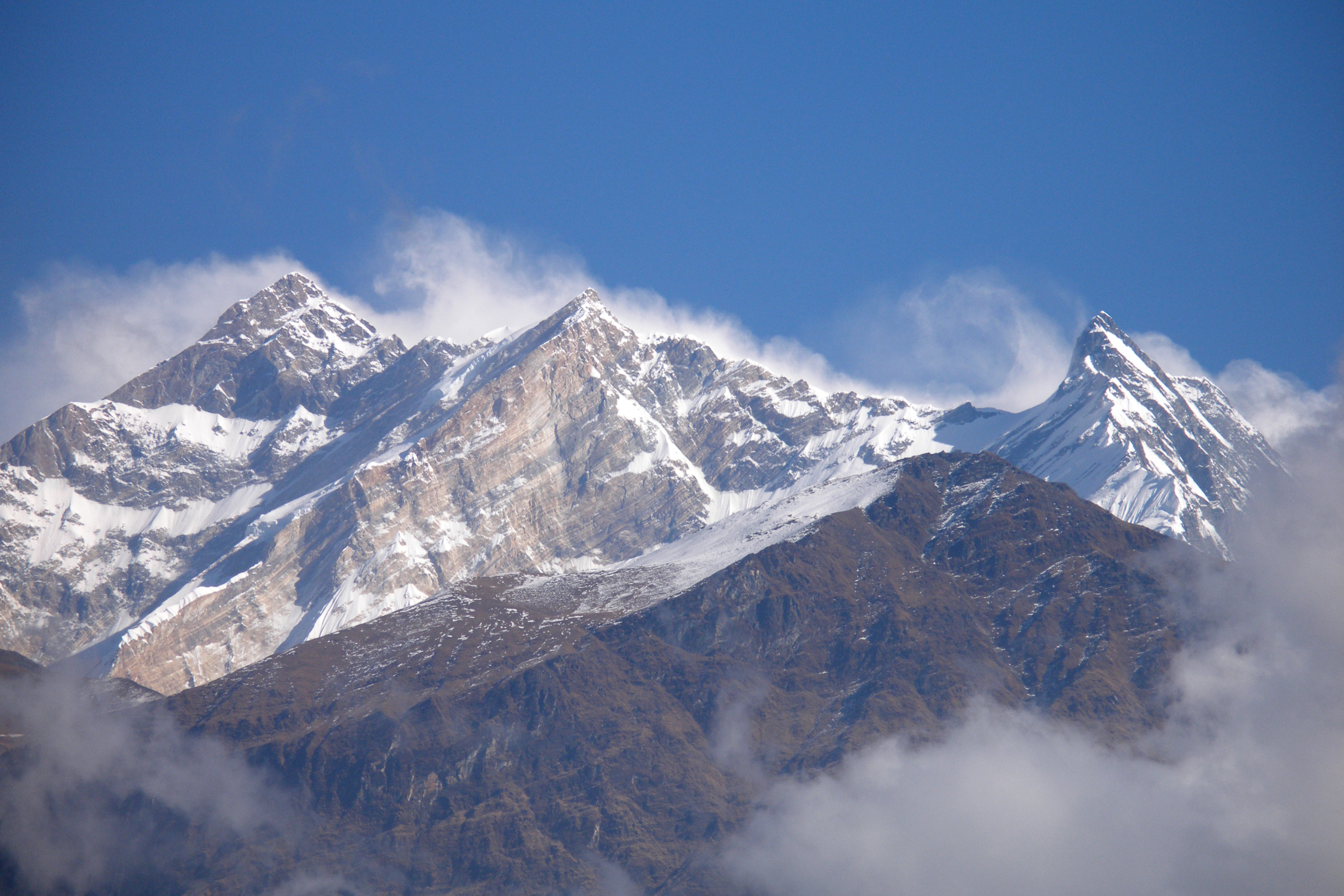
Fang to the right with Annapurna I to left

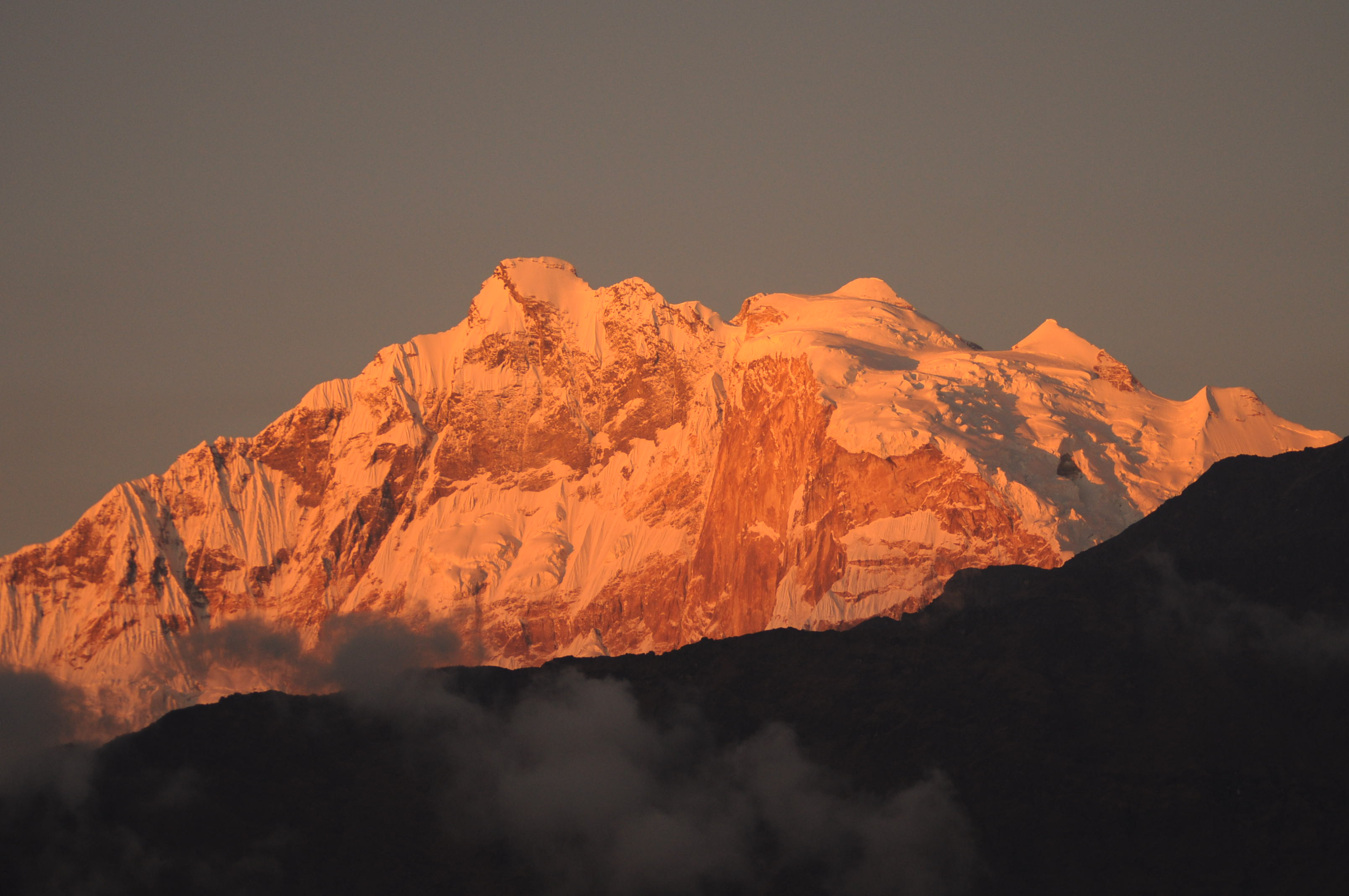
Southwest face

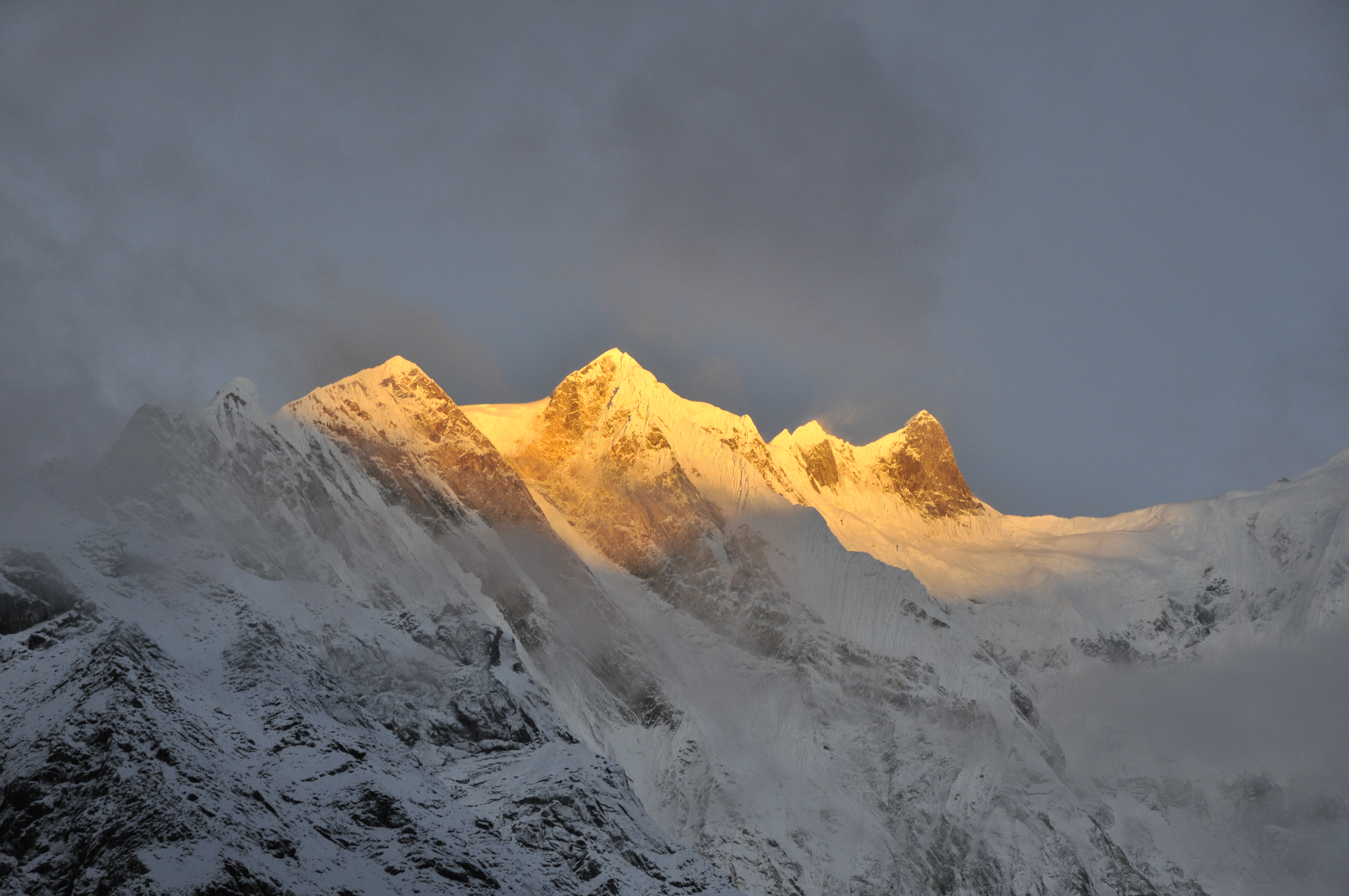
Southeast aspect

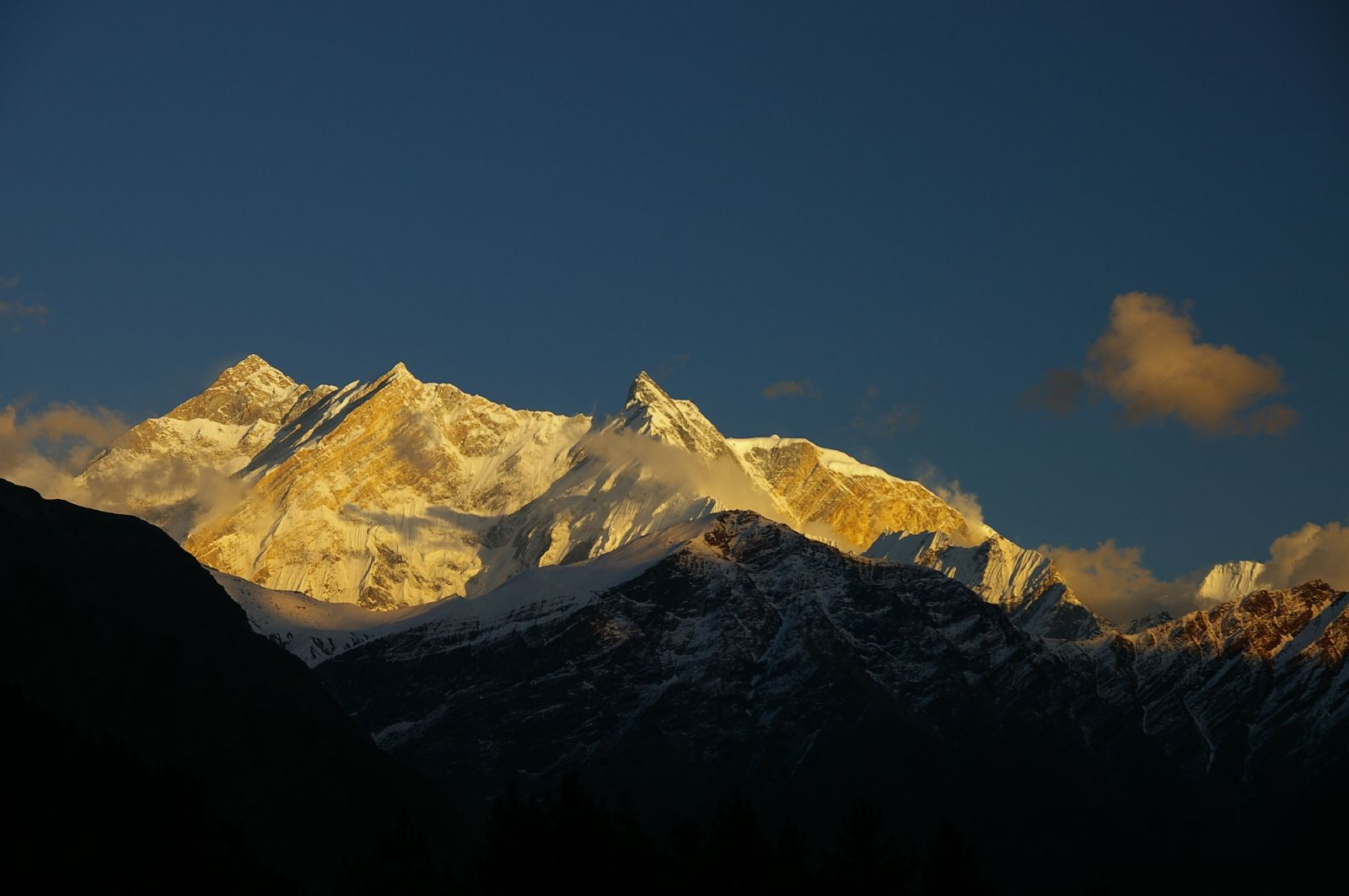
Sun setting over Fang and Annapurna

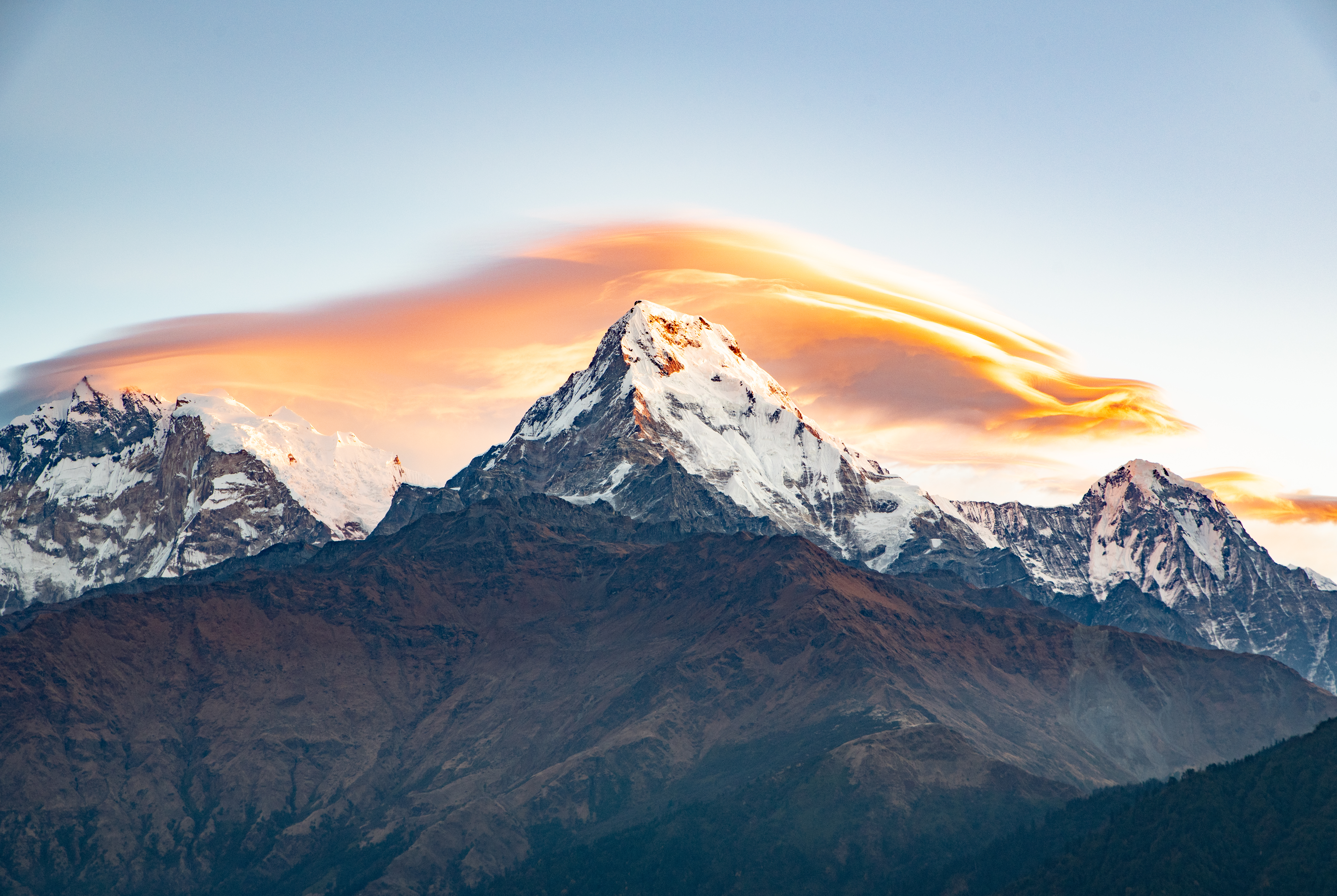
Annapurna Fang to left, Annapurna South centered

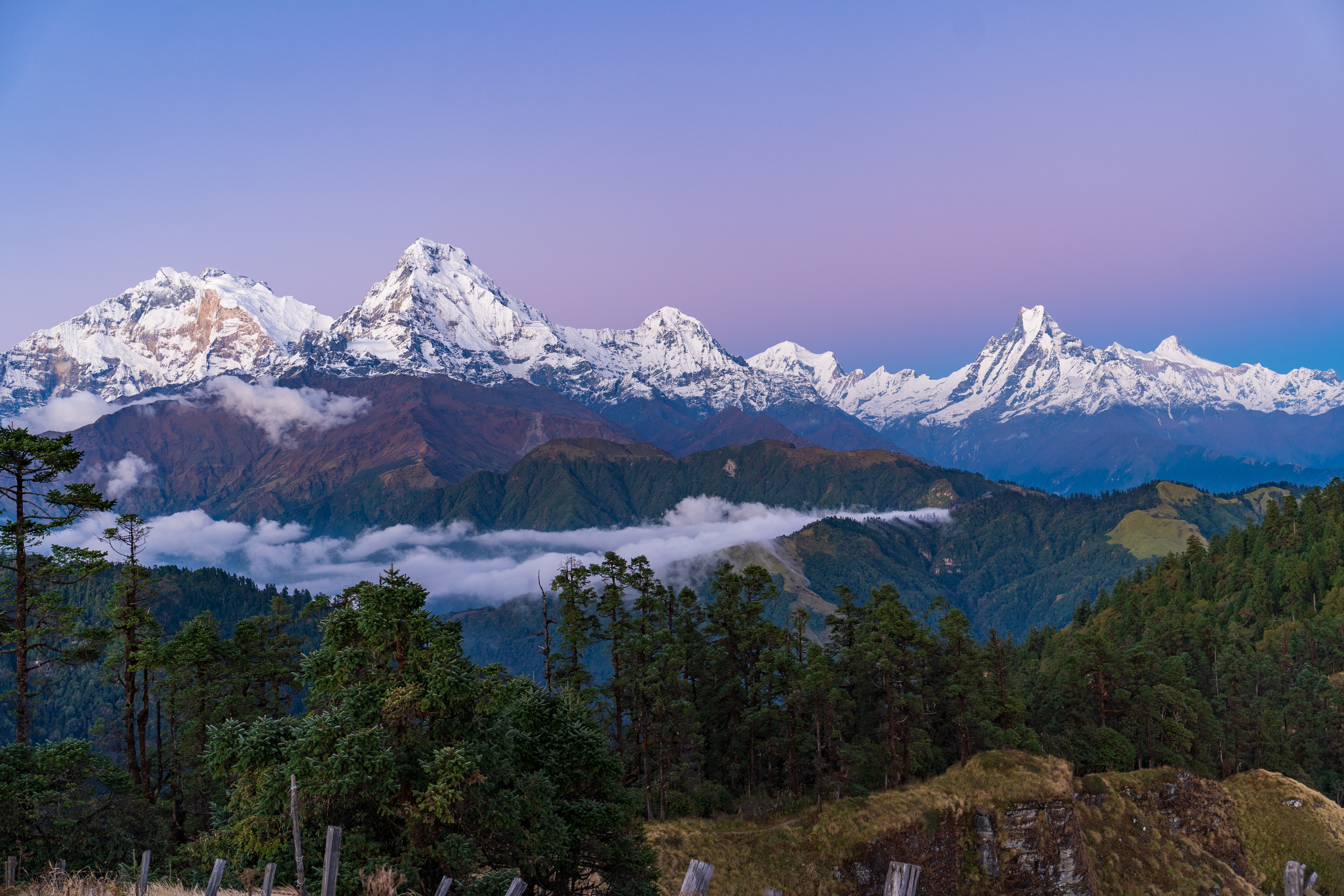
Varaha Shikhar is the peak furthest to left

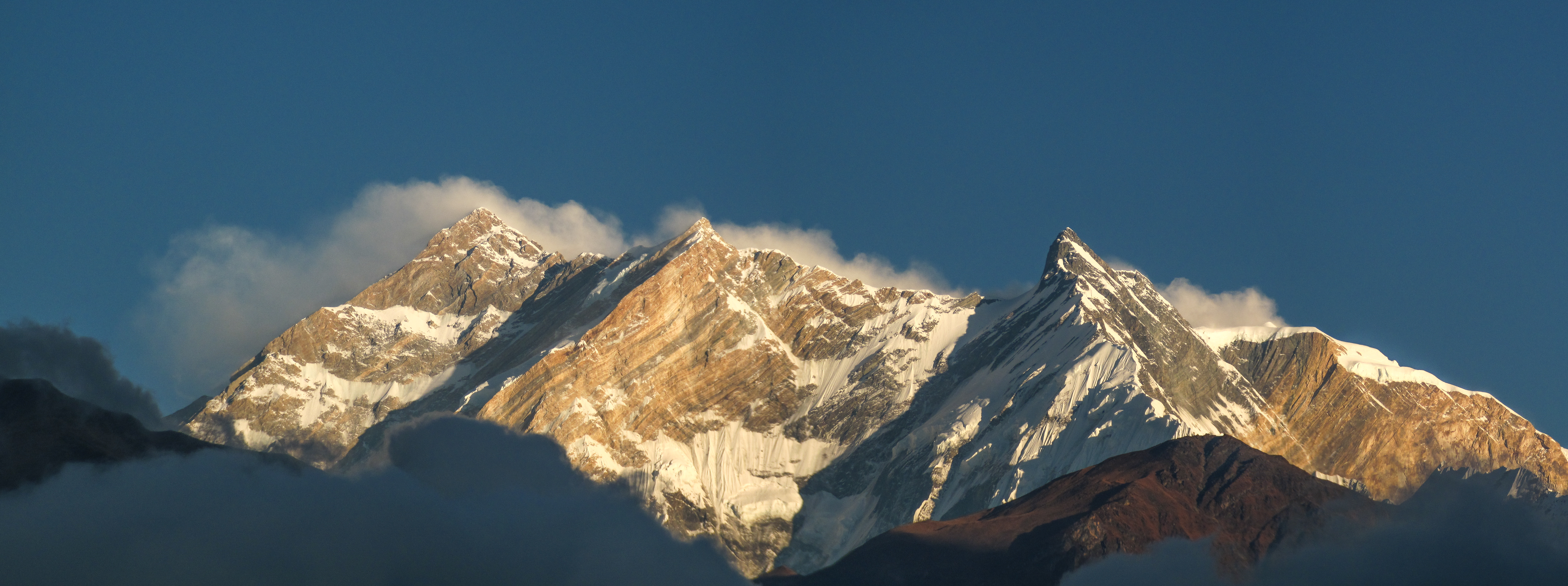
Annapurna I to left with Fang to the right

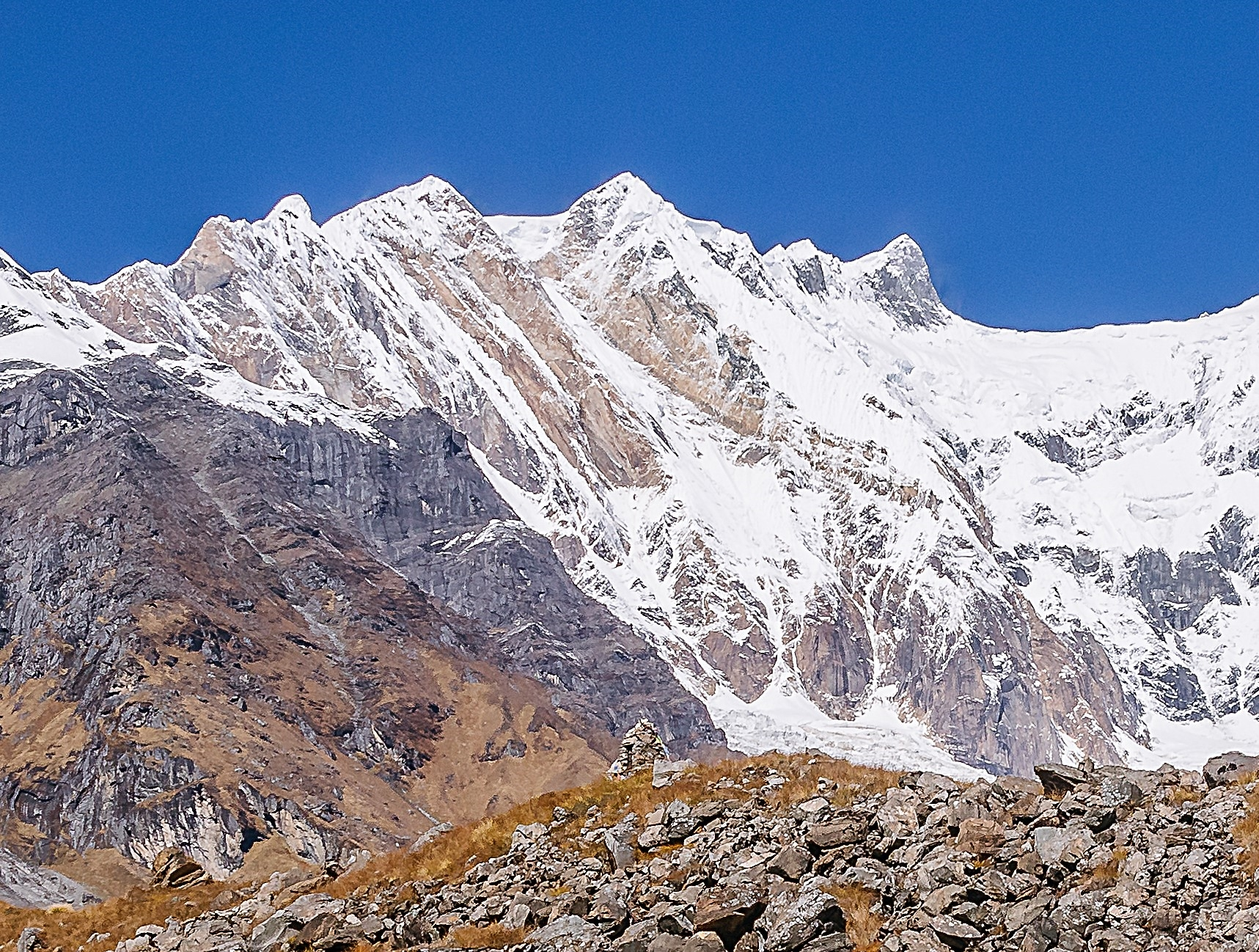
Southeast aspect

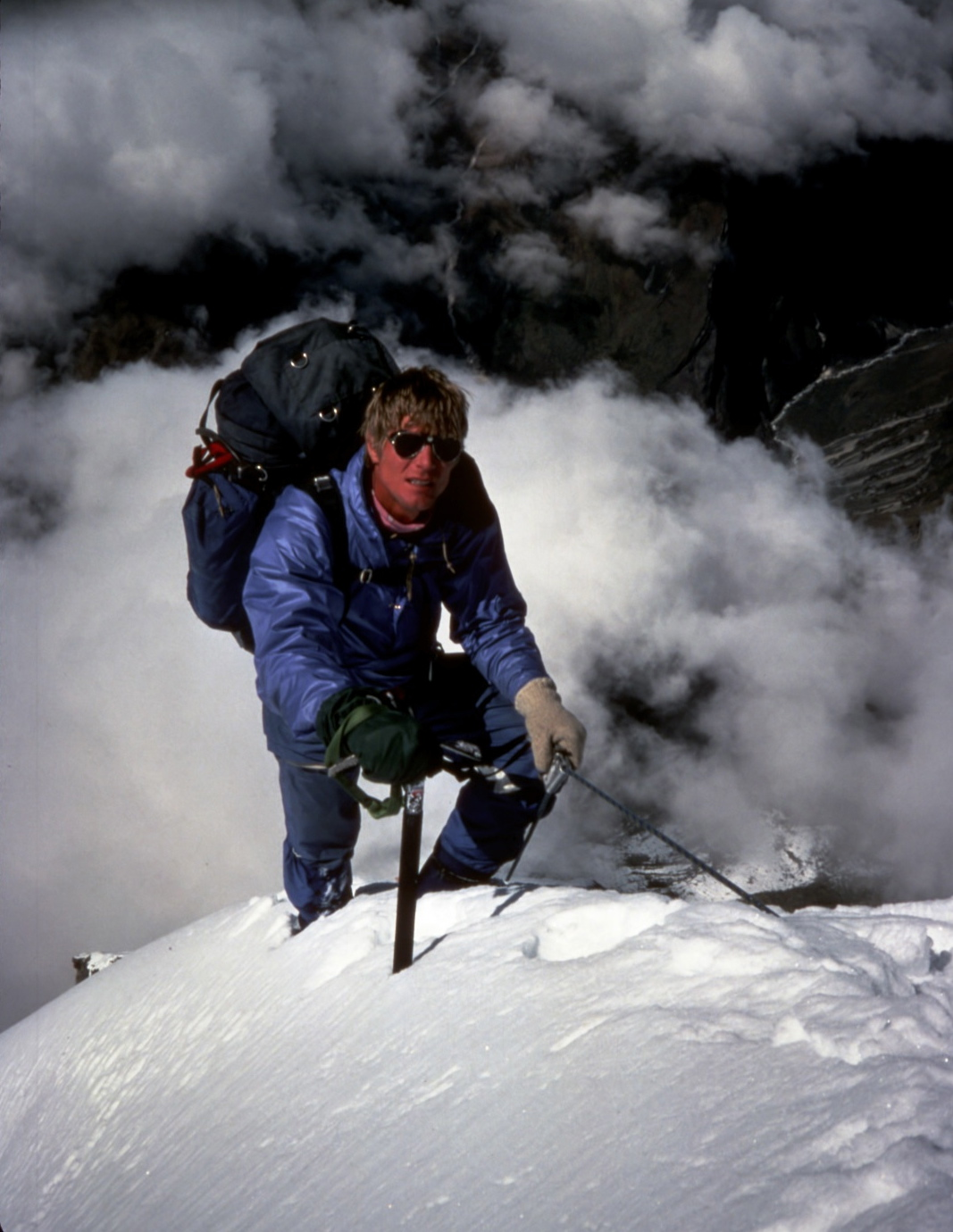
Scott Fischer on the Fang in 1984
