= KPCN-LP =

Shared-time with KPVN-LP

Woodburn, Oregon; United States
- Frequency: 95.9 MHz
- Branding: Radio Movimiento (Movement Radio)

Programming
- Format: Spanish Variety

Ownership
- Owner: Pineros y Campesinos Unidos del Noroeste

History
- First air date: August 20, 2006
- Last air date: November 20, 2019
- Former frequencies: 96.3 MHz
- Call sign meaning: Pineros y Campesinos Unidos del Noroeste

Technical information
- Licensing authority: FCC
- Facility ID: 133049
- Class: L1
- ERP: 31 watts
- HAAT: 53 meters (174 feet)
- Transmitter coordinates: 45°08′29″N 122°51′21″W

Links
- Public license information: LMS
- Website: pcun.org

KPCN-LP (95.9 FM, "Radio Movimiento") was a low-power FM radio station licensed to serve Woodburn, Oregon, United States. The station, launched in 2006, was last owned by Pineros y Campesinos Unidos del Noroeste ("Northwest Treeplanters and Farmworkers United").

KPCN-LP station aired a Spanish-language variety radio format. The station targets its programming at the special interests of farm workers.

The station shared its program hours with KPVN-LP, a similar station owned by the Centro de Servicios para Campesinos ("Farmworkers' Service Center"). That station surrendered its license in a letter dated December 20, 2019, a month after KPCN-LP ceased operations.

== History ==
This station received its original construction permit from the Federal Communications Commission on May 17, 2005. The new station was assigned the KPCN-LP call sign by the FCC on June 13, 2005. KPCN-LP received its license to cover from the FCC on November 28, 2006.

On April 1, 2008, the station applied to the FCC for authorization to move from their licensed broadcast frequency of 96.3 MHz to 95.9 MHz. On the same day, they applied for special temporary authority to broadcast on the lower frequency. While as of September 7, 2009, the Commission has only accepted the authorization request for filing, they granted KPCN-LP the special temporary authority they sought on August 25, 2008, with a scheduled expiration date of February 25, 2009. On that expiration date, the station filed for an extension of their special temporary authority but as of September 7, 2009, the Commission has only accepted this extension request for filing. It made its final broadcast on November 20, 2019, and its license was canceled on August 21, 2020, having been supplanted by the higher-power KTUP (98.3 FM).

== See also ==
- List of community radio stations in the United States
