= Woodburn Success Alternative High School =

Location
- 1316 Meridian Street; Woodburn, Marion County, Oregon 97071; United States; 45.139405°N 122.851959°W

Information
- Type: Public
- School district: Woodburn School District
- Principal: Laurie Cooper
- Grades: 9-12
- Enrollment: 184
- Website: SAHS website
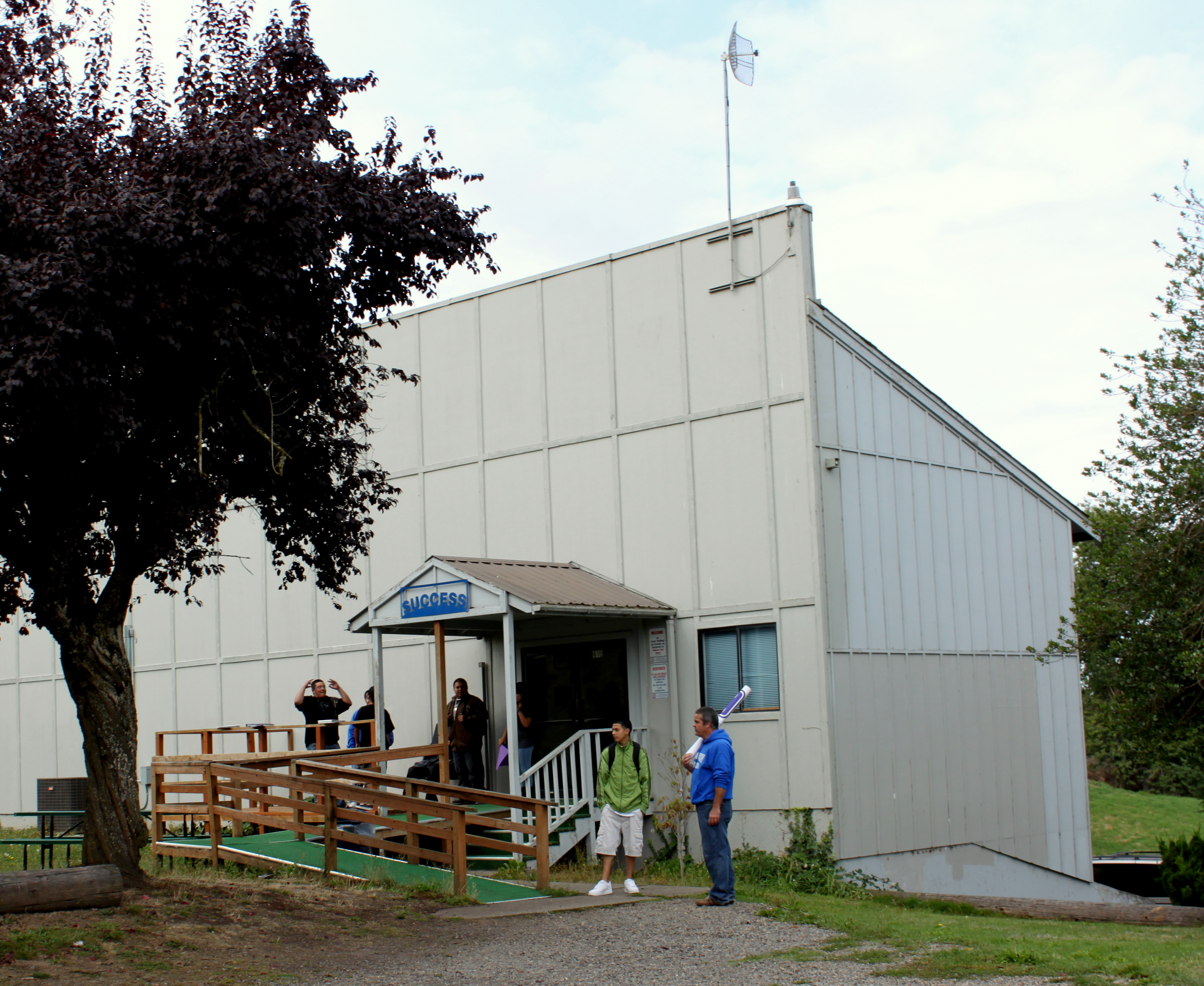

Woodburn Success Alternative High School, also known as Woodburn Success School, is a public alternative high school in Woodburn, Oregon, United States.

== Academics ==
In 2008, 37% of the school's seniors received their high school diploma. Of 60 students, 22 graduated, 17 dropped out, and 21 are still in high school.
