= Stacy Allison =

American mountaineer (born 1958)

Stacy Allison (born 1958), raised in Woodburn, Oregon, is the first American woman to reach the summit of Mount Everest, the world's highest mountain, which she did on September 29, 1988.

== Biography ==
Stacy Allison began climbing during her time as a biology student at Oregon State University. Starting from late 1970s, she practiced the basics of mountaineering and had mastered her skills under the guidance of Scott Fischer. She attempted her first major climb at age 21 on Mount Huntington. Her climbing partner broke his ax only 200 feet from the top, and they were forced to turn around.

She continued climbing, and in 1986 went to Soviet Union with a group of climbers from Mountain Madness to climb Communism Peak (Pamir Mountains). She reached the summit together with Scott Fischer and Wesley Krause. One climber of the team felt sick in the lower camp; both Fischer and Wes tried to evacuate him, but the climber had unfortunately died at the slope.

Next autumn she joined the Mount Everest expedition from Tibet (northern wall) also organised by Mountain Madness. Trying to reach the summit Stacy, Scott, Wesley and Samuel Belk had spent four nights in Camp IV waiting for better weather, but were forced to go down because of strong wind and snowfalls.

Returning to Seattle, Scott has sent two resumes for the 1988 American Everest expedition (from the South): Stacy's and his own. He persuaded her at least to go for an interview. As a result, he was rejected, but Stacy was invited to join the team. Consequently, in 1988 Stacy went to Nepal and became the first American woman to reach the summit of Mount Everest. Scott was trekking to Kala Pathar and they met each other at the Everest base camp.

On September 29, Stacy successfully reached the summit. Three days later, On October 2, Peggy Luce Gudgell of the same team became a second American woman who reached the Everest summit.

In 1993, Stacy was a team leader of K2 attempt.

She was later part of a team that marked the first successful all-women ascent of Ama Dablam, a mountain of 22,495 ft.

She is the co-author with Peter Ames Carlin of Beyond the Limits: A Woman's Triumph on Everest and the author of Many Mountains to Climb: Reflections on Competence, Courage, and Commitment.

== See also ==
- List of 20th-century summiters of Mount Everest
