= Jesse H. Settlemier =

American nurseryman and public official (1840–1913)

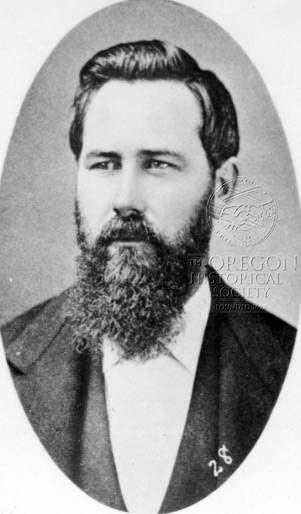
- Settlemier at 28 years old (1868)
- Born: Jesse Holland Settlemier; February 5, 1840; Alton, Illinois U.S.
- Died: February 20, 1913 (aged 73); Portland, Oregon, U.S.
- Resting place: Belle Passi Cemetery, Woodburn, Oregon
- Years active: 1863–1913
- Known for: Establishing one of the largest nursery businesses in the Pacific Northwest; Platting the townsite of Woodburn and developing its early economy; The historic Settlemier House
- Title: Founder and First Mayor of Woodburn, Oregon; Founder of the Woodburn Nursery Company
- Spouse: Eleanor C. Cochran (m. 1864)
- Children: 8, including Frank Settlemier
- Parent: George Settlemier (father)

Jesse Holland Settlemier (February 5, 1840 – February 20, 1913) was an American nurseryman and public official, best known as the founder of Woodburn, Oregon. He served as the first mayor of Woodburn as well as an Oregon state legislator.

== Early life and education ==
Born February 5, 1840, in Alton, Illinois, Settlemier traveled west with his family in 1849, enduring the difficult overland migration to California and then Oregon. He grew up working with fruit trees and nursery stock, a skill that shaped his entire career.

== Woodburn, Oregon ==
Settlemier purchased land in the Willamette Valley in 1863 and established the Woodburn Nursery, which grew into one of the largest nurseries on the West Coast, producing millions of plants annually. By 1871, he platted the first four blocks of what would become downtown Woodburn, donating land for businesses, churches, schools, and even 85 acres to railroad companies to ensure rail service through the town. Settlemier eventually served as Woodburn's first mayor (beginning in 1885), a delegate to state political conventions, and an Oregon state legislator for two terms starting in 1905.

== Settlemier House ==
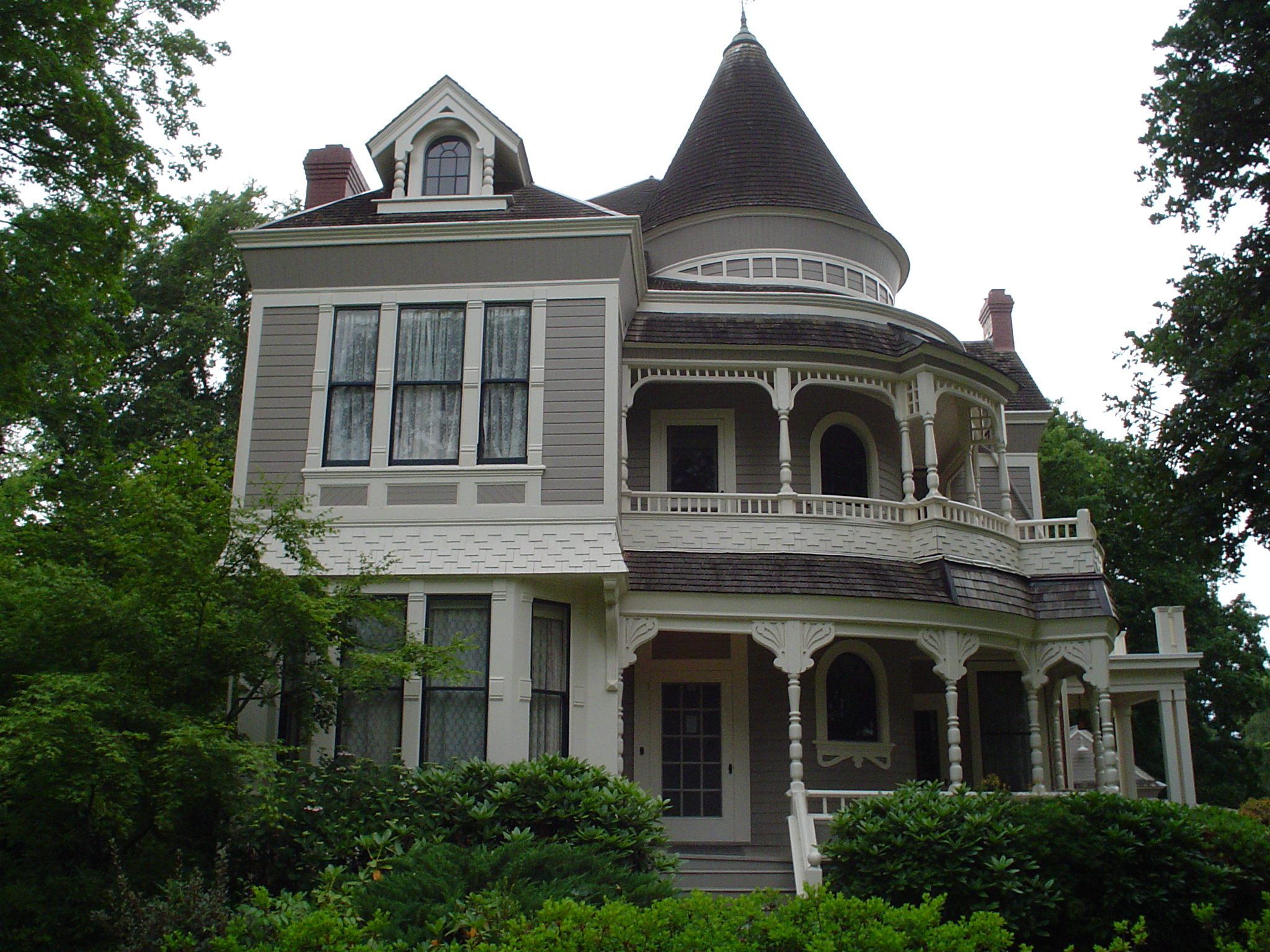
The Settlemier House

In 1891, he built a 12-room Queen Anne Victorian mansion—now known as the Settlemier House—celebrated as the “Grandest Mansion in Marion County.” It remains a historic landmark listed on the National Register of Historic Places.

By 1892, his nursery held about 3 million plants and earned nearly $60,000 in profit—a huge sum for the era. He was later inducted into the Oregon Nurserymen's Hall of Fame.

== Death ==
Settlemier died on February 20, 1913, in Portland, Oregon at the age of 73. Following his death, the town of Woodburn honored him with a grand funeral procession through the city streets. He was buried in the Belle Passi Cemetery.

== Personal life ==
Settlemier married three times and had eight children, seven (including eldest son Frank) with his first wife, Eleanor Cochran who died in January 1879; he married Clara S. Gray in December 1879 but she died shortly later from typhoid fever. He later married Mary C. Woodworth and they had one son, Jesse Jr. His eldest son Frank later took over the nursery operations.

== See also ==
- Woodburn, Oregon
- Jesse H. Settlemier House
