= Jesse H. Settlemier House =

Historic house in Oregon, United States

- U.S. National Register of Historic Places
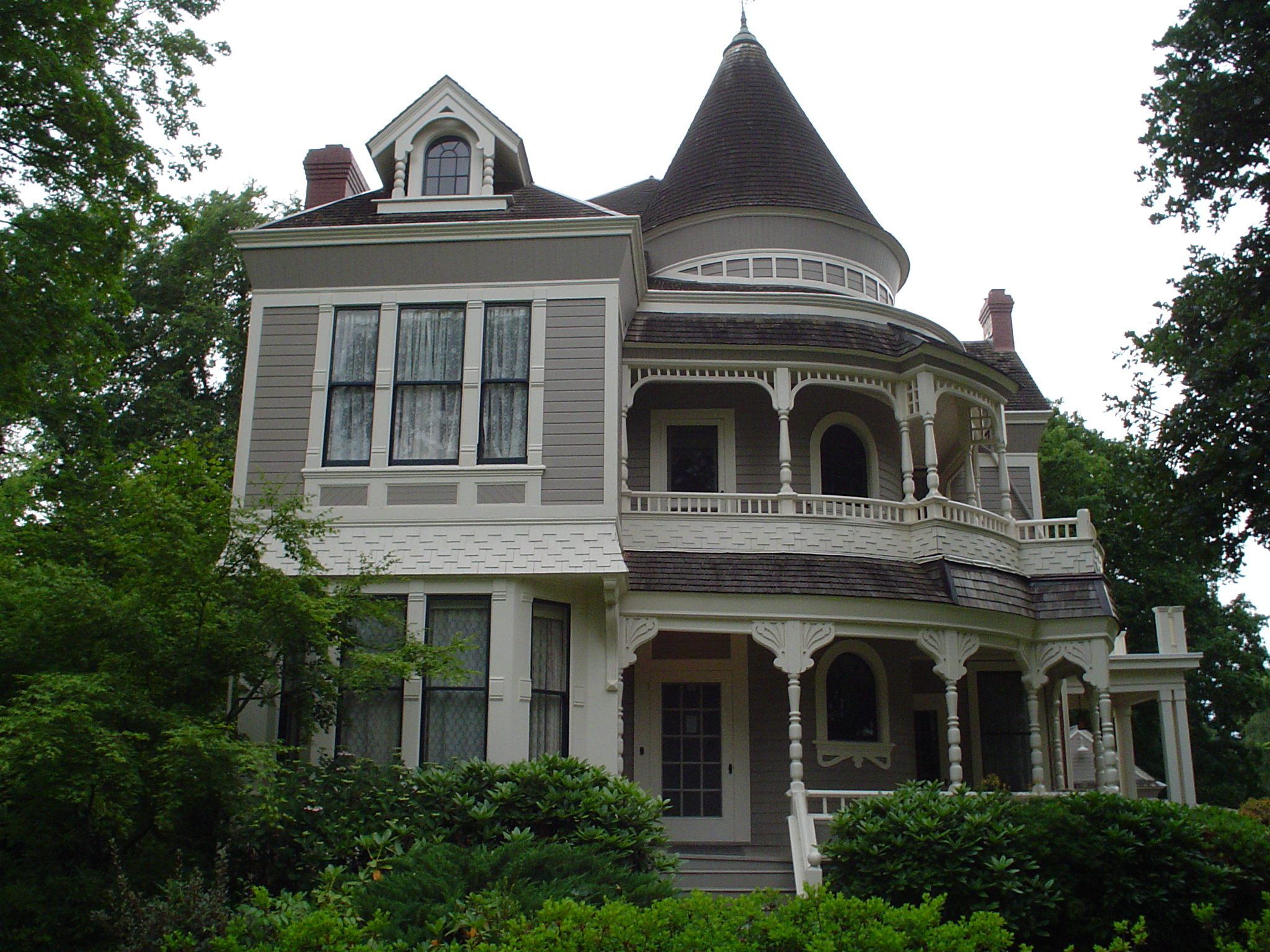

- Location within Oregon Location within the United States
- Location: 355 N. Settlemier Ave., Woodburn, Oregon
- Coordinates: 45°8′51″N 122°51′35″W
- Area: 1 acre (0.40 ha)
- Built: 1889
- Architectural style: Queen Anne
- NRHP reference No.: 74001704
- Added to NRHP: December 19, 1974

Jesse H. Settlemier House is a historic house in Woodburn, Oregon, United States. It was built by Jesse H. Settlemier, founder of Woodburn, in 1892. The house is no longer inhabited but is open to the public as a museum and as a location for special events such as weddings. The house is listed on the National Register of Historic Places.

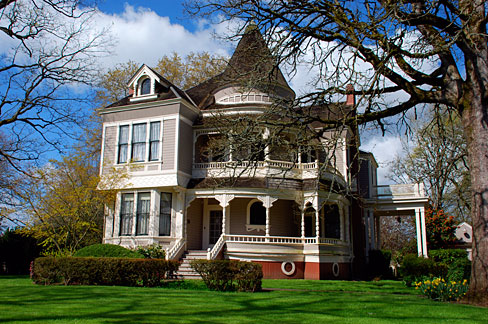
The house in 2011

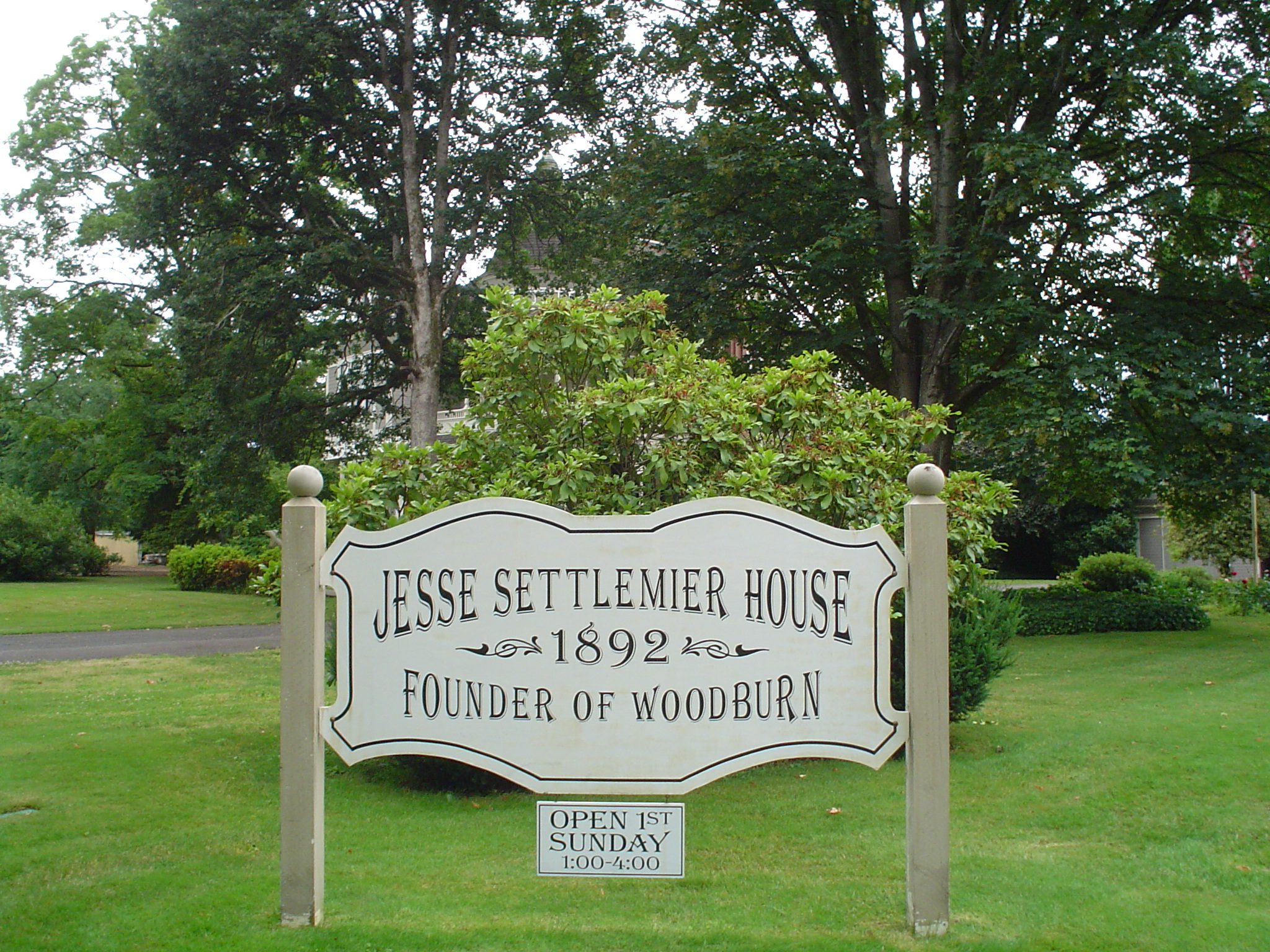
Sign for the house

== See also ==
- National Register of Historic Places listings in Marion County, Oregon
