= Woodburn, Oregon =

- City
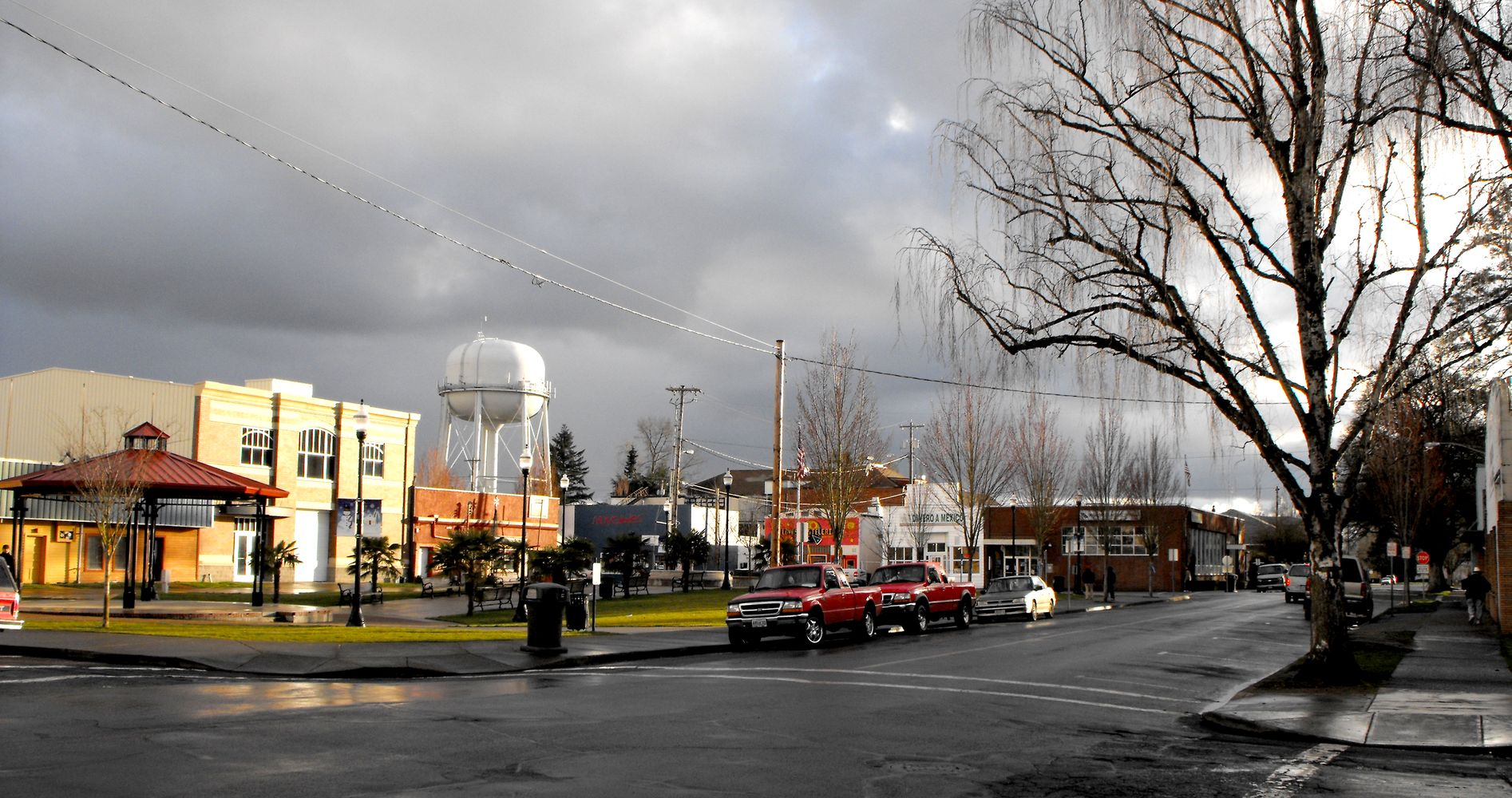
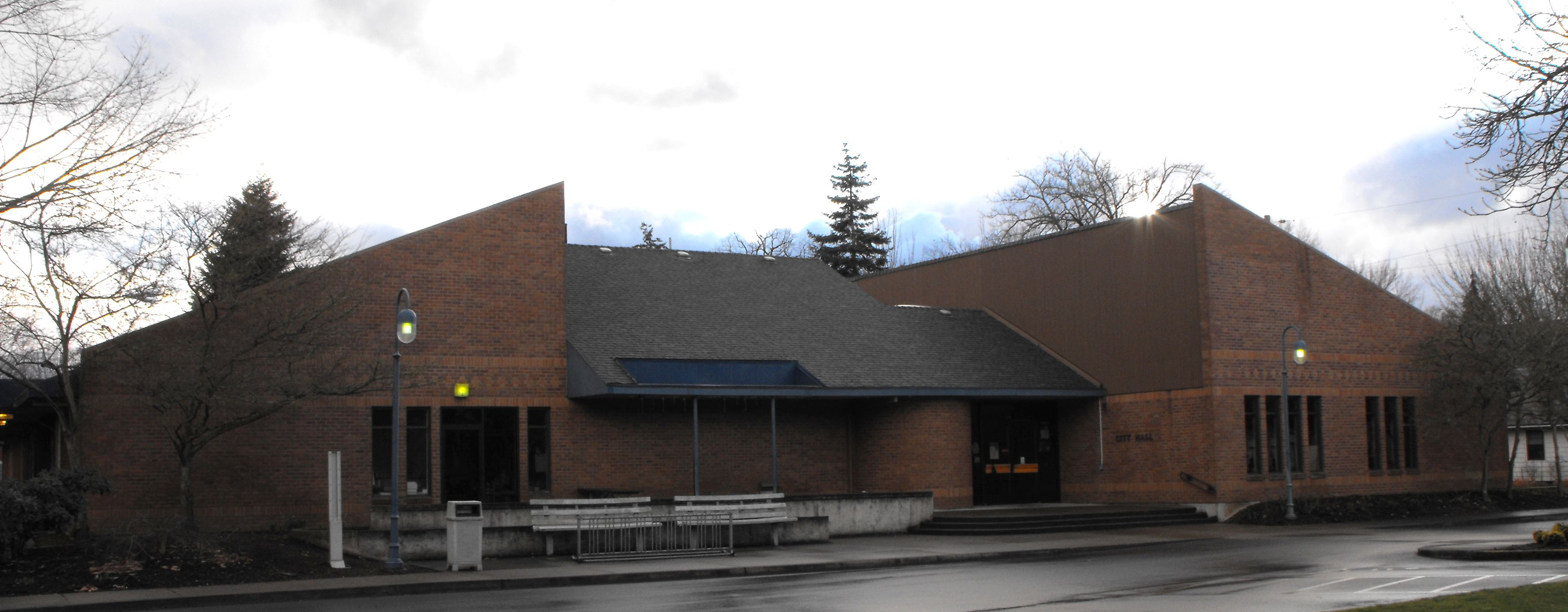
- Woodburn Square Woodburn City Hall

- Location of Woodburn, Oregon

- Location within Oregon Location within the United States
- Coordinates: 45.147152°N 122.861162°W
- Country: United States
- State: Oregon
- County: Marion
- Founded: 1863
- Platted: 1871
- Incorporated: 1889
- Founder: Jesse H. Settlemier

Government
  - Type: Council–manager
  - Mayor: Frank Lonergan
  - City Council: W1: Orlando Bravo; W2: Mark Wilk; W3: Jen Cantu; W4: Sharon Schaub; W5: Mary Beth Cornwell; W6: Alma Grijalva

Area
  - Total: 6.197 sq mi (16.050 km^{2})
  - Land: 6.197 sq mi (16.050 km^{2})
  - Water: 0 sq mi (0.000 km^{2}) 0.0%
- Elevation: 184 ft (56 m)

Population (2020)
  - Total: 26,013
  - Estimate (2024): 30,449
  - Density: 4,913.2/sq mi (1,897.01/km^{2})
- Time zone: UTC–8 (Pacific (PST))
  - Summer (DST): UTC–7 (PDT)
- ZIP Code: 97071
- Area codes: 503 and 971
- FIPS code: 41-83750
- GNIS feature ID: 2412296
- Website: woodburn-or.gov

Woodburn is a city in Marion County, Oregon, United States. Incorporated in 1889, the community had been platted in 1871 after the arrival of the railroad. The city is located in the northern end of the Willamette Valley between Portland and Salem. Interstate 5 connects it to major cities to the north and south. Oregon routes 211, 214, 219, and 99E also serve the city, as do Union Pacific and Willamette Valley Railway freight rail lines.

The population was 26,013 at the 2020 census, and was estimated to be 30,449 in 2024, Woodburn is part of the Salem metropolitan area. It is the third-most populous in that metropolitan area after Salem and Keizer.

== History ==
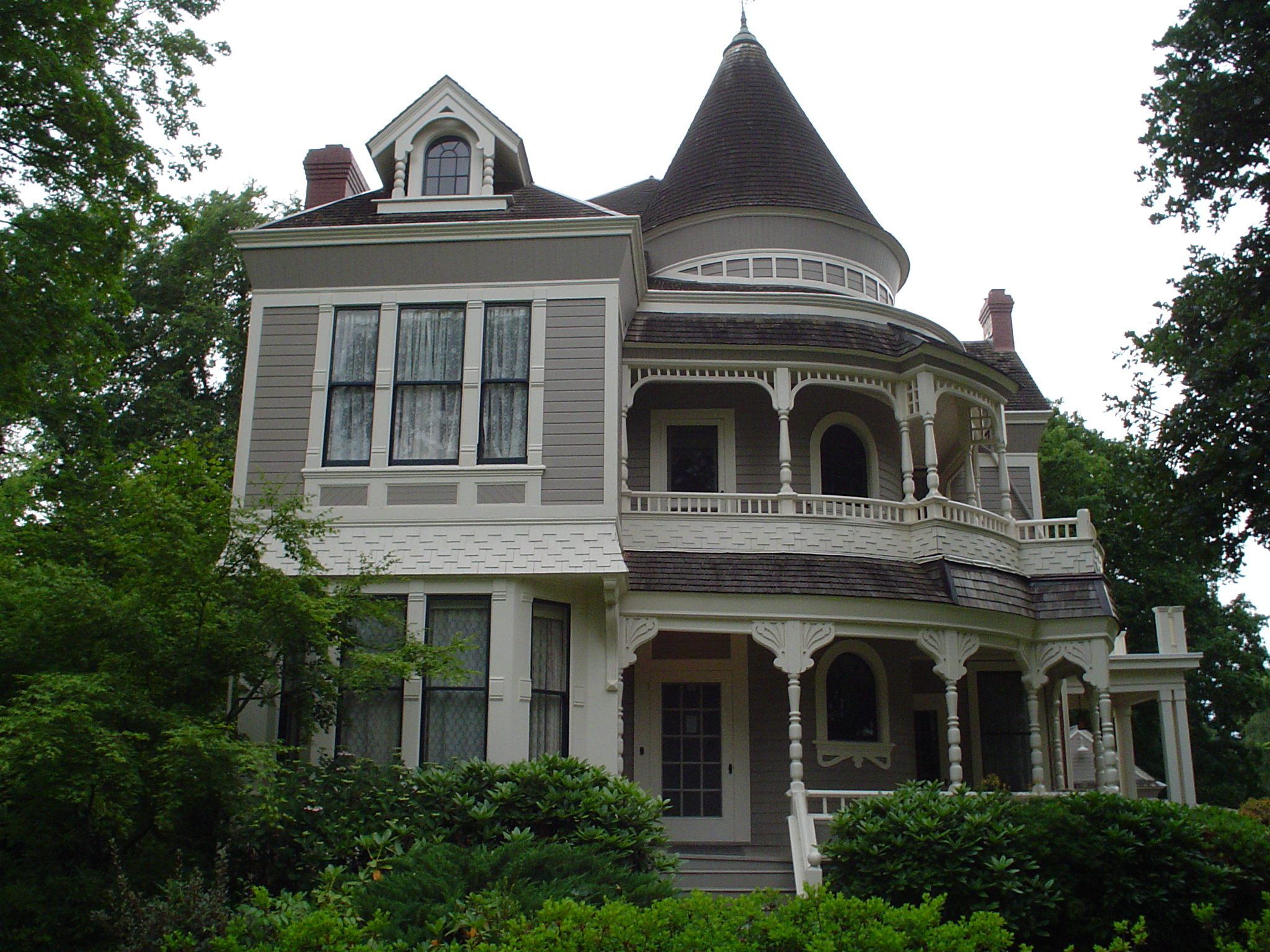
Settlemier House in 2007

Originally, the area around Woodburn was inhabited by the Kalapuya Native Americans. After the Provisional Government of Oregon set-up land claims in the Oregon Country, the United States annexed much of the Pacific Northwest and established the Oregon Territory in 1848. Congress passed the Donation Land Claim Act in 1850 and many earlier land claims became donation land claims.

Eli C. Cooley, Bradford S. Bonney, George Leisure, and Jean B. Ducharme all established donation land claims on the eastern part of the French Prairie where Woodburn would later be founded. Cooley immigrated to Oregon in 1845, and Bonney established his land claim in 1849. Ducharme's land was sold off in 1862 in a foreclosure, with Mt. Angel farmer Jesse Settlemier, purchasing the 214 acres (87 ha) for cheap.

Settlemier had traveled west over the Oregon Trail in 1849 and first settled in California before moving north to Oregon in 1850. He settled in the Mt. Angel area where he was a successful nurseryman. Settlemier then moved to his new property in 1863 and established the Woodburn Nursery Company. Despite improvements to the land, including construction of his home, title in the land remained in doubt due to the purchase via a foreclosure.

During the litigation over title in the land, Settlemier borrowed money from capitalist William Reed with the land as collateral. When Reed began to build a railroad through the area, he decided to run the line through what became Woodburn in anticipation of acquiring the land himself, as he expected Settlemier to default on the mortgage. However, Settlemier did not default and eventually his case made it to the Supreme Court of the United States in Settlemier v. Sullivan, 97 U.S. 444 (1878). He gained a favorable ruling and retained the land.

Meanwhile, transportation baron Ben Holladay ran his Oregon and California Railroad through what became Woodburn in 1871, at which time Settlemier platted the first four blocks of the town.

Originally, the town and station were called Halsey, but the name was changed to Woodburn due to the existence of Halsey, Oregon, further down the valley. The name Woodburn came about after a slash burn that got out of control and burned down a nearby woodlot in the 1880s, after the railroad line had been laid through the area. A railroad official witnessed the fire and renamed the community. The city was incorporated by the Oregon Legislative Assembly on February 20, 1889.

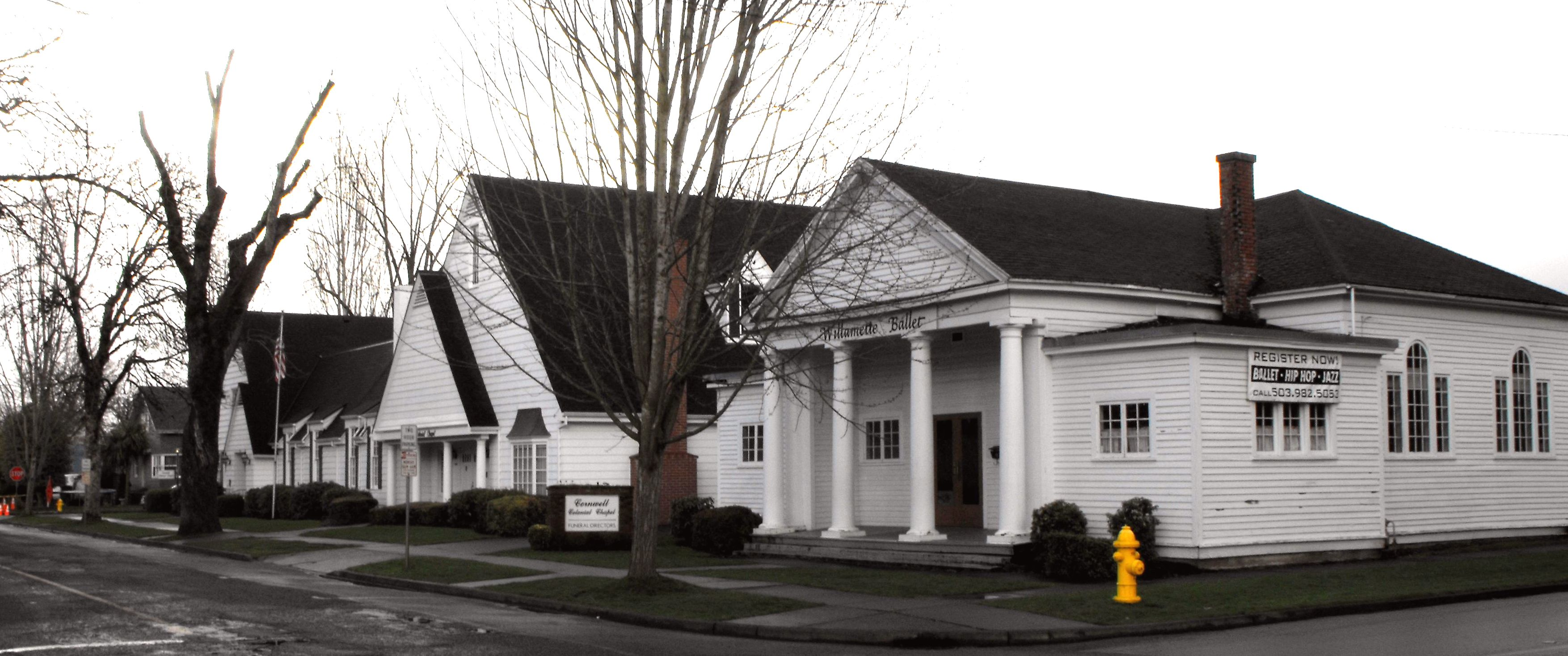
Corner of 2nd and Garfield. Willamette Ballet Academy and Cornwell colonial chapel.

== Geography and climate ==
Woodburn is in northern Marion County, 17 miles (27 km) north-northeast of Salem and 11 miles (18 km) southwest of Canby via Oregon Route 99E. It is 30 miles (48 km) south-southwest of Portland. Oregon Route 211 leads east 15 miles (24 km) to Molalla, Route 214 leads southeast 7 miles (11 km) to Mt. Angel and 12 miles (19 km) to Silverton, and Route 219 leads northwest 10 miles (16 km) to St. Paul.

According to the United States Census Bureau, the city has a total area of 6.197 square miles (16.05 km^{2}), all land. Mill Creek passes through the city, flowing northeast to join the Pudding River at Aurora.

Climate data for Woodburn, Oregon
Month	Jan	Feb	Mar	Apr	May	Jun	Jul	Aug	Sep	Oct	Nov	Dec	Year
Mean daily maximum °F (°C)	47 (8)	51 (11)	56 (13)	61 (16)	68 (20)	74 (23)	81 (27)	82 (28)	77 (25)	65 (18)	53 (12)	46 (8)	63 (17)
Mean daily minimum °F (°C)	34 (1)	36 (2)	38 (3)	41 (5)	45 (7)	50 (10)	53 (12)	54 (12)	50 (10)	43 (6)	39 (4)	34 (1)	43 (6)
Average precipitation inches (mm)	6.08 (154)	4.98 (126)	4.43 (113)	3.09 (78)	2.47 (63)	1.65 (42)	0.59 (15)	0.83 (21)	1.58 (40)	3.44 (87)	6.25 (159)	6.62 (168)	42.02 (1,067)
Average snowfall inches (cm)	1 (2.5)	3 (7.6)	0 (0)	0 (0)	0 (0)	0 (0)	0 (0)	0 (0)	0 (0)	0 (0)	0.2 (0.51)	2 (5.1)	6.2 (16)

See or edit raw graph data.

== Demographics ==
Historical population
Census	Pop.	Note	%±
1890	405		—
1900	828		104.4%
1910	1,616		95.2%
1920	1,656		2.5%
1930	1,675		1.1%
1940	1,982		18.3%
1950	2,395		20.8%
1960	3,120		30.3%
1970	7,495		140.2%
1980	11,196		49.4%
1990	13,404		19.7%
2000	20,100		50.0%
2010	24,080		19.8%
2020	26,013		8.0%
2024 (est.)	30,449		17.1%
U.S. Decennial Census; 2020 Census

According to realtor website Zillow, the average price of a home as of July 31, 2025, in Woodburn is $427,524.

As of the 2023 American Community Survey, there are 8,788 estimated households in Woodburn with an average of 3.03 persons per household. The city has a median household income of $67,469. Approximately 15.2% of the city's population lives at or below the poverty line. Woodburn has an estimated 61.8% employment rate, with 16.7% of the population holding a bachelor's degree or higher and 70.9% holding a high school diploma.

The top five reported languages (people were allowed to report up to two languages, thus the figures will generally add to more than 100%) were English (41.6%), Spanish (54.1%), Indo-European (2.7%), Asian and Pacific Islander (0.8%), and Other (0.7%).

The median age in the city was 38.5 years.

=== Racial and ethnic composition ===
Woodburn, Oregon – racial and ethnic composition Note: the US Census treats Hispanic/Latino as an ethnic category. This table excludes Latinos from the racial categories and assigns them to a separate category. Hispanics/Latinos may be of any race.
Race / ethnicity (NH = non-Hispanic)	Pop. 1990	Pop. 2000	Pop. 2010	Pop. 2020	% 1990	% 2000	% 2010	% 2020
White alone (NH)	9,048	9,342	9,265	8,786	67.50%	46.48%	38.48%	33.78%
Black or African American alone (NH)	25	60	60	103	0.19%	0.30%	0.25%	0.40%
Native American or Alaska Native alone (NH)	54	140	99	91	0.40%	0.70%	0.41%	0.35%
Asian alone (NH)	49	100	158	259	0.37%	0.50%	0.66%	1.00%
Pacific Islander alone (NH)	—	11	17	42	—	0.05%	0.07%	0.16%
Other race alone (NH)	17	18	37	104	0.13%	0.09%	0.15%	0.40%
Mixed race or multiracial (NH)	—	365	261	608	—	1.82%	1.08%	2.34%
Hispanic or Latino (any race)	4,211	10,064	14,183	16,020	31.42%	50.07%	58.90%	61.58%
Total	13,404	20,100	24,080	26,013	100.00%	100.00%	100.00%	100.00%

=== 2020 census ===
As of the 2020 census, there were 26,013 people, 8,221 households, and 6,003 families residing in the city. The population density was 4,439.84 inhabitants per square mile (1,714.2/km^{2}), and the housing unit density was 1,546.85 per square mile (597.2/km^{2}).

The median age was 35.1 years. 27.4% of residents were under the age of 18 and 17.3% of residents were 65 years of age or older. For every 100 females there were 99.2 males, and for every 100 females age 18 and over there were 96.5 males age 18 and over.

There were 8,221 households in Woodburn, of which 39.6% had children under the age of 18 living in them. Of all households, 51.5% were married-couple households, 15.2% were households with a male householder and no spouse or partner present, and 27.1% were households with a female householder and no spouse or partner present. About 21.8% of all households were made up of individuals and 14.0% had someone living alone who was 65 years of age or older.

There were 8,517 housing units, of which 3.5% were vacant. Among occupied housing units, 64.5% were owner-occupied and 35.5% were renter-occupied. The homeowner vacancy rate was 0.7% and the rental vacancy rate was 4.3%.

100.0% of residents lived in urban areas, while 0% lived in rural areas.

Racial composition as of the 2020 census
Race	Number	Percent
White	10,964	42.1%
Black or African American	122	0.5%
American Indian and Alaska Native	1,300	5.0%
Asian	274	1.1%
Native Hawaiian and Other Pacific Islander	68	0.3%
Some other race	8,434	32.4%
Two or more races	4,851	18.6%
Hispanic or Latino (of any race)	16,020	61.6%

=== 2010 census ===
As of the 2010 census, there were 24,080 people, 7,545 households, and 5,375 families residing in the city. The population density was 4,484.2 inhabitants per square mile (1,731.4/km^{2}). There were 8,283 housing units at an average density of 1,542.5 per square mile (595.6/km^{2}). The racial makeup of the city was 60.43% White, 0.54% African American, 2.80% Native American, 0.79% Asian, 0.11% Pacific Islander, 31.55% from some other races and 3.78% from two or more races. Hispanic or Latino people of any race were 58.90% of the population.

There were 7,545 households, of which 35.9% had children under the age of 18 living with them, 53.8% were married couples living together, 11.6% had a female householder with no husband present, 5.9% had a male householder with no wife present, and 28.8% were non-families. 24.0% of all households were made up of individuals, and 15.6% had someone living alone who was 65 years of age or older. The average household size was 3.17 and the average family size was 3.74.

The median age in the city was 31.7 years. 30.9% of residents were under the age of 18; 9.6% were between the ages of 18 and 24; 26.2% were from 25 to 44; 17.9% were from 45 to 64; and 15.4% were 65 years of age or older. The gender makeup of the city was 50.2% male and 49.8% female.

=== 2000 census ===
As of the 2000 census, there are 20,100 people, 6,274 households, and 4,492 families residing in the city. The population density was 3,865.8 inhabitants per square mile (1,492.6/km^{2}). There were 6,824 housing units at an average density of 1,312.5 per square mile (506.8/km^{2}). The racial makeup of the city was 58.12% White, 0.45% African American, 1.17% Native American, 0.53% Asian, 0.07% Pacific Islander, 35.66% from some other races and 4.00% from two or more races. Hispanic or Latino people of any race were 50.07% of the population.

There are 6,274 households out of which 34.6% have children under the age of 18 living with them, 58.1% are married couples living together, 8.7% have a female householder with no husband present, and 28.4% are non-families. 23.9% of all households are made up of individuals and 16.5% have someone living alone who is 65 years of age or older. The average household size is 3.11 and the average family size is 3.63.

In the city the population is spread out with 30.0% under the age of 18, 11.8% from 18 to 24, 25.5% from 25 to 44, 14.6% from 45 to 64, and 18.1% who are 65 years of age or older. The median age is 30 years. For every 100 females there are 107.2 males. For every 100 females age 18 and over, there are 104.7 males.

The median income for a household in the city is $33,722, and the median income for a family is $36,730. Males have a median income of $21,702 versus $22,606 for females. The per capita income for the city is $12,954. 17.3% of the population and 11.5% of families are below the poverty line. Out of the total population, 23.6% of those under the age of 18 and 8.8% of those 65 and older are living below the poverty line.

=== Old Believers ===
Woodburn is home for a sizable community of Russian Orthodox Old Believers. This Christian traditionalist church had escaped religious prosecution from the post-revolution Russia and moved to the United States from Turkey in the 1950s. Its women wear traditional long skirts and scarfs, and its men wear beards.

Also present in the city are communities of Russian Molokans, Doukhobors and recent refugees from the former USSR: Ukrainian and Russian Pentecostals and Baptists.

=== Mexican immigration ===
In the 1950s, Mexican immigration to Oregon began to increase. Woodburn became a destination that accumulated immigrant farmworkers, and was a place where Mexican workers were caught in sweeps during a federal initiative called Operation Wetback, which returned about one million undocumented immigrants to Mexico. Immigration of Mexicans to Woodburn continued to increase through the 1980s, when Latinos made up about 2.5 percent of Oregon's population. By the early 21st century, 59% of the population of Woodburn was Latino, with a mix of first-generation immigrants and long-term residents.

=== Woodburn Estates ===
Woodburn is home to the largest 55+ retirement community in Oregon, with 1,510 single family homes, a mobile home park, a private, eighteen hole golf course surrounding a clubhouse with auditorium, swimming pool, fitness center, restaurant, billiards room, crafts room, RV storage, and a variety of social events, clubs and activities. The Woodburn Estates are located between Interstate 5 and North Boones Ferry Road in Woodburn.

== Economy ==
In August 1999, Woodburn Premium Outlets, known as the Woodburn Company Stores until June 2013, opened in Woodburn. This is an outlet mall with many name-brand clothing companies represented.

MacLaren Youth Correctional Facility is on Oregon Route 99E on the outskirts of Woodburn, in which young delinquent and criminal males are incarcerated.

== Arts and culture ==
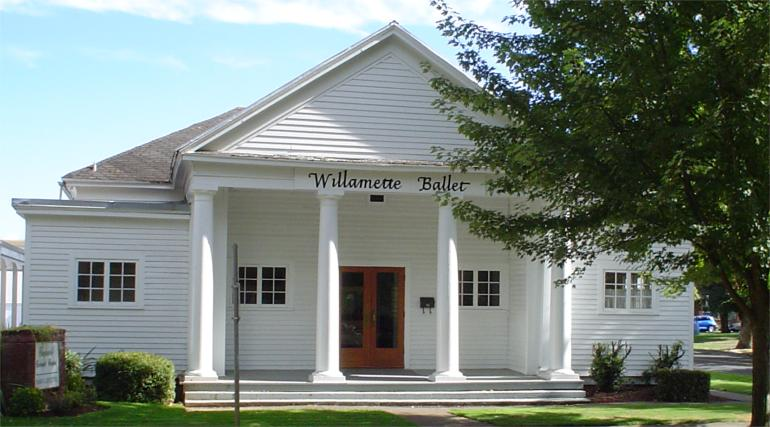
Willamette Ballet

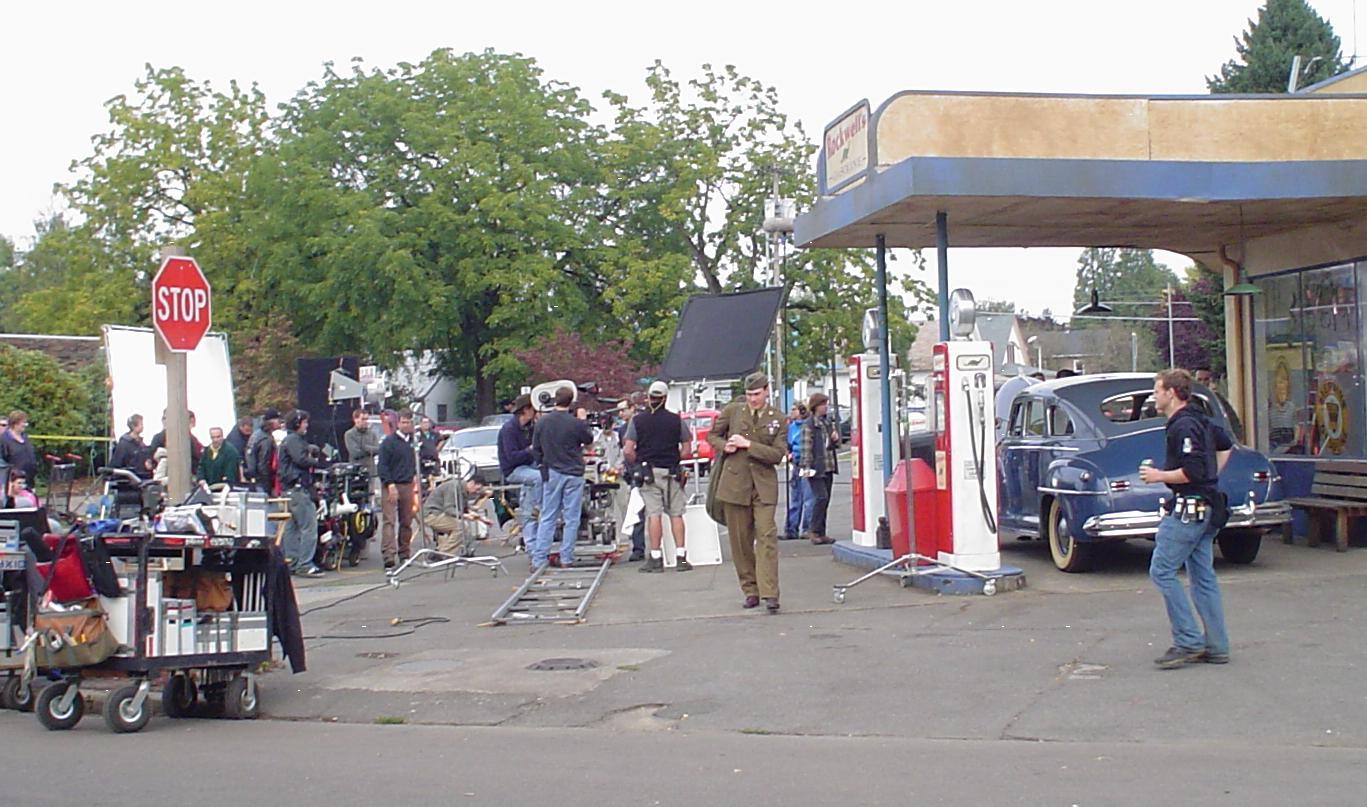
Chris Klein filming Hallmark Hall of Fame Production The Valley of Light in downtown Woodburn

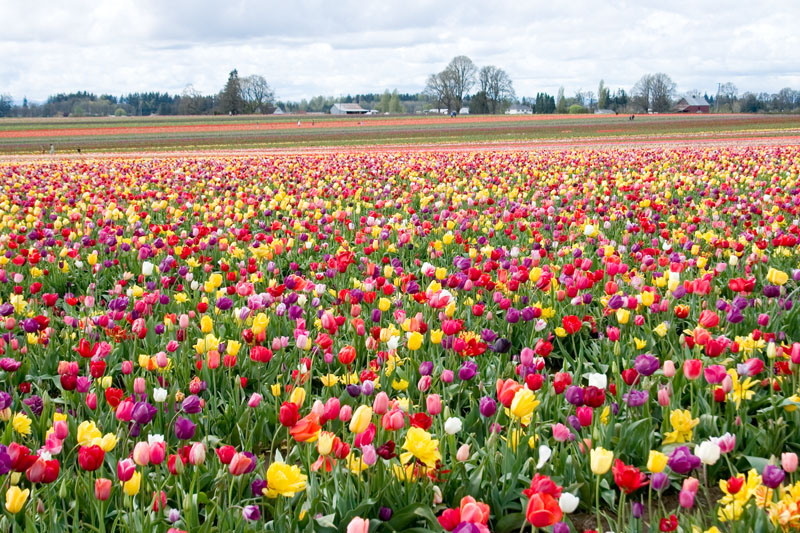
Wooden Shoe Tulip Festival in 2007

Willamette Ballet Academy was founded in 1982.

Scenes from the 2007 Hallmark Hall of Fame production The Valley of Light, starring Chris Klein, were filmed in Woodburn.

=== Museums and other points of interest ===
Listed in 1974 on the National Register of Historic Places, the Jesse H. Settlemier House is a museum located on Settlemier Avenue. The World's Berry Center Museum was founded in the early 1980s. The World's Berry Center Museum occasionally produces plays by Miracle Theatre.

La Fiesta Mexicana is the most important Hispanic event in the area. Each fiesta should include a queen; Francisca Gonzalez was the first selected to receive this honor in the first fiesta in 1964. It was a one-day event that was held in downtown Woodburn. Forty-five years later, the event has grown more popular and now it lasts close to a week. One of the main reasons this event happened was that the ranchers and merchants recognized the importance of the new bicultural relationship with the increased Hispanic population in the area.

== Sports ==
The Woodburn Dragstrip is a 1/4-mile National Hot Rod Association (NHRA) dragstrip that hosts an annual event on the NHRA Lucas Oil Series. It is located about 2 miles (3 km) west of Woodburn on Oregon Highway 219.

The Oregon Golf Association (OGA) Golf Course in Woodburn is a public course, rated by Golf Digest in 1996 as one of the top 10 affordable courses in the United States. It routinely hosts many large amateur and high school events in the state.

The Woodburn Golf Club is a 9-hole public course 2 miles west of Woodburn. Established in 1925, play is on a first come basis with sand greens.

== Education ==
Woodburn is served by the Woodburn School District, which includes four elementary schools and two middle schools. Woodburn High School included the following small schools: the Wellness, Business and Sports School, the Woodburn Academy of Art, Science and Technology, the Academy of International Studies at Woodburn, and the Woodburn Arts and Communications Academy. But the small school model was abandoned at the beginning of the 2022 school year. Woodburn Success High School is the district's alternative high school, serving grades 7–12.

Chemeketa Community College has a satellite campus in Woodburn.

Pacific University opened a College of Education satellite campus in 2012.

== Media ==
The Woodburn Independent is a weekly community newspaper serving the immediate area. The region is also served by the larger Statesman Journal daily newspaper based in Salem and the state's largest newspaper The Oregonian based in Portland.

Woodburn is home to two radio stations. KWBY broadcasts a regional Mexican format and is owned by 94 Country, Inc. It transmits as "La Pantera" ("The Panther") 940 AM. KPCN-LP is a low-power community radio station owned and operated by Oregon's largest farmworker union, los Pineros y Campesinos Unidos del Noroeste (PCUN). The station was built by volunteers from Woodburn and around the country in August 2006 at the tenth Prometheus Radio Project barnraising. KPCN broadcasts music, news, and public affairs to listeners in Spanish and several indigenous Latin American languages. It transmits as "Radio Movimiento" ("Movement Radio") 95.9 FM with the slogan "La Voz del Pueblo" ("The Voice of the People").

== Infrastructure ==
=== Transportation ===
The Transit Division of the Woodburn Community Services Department runs the Woodburn Transit System (WTS), which uses small buses during non-holiday weekdays within the city's limits, and the Dial-a-Ride program, which operates paratransit vans for reservation by the elderly and disabled during weekdays within the local area and, for medical appointments, anywhere between Portland and Salem.

Other public bus systems making stops in Woodburn include CARTS (Chemeketa Area Regional Transportation System), administered by Oregon Housing and Associated Services, Inc. (OHAS) in Salem, and CAT (Canby Area Transit), run by the city of Canby. Both also only operate during non-holiday weekdays.

Greyhound buses also stop in the city. Amtrak's Coast Starlight and Cascades trains pass through but do not stop. The Amtrak affiliated Cascades POINT bus service stops at the Woodburn Park & Ride at the Woodburn I-5 exit.

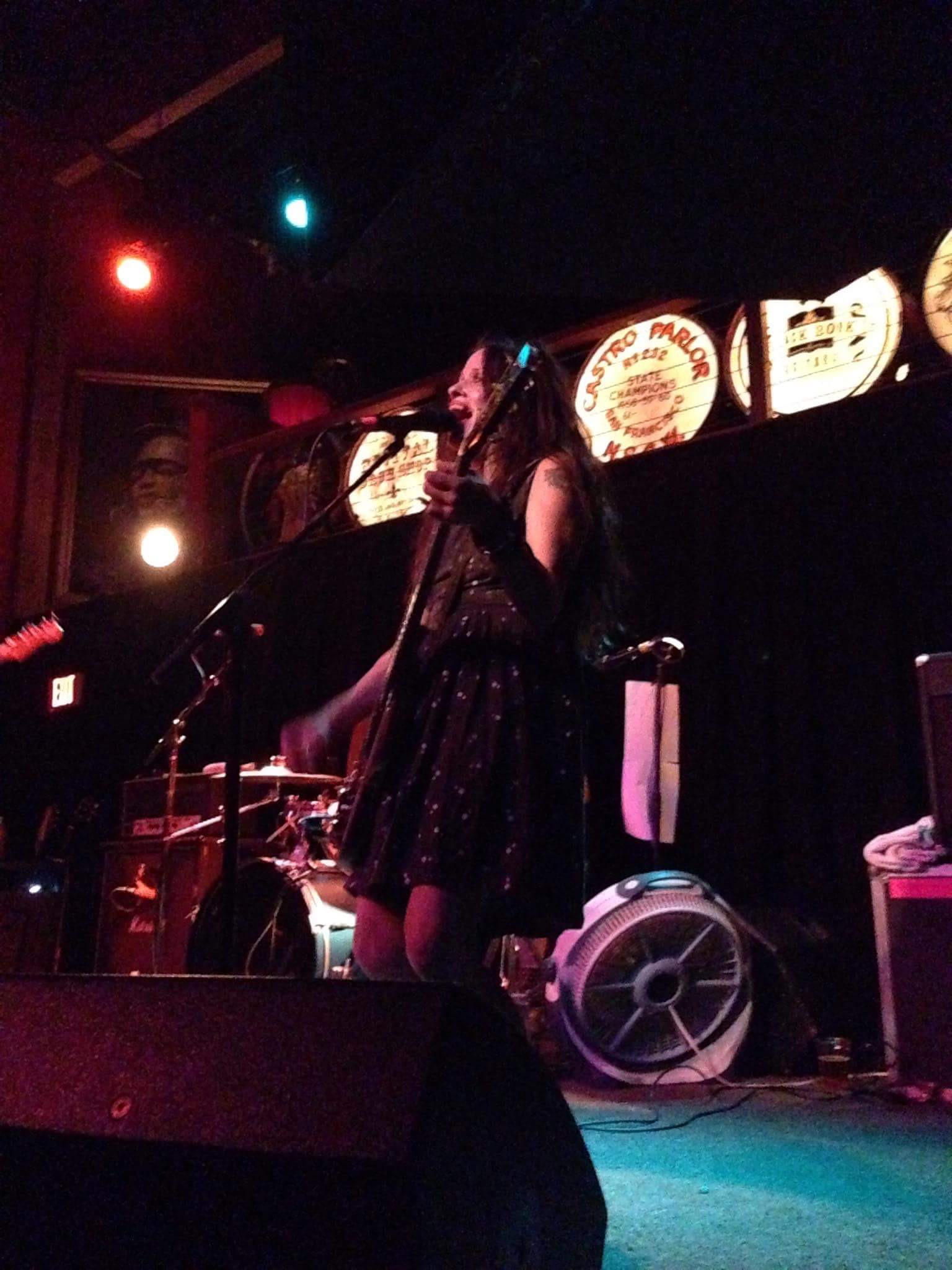
Kat Bjelland, lead singer of Babes in Toyland, grew up in Woodburn.

== Notable people ==
Stacy Allison (born 1958), a 1976 graduate of Woodburn High School and a 1984 Oregon State University alum, was the first American woman to reach the summit of Mount Everest, during her second attempt on September 29, 1988. That same year, when Mayor Nancy Kirksey declared November 17 "Stacy Allison Day," she visited and spoke at several Woodburn venues and attended ceremonies when a street in the city, Stacy Allison Way, was dedicated to her.

Kat Bjelland, of the punk band Babes in Toyland, grew up in Woodburn. Her first performance was at the now-closed Flight 99 tavern.

Model and actress Kate Nauta grew up in Woodburn and lived there until 2000.

Dorothy Olsen, pilot and member of the Women Airforce Service Pilots (WASPs) during World War II, was born in Woodburn.

Woodburn-born baseball player Dick Whitman was an outfielder for the Brooklyn Dodgers and Philadelphia Phillies; the teams played in the 1949 and 1950 World Series, respectively.

Cliff Zauner represented Woodburn in the Oregon House of Representatives.

== See also ==
- Woodburn bank bombing
