= WCBS =

WCBS may refer to:

- The following broadcasting stations:
  - WCBS-FM, a New York City radio station (101.1 FM), with a classic hits format
  - WCBS-TV, a New York City TV station (PSIP 2/RF 36), flagship station of the CBS television network
  - WFMB (AM), a Springfield, Illinois radio station (1450 AM), that held the call sign WCBS from 1926 to 1946
  - WHSQ, a New York City radio station (880 AM), that held the call sign WCBS from 1946 to 2024
- Other
  - World Confederation of Billiards Sports
