= West Coast Bancorp =

Publicly traded financial services holding company

- Company type: Public
- Industry: Finance and Insurance
- Founded: 1925
- Defunct: Bought in 2012
- Headquarters: Lake Oswego, Oregon, U.S.
- Area served: Oregon, western Washington
- Products: Consumer banking Financial services
- Revenue: $179.6M USD (2006)
- Subsidiaries: West Coast Bank; West Coast Trust

West Coast Bancorp was a publicly traded financial services holding company headquartered in Lake Oswego, Oregon. Its principal holding was West Coast Bank, a full-service, commercial bank with 63 branches in 40 cities in western and central Oregon and western Washington. As of December 31, 2006, the company had deposits totaling $2 billion and net loans of $1.9 billion. In September 2012, Columbia Banking System of Tacoma bought West Coast.

== History ==
The company was first organized in 1925 in Newport, Oregon, under the name of Bank of Newport. In 1995, Bank of Newport merged with Commercial Bank of Salem, Oregon. In 1999, after acquisitions of the Bank of Vancouver (of Vancouver, Washington), and Centennial Bank of Olympia, Washington, the new entity changed its name to West Coast Bank.

In October 2009, the company raised $155 million in additional capital, but also received a warning about its lending practices from federal and state regulators. Columbia Bank System of Tacoma, Washington, and West Coast announced on September 26, 2012, that Columbia would purchase West Coast in a cash-and-stock deal worth $506 million. It had traded on the NASDAQ as WCBO.

== Operations ==
West Coast Bank offered savings, checking, money market, CD, and NOW accounts in addition to credit cards. The bank also originated commercial and residential real estate mortgage loans, as well as construction, commercial, and consumer loans.

Another subsidiary, West Coast Trust, Inc., provided agency, fiduciary and other related trust services in Oregon. The company also operated a mortgage loan office in Bend, Oregon and a mortgage loan office and Small Business Administration lending office in Vancouver, Washington.

== See also ==
- List of companies based in Oregon
- Woodburn bank bombing
