= List of Padma Shri award recipients in sports =

Recipients of a civilian award in India

Padma Shri Award, India's fourth highest civilian honours - Winners in the field of Sports:

Name	Field	State	Year
Balbir Singh	Sports	Chandigarh	1957
Kunwar Digvijai Singh	Sports	Uttar Pradesh	1958
Mihir Kumar Sen	Sports	West Bengal	1959
Milkha Singh	Sports	Chandigarh	1959
Jasu M. Patel	Sports	Gujarat	1960
Vijay S. Hazare	Sports	Gujarat	1960
Arati Saha	Sports	West Bengal	1960
Gyan Singh	Sports	Uttar Pradesh	1961
Gostha Behari Paul	Sports	West Bengal	1962
Nari J. Contractor	Sports	Maharashtra	1962
P.R. Umrigar	Sports	Maharashtra	1962
Ramanathan Krishnan	Sports	Tamil Nadu	1962
Sonam Gyatso	Sports	Sikkim	1962
Syed Mustaq Ali	Sports	Madhya Pradesh	1963
Morapakan Tesian Gopalan	Sports	Tamil Nadu	1964
Nawang Gombu	Sports	West Bengal	1964
Charanjit Singh	Sports	Haryana	1964
Avtar Singh Vohra Cheema	Sports	Punjab	1965
Hari Pal Singh Ahluwalia	Sports	Punjab	1965
Narender Kumar	Sports	Punjab	1965
Dinkar Balwant Deodhar	Sports	Maharashtra	1965
Ang Kami	Sports	Assam	1965
Chandra Prakash Vohra	Sports	West Bengal	1965
HCS Rawat (Harish Chandra Singh Rawat)	Sports	Delhi	1965
Phu Dorjee	Sports	West Bengal	1965
Sonam Wangyal	Sports	Sikkim	1965
Wilson Lionel Garton Jones	Sports	Maharashtra	1965
Kishan Lal	Sports	Uttar Pradesh	1966
Mohd. Mansur Ali Khan Pataudi	Sports	Delhi	1967
Gurdial Singh	Sports	Chandigarh	1967
Prithipal Singh	Sports	Punjab	1967
Shankar Laxman	Sports	Karnataka	1967
Chandrakant Gulabrao Borde	Sports	Maharashtra	1969
Bishan Singh Bedi	Sports	Delhi	1970
E. Ananthrao S. Prasanna	Sports	Karnataka	1970
Syed Mohd. Moinul Haq	Sports	Bihar	1970
Ghouse Mohd Khan	Sports	Andhra Pradesh	1971
Gundappa Ranganath Vishwanath	Sports	Karnataka	1971
Leslie Walter Claudius	Sports	West Bengal	1971
Sailendra Nath Manna	Sports	West Bengal	1971
Chandgi Ram	Sports	Delhi	1971
Kamaljit Sandhu	Sports	United States	1971
Harsh Vardhan Bahuguna	Sports	Uttar Pradesh	1972
Ajit Laxman Wadekar	Sports	Maharashtra	1972
B. Subrahmanya Chandrasekhar	Sports	Karnataka	1972
Farookh M. Engineer	Sports	Maharashtra	1973
Joginder Singh	Sports	Delhi	1974
Pankaj Lall Roy	Sports	West Bengal	1975
Hari Dang	Sports	Delhi	1976
Roshan Lal Anand	Sports	Punjab	1976
Meena Shah	Sports	Uttar Pradesh	1977
