= Avtar Singh Cheema =

Indian alpinist (1933-1989)

Avatar Singh Cheema
- Born: Punjab, India
- Military career
- Allegiance: India
- Branch: Army
- Awards: Padma Shri; Arjuna Award

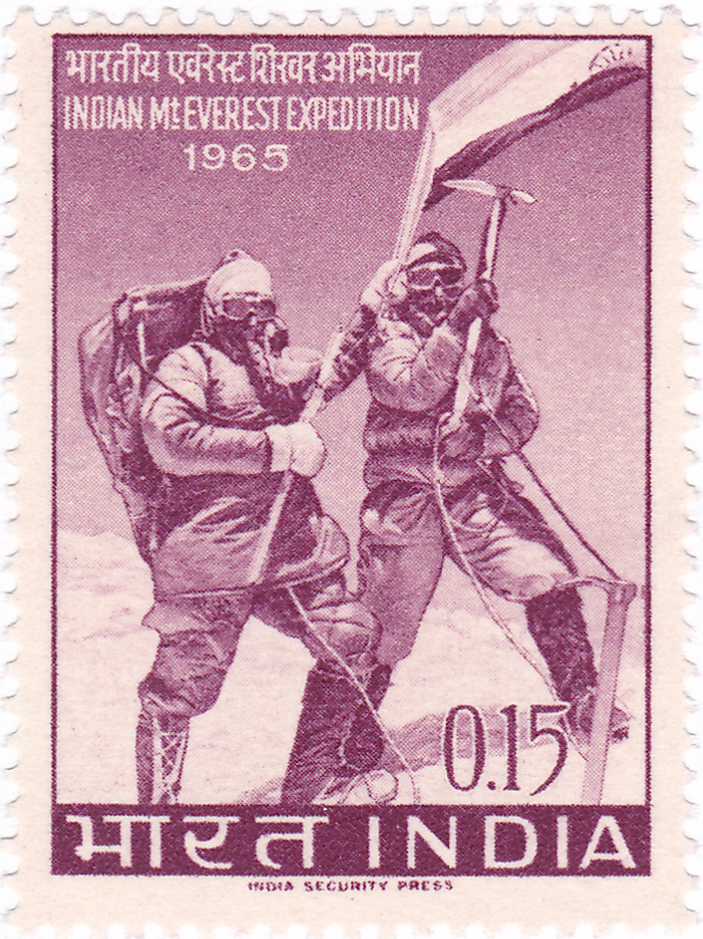
1965 Indian stamp dedicated to the 1965 Everest Expedition

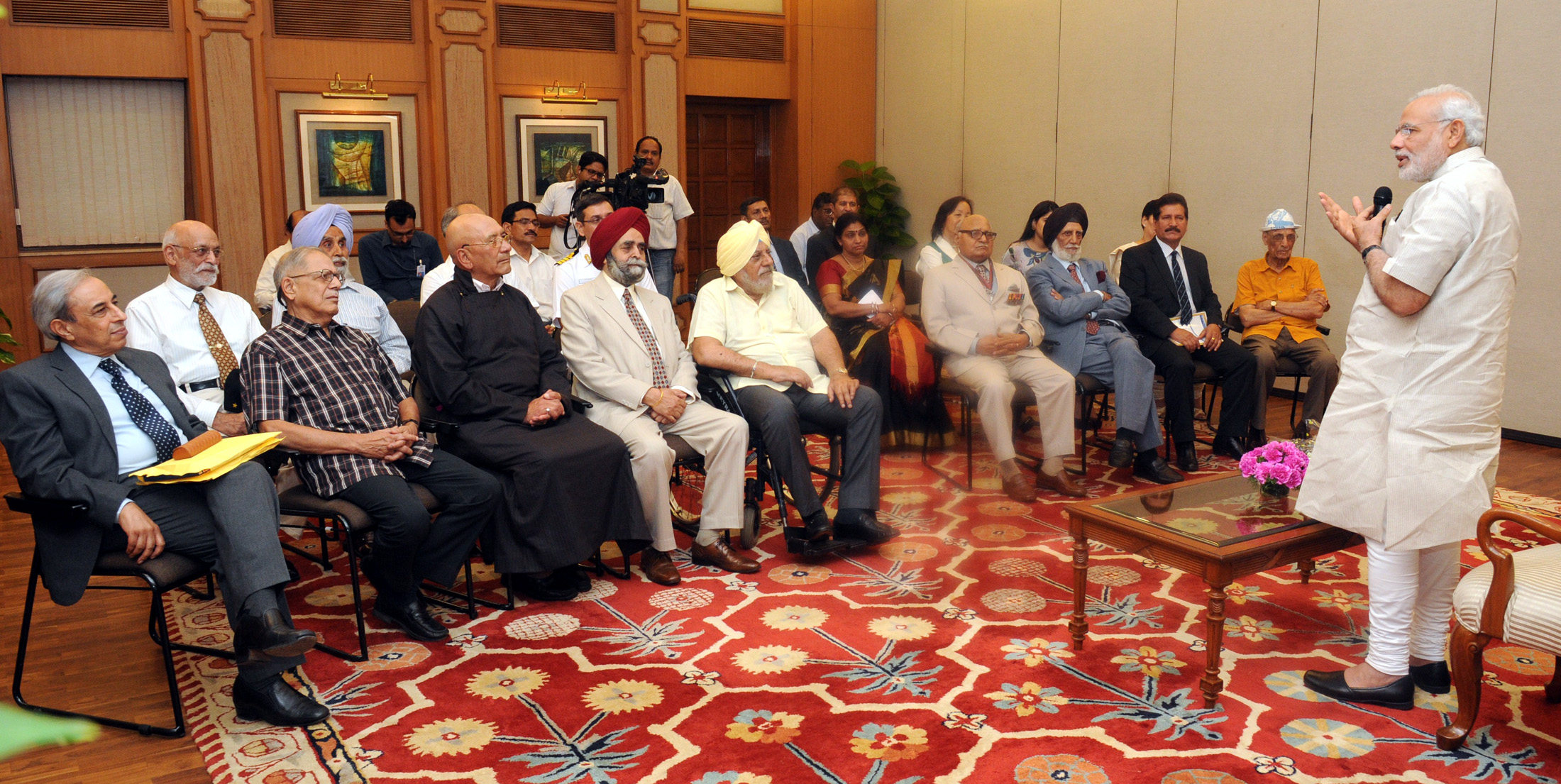
Prime Minister, Shri Narendra Modi meets the members of Indian Everest Expedition 1965 on the occasion of Golden Jubilee of this on 20 May 2015

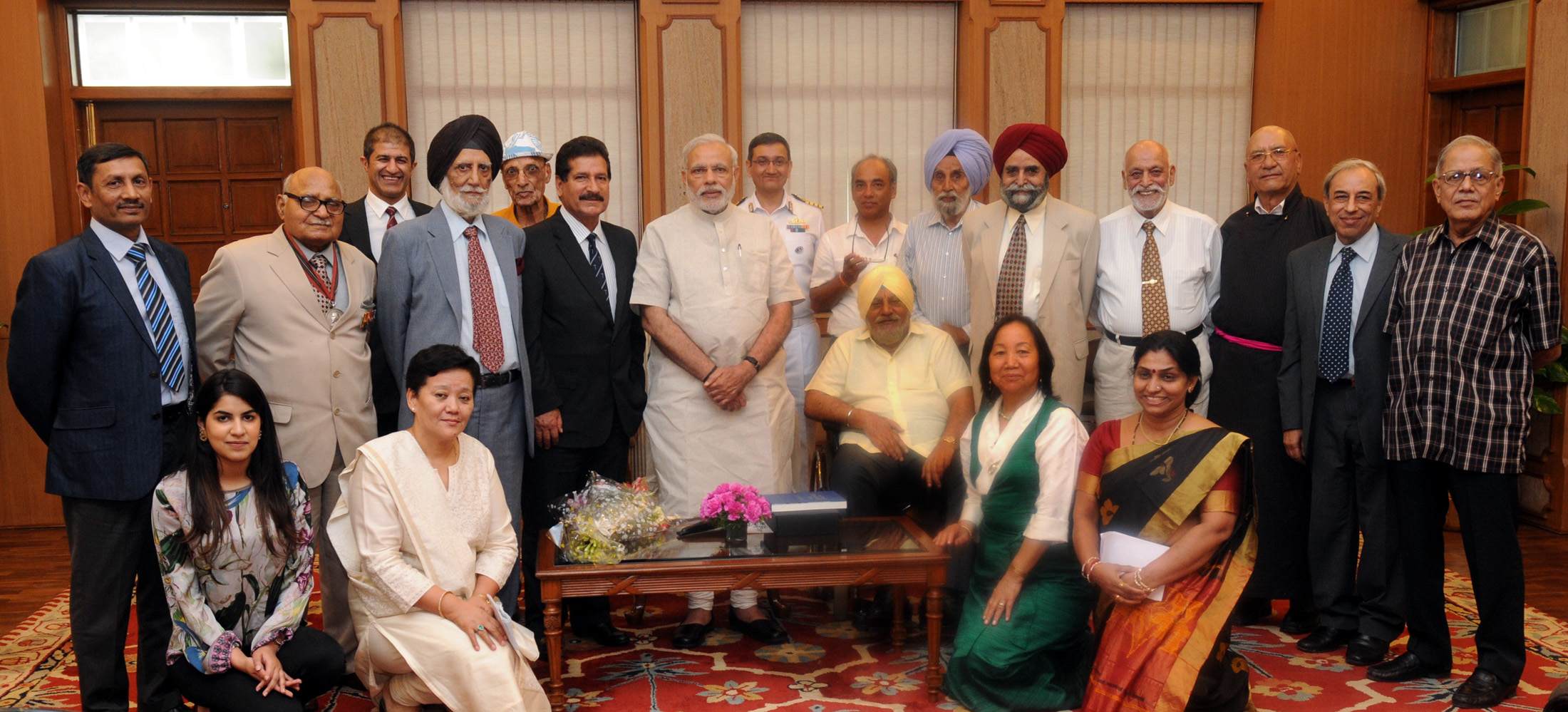
Prime Minister, Shri Narendra Modi and members of Indian Everest Expedition

Avtar Singh Cheema (1933–1989) was the first Indian born man and the 16th person in world to climb Mount Everest. Along with 8 others he was a part of the third mission undertaken by the Indian Army, in 1965, to climb Mount Everest after two failed attempts. The Indian Everest Expedition 1965 put 9 mountaineers on the summit on 20 May, a record which was unbroken until the 1978 German-French Expedition 13 years later., and was led by Captain M S Kohli. Cheema's fellow summiters were Nawang Gombu, Sonam Gyatso, Sonam Wangyal, Chandra Prakash Vohra, Ang Kami, H. P. S. Ahluwalia, Harish Chandra Singh Rawat and Phu Dorjee. He was a captain in the 7th Battalion, The Parachute regiment at that time. Later he was promoted to colonel and commanded his battalion. He is also founder of Guru Harkrishan Public School in Sri Ganganagar District, Rajasthan.

== Honors and awards ==
He was awarded the Arjuna award and Padma Shri for his achievements.

== See also ==
- Indian summiters of Mount Everest - Year wise
- List of Mount Everest records of India
- List of Mount Everest records
- List of Mount Everest summiters by number of times to the summit
