= Vaassangyaan Chaudhary =

Indian mountain climber

Vaassangyaan Chaudhay
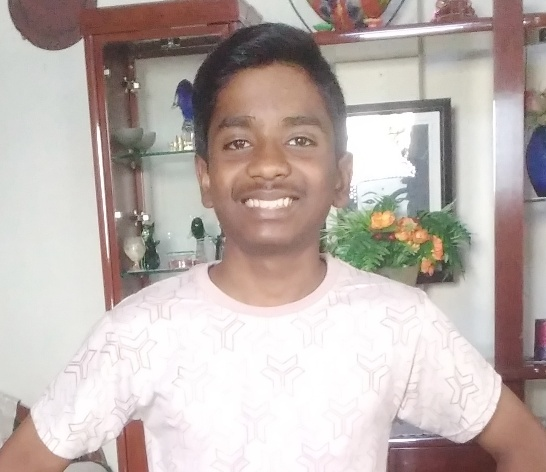
- Vaassangyaan Chaudhay

Vaassangyaan Chaudhary (born 6 December 2004) is an Indian boy who holds two Indian records in mountaineering. On 6 June 2016, at 9.30 am, he scaled Mt. Stok Kangri, a 20,182 feet high peak in the Stok range of Laddakh Himalayas. For this feat, he was certified by the Indian Mountaineering Foundation, as the youngest person to scale this summit, at the age of 11 years.

On 22 June 2017, at 6.30 am, Vaassangyaan Chaudhary scaled the 21,000-foot-high Black Peak (also called Mt. Kala Nag), the highest peak in the Bandarpunch range of the Himalayas. He again created a record in being the youngest to scale this peak, at the age of 12 years.

== Early life and education ==
Vaassangyaan Chaudhary is the son of Manisha and Sandeep Chaudhary. His mother is a psychologist by education, having done her PhD in developmental psychology from the University of Delhi. His father is a chemical engineer by education, having done B.Tech. in chemical technology from the Indian Institute of Technology (I.I.T.), Delhi.

Vaassangyaan has two sisters, Manassangyini, an environment activist, and Suryassangyini Chaudhary, who holds the world record of reaching the 16,300 Khanchendjonga Base Camp, at the age of 6 years.

Vaassangyaan started his schooling at the Pathways World School, an IB school situated on the outskirts of a Delhi suburb, Gurgaon, in 2009. After two years of formal education, seeing his potential for adventure sports as well as other sports like Tennis and Horse Riding, his parents pulled him out of formal schooling, to home-school him. It was during these early years, from 2011 to 2016, that Vaassangyaan started undertaking regular high-altitude treks in the Great Himalayas.

In early 2016, he enrolled at ate Delhi Public School, Sonepat, situated in another suburb of the National Capital Region (NCR) of India. Currently, he is studying in the 8th Grade of his School.
