= Indian Mountaineering Foundation =

High altitude mountaineering organization

- Official Logo of the IMF
- Sport: Mountaineering
- Jurisdiction: India
- Abbreviation: IMF
- Founded: 3 November 1961; 64 years ago
- Headquarters: Delhi, India
- President: Col. Vijay Singh (VSM)
- Vice president: Shri M R Vijayaraghavan
- Secretary: Shri Keerthi Pais

Official website
- www.indmount.org/IMF/welcome
- (India)

Indian Mountaineering Foundation is an apex national body which organize and support, Mountaineering, Rock climbing expeditions at high altitudes in the Himalayas. The organization also promotes and encourages schemes for related adventure activities and environment-protection work in the Indian Himalayas. IMF has organized many expeditions to the high peaks in the Himalayas including Mount Everest.. The IMF also regulates as well as authenticates climbing for foreigners and India climbers all along the Indian Himalayas. Is an active members of UIAA as well UAAA. IMF also promotes Sport Climbing in India as its National Federation for Sport Climbing and is a member of World Climbing and World Climbing Asia.

Col Vijay Singh VSM is the President and Shri Keerthi Pais is the Secretary of the Indian Mountaineering Foundation.

The IMF headquarter is based in New Delhi with its zonal setups in seven zones spread across the country.

== History of IMF ==
The first ascent of Mount Everest in 1953 by Sir Edmund Hillary and Tenzing Norgay generated interest in mountaineering in India which led to the establishment of Indian mountaineering Foundation. IMF was formed in 1957 as the Sponsoring Committee of the Cho Oyu Expedition. The foundation was registered on 3 November 1961 and the new building was inaugurated by Indira Gandhi in 1980, then Prime Minister of India.

== Alternative names ==
In 1959, the organization changed its name to the Sponsoring Committee of Everest Expedition and in the following year it was changed to Sponsoring Committee for Mountaineering Expeditions. On 15 January 1961 it was established as the Indian Mountaineering Foundation with its headquarters in Mumbai, India.

== IMF Mountain Film Festival ==
The IMF Mountain Film Festival is a mountain film festival organized by Indian Mountaineering Foundation, India. This competitive event showcases adventure films shot in the Himalayas. The film festival takes place at the campus of Indian Mountaineering Foundation in New Delhi, India.

The festival is directed by Maninder Kohli, son of the legendary Himalayan mountaineer, Capt. Mohan Singh Kohli who was a member of India's first expedition to the summit of Everest in 1965. Capt. Mohan Kohli was the President of the Indian Mountaineering Foundation from 1989 to 1993.

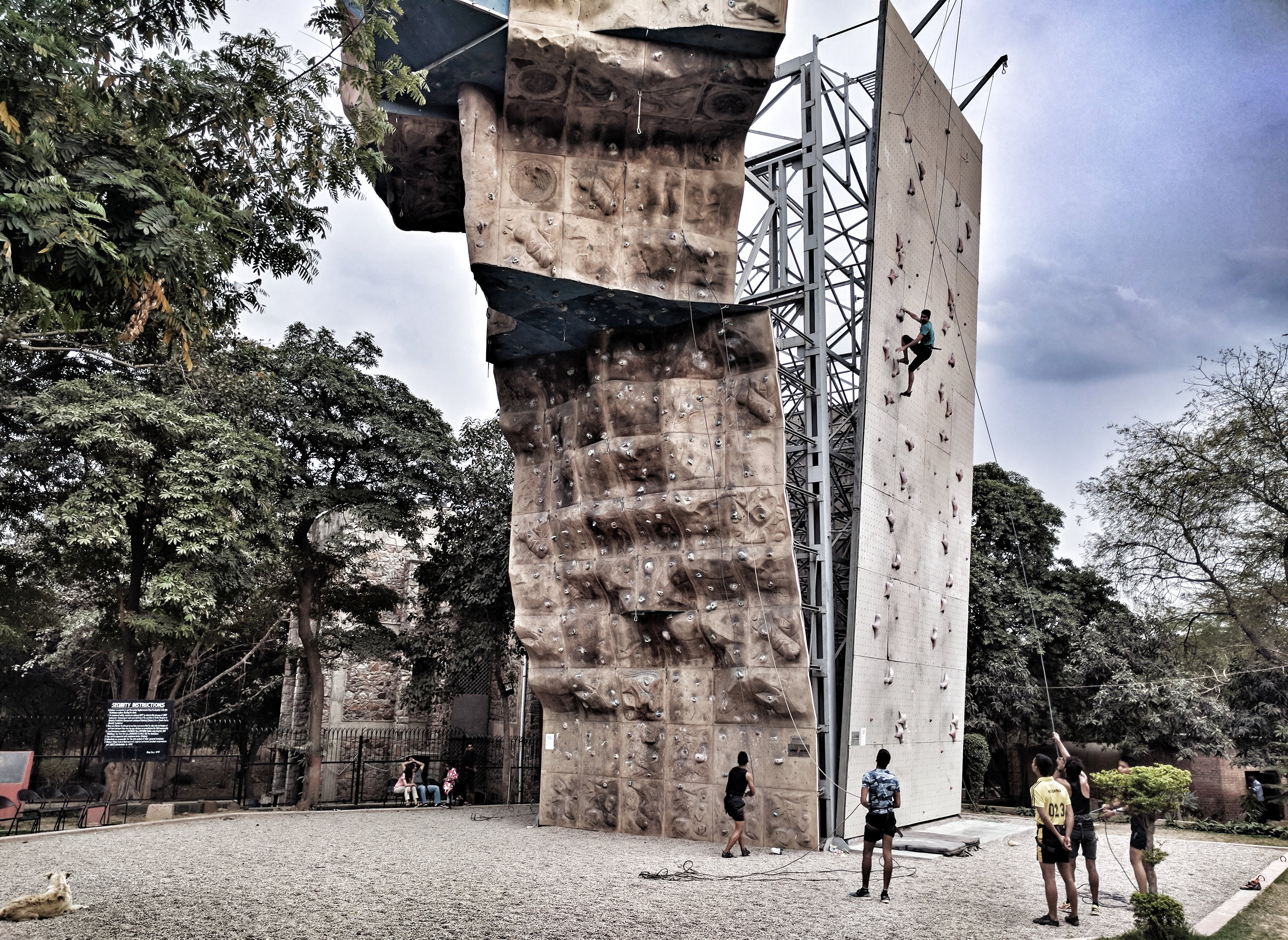
Climbing walls at the Indian Mountaineering Foundation center in New Delhi

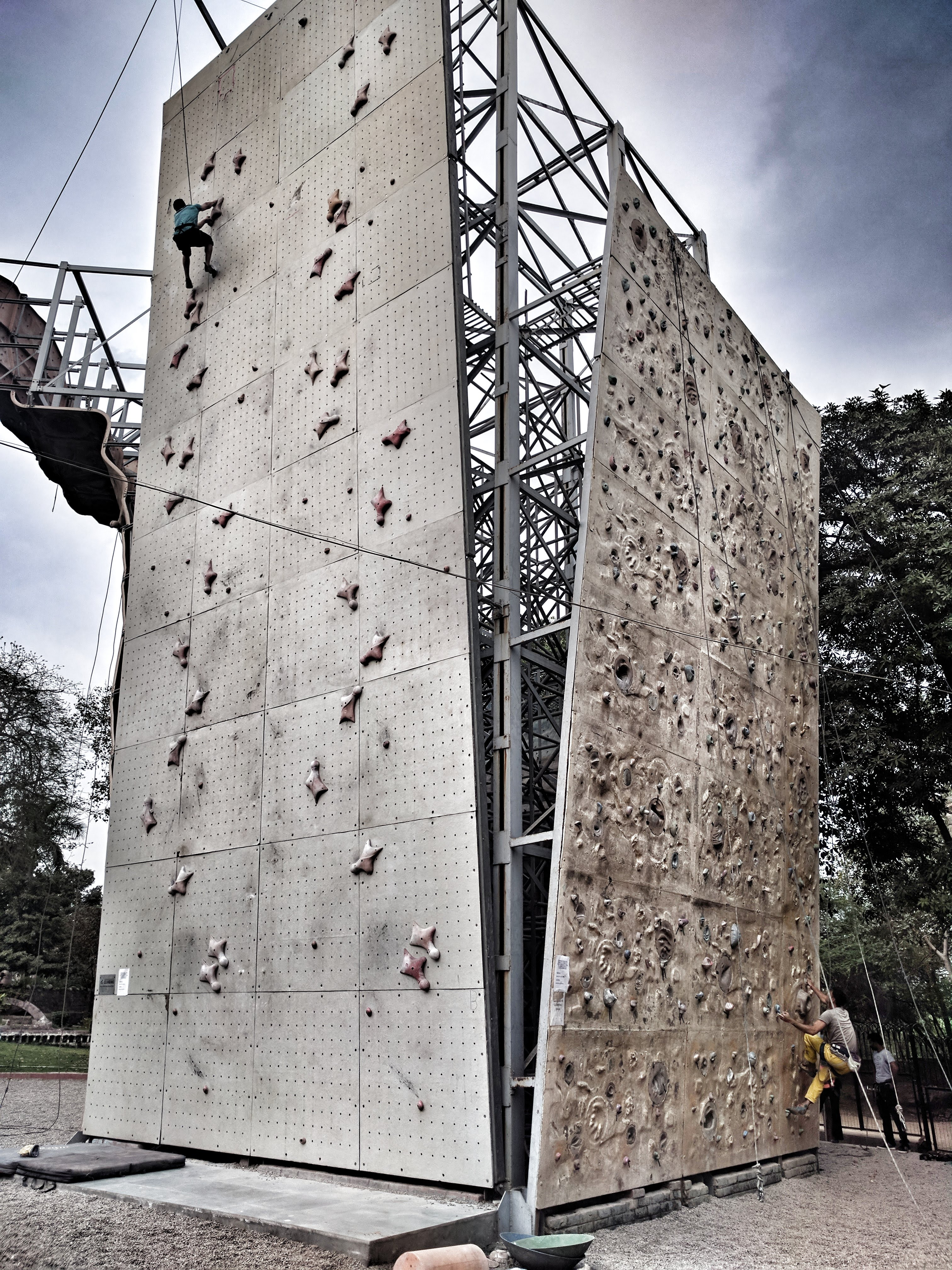
Climbing walls at the Indian Mountaineering Foundation center in New Delhi

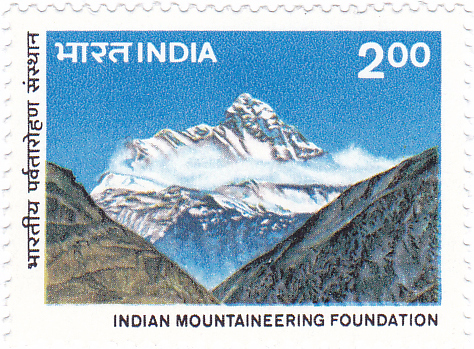
1983 stamp dedicated to the 25th anniversary of the Indian Mountaineering Foundation

=== List of National Sports award recipients in Mountaineering, showing the year, award, and gender ===
Year	Recipient	Award	Gender
1965	H. P. S. Ahluwalia	Arjuna Award (Group)	Male
1965	Harsh Vardhan Bahuguna	Arjuna Award (Group)	Male
1965	C. Balakrishanan	Arjuna Award (Group)	Male
1965	G. S. Bhangu	Arjuna Award (Group)	Male
1965	A. K. Chakravarty	Arjuna Award (Group)	Male
1965	Avtar Singh Cheema	Arjuna Award (Group)	Male
1965	Nawang Gombu	Arjuna Award (Group)	Male
1965	Sonam Gyatso	Arjuna Award (Group)	Male
1965	J. C. Joshi	Arjuna Award (Group)	Male
1965	Ang Kami	Arjuna Award (Group)	Male
1965	Mohan Singh Kohli	Arjuna Award (Group)	Male
1965	Narendra Kumar	Arjuna Award (Group)	Male
1965	Mulkh Raj	Arjuna Award (Group)	Male
1965	B. N. Rana	Arjuna Award (Group)	Male
1965	Harish Chandra Singh Rawat	Arjuna Award (Group)	Male
1965	B. P. Singh	Arjuna Award (Group)	Male
1965	Gurdial Singh	Arjuna Award (Group)	Male
1965	D. V. Telang	Arjuna Award (Group)	Male
1965	Chandra Prakash Vohra	Arjuna Award (Group)	Male
1965	Sonam Wangyal	Arjuna Award (Group)	Male
1981	Chandraprabha Aitwal	Arjuna Award	Female
1981	Harshwanti Bisht	Arjuna Award	Female
1981	B. S. Sandhu	Arjuna Award	Male
1981	Rekha Sharma	Arjuna Award	Female
1984	D. K. Khullar	Arjuna Award	Male
1984	Bachendri Pal	Arjuna Award	Female
1985	Phu Dorjee	Arjuna Award	Male
