= Competition climbing in India =

Sport Climbing in India
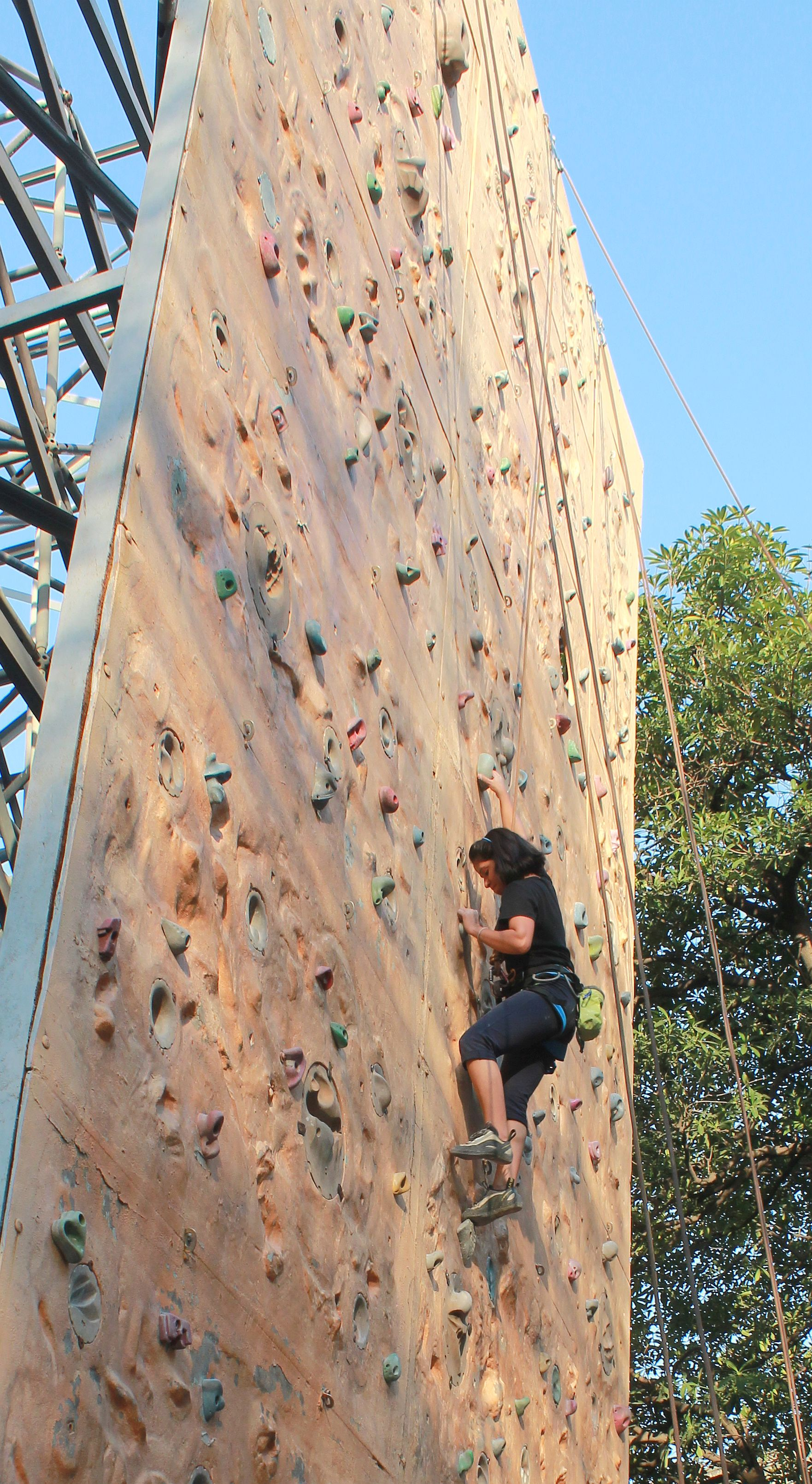
- Top roping on a climbing wall at the Indian Mountaineering Foundation, Delhi
- Governing body: Sport Climbing in India

Sport climbing was introduced in India in 1991. It is governed by the Indian Mountaineering Foundation (IMF).^{[1]} A founder member of International Federation of Sport Climbing(now, World Climbing). Col.Vijay Singh, VSM is the president and Shri. Keerthi Pais is the secretary of IMF.

Pune, Kolkata, Delhi, Jamshedpur, Jammu and Bangalore are prominent with athletes participating in competition climbing in India.^{[2]} The Indian Mountaineering Foundation, The Nehru Institute of Mountaineering, Jawahar Institute of Mountaineering, National institute of Mountaineering and Allied Sports and General Thimayya National Academy of Adventure conducts short term courses in Sport Climbing.^{[3]}

== Indian competition climbers ==
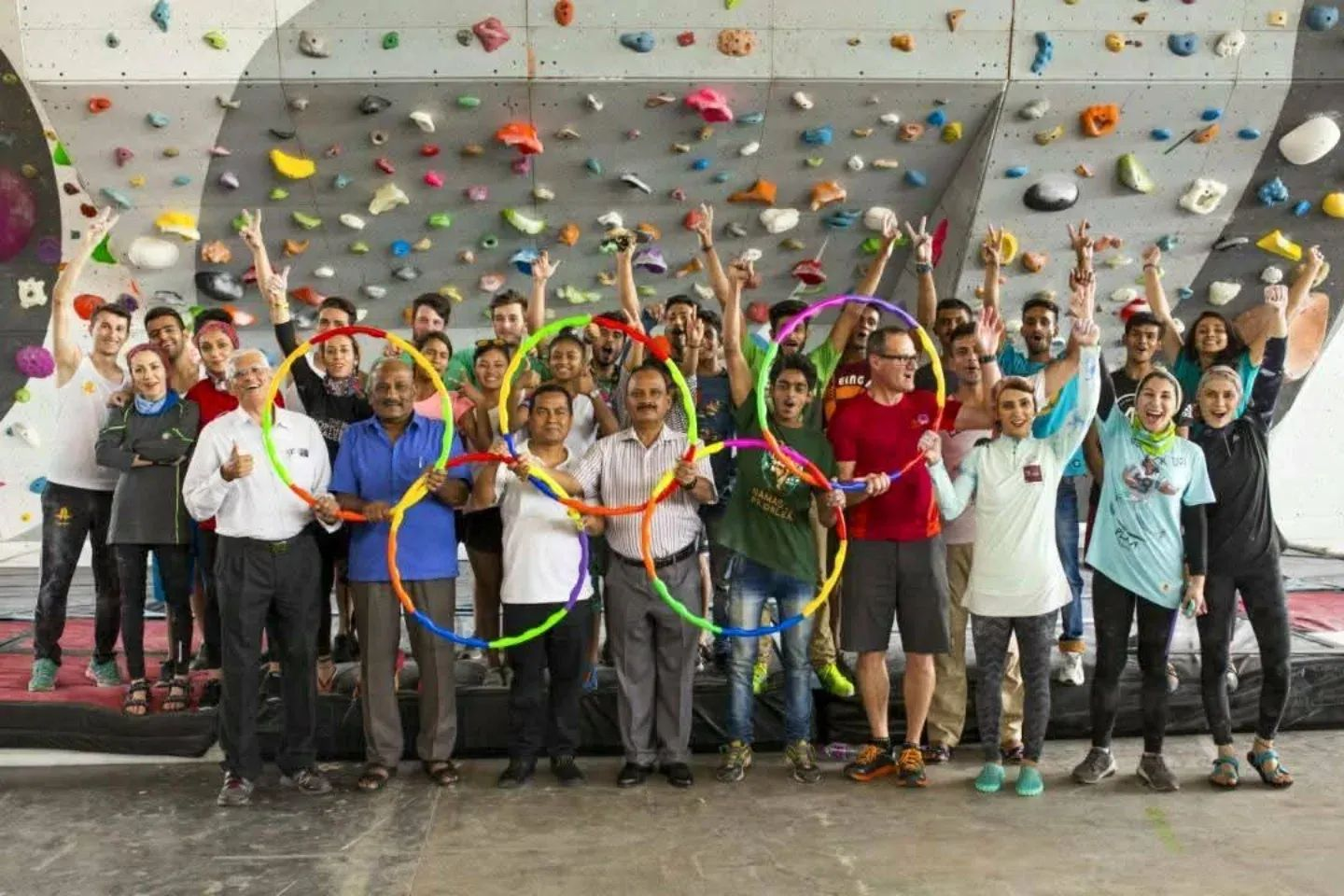
Indian Sport Climbing Team and international climbers during a World Cup event in Navi Mumbai

India has bagged 67 international medals in the last 30 years. The recent being, 7 medals at Asian K(U15) Championship in December 2025. At the world ranking at the end of December 2025, Bharath Periera is ranked 68 in Boulder and Joga Purty is ranked 68 in Speed. They are the highest-ranked Indian competition climbers. Deepu Mallesh (5.31 Sec)and Joga Purty(7.88 Sec) hold the national record in speed climbing.

== Asian Games ==
India sent a seven-member sport climbing contingent to the 2023 Asian Games in Hangzhou, China. Bharath Periera, Aman Verma, Dhiraj Birajdar, Shivpreet Pannu,Anisha Verma and Shivani Charak participated in the Asian Games. However, the athletes did not win any podium places.
