= India–United States espionage on Nanda Devi =

Failed CIA mission

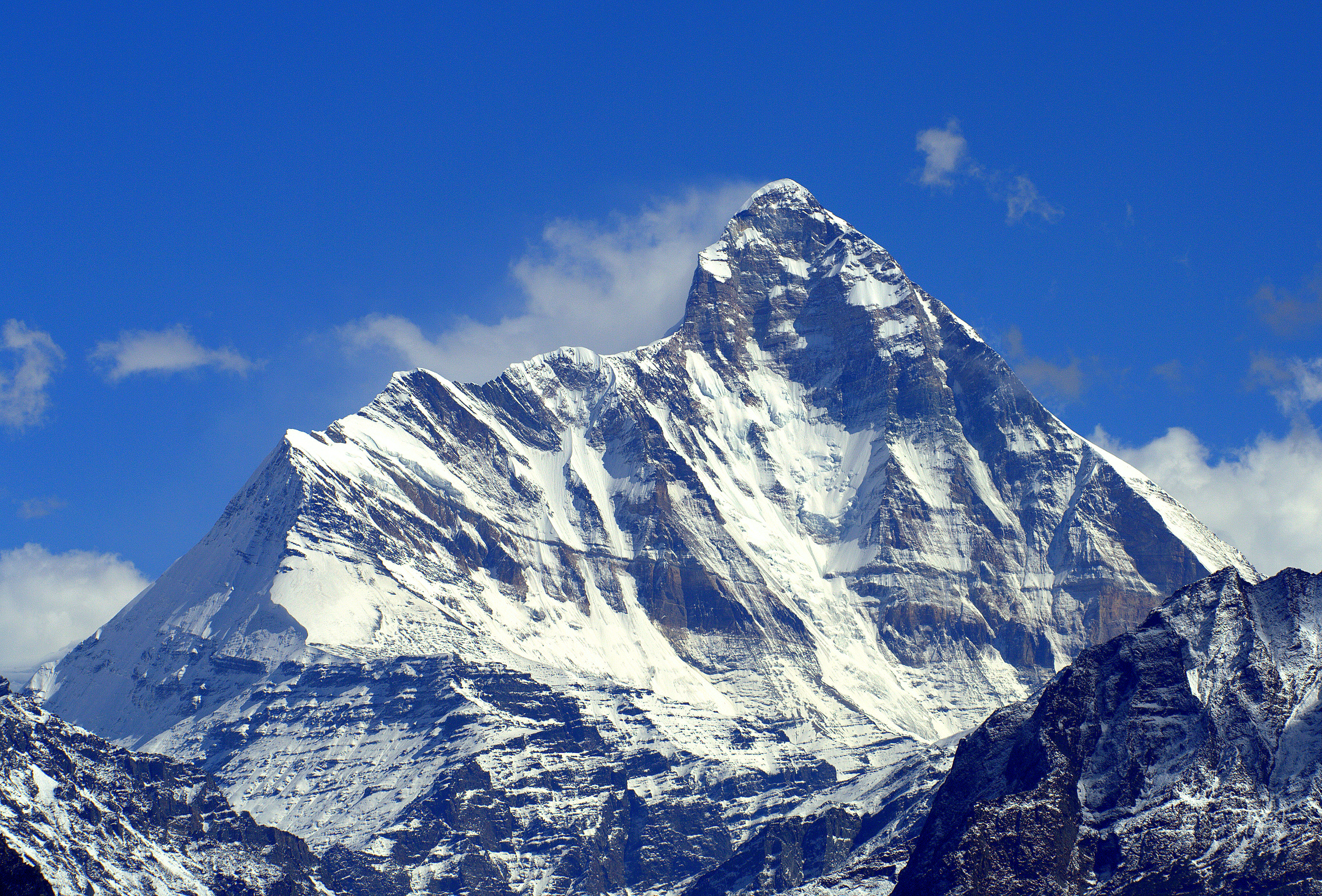
- Type: Spy mission
- Location: Nanda Devi, Uttarakhand, India
- Planned: 1965
- Planned by: Central Intelligence Agency and Intelligence Bureau
- Date: October 1965
- Executed by: Central Intelligence Agency
- Outcome: Mission failed Plutonium generator lost

India–United States espionage on Nanda Devi was a series of attempts by the United States Central Intelligence Agency (CIA) and the Indian Intelligence Bureau (IB) to spy on ballistic missile testing being conducted at Lop Nur in Xinjiang, China. The agencies cooperated in October 1965 in a failed attempt to install a SNAP-19C plutonium-238 radioisotope thermoelectric generator-powered (RTG-powered) remote sensing station on the peak of Nanda Devi in the Garhwal Himalayas to gather signals intelligence via telemetry from missiles during their tests.

The mission was aborted during a strong blizzard, and the generator was lost. Three recovery attempts failed, leading to fears of radioactive contamination of the Ganges or repurposing for a dirty bomb. Another CIA RTG-powered mountaintop device installed from spring 1967 to 1968 melted down into the ice, blocking its signal-gathering. A third device was successful from 1973 but quickly made obsolete by reconnaissance satellites.

== The mission ==
In 1965, the Pentagon and the CIA were worried about the development of China's nuclear weapons program. The Vietnam War was ramping up and the United States had no intelligence data to counter any Chinese threat. The Chinese were conducting nuclear tests in secretive facilities, most prominently the Lop Nur site in eastern Xinjiang, across the Tibetan Plateau from the Indian border.

Two years prior, a top US air force officer led a successful expedition to the summit of Mount Everest. He suggested that the Pentagon should recruit the hardy Sherpas to install a remote sensing station on the summit. But this idea ran into some problem as Mount Everest also bordered China. The plan then shifted to placing the equipment on Mount Kanchenjunga, but left both IB and CIA Agents unsatisfied with the higher altitude and execution strategy. After consultations with the Indian authorities, the Pentagon arrived at a plan to install a remote sensing station on the summit of Nanda Devi within Indian territory at an altitude of 25,645 feet (7,817 m).

The members of the CIA / Indian Intelligence Bureau mission were tasked with installing an 8–10 feet high antenna, two transceiver sets, and a plutonium-238–powered SNAP-19C radioisotope thermoelectric generator and its seven plutonium capsules.

== Team members ==
Manmohan Singh Kohli was the team leader. He recruited the Indian mountaineers for the mission, including several from the successful 1965 Indian Everest Expedition which he had led just a few months earlier: Sonam Gyatso, Harish Rawat, Sonam Wangyal, Gurcharan Singh Bhangu, all officers in the Indo-Tibetan Border Police, and the Sherpa Phu Dorjee Sherpa. About fourteen other sherpas were recruited, including Pasang Dawa Lama; several were 'later absorbed in Indian para-military organisations'.

Barry Bishop recruited the American mountaineers who joined the team on Nanda Devi or Nanda Kot. Several of them had been members of the 1963 American Mount Everest expedition along with Bishop: Lute Jerstad, Barry Prather, Barry Corbet and Dave Dingman; the other three were Tom Frost, Robert Schaller and Sandy Bill. Bishop himself was not part of the team on the mountain, having lost his toes to frostbite on Mount Everest, but he was one of the people who met the Indian team when they travelled to the US for training on Denali in summer 1965.

== Initial timeline ==
In July 1965, Kohli and the team members from India flew to the US to undertake training and familiarisation on Denali. They returned to India in August, and by mid-September 1965 they were at the base-camp on Nanda Devi with the American climbers Lute Jerstad, Tom Frost and Sandy Bill (Schaller had to pull out due to an injury). The team was flown by helicopter to the Himalayas in September, with both US agents and IB Sherpas who were not acclimatized to the cold air and high altitude. A series of camps were established and stocked in the face of changeable weather. The plan was for a team of Sherpas to deliver the cargo to the summit from the fourth camp, they would then return and a second team, with two Indian and two American climbers, would ascend to the summit and assemble the device. It was 300 metres from the fourth camp to the summit. When the mission reached camp IV, a blizzard hit, and on 16 October 1965 Kohli decided the team should turn back, abandoning the generator. The device was hooked in a crevice and anchored, and the climbers headed back to the base. No more progress was possible that season.

== Follow up on Nanda Devi ==
In the spring of May 1966, a follow-up Indian expedition was sent to Camp IV to recover the device and its plutonium capsules. The expedition failed to find any signs of the generator and its capsules. Later, an American team of mountaineers (Frost, Dingman and Schaller) joined those attempting to recover the device. One of the members of the team, Dingman, said that they had scanned the area of Nanda Devi with neutron detectors but no evidence of plutonium was found. The team concluded that the device and its capsules were carried downhill by a landslide. It has also been claimed that the heat emitted from the generator may have melted the surrounding ice, burying it deeper into the glaciers near the mountain.

Two ascents of Nanda Devi were made during the search operation. On 8 June, Gurcharan Bhangu reached the summit with Sherpa Tashi and on 20 August Rob Schaller made a solo ascent of the peak.

== Nanda Kot ==
In the light of the problems which had arisen when attempting to install the equipment on Nanda Devi, an alternative plan was devised which involved placing a device on the nearby Nanda Kot. In 1967 the Americans Frost, Prather, Schaller, Corbet and Curry, working with an Indian team comprising Wangyal, Rawat and Bhangu, installed a nuclear-powered signal device about 500 feet from the summit, at c. 22,000 ft (6,700 m). The device worked for a few months and confirmed that the Chinese did not, at that time, possess a long-range nuclear bomb.

After the device on Nanda Kot failed, a small team under Rawat was sent to Nanda Kot in the summer of 1968 to retrieve the sensor equipment. When they reached the site there was no sign of the equipment so they dug a few feet and discovered a semi-spherical cave with the hot generator at the centre. The heat from the generator had melted the snow up to eight feet in all directions.

== Political exposure of the mission ==
The mission was first publicly exposed in an April 1978 article in Outside magazine written by Howard Kohn. In April of that year, questions were asked in Congress. Less than a week later Indian parliamentarians raised the matter in the Indian Parliament forcing Prime Minister Morarji Desai to provide a formal account of the affair.

Desai appointed a scientific committee to "study and assess the problem with the help of all possible expert advice, to recommend such further action as may be considered necessary to safeguard against future hazards to the environment and to the people". This committee, chaired by Atma Ram, delivered its final report in 1978; its principal recommendations were periodic monitoring of the environment near Nanda Devi to detect any radioactive radiation in the air, water and soil, and the development of new techniques for locating the device.

== Claims and beliefs ==
Broughton Coburn, author of the book The Vast Unknown: America's First Ascent of Everest, claims that the Indian intelligence had secretly hiked up there before that spring mission and retrieved the device, presumably in order to study it and possibly gather the plutonium.

The local inhabitants of the region claim that due to the presence of the nuclear capsule there has been an increased number of floods and ice calving. Residents and local leaders have also questioned whether the lost generator could be contaminating the headwaters of the Ganges River with radiation.
