= H. P. S. Ahluwalia =

Indian mountaineer (1936–2022)

Major H. P. S. Ahluwalia
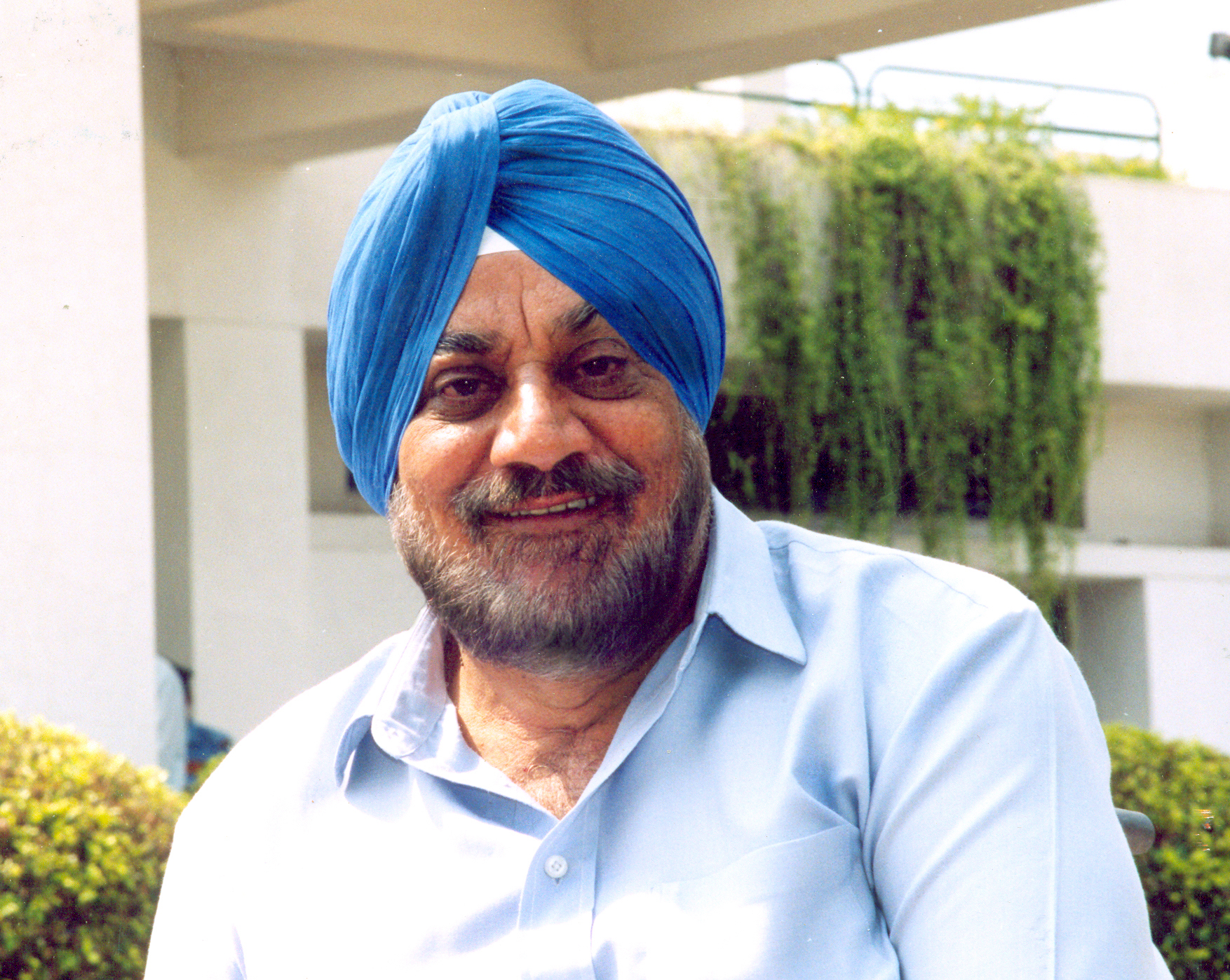
- Born: 6 November 1936; Sialkot, Punjab Province, British Raj (present-day Punjab, Pakistan)
- Died: 14 January 2022 (aged 85); New Delhi, India
- Education: St. George's College, Mussoorie; College of Military Engineering, Pune
- Years active: 1995–2022
- Board member of: Ex Chairman, Indian Spinal Injuries Centre
- Spouse: Bholi Ahluwalia
- Children: One
- Parent(s): Father- Mr. Sarjit Singh; Mother- Harbans Kaur
- Awards: Padma Bhushan; Padma Shri; Arjuna Award
- Military career
- Allegiance: India
- Branch: Indian Army
- Service years: 1958-1968
- Rank: Major
- Service number: IC-11112
- Conflicts: Indo-Pakistani War of 1965

Hari Pal Singh Ahluwalia (6 November 1936 – 14 January 2022) was an Indian mountaineer, author, social worker and Indian Ordnance Factories Service (IOFS) officer. During his career he made contributions in the fields of adventure, sports, environment, disability and social work. He is one of six Indian men and the twenty first man in the world to climb Mount Everest. On 29 May 1965, 12 years to the day from the first ascent of Mount Everest, he made the summit with the fourth and final successful attempt of the 1965 Indian Everest Expedition along with H. C. S. Rawat and Phu Dorjee Sherpa. This was the first time three climbers stood on the summit together.

Following his advanced training at the Himalayan Mountaineering Institute, Darjeeling, he climbed extensively in Sikkim, Nepal. The 1965 Indian Army expedition was the first successful Indian Expedition to Everest which put 9 mountaineers on top, a record which lasted 17 years, and was led by Mohan Singh Kohli. He along with Avtar Singh Cheema, Nawang Gombu Sherpa, Sonam Gyatso, Sonam Wangyal, Chandra Prakash Vohra, Ang Kami Sherpa, Harish Chandra Singh Rawat and Phu Dorjee Sherpa summited the peak in 1965 and became the first Indians to successfully climb Mount Everest. During the Indo-Pakistani War of 1965, he received a bullet injury to his spine, after which he used a wheelchair. He was the Chairman of Indian Spinal Injuries Centre. He has written thirteen books and has also produced a serial, Beyond Himalaya, which has been telecast internationally on Discovery and National Geographic channels.

== Early life ==
Hari Pal Singh Ahluwalia was born on 6 November 1936 and brought up in Shimla along with his two sisters and two younger brothers. His father was employed as a Civil Engineer in the Indian Central Public Works Department.

For his academic career he went to St Joseph's Academy, Dehradun and St. George's College, Mussoorie. There, he discovered his interest in photography and rock climbing. Along with graduation, his interest in rock-climbing increased. Some of the places where Ahluwalia did his rock climbing are Garhwal, Sikkim, Nepal, Ladakh, and of course Mount Everest. He graduated with a bachelor's degree in Electrical and Mechanical engineering from the College of Military Engineering, Pune in 1964.

== Military career ==
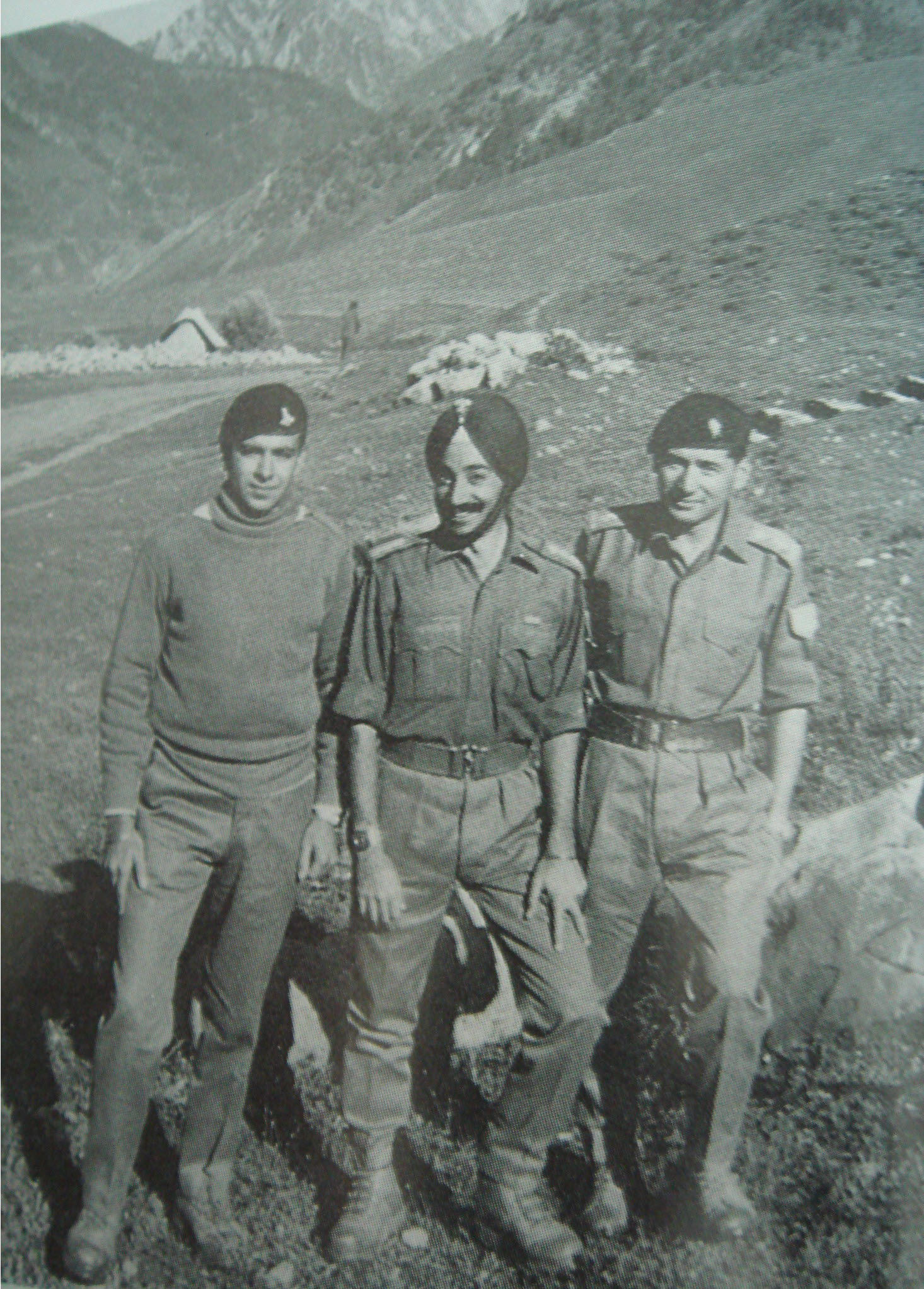
Major Ahluwalia (center) in his Army days

After his graduation Ahluwalia joined the Indian Army as an officer, receiving a commission as a second lieutenant in the Army Electrical-Mechanical Engineering branch on 14 December 1958. He was promoted to lieutenant on 14 December 1960 and to captain on 14 December 1964. Seeing action during the 1965 war with Pakistan, he was wounded by a bullet in his spine, after which he used a wheelchair. He received an early discharge from the Army on 8 January 1968, with the honorary rank of major.

== Expeditions ==
After treatment at Stoke Mandeville Hospital in England, he organised the first Ski Expedition to Mount Trisul, the first Trans-Himalaya Motor Expedition (1983), and the Central Asia Cultural Expedition (1994).

== Indian Spinal Injuries Centre ==
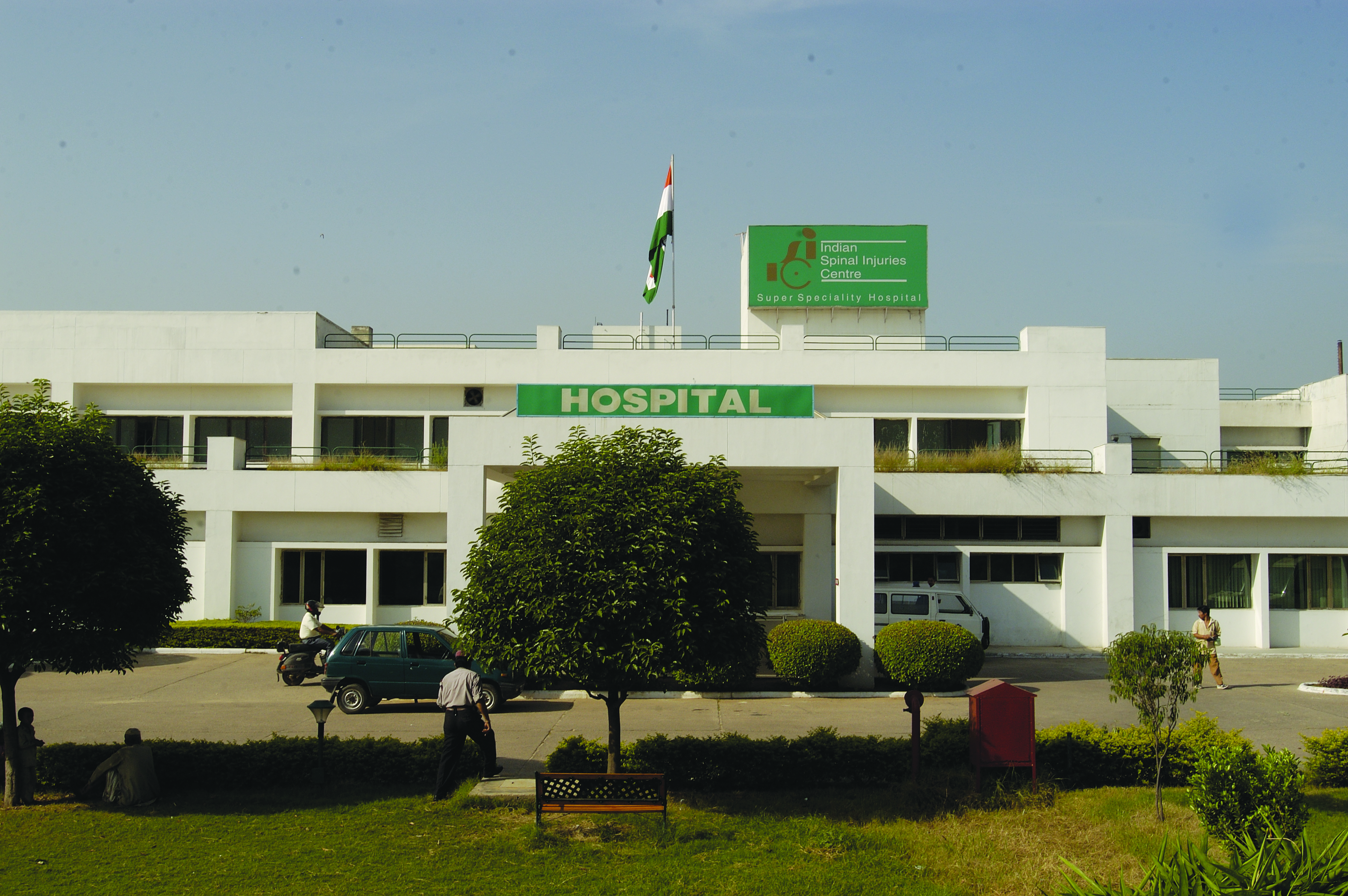
Indian Spinal Injuries Centre

To treat spinal injuries, Ahluwalia, with the support of his friends, set up the Indian Spinal Injuries Centre (ISIC) in Vasant Kunj, New Delhi, India in 1993. He also served as an IOFS officer.

== Personal life and death ==
Ahluwalia died in Delhi on 14 January 2022, at the age of 85.

== Bibliography ==
- Higher than Everest
- The Summit Within
- Eternal Himalaya
- Beyond the Himalayas
- Everest- Where the Snow never melts
- Hermit Kingdom Ladakh
- Ladakh Nubra The Forbidden Valley
- Tracing Marco Polo's Journey

== Awards ==
=== Medal bar ===

Padma Bhushan	Padma Shri	Wound Medal	
Samanya Seva Medal	Samar Seva Star	Raksha Medal	9 Years Long Service Medal

=== National Awards ===
- Arjuna Award-1965
- Padma Shri-1965
- Padma Bhushan-2002
- Tenzing Norgay National Adventure Award for lifetime achievement-29 August 2009
- National Award for the Welfare of People with Disabilities-3 December 1998
- Order of the Khalsa (Nishan-e- Khalsa) Tercentenary of the Birth of Khalsa

=== International Awards ===
- FRGS – Fellow of the Royal Geographical Society (United Kingdom)
- Fellowship conferred for significant contribution to studies and literature written on Environment and Adventure
- CONDOR-DE-ORO – A high Argentinian honour given for overall contribution to adventure writing / participation in Adventure Sports.
- Advisor/Consultant to the Argentina Everest Expedition
- World Health Initiative for Peace Award, 29 July 2014

== Gallery ==
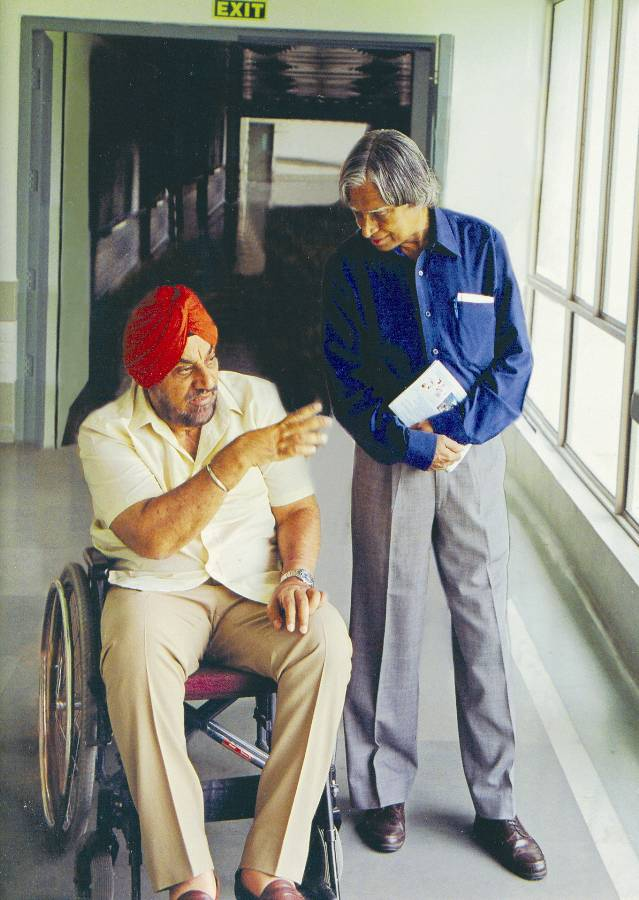
Ahluwalia with Dr APJ Abdul Kalam

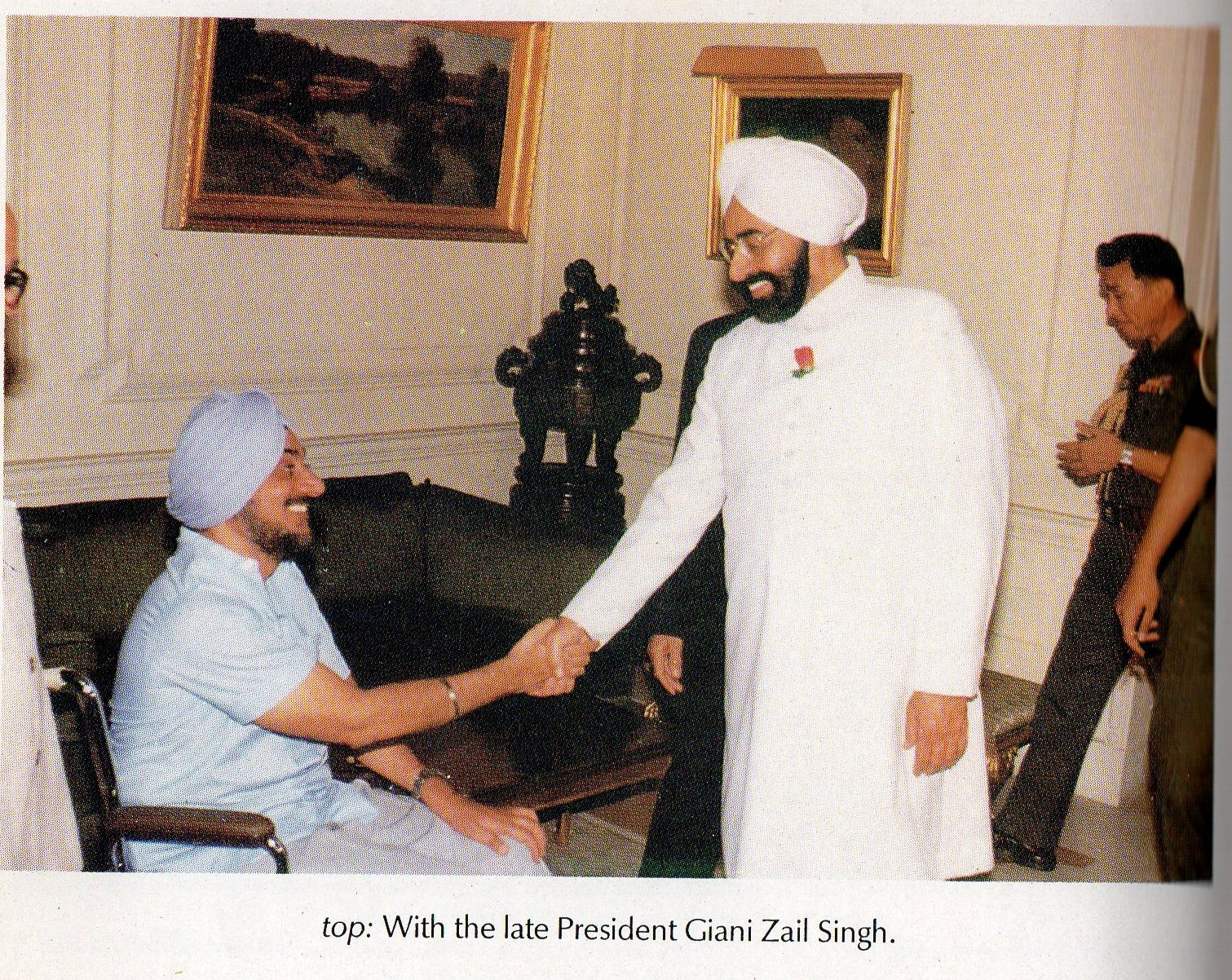
Ahluwalia with Zail Singh

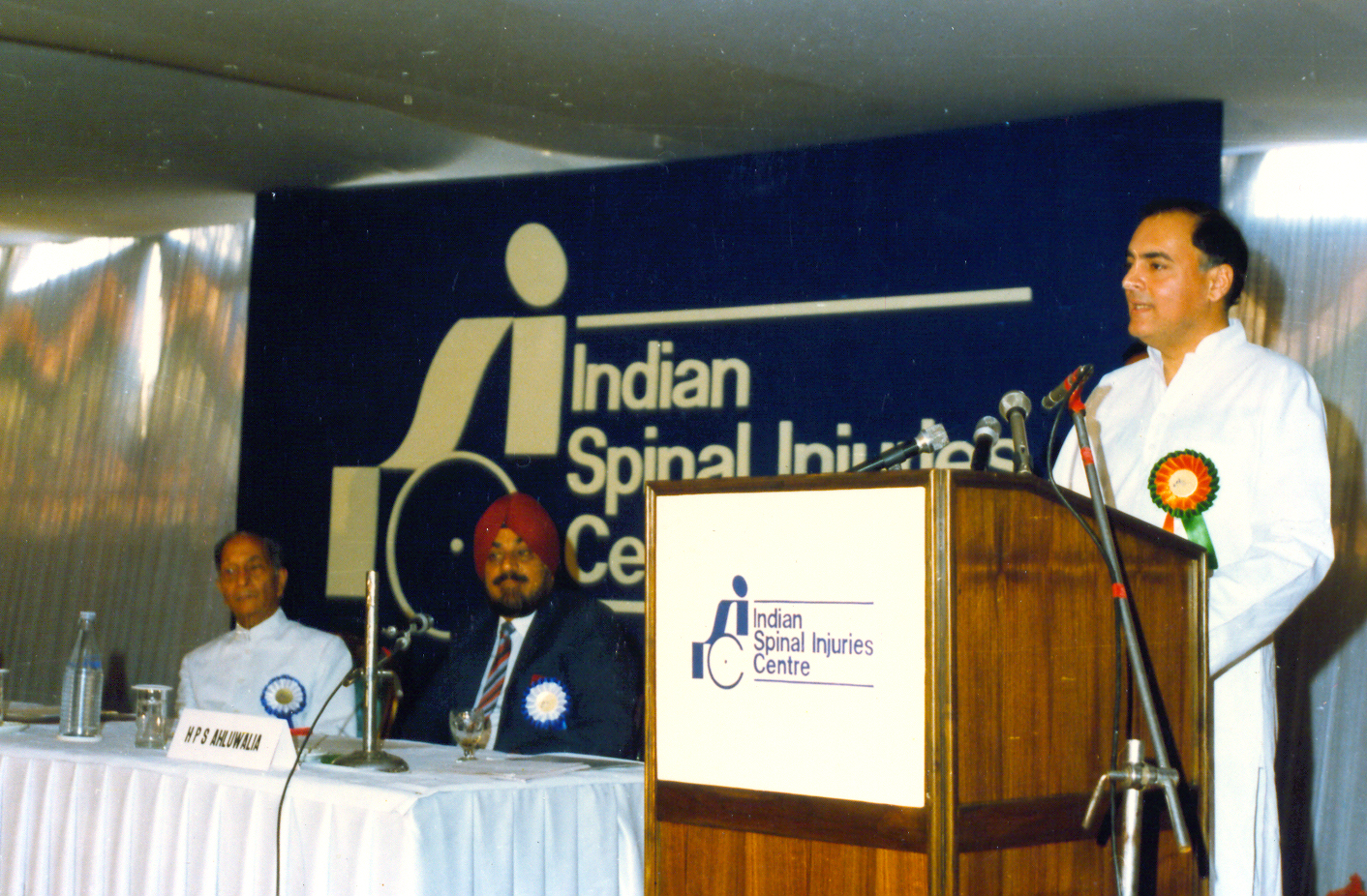
Ahluwalia with former Prime Minister of India - Rajiv Gandhi

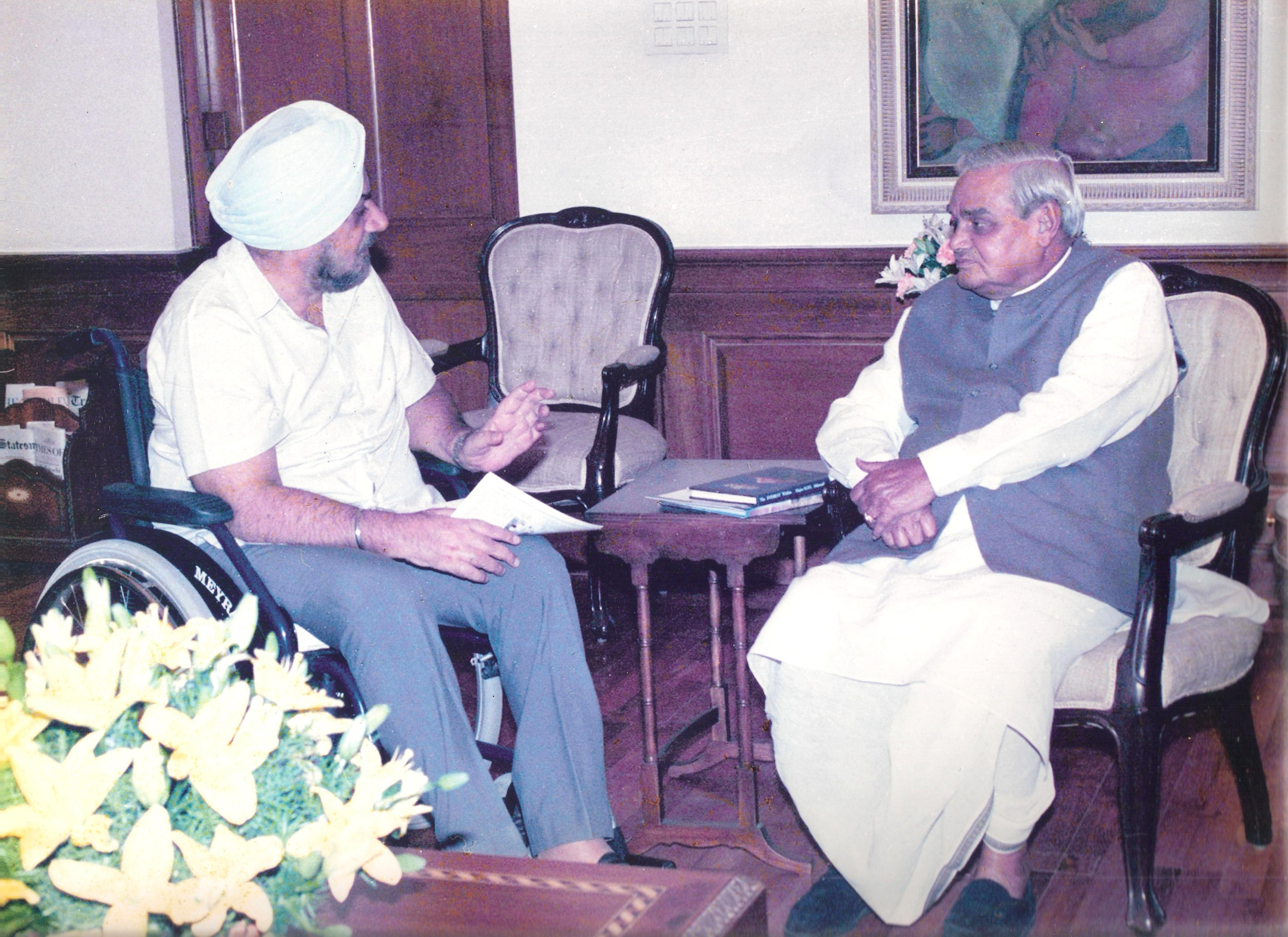
Ahluwalia with former Prime Minister of India - Atal Bihari Vajpayee

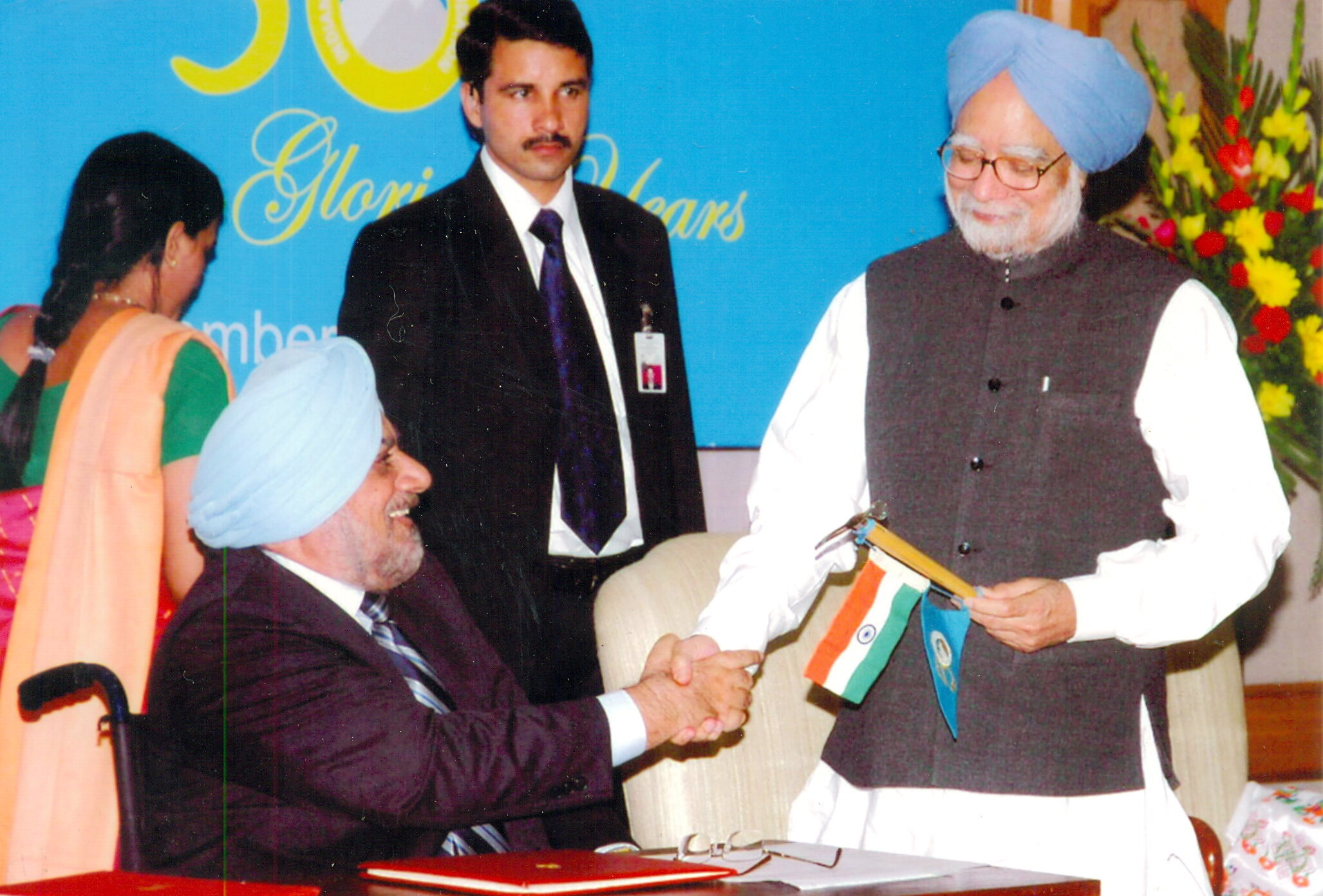
Ahluwalia with former Prime Minister of India - Manmohan Singh.

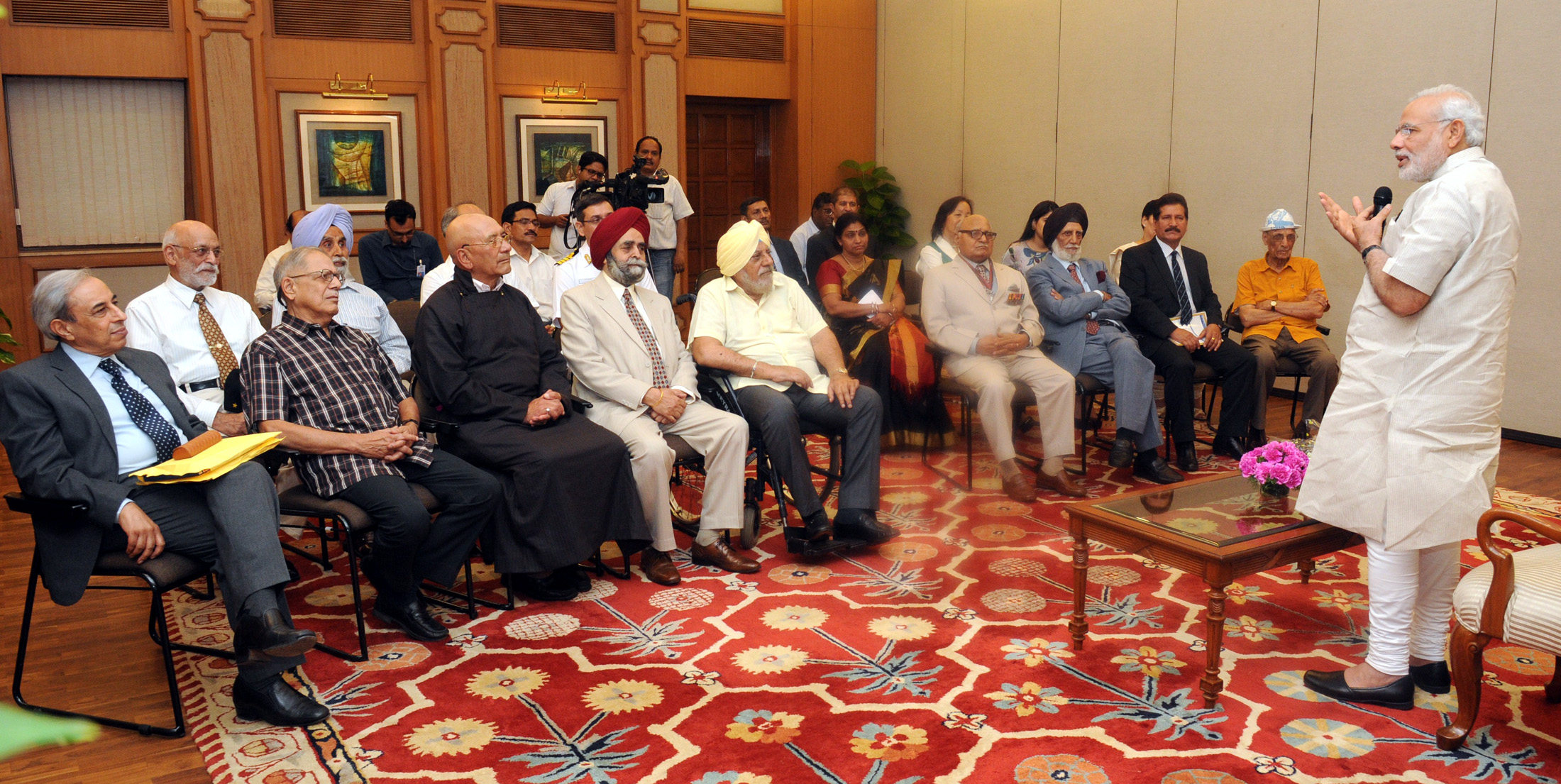
Prime Minister, Shri Narendra Modi meets the members of Indian Everest Expedition 1965 on the occasion of Golden Jubilee of this on 20 May 2015

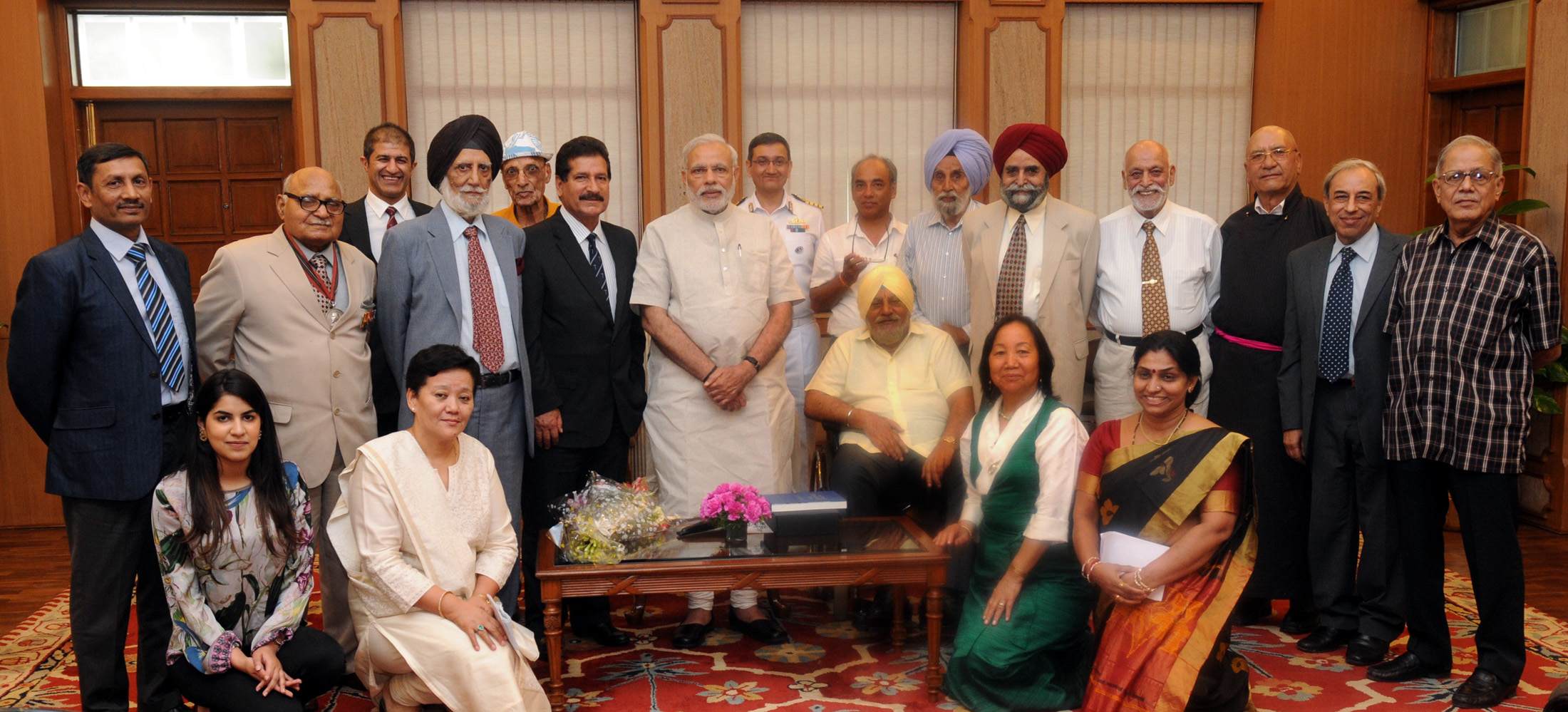
Prime Minister, Shri Narendra Modi meets the members of Indian Everest Expedition 1965 on the occasion of Golden Jubilee of this on 20 May 2015

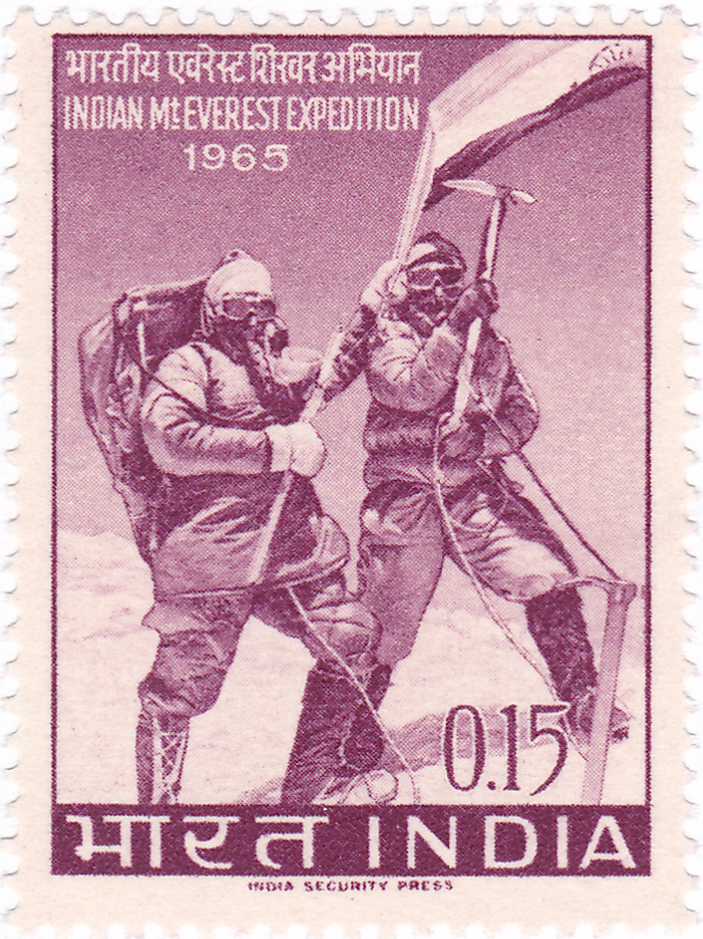
1965 Indian stamp dedicated to the 1965 Everest Expedition

== See also ==
- Indian summiters of Mount Everest - Year wise
- List of Mount Everest summiters by number of times to the summit
- List of Mount Everest records of India
- List of Mount Everest records
