= 1965 Indian Everest Expedition =

First successful Indian summit of Mount Everest

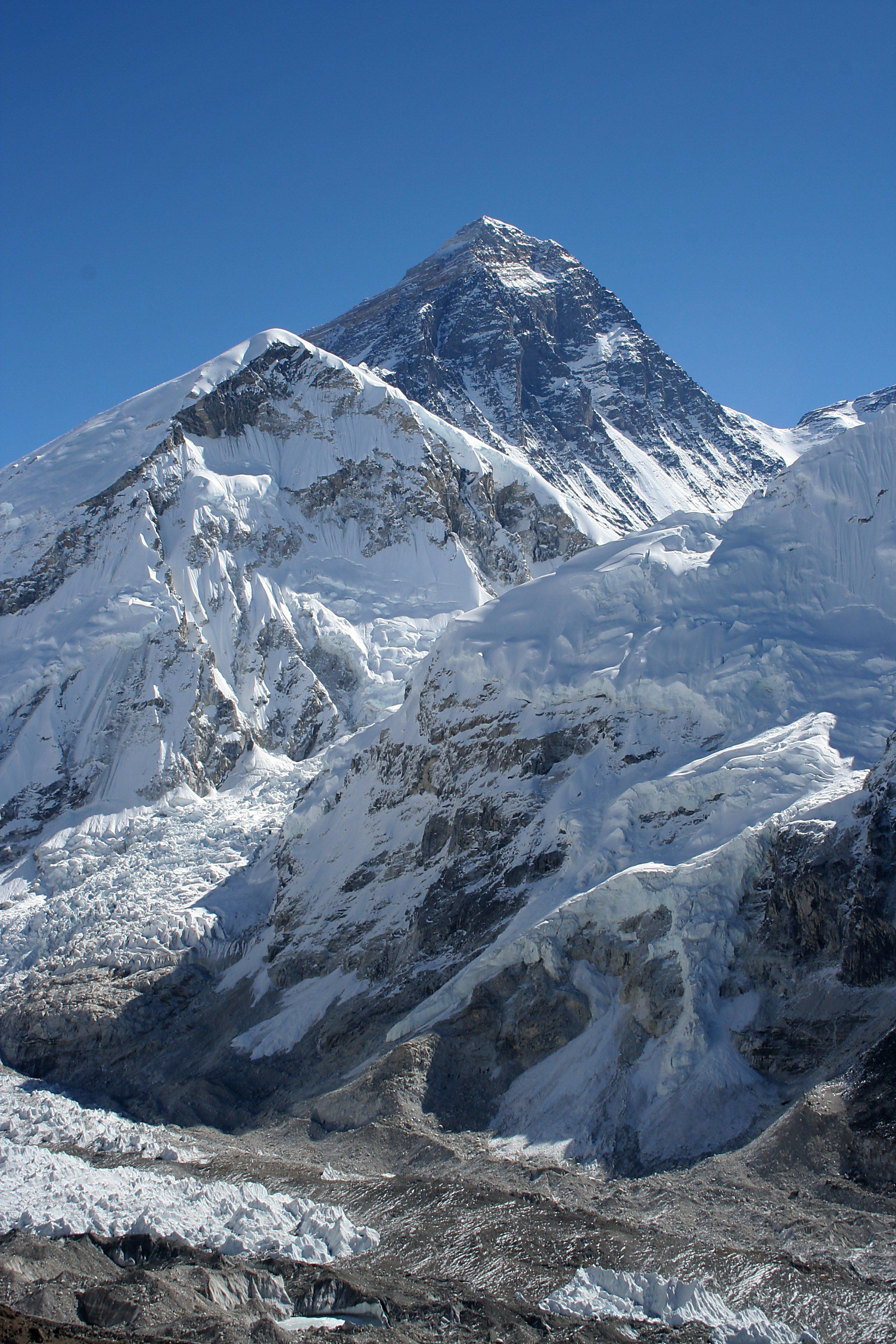
Mount Everest

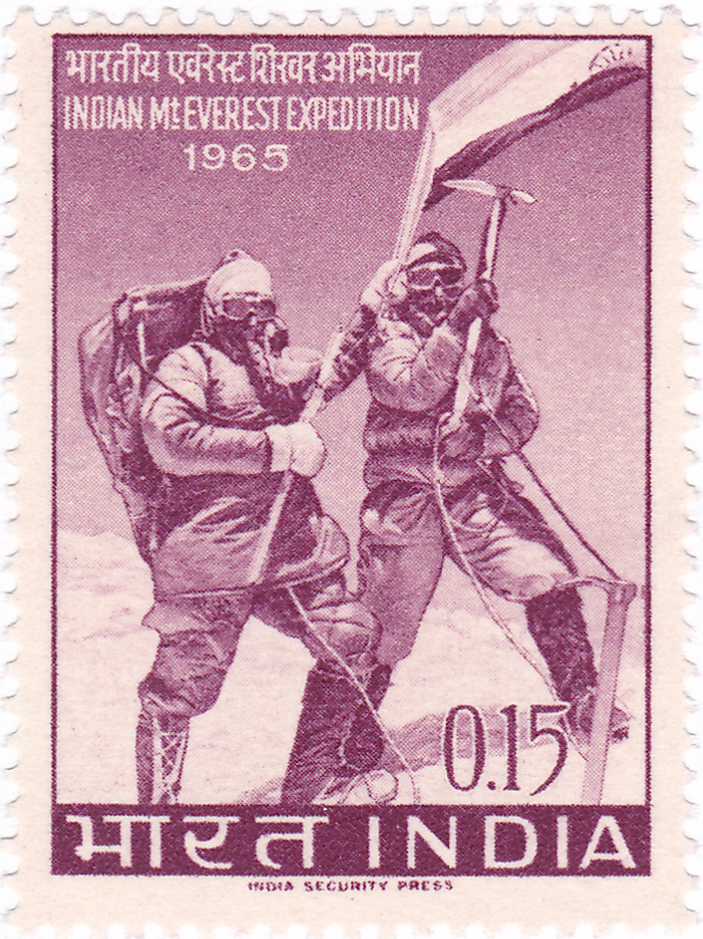
1965 Indian stamp dedicated to the 1965 Everest Expedition

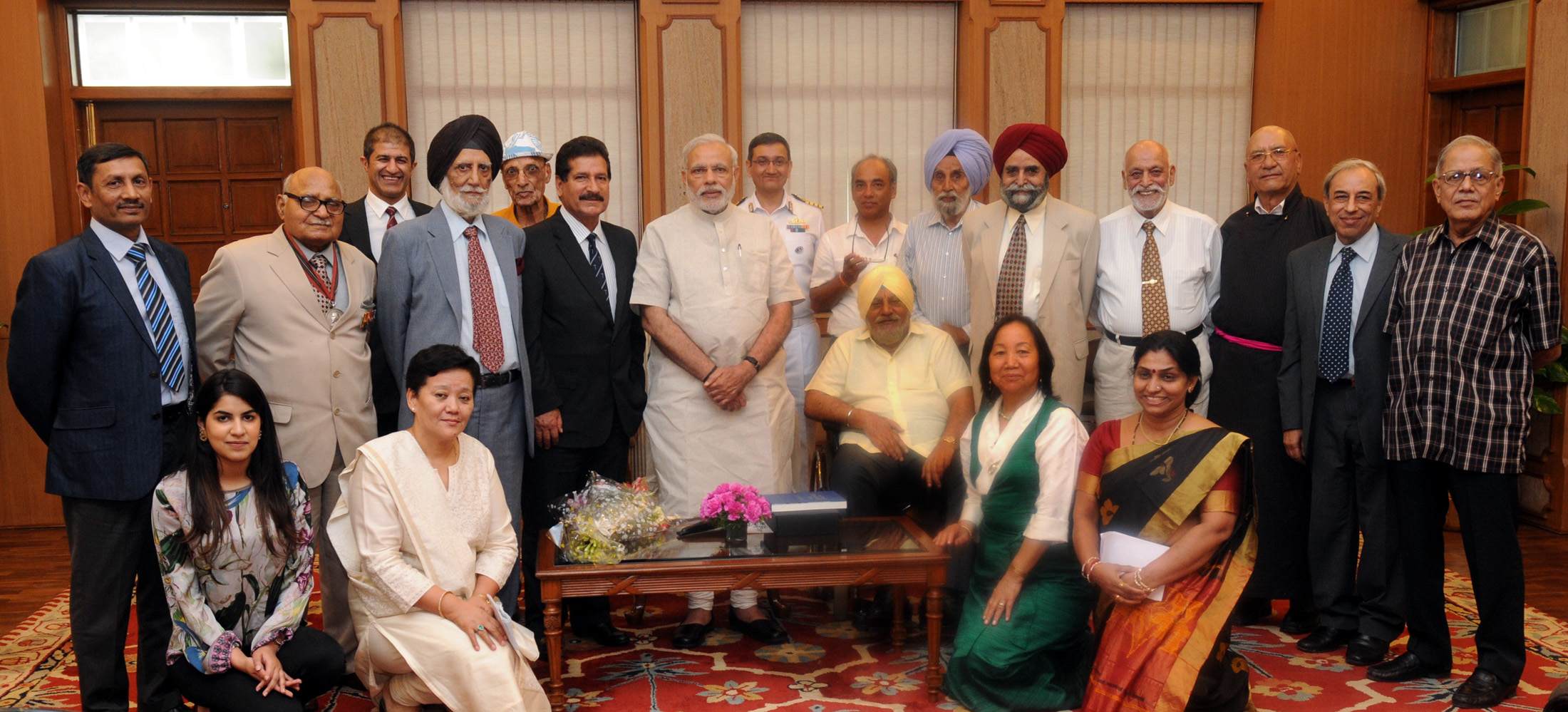
The Prime Minister, Shri Narendra Modi meets the members of 1965 expedition in New Delhi on 20 May 2015, the 50th anniversary of the ascent

The 1965 Indian Everest Expedition reached the summit of Mount Everest on 20 May 1965. It was the first successful scaling of the mountain by an Indian climbing expedition.

After the first conquest of Mount Everest in 1953 by the New Zealander Edmund Hillary and Sherpa Tenzing Norgay, Indian military forces made several attempts to conquer the summit. The first expedition by the Indian Army, which was led by Brigadier Gyan Singh in 1960, failed. Climbers Colonel Narendra Kumar, Sonam Gyatso, and Sherpa Nawang Gombu reached 28,300 feet (8,600 m), just 700 feet (210 m) from the summit, but had to turn back due to extremely bad weather. The second expedition by the Indian Army, led by Major John Diaz in 1962, also failed. Captain Mohan Singh Kohli, Sonam Gyatso, and Hari Dang got to almost 400 feet (120 m) below the summit at 28,600 feet (8,700 m), but also had to give up due to bad weather. Mohan Singh Kohli was a member of both these expeditions.

== Preparation ==
In 1965, the third Indian expedition, which was led by Mohan Singh Kohli and his deputy Colonel Narendra "Bull" Kumar, included 21 core members of the expedition, and around 50 climbing sherpas. The mission was sponsored by the Indian Mountaineering foundation. The team started their journey from New Delhi on 21 February and reached on Jaynagar railway station in Bihar, the Indo-Nepal border on 24 February. They arranged for 25 tons of materials for the mission from various cities of India, including food, cloths, sleeping tents, oxygen cylinders and mountaineering equipment. All materials were carried from Jaynagar railway station to base camp by 800 porters including women. The initial attempt was at the end of April and due to bad weather they came back to base camp and wait two weeks for better weather. Towards the end of May, expedition members scaled Mount Everest in four successive attempts, putting nine climbers on to the summit and so setting a world record which was unbroken until the 1978 German-French Expedition 13 years later.

== Reaching the summit ==
India became the fourth country to scale Mount Everest. On 20 May 1965, Lt Col Avatar. S. Cheema and Nawang Gombu Sherpa reached the summit of Mount Everest, becoming the first Indians to do so. This was the second time that Nawang Gombu Sherpa had climbed Mount Everest. The first was with an American expedition in 1963. He became the first person to climb the mountain twice.

Two days later, on 22 May, Sonam Gyatso and Sonam Wangyal reached the summit and C. P. Vohra, Ang Kami Sherpa reached it on 24 May.

On 29 May, 12 years to the day from the first ascent of Mount Everest, Major H. P. S. Ahluwalia, H. C. S. Rawat, Phu Dorjee Sherpa reached the summit. This was the first time three climbers had stood on the summit together.

In all, eleven people were scheduled to climb the mountain in five attempts, but Captain HV Bahuguna and Major BP Singh were forced to retreat due to physical difficulties.

== Reception and honours ==
Mohan Singh Kohli is best known as leader of the Indian Everest Expedition 1965. The achievement electrified the nation; people danced in the streets. Nine climbers reached the summit, creating a world record that India held for 13 years. On return of the team from Nepal to India, acting Prime Minister Gulzarilal Nanda headed the reception at the airport (Prime Minister Lal Bahadur Shastri was abroad).

The entire team were given an Arjuna Award. Three members, including the team leader, were awarded the Padma Bhushan and the leader and eight team members were given the Padma Shree.

Indira Gandhi paid tribute saying: “The record of Commander Kohli's expedition will find special mention in history. It was a masterpiece of planning, organisation, teamwork, individual effort and leadership”. She described the 1965 success as one of India's six major achievements after independence.

A full-length film on the expedition with music by Shankar Jaikishan was released all over India and abroad. The story of the achievement was serialized in several national newspapers and magazines. Mohan Singh Kohli and other members of the team were felicitated at Brussels, Paris, Geneva and Rome. Tenzing Norgay accompanied Captain Kohli to several countries. In India, Chief Ministers of almost all the states invited the team to their capitals and honoured them at state and civic receptions.

== Records of the expedition ==
- First Indian team to successfully climb the Everest
- First time three climbers stood on the summit together
- First time nine climbers reached the summit, setting a world record which India held for 13 years
- First man to climb Everest twice – Nawang Gombu Sherpa
- First time that the oldest (Sonam Gyatso at 42) and the youngest (Sonam Wangyal at 23) climbed Everest together
- First Nepalese to climb Everest – Phu Dorjee Sherpa

== Team ==
- Team leader Captain M S Kohli
- Deputy leader Colonel Narendra "Bull" Kumar
1. Avtar Singh Cheema
2. Nawang Gombu Sherpa
3. Sonam Gyatso
4. Sonam Wangyal
5. C. P. Vohra
6. Ang Kami
7. H. P. S. Ahluwalia
8. H. C. S. Rawat
9. Phu Dorjee Sherpa
10. Captain Harsh Vardhan Bahuguna
11. Major B P Singh
12. Gurdial Singh
13. Major Mulk Raj
14. Captain J C Joshi
15. Lt. B N Rana
16. Captain A K Chakravarty( Doctor)
17. Dr. D V Telang (Doctor)
18. G S Bhanghu (Wireless Operator)
19. C.Balakrishnan (Wireless Operator)
- Captain Soares (doctor) returned due to illness

== Sherpas ==
About 50 Sherpas participated in the mission. Many of them had previously participated in other Everest missions. One of the sherpas, Phu Dorjee Sherpa, reached the summit.

1. Ang tshering (Sirdar)
2. Phu Dorjee Sherpa (Assistant Sirdar)
3. General Thondup
4. Nawang Hilla
5. Dawa Norbu I
6. Ang Dava IV
7. Ila Tshering
8. Ang tshering II
9. Tenzing Nindra
10. Ang Nyima
11. Tenzing Gyatso
12. Nima Tenzing
13. Gunden
14. Passand Tendi
15. Mingma Tshering (Orderly of Captain M S Kohli)
16. Pemba Sunder
17. Sikhu Phorche
18. Dahnu
19. Lobsang Sherpa

== See also ==
- Indian summiters of Mount Everest - Year wise
- List of Mount Everest records of India
- List of Mount Everest records
- List of Mount Everest summiters by number of times to the summit
