= C. Balakrishnan (mountaineer) =

Indian mountaineer

C.Balakrishnan
- Born: Kerala, India
- Died: 9 September 2007; Pune
- Military career
- Rank: Havildar
- Awards: Arjuna Award

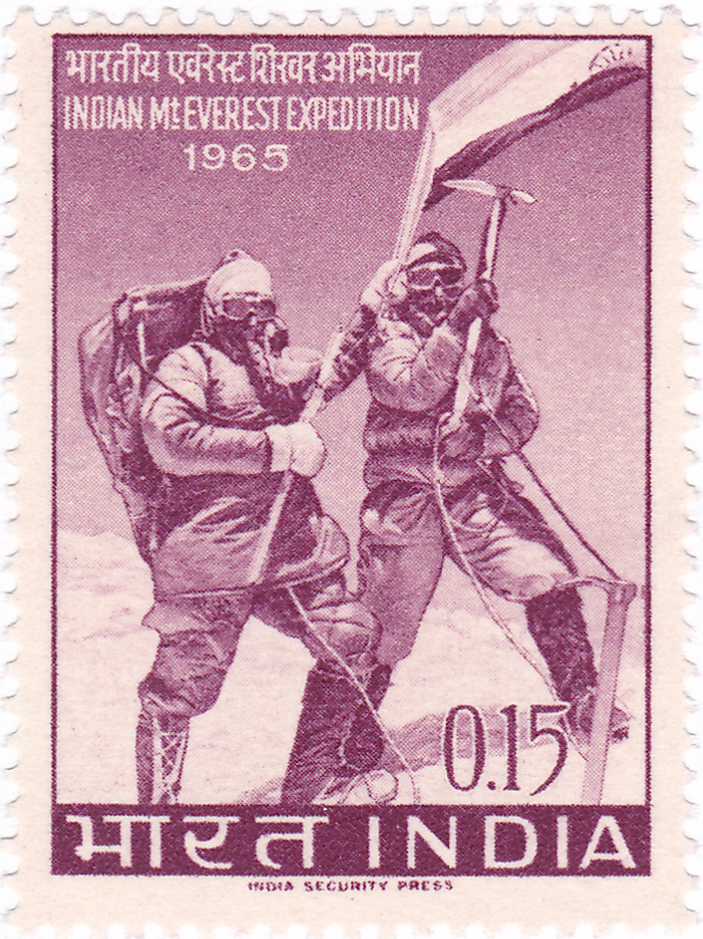
1965 Indian stamp dedicated to the 1965 Everest Expedition

C. Balakrishnan was an Indian Keralite mountaineer who was the member of the third Indian Everest expedition, led by Captain Mohan Singh Kohli in 1965 which was the first Indian successful Everest Expedition scaled the Mount Everest, consisted of 21 major expedition members and 50 Sherpas. He was the part of the first two Mount Everest expeditions by the Indian Army 1960 and 1962 was a wireless operator. In addition to mountain climbing, he won medal in the 100 m hurdles at the 1950 National Meet. In 1951, he finished fourth in the 400 m race at the first Asian Games held in Delhi. He played twice for Services in the Ranji Trophy first-class cricket championship.

== Honors and awards ==
He was awarded Arjuna Award, for his achievements. He was the first South Indian to be awarded the Arjuna Award.

== Personal life ==
He was a Havildar in Indian Army. He died on 9 September 2007 at his house in Pune. After his death, Kerala government built a home for his family at Ponganankattu, near Thrissur in 2016.

== See also ==
- Indian summiters of Mount Everest - Year wise
- List of Mount Everest records of India
- List of Mount Everest records
- List of Mount Everest summiters by number of times to the summit
