= Harish Chandra Singh Rawat =

Indian mountaineer

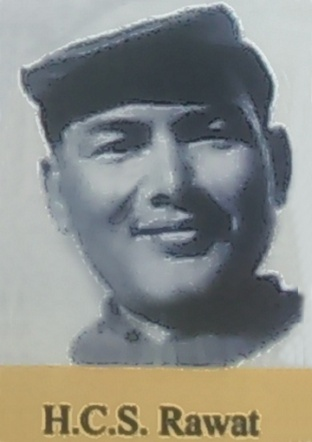
- Born: 3 July 1934; Munsiari, Uttrakhand, India
- Died: 20 January 2008 (aged 73)
- Military career
- Allegiance: India
- Branch: Sashastra Seema Bal
- Rank: Director (Training)
- Awards: Padma Shri; Arjuna Award

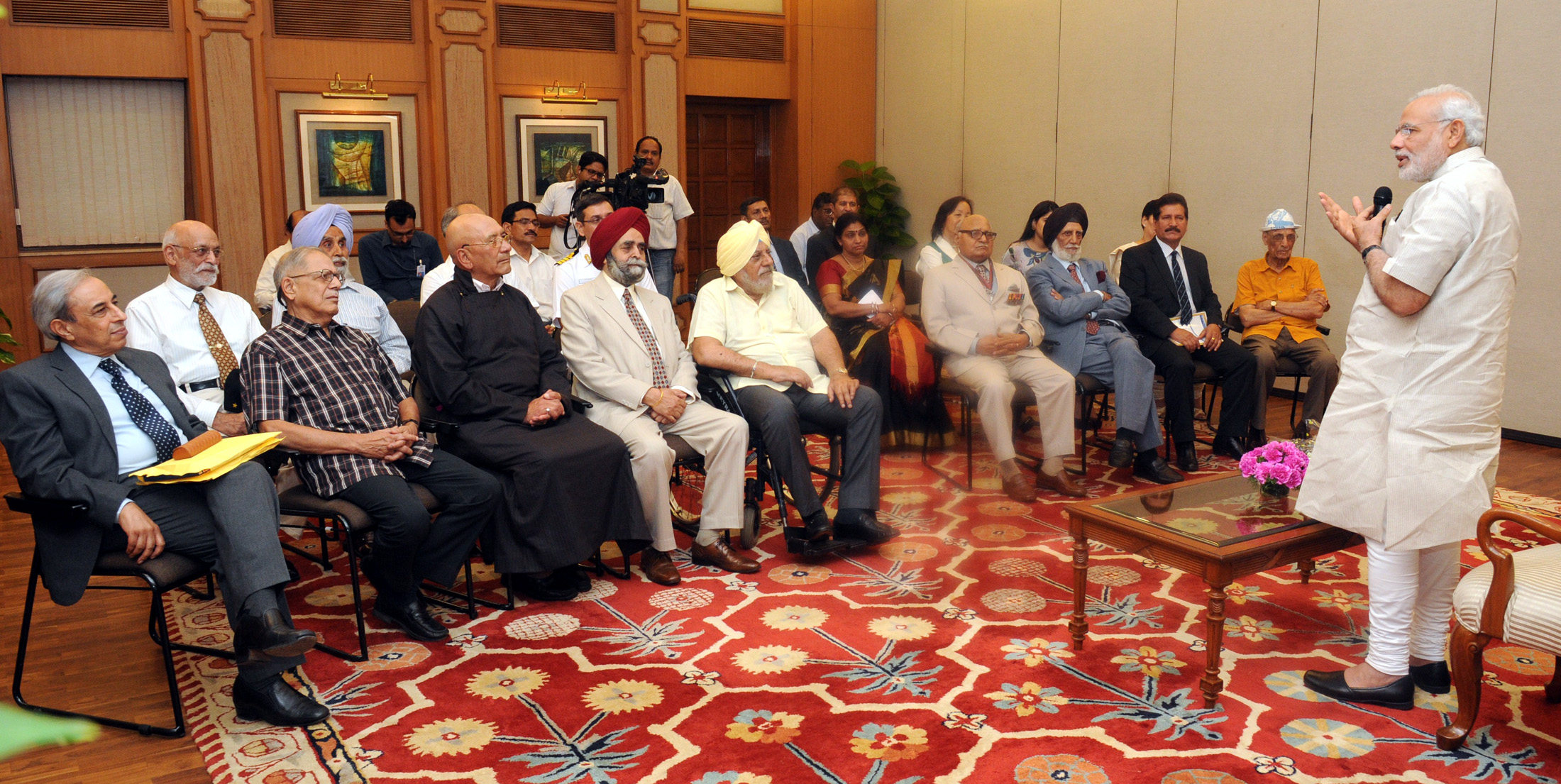
Prime Minister, Shri Narendra Modi meets the members of Indian Everest Expedition 1965 on the occasion of the expedition's Golden Jubilee on May 20, 2015

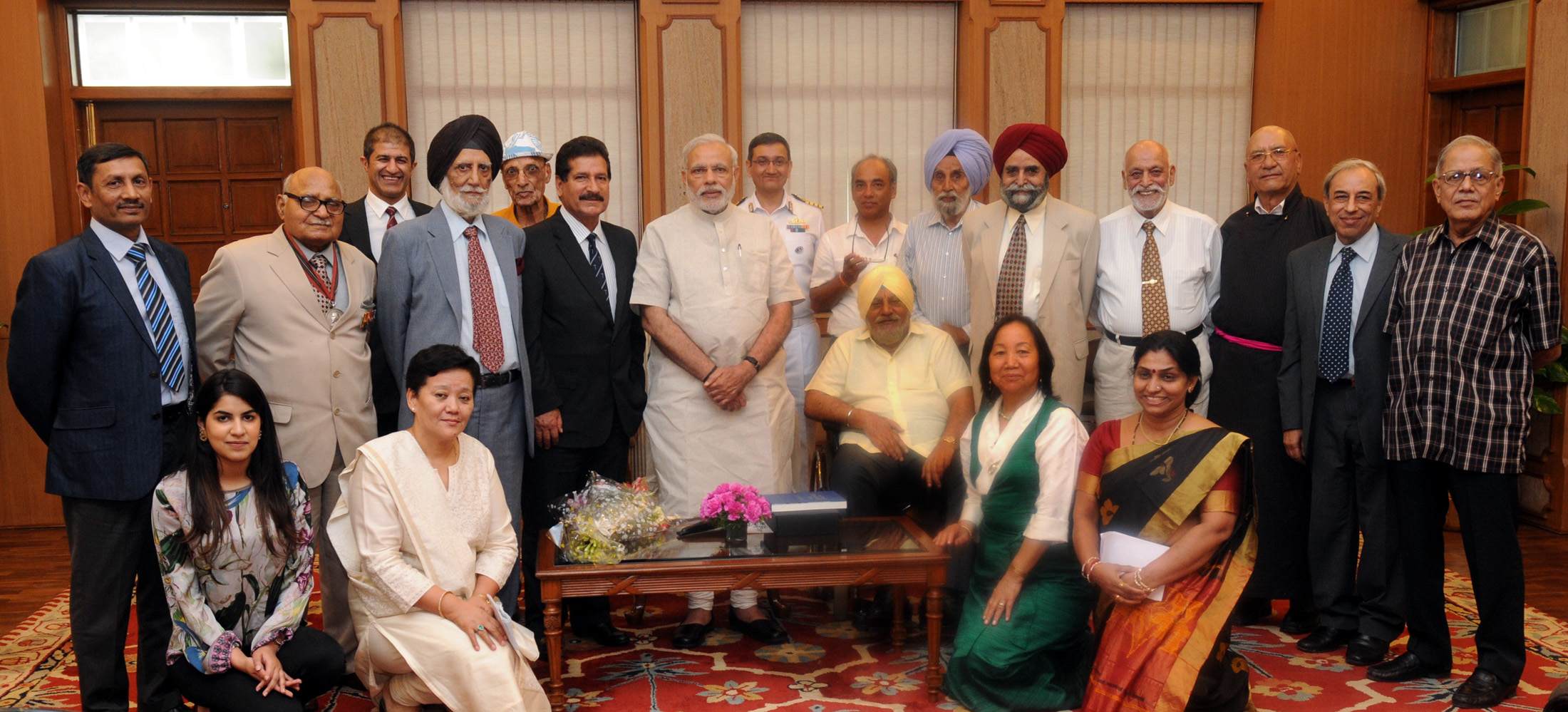
Prime Minister, Shri Narendra Modi meets the members of Indian Everest Expedition 1965 on the occasion of the expedition's Golden Jubilee on May 20, 2015

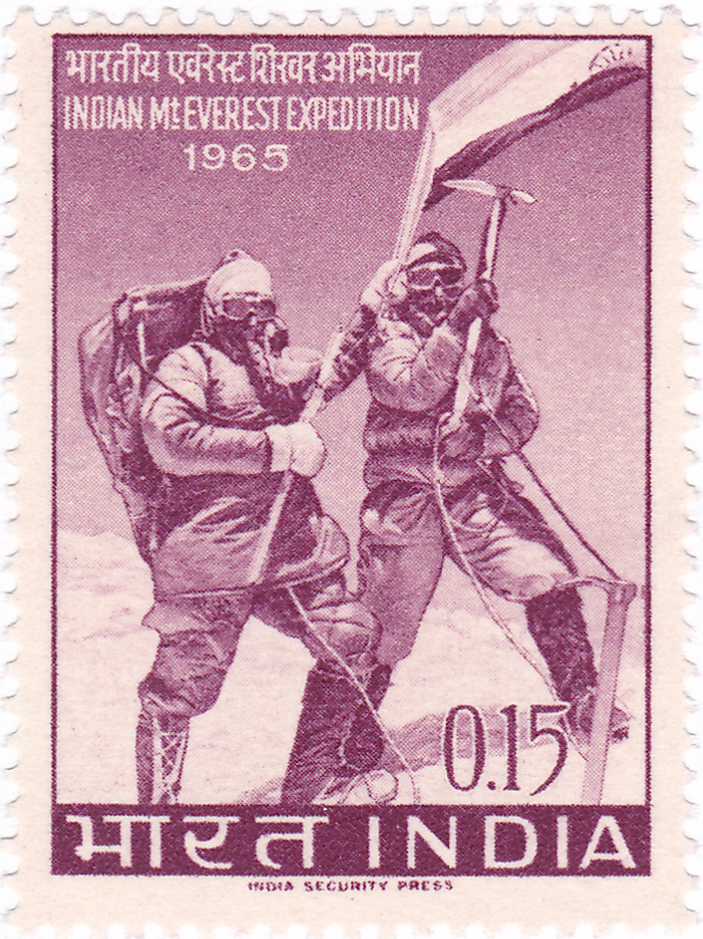
1965 Indian stamp dedicated to the 1965 Everest Expedition

Harish Chandra Singh Rawat (3 July 1934 – 20 January 2008) was a mountaineer who climbed Mt. Everest in May 1965. He was one of the 9 summiters during the first successful Indian Everest Expedition, the expedition was led by Captain M S Kohli. On 24 May 1965 Vohra and Ang Kami Sherpa had reached the top of Mount Everest together. A few days later, on 29 May and 12 years to the day from the first ascent of Mount Everest, the fourth and last summit team with Major H. P. S. Ahluwalia, Phu Dorjee Sherpa, and Rawat reached the summit. This was the first time three climbers had stood on the summit together, Rawat was the 7th Indian man and 22nd man in world to climb Mount Everest.

== Biography ==
Rawat had graduated from Lucknow University in 1952 and joined central government service in the same year, in the Intelligence Bureau. He was posted as Deputy Central Intelligence Officer, Gorakhpur, in October 1963. Thereafter he shifted to Special Service Bureau (now Sashastra Seema Bal). He was Joint Assistant Director in SSB headquarters in 1965. In January 1970, he became the founder chief of the High Altitude Operations Training Centre, at Sandev, near Didihat. In October 1972, it was merged with SSB's Frontier Academy at Gwaldam as its Mountaineering Wing, and Rawat became that wing's first Senior Instructor.

Rawat died of lung cancer in New Delhi, aged 74.

== Mountaineering ==
Rawat participated in a number of expeditions including Nanda Devi, Sunanda Devi, Kanglacha, Hathi Parbat, Tirsuli, Rathong, Nanda Khat and Nun Kun. In 1962, he led a party, including Sonam Wangyal, another Everester of the 1965 expedition, to Kanglacha, 30 miles south of Leh. In 1963, Rawat climbed Hathi Parbat and a year later he was part of the Tirsuli and Sunanda Devi expedition. In the pre-Everest preparations, he climbed Rathong.

Kohli, who had led the 1965 Everest expedition, recruited Rawat to join a team on a secretive mission to Nanda Devi. The joint CIA / Indian Intelligence Bureau mission involved placing a nuclear powered listening device on the mountain in 1965 with several subsequent visits to Nanda Devi and Nanda Kot 1966 and 1967. At that time (1965), he was and later worked for social welfare in Uttarakhand.

== Honors and awards ==
He was awarded Arjuna award and Padma Shri for his achievements.

He was vice president of the Indian Mountaineering Foundation.

== See also ==
- Indian summiters of Mount Everest - Year wise
- List of Mount Everest summiters by number of times to the summit
- List of Mount Everest records of India
- List of Mount Everest records
