= Phu Dorjee Sherpa =

Nepalese summiter of Mount Everest

- Born: 1928; Khumjung, Nepal
- Died: 18 October 1969 (aged 40–41); Khumbu Icefall, Everest
- Military career
- Allegiance: India
- Awards: Padma Shri

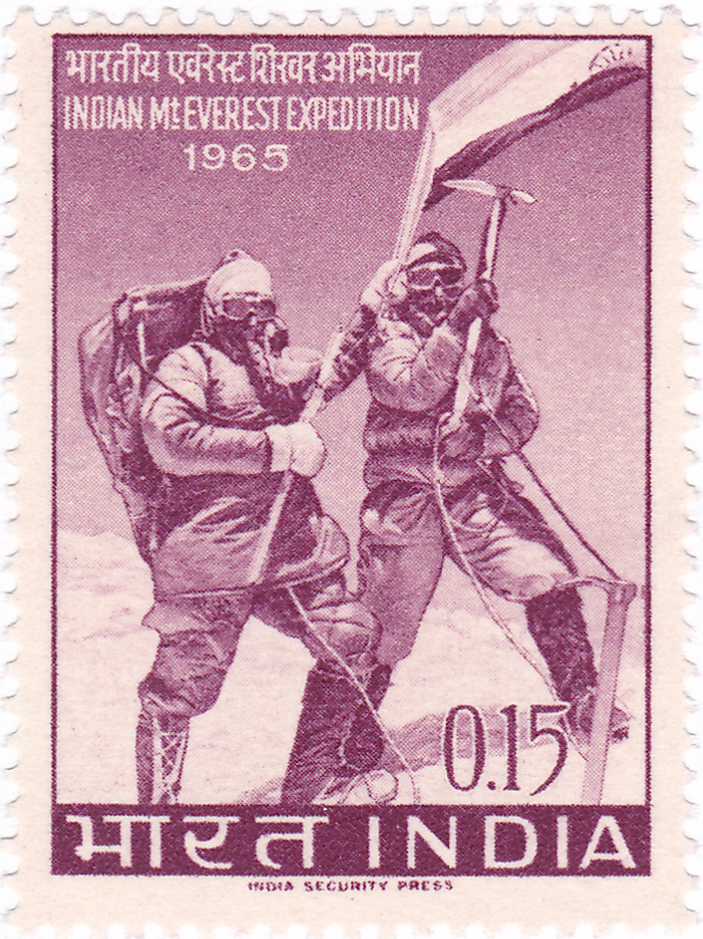
1965 Indian stamp dedicated to the 1965 Everest Expedition

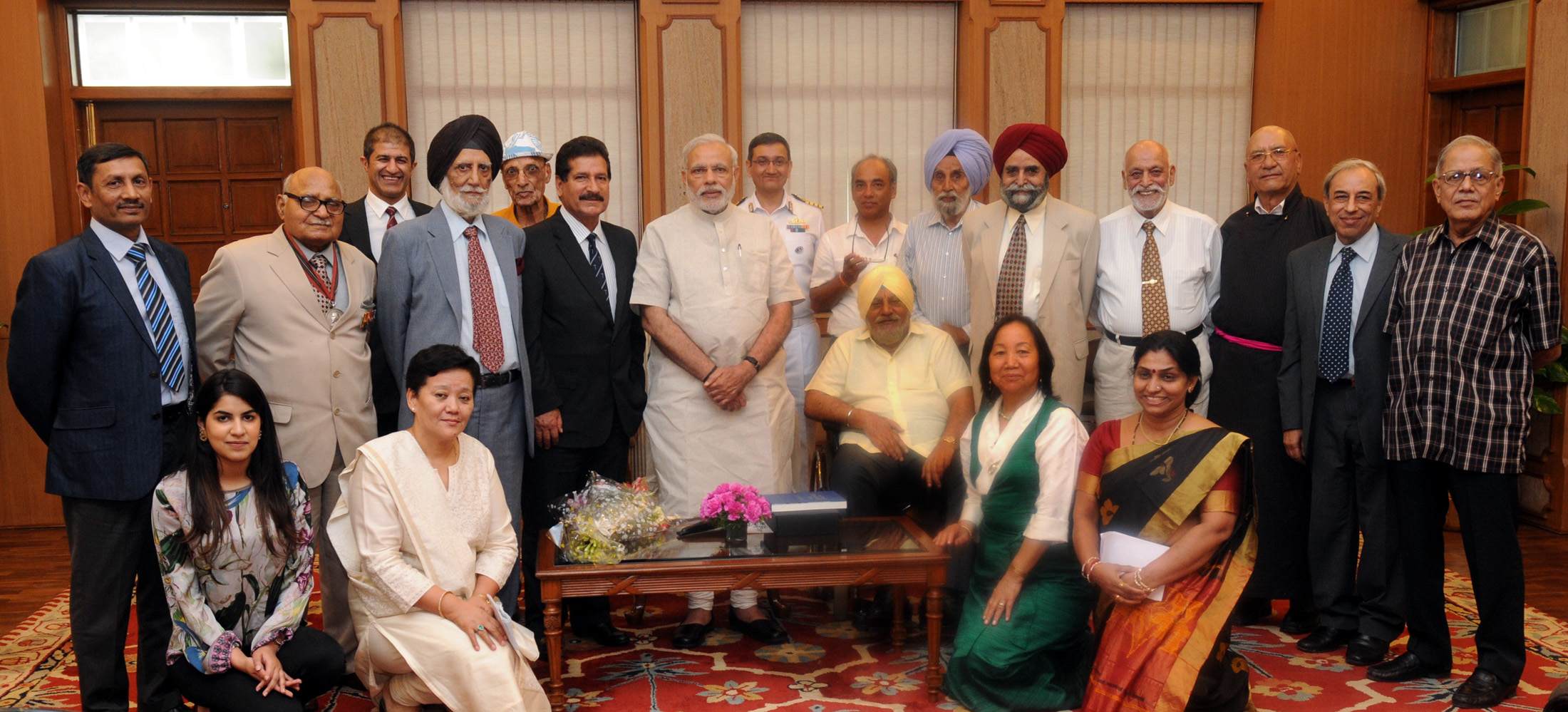
Prime Minister Shri Narendra Modi meets the living members of the 1965 Indian Everest Expedition on the Golden Jubilee of the occasion on 20 May 2015. Note: Phu Dorjee Sherpa is not pictured.

Phu Dorjee Sherpa (1928-1969) (sometimes written as Phu Dorji) was the 23rd person in the world to climb Mount Everest.

== Mountaineering ==
He was a member of the third Indian Everest Expedition 1965, led by Captain M S Kohli, the first successful Indian Everest Expedition. The group consisted of 21 major expedition members and 50 Sherpas. The initial attempt was at the end of April, when they returned to base camp due to bad weather and waited 2 weeks for better weather.

On 29 May 1965, on the fourth and final attempt on the 12th anniversary of the first conquest of Mount Everest, together with H. P. S. Ahluwalia and Harish Chandra Singh Rawat, Phu Dorjee summited Mount Everest. This was the first time that these three climbers climbed the mountain together.

He was a porter on the approach march to the base camp for the 1953 British Mount Everest expedition and one of a small group that "showed promise" during the approach and were retained to carry loads to higher camps. He was part of the "high level team" with Wilfrid Noyce which carried loads as far as the south col. He was also recruited as a porter for the approach to Lhotse with "The International Himalaya Expedition 1955" which was led by Norman Dyhrenfurth. He was again retained to the end of the expedition and carried loads to the Camp V at 25,000 ft.

In 1963 he was part of the American Mount Everest expedition and he carried loads to the South Col.

Kohli, who had led the 1965 Everest expedition, recruited Phu Dorjee to join a team on a secretive mission to Nanda Devi. The joint CIA / Indian Intelligence Bureau mission involved placing a nuclear powered listening device on the mountain in 1965 with several subsequent visits to Nanda Devi and Nanda Kot 1966 and 1967. Phu Dorjee had previously worked with several American members of the team whilst on the 1963 American Mount Everest expedition.

== Biography ==
Phu Dorjee Sherpa was born in 1928 in Khumjung, Nepal. He died in a fall on Mount Everest on 18 October 1969 whilst working with a Japanese expedition.

== Awards ==
- Himalayan Club Tiger Badge 1964 for his part in the 1963 American Mount Everest expedition.
- Received the Padma Shri for being one of the first Indians to summit Mount Everest in 1965

== See also ==
- List of Mount Everest summiters by number of times to the summit
- List of Mount Everest records of India
- List of Mount Everest records

== See also ==
- List of Mount Everest summiters by number of times to the summit
- List of 20th-century summiters of Mount Everest
- List of Mount Everest records of India
