= Ang Kami Sherpa =

Indian mountaineer

- Born: India
- Died: 1970
- Military career
- Allegiance: India; Nepal
- Awards: Padma Shri; Arjuna Award

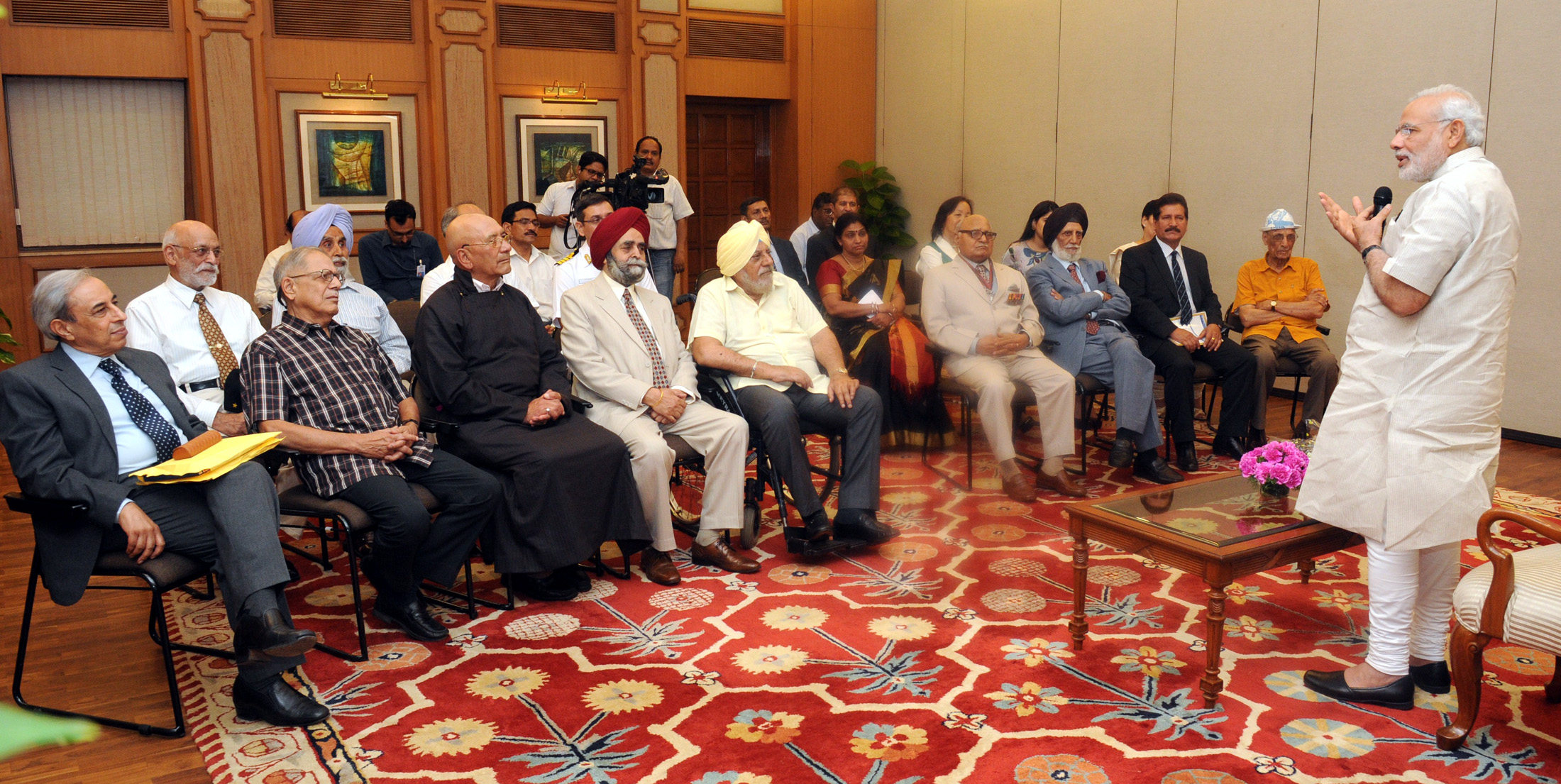
Prime Minister, Shri Narendra Modi meets the members of Indian Everest Expedition 1965 on the occasion of Golden Jubilee of this on 20 May 2015

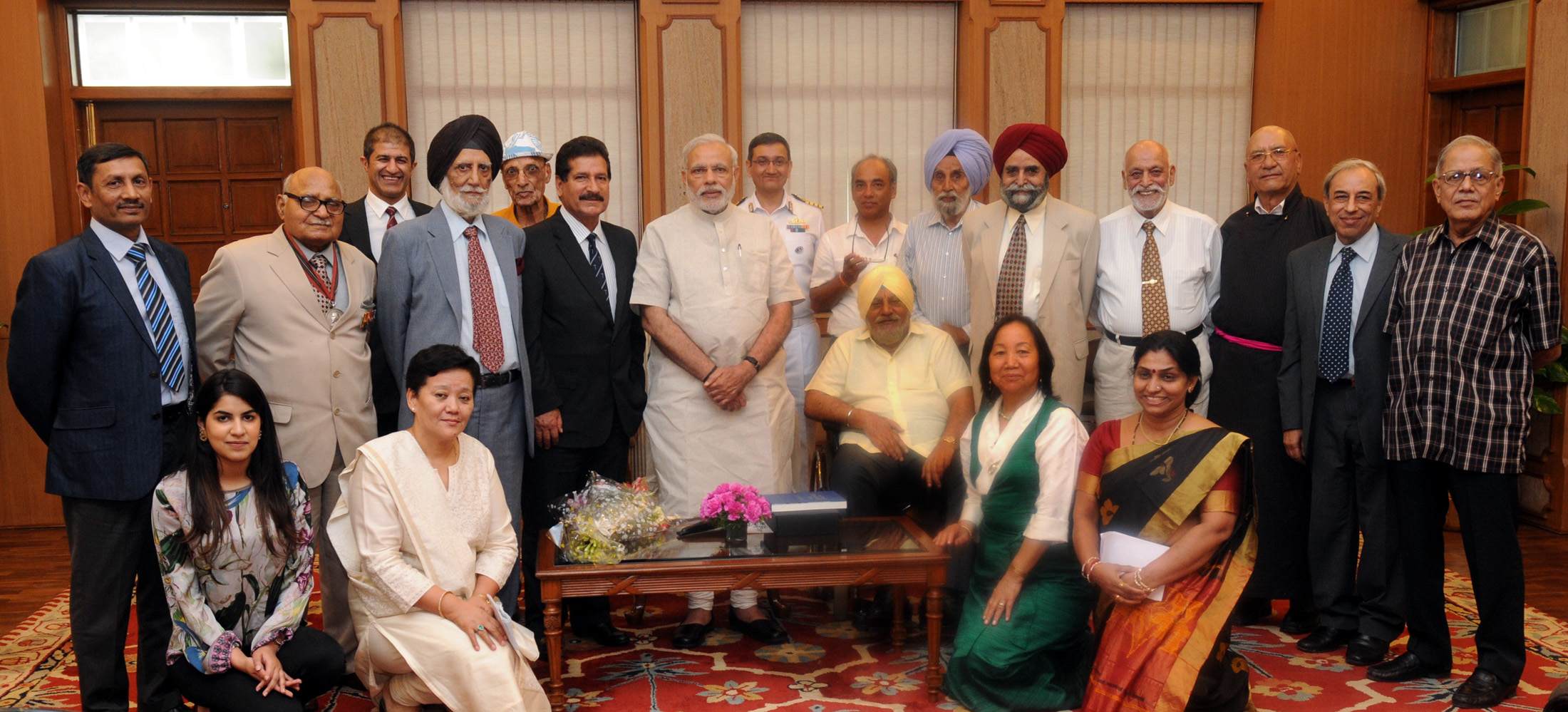
Prime Minister, Shri Narendra Modi meets the members of Indian Everest Expedition 1965 on the occasion of Golden Jubilee of this on 20 May 2015

Ang Kami Sherpa was the member of the third Indian Everest expedition, led by Captain M S Kohliin 1965 which was first Nepali Indian successful Everest Expedition climbed Mount Everest, consisted of 21 major expedition members and 50 Sherpas. The initial attempt was at the end of April 1965, when they returned to base camp due to bad weather and waited 2 weeks for better weather. Together with C. P. Vohra Ang Kami reached on the summit on 24 May 1965. He is the 5th Indian and 20th person in the world to have climbed Mount Everest.

== Honors and awards ==
He was awarded Arjuna award and Padma Shri for his achievements. He was also awarded the gold medal by the Indian Mountaineering Foundation.

== See also ==
- Indian summiters of Mount Everest - Year wise
- List of Mount Everest records of India
- List of Mount Everest records
- List of Mount Everest summiters by number of times to the summit
