= Chandra Prakash Vohra =

Indian geologist and mountaineer

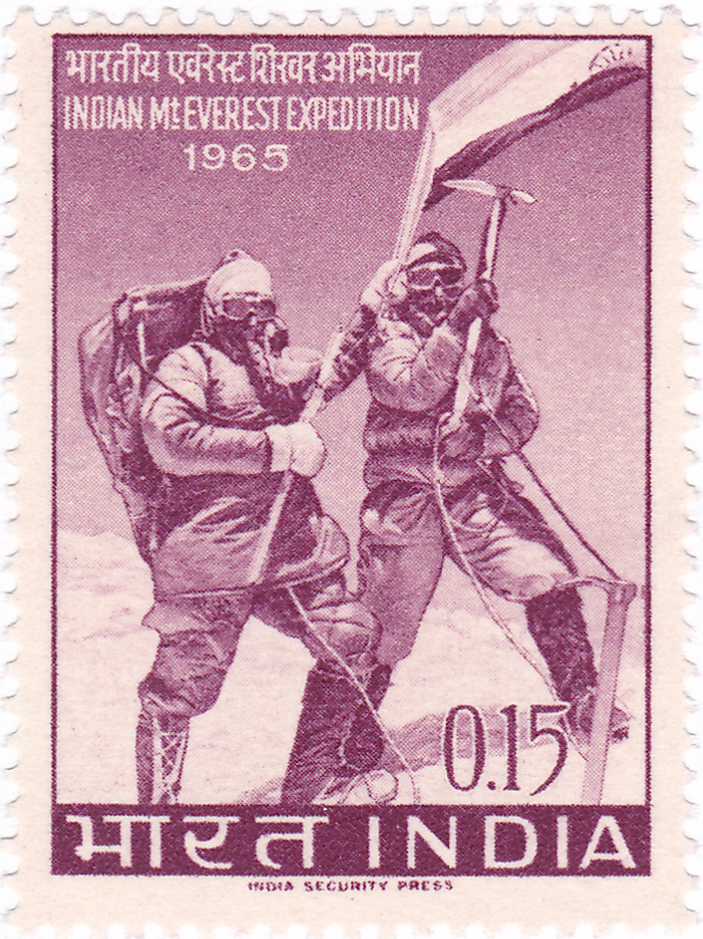
- 1965 Indian stamp dedicated to the 1965 Everest Expedition
- Born: India
- Died: 21 February 2026; India
- Occupations: geologist, glaciologist and mountaineer
- Known for: mountaineering
- Spouse: Satinder Vohra
- Awards: Padma Shri; Arjuna Award; National Mineral Award; Nain Singh – Kishen Singh Lifetime Achievement Award

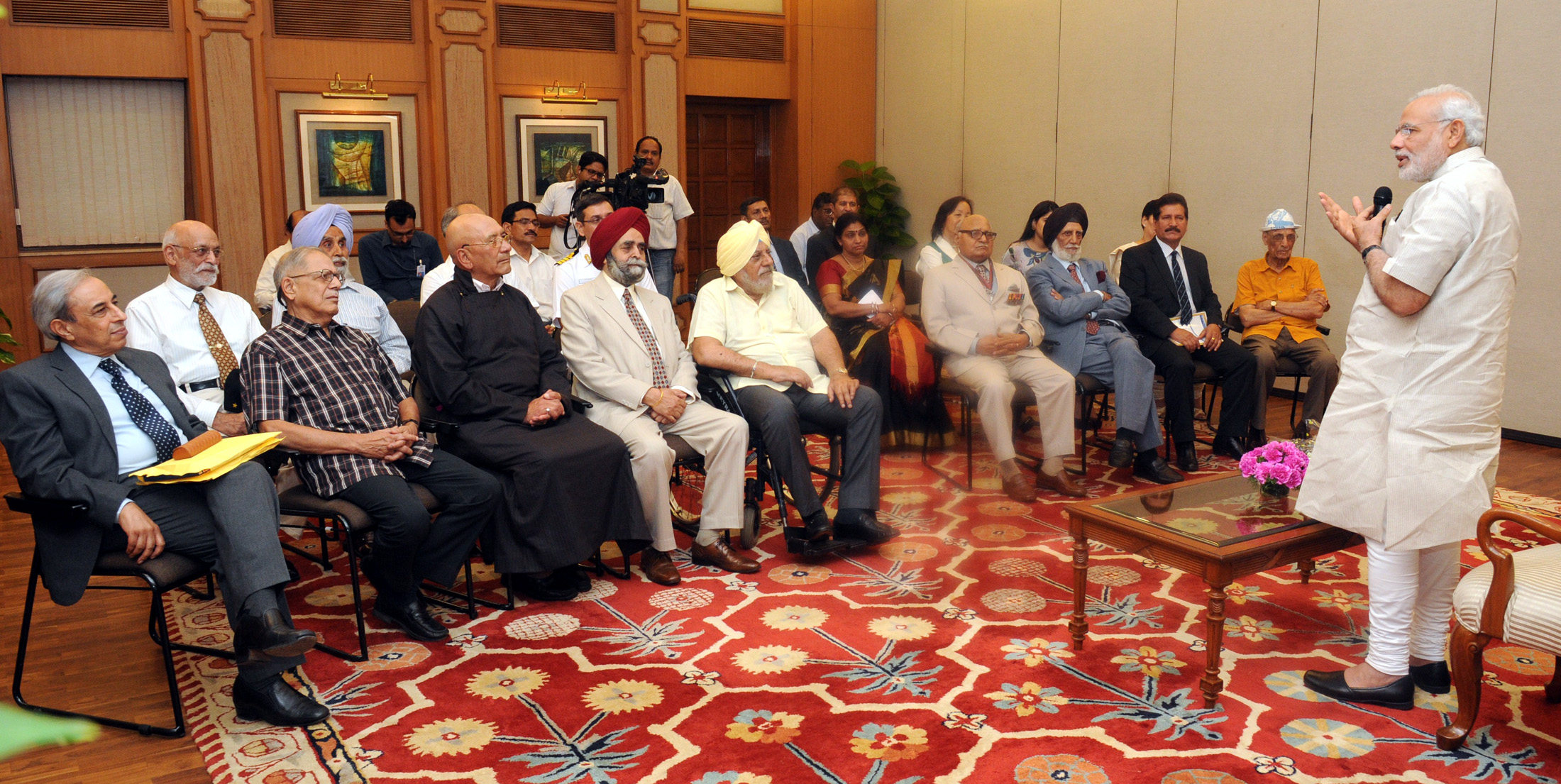
Prime Minister, Shri Narendra Modi meets the members of Indian Everest Expedition 1965 on the occasion of Golden Jubilee of this on 20 May 2015

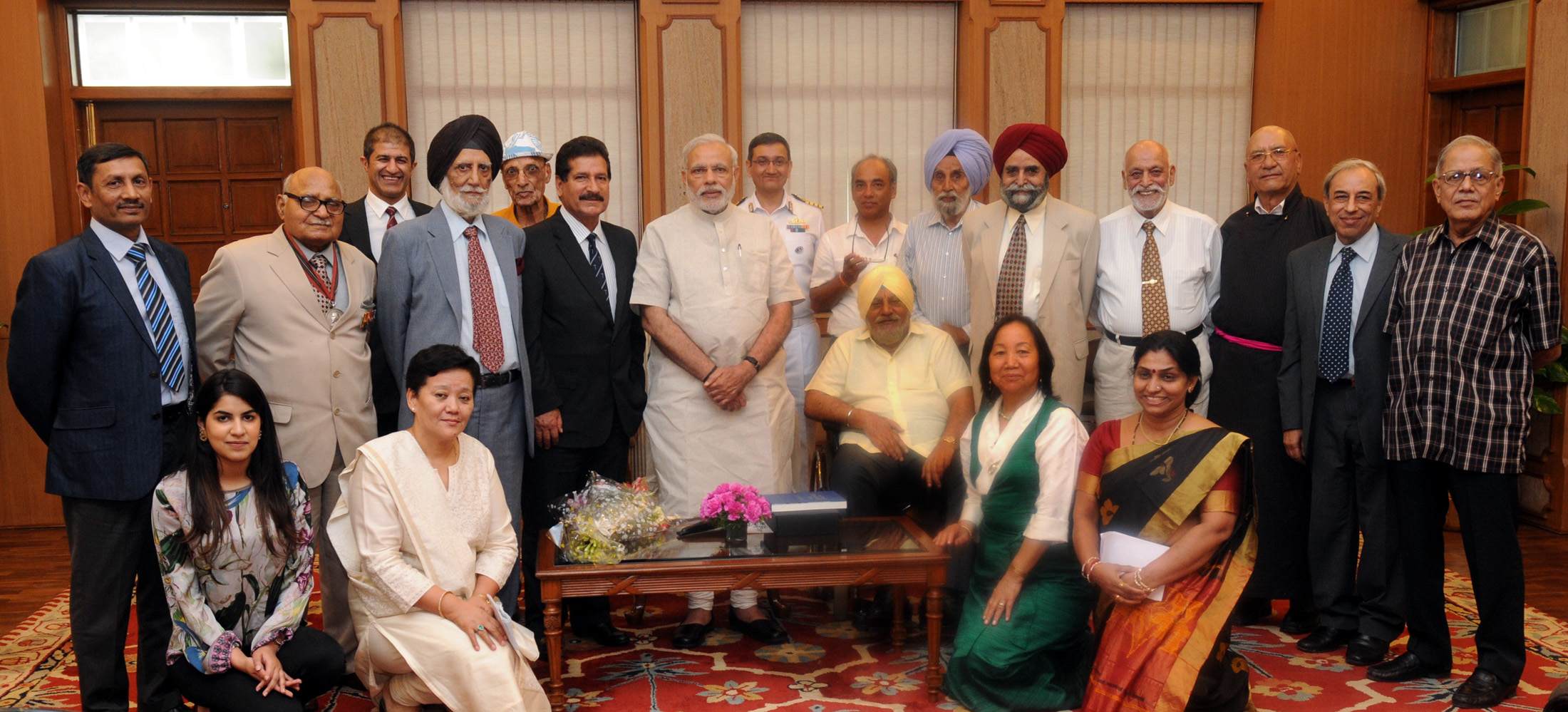
Prime Minister, Shri Narendra Modi meets the members of Indian Everest Expedition 1965 on the occasion of Golden Jubilee of this on 20 May 2015

Chandra Prakash Vohra was an Indian geologist, glaciologist and a mountaineer who climbed Mount Everest, the highest peak in the world, in 1965. He was one of the 9 summiters of the first successful Indian Everest Expedition that climbed Mount Everest in May 1965 led by Captain M S Kohli. On 24 May 1965 Vohra and Ang Kami Sherpa together reached the top of Mount Everest He was the first Indian civilian to scale the peak a feat he accomplished on 24 May 1965. A winner of the Arjuna Award (1965), and the National Mineral Award, Vohra was honoured by the Government of India in 1965, with the award of Padma Shri, the fourth highest Indian civilian award. He was the 4th Indian man and 19th man in the world to climb Mount Everest.

== Biography ==
Chandra Prakash Singh Vohra did his schooling in Jammu and Kashmir and started his career with the Geological Survey of India (GSI). He spent his entire career with GSI becoming the first director of the Division for Snow, Ice and Glacier Studies and retired in 1994 as its director general. A geologist by profession, he carried out several geological expeditions and is known to have visited many glaciers around the world. He participated in three Everest expeditions and summitted the peak in 1965, becoming the first Indian civilian to achieve the feat. In 1973, he was part of a team that explored Antarctica and was successful in camping at the southern tip of the continent. He was the leader of the landing group of the First Indian Expedition to Antarctica in 1981.

== Honors and awards ==
Vohra was a recipient of the National Mineral Award of the Ministry of Mines (India). The Government of India awarded him the civilian honour of Padma Shri in 1965 and he received the Arjuna Award, the second highest Indian sports award from the Sports Authority of India the same year. In 1996, in the golden jubilee year of Indian independence, Vohra was officially included in the list of the most outstanding geoscientists of Independent India. The Indian Mountaineering Foundation awarded him their Nain Singh-Kishen Singh Lifetime Achievement Award in 2010.

Chandra Prakash Vohra, post retirement from government service, settled in Chandigarh, with his wife Satinder Vohra.

== See also ==
- Mountaineering in India
- Indian summiters of Mount Everest - Year wise
- List of Mount Everest summiters by number of times to the summit
- List of Mount Everest records of India
- List of Mount Everest records
- Geological Survey of India
