= List of Indian summiteers of Mount Everest =

The first attempt to summit Mount Everest by Indians occurred in 1960, led by Brig. Gyan Singh. The first Indians to reach the summit were a group led by Captain M.S. Kohli in the 1965 Indian Everest Expedition. A total of 422 Indians have made 465 attempts to summit from 1965 to 2018, including 43 repeat attempts by 29 climbers. There have been 81 attempts by 74 Indian women, including seven repeat attempts by four female climbers.

== Notable ascents ==
Date/year	Name	Notation	Details	Ref.
20 May 1965	Avtar S. Cheema	The first Indian to summit Mount Everest.	Capt. Avtar S. Cheema and Nawang Gombu Sherpa climbed Mount Everest; Cheema was the first Indian to achieve this feat.	
23 May 1984	Bachendri Pal	The first Indian woman to summit Mount Everest.		
10 May 1993	Santosh Yadav	The first woman in the world to summit Mount Everest twice.	Her first summit in 1992 was part of the Indo-Tibetan Border Police Expedition. Her second summit was the Indo-Nepalese Women's expedition in 1993.	
19 May 2013	Tashi and Nungshi Malik	The first twins to scale Mount Everest.		
21 May 2013	Arunima Sinha	The first female amputee to scale Mount Everest.		
25 May 2014	Malavath Purna	The youngest girl to summit Mount Everest.	Purna summited the mountain at the age of 13 years and 11 months.	
16 - 21 May 2017	Anshu Jamsenpa	The first woman in the world to summit twice in a season, and the fastest double summiter to do so within five days.		
16 May 2018	Ajeet Bajaj and Dia Susanna Bajaj	The first Indian father and daughter to summit Everest together.		
20 May 2018	Love Raj Singh Dharmshaktu	The first Indian to climb Everest seven times.		
2018	Sangeeta Sindhi Bahl	The oldest Indian woman to climb Everest.	She climbed the summit at the age of 53.	
23 May 2019	Ravindra Kumar	The first Indian Administrative Service officer to climb Everest.	Kumar scaled Everest twice.	
21-22 May 2024	Reena Bhatti	The fastest Indian woman to summit.	In May 2024, Bhatti summited Mount Everest and Mount Lhotse within 20.5 hours. She is reportedly the fastest Indian woman to climb both peaks consecutively.	
18 May 2025	Safrina Latheef	The first woman from Kerala to summit.	Summited Kilimanjaro, Aconcagua, Elbrus and Everest Base Camp Previously.	

== 1960s ==
=== 1960 ===
The first Indian expedition to scale Everest by an Indian Army team (led by Brigadier Gyan Singh) was unsuccessful. Climbers Colonel Narendra Kumar, Sonam Gyatso, and Sherpa Nawang Gombu reached 28,300 feet (8,600 meters) but turned back due to bad weather.

=== 1962 ===
The second Indian expedition to attempt to scale Everest by an Indian Army team (led by Major John Dias) was also unsuccessful. Climbers Captain M.S. Kohli, Sonam Gyatso, and Hari Dang reached 28,600 feet (8,700 meters) but turned back due to bad weather.

=== 1965 ===
The third Indian expedition by the Indian Army was led by M.S. Kohli and included 21 core members and 50 Sherpas. The initial attempt was in late April and, due to bad weather, they went back to base camp and waited two weeks for better weather. By the end of May, they had succeeded by scaling the mountain in four successive attempts. Colonel Narendra "Bull" Kumar was the deputy leader of the team. The expedition made India the fourth country to scale Mount Everest.

- On 20 May 1965, Avtar S. Cheema became the first Indian to summit Mount Everest, along with Nawang Gombu Sherpa. This was the second time Nawang Gombu Sherpa climbed Mount Everest, the first being with the American Expedition in 1963. Tenzing Norgay, the first man to climb Mount Everest (with Edmund Hillary), was his uncle.
- Two days later, on 22 May, Sonam Gyatso and Sonam Wangyal reached the summit and became the first siblings to climb Mount Everest together.
- On 24 May, C. P. Vohra (a civilian and a geologist from the Geological Survey of India) and Ang Kami Sherpa reached the summit.
- On 29 May, Major H. P. S. Ahluwalia, H. C. S. Rawat, and Phu Dorjee Sherpa made the fourth and last summit. This was the first time three climbers stood on the summit together.

Records of the expedition

- First Indian team to successfully climb Mount Everest
- First Indian leader to successfully lead an Everest expedition (M. S. Kohli)
- First time three climbers stood on the summit together
- First time nine climbers reached the summit, setting a world record, which India held for 17 years
- First man in the world to climb Everest twice (Nawang Gombu Sherpa)
- First time that siblings climbed Everest together

== 1970s ==
There were no Indian ascents for seventeen years, between 1966 and 1983.

== 1980s ==
=== 1984 ===
In 1984, the fourth Indian expedition was led by Darshan Kumar Khullar and recorded a total of five ascents, including that of Bachendri Pal, the first Indian woman summiteer, all ascending from the south side (Nepal). Lieutenant Colonel Prem Chand was the deputy leader.

South Col side summiteers

- Phu Dorjee Sherpa - the first Indian to summit without oxygen
- Bachendri Pal
- Dorjee Lhatoo Sherpa
- Sonam Palzor Sherpa
- Ang Dorje Sherpa

== 1990s ==
=== 1992 ===
The 1992 expedition to Mount Everest by Indo-Tibetan Border Police was led by Major Hukam Singh and recorded a total of eight ascents by Indians, including Santosh Yadav. Senior medical officer Chittaranjan R. Pattanayak was the deputy leader.

South Col side summiteers

- Sunil Dutta Sharma
- Prem Singh
- Kanhaya Lal Pokhriyal
- Mohan Singh Gunjyal
- Santosh Yadav
- Lobsang (Deepak) Sherpa Tsering
- Sange Muktuk Sherpa
- Wangchuk Sherpa

=== 1993 ===
The 1993 Indo-Nepalese Everest expedition was the first all-woman expedition by the Indian Mountaineering Foundation and was also funded by the Ministry of Youth Affairs and Sports. The 21-member team was led by Bachendri Pal. The expedition set several world records, including the largest number of persons (eighteen) on a single expedition to climb Mount Everest, and largest number of women (seven) from a single country to climb Mount Everest.

Santosh Yadav became the first woman in the world to climb Mount Everest twice while Dicky Dolma became the youngest woman (19 years old) in the world to climb Everest. Santosh Yadav and Rita Gombu Marwah were the deputy leaders. Eighteen ascents took place, with eleven of them by Indians and seven by women.

South Col side summiteers

- Santosh Yadav
- Dicky Dolma
- Kunga Bhutia
- Dal Dev (Baldev) Kunwar
- Nima Norbu Dolma
- Suman Kutiyal
- Savita Martolia
- Deepu Sharma
- Rajiv Sharma
- Radha Devi Thakur
- Kusang Dorje Sherpa
- Lopsang Jangbu Sherpa
- Dorje Sherpa
- Ngatemba Sherpa
- Ngatemba Sherpa
- Nima Dorje I Sherpa
- Ongada Chiring Sherpa
- Tenzing Sherpa
- Lobsang Tshering Bhotia, the nephew of Tenzing Norgay, was a member of the 1993 Australian–Macedonian Everest Expedition led by Tashi Wangchuk Tenzing. He reached the summit, but died from a fall during the descent.

=== 1996 ===
The second 1996 Indo-Tibetan Border Police expedition to Mount Everest by the Indo-Tibetan Border Police was led by Mohinder Singh and coincided with the 1996 Mount Everest disaster, in which three summiteers on the expedition died on the mountain. The expedition is credited as being the first Indian ascent of Everest from the North Side, and a total of eight persons reached the summit. Indo-Tibetan Border Police personnel Parash Mani Das and Harbhajan Singh were the deputy leaders.

North Col side summiteers

- Tsewang Paljor
- Dorje Morup
- Tsewang Samanla
- Tashi Ram Negi
- Hira Ram Singh
- Kusang Dorjee Sherpa
- Nadre Sherpa
- Sange Muktuk Sherpa

=== 1998 ===
In 1998, an expedition to Mount Everest was led by Hrishikesh Yadav as part of the Indian Independence Golden Jubilee celebration. During this expedition, a total of eight persons reached the summit, two being Indians and six being sherpas. This was the first successful Indian civilian expedition over any 8000 meter peak. Abhijit Burman was the youngest climber on the expedition, being only 30.

North Col side summiteers

- Surendra Chavan
- Love Raj Singh Dharmshaktu
- Dawa Tashi Sherpa
- Dawa Norbu II Sherpa
- Tamtin Sherpa
- Nawang Tenzing Sherpa I
- Phinzo Norbu Sherpa
- Niam Gyalzen Sherpa

Another Indian, Kusang Dorjee Sherpa, reached the top as a hired member of the Himalayan Kingdom expedition led by David Walsh.

=== 1999 ===
The 1999 Indian Everest Millennium Expedition was led by Santosh Yadav. During this expedition, a total of four ascents were by Indians.

South Col side summiteers

- Amar Prakash Dogra
- Kusang Dorjee Sherpa
- Sange Muktuk Sherpa
- Dinesh Kumar

== 2000s ==
=== 2001 ===
The 2001 Indian Army Mount Everest Expedition was led by Colonel Krishan Kumar. During this expedition, fifteen people reached the summit, seven of them being Indians and eight being sherpas. Satish Chander Sharma was the deputy leader.

South Col side summiteers

- Chanchal Singh Dhasila
- Neel Chand Dogra
- Mohinder Singh Negi
- Palden Giachho Negi
- Amar Prakash Dogra
- Saurabh Singh Shekhawat
- Chhering Norbu Bodh
- Til Bikram Budhathoki
- Dendi Sherpa
- Lhakpa Nuru Sherpa
- Mingma Tshering Sherpa
- Nga Temba Sherpa
- Pasang Gelu Sherpa
- Pasang Rinji Sherpa
- Pasang Tendi Sherpa

=== 2003 ===
The 2003 Indo-Nepal Army on Everest and Lhotse Expedition, led by Colonel Ashok Abbey, recorded a total of sixteen persons reaching the summit, nine of them being Indians and seven being sherpas. Major Chandra Shekhar Manda was the deputy leader.

South Col side summiteers

1. Angchuk Chhering
2. Tashi Gyapo
3. Rajendra Singh Jalal
4. Jagat Singh Negi
5. Lalit Kumar Negi
6. Kunwar Singh Rawat
7. Saurabh Singh Shekhawat
8. Abhijeet Singh
9. Lal Singh Thapa
10. Damai Chhiri Sherpa
11. Dendi Sherpa
12. Pasang Sherpa
13. Pasang Rinji Sherpa
14. Pasang Rita Sherpa
15. Pemba Rinzi/Rinji Sherpa
16. Pemba Tshering (Pemba Chhiri) Sherpa

The 2003 Himalayan Mountaineering Institute Everest Expedition led by the principal of Himalayan Mountaineering Institute Colonel, Vijay Singh Thakur recorded a total of two ascents by Indians. Kulwant Singh Dhami was the deputy leader.

North Col side summiteers

- Kusang Dorjee Sherpa
- Nadre Sherpa

=== 2004 ===
The first 2004 Indian Navy Mount Everest North Face Expedition by Indian Navy led by Satyabrata Dam recorded a total of 12 persons reaching the summit, five of them being Indians and seven being sherpas. Lieutenant Amit Pande was the deputy leader.

North Col side summiteers

- Satyabrata Dam
- Dr. Viking Bhanoo
- Abhishek Kankan
- Rakesh Kumar Lagwal
- Vikas Kumar Mehra

=== 2005 ===
The 2005 Indian Army Women Everest Expedition, led by Major Saurabh Singh Shekhawat, recorded a total of fifteen persons reaching the summit, nine of them being Indians and six being sherpas. The deputy leader was lieutenant colonel Anand Swaroop.

North Col side summiteers

- Saurabh Singh Shekhawat
- Topgay Bhutia
- Tsering Ladol
- Dachen Lhamo
- Sipra Majumdar
- Jagat Singh Negi
- Ashwini Ajitshing Sadekar Pawar
- Kaman Singh
- Surjeet Singh

The 2005 Indian Air Force Everest Expedition by Indian Air Force led by Air Force wing commander Amit Chowdhury recorded a total of seven persons reaching the summit, three of them being Indians and four being sherpas.

North Col side summiteers

- Sirigereshiva Shankarappa Chaitanya
- Niku Ram Chowdhary
- Ramesh Chandra Tripathi

=== 2006 ===
The First Border Security Force (BSF) Everest Expedition 2006, led by Major Sharab Chandub Negi, recorded a total of sixteen persons reaching the summit, seven of them being Indians and nine being sherpas.

South Col side summiteers

- Sharab Chandub Negi
- Loveraj Singh Dharmshaktu
- Kamlash Kumar Bounthiyal
- Manoj Dahal
- Kedar Singh Koranga
- Parveen Singh Lohia
- Bhagat Singh Rawat
- Mastan Babu Malli (expedition led by Arnold Coster)

The third 2006 Indo-Tibetan Border Police expedition to Mount Everest, led by Harbhajan Singh, recorded a total of fourteen persons reaching the summit, twelve of them being Indians and two being sherpas. Prem Singh was the deputy leader.

North Col side summiteers

- Prem Singh
- Nawang Dorjey
- Mohammad Ali Khan
- Sri Kishan
- Pradeep Kumar
- Vishal Mani Maithani
- Hira Ram Singh
- Pasang Tenzing Sherpa
- Wangchuk Sherpa
- Jot (Jyoti) Singh Bhandari
- Ongda Gyalzen Sherpa
- Sangay Furi Sherpa

=== 2007 ===
The 2007 Indian Army Everest Expedition led by Lt. Colonel Ishwar Singh Thapa recorded a total of 24 persons reaching the summit, twelve of them being Indians and twelve being sherpas.

North Col side summiteers

- Tsering Angchok
- Amar Dev Bhatt
- Maruti Khandagle
- Sachin Raosaheb Patil
- Dharmjot Singh
- Balwant Singh Negi
- Khem Chand Thakur
- Narendra Singh Chandel
- Dayanand Dhali
- Nandkumar Jagtap
- Ram Bahadur Mall
- Tejpal Singh Negi

Shekhar Babu Bachinepally reached the summit in a separate two-men expedition.

South Col side summiteers

Ongda Gyalzen Sherpa reached the summit as a Sherpa in the Caudweel Xtreem Everest led by Michael Patrick William (Mike) Grocott.

=== 2008 ===
The 2008 Indian Army Snow Lion Everest Expedition, led by Army officer Ashok Abbey, recorded a total of eighteen persons reaching the summit, nine of them being Indians and nine being sherpas.

South Col side summiteers

- Sonam Gurmey
- Pasang Tenzin Lektso
- Dechen Lhamo
- Thupten Lobsang
- Jigmey Namgyal
- Tashi Phuntsok
- Tenzin Rigden
- Kumchok Tenpa
- Champa Younten

The 2008 Gyamtsho Tshering Bhutia Everest Expedition recorded a total of 22 persons reaching the summit, ten of them being Indians and twelve being Sherpa.

South Col side summiteers

- Dawa Dhendup Bhutia
- Kunzang Gyatso Bhutia
- Atul Karwal
- Yaduram Sharma
- Nima Wangchuk Sherpa
- Yangdi Sherpa
- Ashish Kumar Singh
- N. Suraj Singh
- Ram Singh
- Phul Maya Tamang

With the help of three sherpas, Kalpana Dash, an Indian lawyer and mountaineer, reached the top. She had attempted to climb Mount Everest twice before, once in 2004 and once in 2006, but failed due to bad weather and health conditions.

=== 2009 ===
The 2009 Nehru Institute of Mountaineering Everest Expedition led by Brig. Mangal Murti Masur, VSM recorded a total of seventeen persons reaching the summit, ten of them being Indians and seven being sherpas.

South Col side summiteers

- Pratap Singh Bisht
- Kavita Burathoki
- Loveraj Singh Dharmshaktu
- Vinod Gusain
- Satal Singh Panwar
- Khushal Singh Rana
- Dashrath Singh Rawat
- Dinesh Singh Rawat
- Vishveshvar Semwal
- Surendra Singh Bodh

On 21 May 2009, Krushnaa Patil climbed the summit and became the youngest woman (at 16 years and 7 months years old) in the world to climb the peak. Gaurav Sharma and Tapi Mra also reached the summit as part of two separate expeditions.

== 2010s ==
=== 2010 ===
2010 recorded a total of four ascents by Indians through separate excursions–all from the South side (Nepal).

On 22 May 2010, Arjun Vajpai became the youngest Indian to reach the summit at the age of 16 years, 11 months, and 18 days.

South Col side summiteers

1. Basanta Kumar Singha Roy
2. Debasish Biswas
3. Arjun Vajpai
4. Mamta Sodha

=== 2011 ===
2011 recorded a total of 20 ascents by nineteen Indians (double ascent Anshu Jamsenpa) from the South side (Nepal).

Premlata Agarwal became the oldest Indian woman to have scaled Mount Everest at the age of 48. Anshu Jamsenpa summited twice on 12 and 21 May.

South Col side summiteers

- Tine Mena (first woman from Arunachal Pradesh)
- Jogabyasa Bhoi
- Ganesh Chandra Jena
- Dipankar Ghosh
- Rajib Bhattacharya
- Sunita Singh Choken
- Premlata Agarwal (became the oldest Indian woman to have scaled Mount Everest)
- Sushma Kaushik
- Vikas Kaushik
- Narinder Singh
- Pawan Grewal

2011 Indian Air Force Women Everest Expedition

The 2011 Indian Air Force Women Everest Expedition led by Lt. Colonel Narender Kumar Dahiya recorded a total of nineteen persons reaching the summit, seven of them being Indians and twelve being sherpas.

South Col side summiteers

- Nivedita Chaudhary
- Devidutta Panda
- Nirupama Pandey
- Ganesh Singh Pokhariya
- Rajika Sharma
- Raju Sindhu
- Jasbir Singh
- In 2013, Wansuk Myrthong became the first woman from the state of Meghalaya to climb the summit on 18 May 2013.

=== 2012 ===
2012 recorded a total of 52 ascents by Indians, ten of them by women with seven from the north side (China/Tibet) and 45 from the south side (Nepal).

=== 2012 Indo-Tibetan Border Police expedition to Mount Everest ===
The fourth 2012 Indo-Tibetan Border Police expedition to Mount Everest led by Prem Singh recorded a total of eight persons reaching the summit, seven of them being Indian and one being a sherpa.

==== North Col side summiteers ====
- Krishna Prasad Gurung
- Pradeep Kumar Negi
- Pasang Tenzing Sherpa (2nd time of 2)
- Devendra Singh
- Virender Singh
- Ratan Singh Sonal
- Mingma Dorchi Sherpa

=== 2012 Indian Army Women Everest Expedition ===
The 2012 Indian Army Women Everest Expedition led by Lt. Colonel Ajay Kothiyal recorded a total of 28 persons reaching the summit, fifteen of them being Indians and thirteen being sherpas,

==== South Col side summiteers ====
- Neha Bhatnagar
- Prabhu Dayal Bisht
- Prachi Ramesh Gole
- Rajendra Singh Jalal (2nd time of 3)
- Ranveer Singh Jamwal(1st time of 3)
- Gary Jarman Lamare
- Smitha Laxman (first woman from Karnataka)
- Neikhrietuonuo Linyu (1st Naga to Summit Mt Everest)
- Sherab Palden
- Deepika Rathore (first time of 2)
- Namrata Rathore
- Poonam Sangwan
- Sudhir Singh (first time of 2)
- Tejpal Singh Negi (2nd time of 2)
- Praveen Thapa
- Satyadeep Gupta( 2 times)

=== 2012 Indian Army Snow Lion Everest Expedition ===
The 2012 Indian Army Snow Lion Everest Expedition led by Lt. Colonel Bhupesh Hada recorded a total of eleven persons reaching the summit, seven of them being Indian and four being sherpas.

==== South Col side summiteers ====
- Bhupesh Hada
- Chokyi
- Chomphel
- Thupten Lobsang (second time of two)
- Tenpa Tashi
- Thakpa Tenzing
- Tamding Tsewang

=== 2012 Himalayan Mountaineering Institute Everest Expedition ===
The 2012 Himalayan Mountaineering Institute Everest Expedition by Himalayan Mountaineering Institute on 2012 led by Lt. Colonel Neeraj Rana recorded a total of ten persons reaching the summit, six of them being Indians and four being sherpas.

==== South Col side summiteers ====
- Ngodup Bhutia
- Kamal Nayan
- Yamuna Prasad Paneru
- Pawel Sharma
- Phuchung Sherpa
- Mahavir Singh

=== Other summiteers of 2012 ===
- Kazi Sherpa (first time of 2)
- Shrihari Ashok Tapkir
- Sagar Sanjay Palkar
- Anand Ashok Bansode
- Toolika Rani
- Ashish Sharad Mane
- Prasad Narendra Joshi
- Krishna Sukhadev Dhokale
- Chetan Shirish Ketkar
- Rupesh Bharat Khopade
- Surendra Ravindra Jalihal
- Rahul Balu Yelange
- Kapil Ruhil Singh
- Loveraj Singh Dharmshaktu (4th time of 7)
- Rajendra Singh Pal
- Meghlal Mahato
- Binita Soren

=== 2013 ===
2013 recorded a total of 67 ascents by Indians. Eleven of them were by women all ascending from the South side (Nepal).

On 19 May 2013, Ravindra Kumar became the first Indian Administrative Officer to climb the Mt. Everest. On 23 May 2019, Kumar became the first Indian Administrative Officer to climb the Mt. Everest twice.

On 21 May 2013, Arunima Sinha became the first female amputee to scale Mount Everest.

Nungshi Malik and Tashi Malik summited, becoming the first twins to climb Mount Everest together.

The 2013 Indo Nepal Joint Army Everest Expedition led by Colonel Ranveer Singh Jamwal recorded a total of 43 persons reaching the summit, eleven of them being Indians and 32 being sherpas.

==== South Col side summiteers ====
- Ranveer Singh Jamwal (2nd time of 3)
- Unnikannan A. P. Veetil (first time of 2), first man from Kerala
- Mingmar Gurung
- Rajendra Singh Jalal (3rd time of 3)
- Manoj Joshi
- Hajari Lal (first time of 2)
- Chatter Singh
- Shivraj Singh
- Sudhir Singh (2nd time of 2)
- Sukhvir Singh
- Sonam Thinlas

=== 2013 National Cadet Corp (NCC) Everest Expedition ===
The 2013 National Cadet Corps NCC Everest Expedition led by Satish Chander Sharma recorded a total of 25 persons reaching the summit, eleven of them being Indians and fourteen being sherpas.

==== South Col side summiteers ====
- Rajat Boktapa
- Raghuveer Chand
- Shankar Singh Chirom
- Ashwani Kumar
- Rafiq Ahmed Malik
- Jagat Singh Negi (3rd time of 3)
- Bidyachand Singh Phairembam
- Sandeep Rai
- Khimi Ram Thakur
- Arvind Raturi
- Karma Dawa Thakur

The 2013 Special Service Bureau (SSB) Everest Expedition by Sashastra Seema Bal led by Somit Joshi recorded a total of eleven persons reaching the summit, five of them being Indians and six being sherpas.

==== South Col side summiteers ====
- Somit Joshi
- Tame (Man) Bagang
- Subodh Kumar Chandola
- Vinod Singh Negi
- Rahul Kumar Tyagi

The 2013 North East India Everest Expedition led by Surjit Singh Leishangthem recorded a total of 21 persons reaching the summit, eleven of them being Indians and ten being sherpas.

==== South Col side summiteers ====
- Manish Kumar Deka
- Anand Gurung
- Anshu Jamsenpa (3rd time of 5)
- Nima Lama
- Chinekheinganba Nameirakpam
- Bidyapati Devi Ningthoutam
- Mohon Puyamcha
- Tarun Saikia
- Kazi Sherpa (2nd time of 2)
- Myrthong Wansuk (first woman from Meghalaya)
- David Zohmangaiha
- 2013 The Lawrence School, Sanawar Everest Expedition

The Lawrence School, Sanawar Everest Expedition led by Neeraj Rana recorded a total of thirteen persons reaching the summit, seven of them being Indians and six being sherpas.

==== South Col side summiteers ====
- Fateh Singh Brar
- Prithvi Singh Chahal
- Raghav Joneja
- Shubham Kaushik
- Guribadat Singh Somal
- Ajay Sohal

=== Other summiteers of 2013 ===
==== South Col side summiteers ====
- Bhushan Uday Harshe
- Anand Shivling Mali
- Ganesh Krishna More
- Ravindra Kumar
- Prem Kumar Singh
- Tusi Das
- Chhanda Gayen
- Ujjal Ray
- Debdas Nandy
- Anita Devi (first time of 2)
- Sushen Mahato
- Kanta Manu Devi
- Loveraj Singh Dharmshaktu (5th time of 7)
- Hemant Sachdev
- Ramlal Sharma
- Sanjay Kodain Sanzu
- Satyabrata Dam (2nd time of 2)
- Murad Lala

=== 2014 ===
2014 recorded a total of five ascents by Indians and one by a woman, all from the North side (China/Tibet).

The 2014 Transcend Adventures Everest Expedition led by Shekhar Babu Bachinepally created a new history. On 25 May 2014, Malavath Poorna became the youngest girl in the world to have reached the summit (being 13 years and 11 months).

==== North Col side summiteers ====
- Malavath Poorna (Youngest girl in the world to climb Mount Everest )
- Sadhanapalli Anand Kumar
- Kishor Dattatraya Dhankude (first time of 2)
- Biplab Baidya
- Debabrata Mukherjee

=== 2016 ===
2016 recorded a total of 50 ascents by Indians, fifteen of them by women. One death was recorded. Six ascended from the north side (China/ Tibet) and 44 from the south side (Nepal).

The 2016 Transcend Adventures Everest Expedition led by Shekhar Babu Bachinepally recorded a total of thirteen persons reaching the summit, five of them being Indians and eight being sherpas.

==== North Col side summiteers ====
- Suhail Sharma
- Dhubi Bhadraiah
- S. Prabakaran
- Balan Shivaraman
- Gollapalli Ramamurthy Radhika
- Aparna Kumar

The 2016 Indian Army Everest Massif Expedition led by Colonel Ranveer Singh Jamwal recorded a total of 27 persons reaching the summit, ten of them being Indians and seventeen being sherpas.

==== South Col side summiteers ====
- Ranveer Singh Jamwal (3rd time of 3)
- K. Siva Kumar (first person from Tamil Nadu)
- Hajari Lal (2nd Time of 2)
- Ankur Rawat
- Unnikannan A. P. Veetil (2nd time of 2), first Keralite to climb Everest twice
- Mirza Zahid Baig
- Umesh Rai
- Pratap Singh
- Rinzin Dorje Bodh
- Dorjey Gyalson

The 2016 National Cadet Corps (NCC) Girls Everest Expedition led by Guarav Karki recorded a total of 28 persons reaching the summit, fourteen of them being Indians and fourteen being sherpas.

==== South Col side summiteers ====
- Guarav Karki
- Rigzen Dolker
- Lalrintluangi
- Tashi Laskit
- Pooja Mehra
- Deepika Rathore (2nd time of 2)
- Balkar Singh
- Sulaxchana Tamang
- Tsering Angmo
- Trishala Gurung
- Stanzin Laskit
- Vishal Ahlawat
- Dolyne Kharbhih
- Kumari Nutan

The 2016 Satori Adventurous International Everest Expedition led by Jitesh Popatial Mody recorded a total of sixteen persons reaching the summit, six of them being Indians and ten being sherpas.

==== South Col side summiteers ====
- Debraj Dutta
- Kuntal Ajit Joisher
- Bhagwan Singh Kushwah
- Chetna Sahoo
- Pradeep Chandra Sahoo
- Rafik Taher Shaikh

The 2016 Seven Summit Trecks Everest Expedition led by Iranian Azim Gheychisaz recorded a total of 25 persons reaching the summit, seven of them being Indians.

==== South Col side summiteers ====
- Naba Kumar Phukon
- Narender yadav
- Seema Rani
- Rudra Prasad Haldar
- Malay Mukherjee
- Ramesh Chandra Roy
- Satyarup Siddhanta (first from Karnataka)

=== Other summiteers in 2016 ===
==== South Col side summiteers ====
- Nanda Dulal Das
- Henry David Teran
- Khorsing Terang
- Ankur Bahl
- Subhash Pal (died from exhaustion)
- Ratnesh Pandey
- Harshad Kamalaksha Rao

=== 2017 ===
2017 recorded a total of 49 ascents by 48 Indians (double ascent Anshu Jamsenpa), with seven ascents by six women. Eighteen ascended from the North side (China/ Tibet) and 31 from South side (Nepal). One death was recorded.

Anshu Jamsenpa became the first woman to scale the summit of Mount Everest twice in a season (and the first to do so within 5 days). Her ascents are also the fastest double ascents of the tallest crest by a woman. This was her fifth summit and made her the Indian woman that climbed Everest the most times. She summited on the 16 and 21 May 2017.

The 2017 Transcend Adventures Everest Expedition led by Shekhar Babu Bachinepally recorded a total of 37 persons reaching the summit, sixteen of them being Indians and 21 being sherpas.

==== North Col side summiteers ====
- Bharath Thammineni
- Dharma Teja Mothukuri
- Suresh Babu Gullamarusu
- Nagaraju Sundarana
- Satya Rao Kare
- Krishna Rao Vooyaka
- Durga Rao Kunja
- Sagar Bodla
- Chenna Rao Gajavelli
- Eswaraiah Seelam
- Hari Prasad Ganugapenta
- Sunda Raju Repalle
- Rani Boddu
- Asha Singh
- Sandhya Bai Vadithe
- Aparna Arvind Prabhudesai

==== North Col side summiteers ====
Anita Devi became the first Indian woman to climb the peak from both sides (she had climbed the peak from the south side in 2013).

The 2017 Indian Navy Everest-Lhotse Expedition by Indian Navy led by Lieutenant Commander Sanjay K. Kulkarni recorded a total of 20 persons reaching the summit, nine of them being Indians and eleven being sherpas. Lieutenant Commander Vinit Doshi was the deputy leader.

==== South Col side summiteers ====
- Shashank Tewari
- Chandraveer Singh Yadav
- Anant Kukreti
- Bikas Maharana
- Avinash Kalyan Bawane, NM
- Hari Om
- Nagarajan Hari Prasath
- Ashish Gupta
- Sandeep Singh

The 2017 Indian Army Snow Lion Everest Expedition led by Vishal Dubey recorded a total of thirteen persons reaching the summit, seven of them being Indians and six being sherpas.

==== South Col side summiteers ====
- Karma Zopa
- Kalden Panjur
- Sonam Phuntsok
- Urgen Topgye
- Kunchok Tenpa (2nd time of 2)
- Ngawang Gelek
- Kelsang Dorjee Bhutia

The 2017 Asian Trekking ONGC Eco Everest Expedition by Oil and Natural Gas Corporation led by Satendra K. Sangwan recorded a total of sixteen persons reaching the summit, seven of them being Indians and nine being sherpas.

==== South Col side summiteers ====
- Love Raj Singh Dharmshaktu (6th time of 7)
- Yogendar Garbiyal
- Ngayaising Jagoi
- Rahul Jarngal
- Prabhat Gaurav
- Nirmal Kumar
- Santosh Kumar Singh

==== Other South Col side summiteers ====
- Kishor Dattatraya Dhankude (2nd time of 2)
- Brij Mohan Sharma
- Ravi Kumar (Died)
- Hemant Gupta
- Kuntal Kanrar
- Mohammed Sahabuddin

=== 2018 ===
2018 recorded a total of 69 ascents by Indians with eight of them by women. Eighteen ascended from the North Col and 51 from the South Col. Ajeet Bajaj and Dia Susanna Bajaj, a father-daughter duo from Delhi, made history by summiting Mount Everest on 16 May. Sangeeta Sindhi Bahl became the oldest Indian woman to have scaled the peak at the age of 53.

The second Border Security Force (BSF) Everest Expedition 2018, led by Love Raj Singh Dharmshaktu, recorded a total of 30 persons to reach the summit.

South Col side summiteers

- Love Raj Singh Dharmshaktu
- Pritam Chand
- Anwar Hussain
- Aasif Jaan
- Praveen Kumar
- Parveen Singh
- Vikash Singh Rawat
- Suresh Chhetri
- Manoj Dahal
- Ravi Kant Negi
- Kamlesh Kumar
- Suneel Kumar
- Avinash Negi
- Kedar Singh
- Darshan Tamang

The 2018 Uttarakhand State Police Everest Expedition led by Sanjay Kumar Gunjyal recorded a total of sixteen persons reaching the summit, eight of them being Indians and eight being sherpas.

South Col side summiteers

- Manoj Kumar Joshi
- Vijendra Kuriyal
- Praveen Singh
- Yogesh Singh
- Suryakant Uniyal
- Ravi Chauhan
- Virendra Prasad
- Sanjay Kumar Upreti

The 2018 NIMAS India Everest Expedition by National Institute of Mountaineering and Allied Sports led by Colonel Sarfraz Singh recorded a total of thirteen persons reaching the summit, with eight of them being Indians and five being sherpas.

==== South Col side summiteers ====
- Sarfraz Singh Kular
- Dorjee Khandu
- Gajur Man Rai
- Hem Singh
- Pravendra Kumar
- Sanjay Kumar
- Tongchen Nimsonga
- Ram Singh Rawat

The 2018 Force Motors Everest Expedition led by Sauraj Jhingan recorded a total of four persons reaching the summit, with two of them being Indians and two being sherpas.

South Col side summiteers

- Sauraj Jhingan
- Samir Nicholas Patham

Eighteen other people reached the summit as part of different expeditions. They were:

- Bhagwan Bhikoba Chawale
- Prajit Rasiklal Pardeshi
- Sangeeta Sindhi Bahl
- Tamut Taka
- Kishon Tekseng
- Amit Kumar
- Sandeep Mansukhani
- Sandeep Toliya
- Navdeep Bittu
- Swarnalata Dalai
- Manisha Jaykrishna Waghmare
- Poonam
- Rahul Gupta
- Muri Linggi
- Rohtash Khileri
- Shivangi Pathak
- Vikas Shambhu Prasad Dimri (Vikas Dimri)

The 2018 Transcend Adventurous Everest Expedition led by Shekhar Babu Bachinepally recorded a total of 40 persons reaching the summit, with eighteen of them being Indians and 22 being sherpas.

North Col side summiteers

- Himamsa Shaik
- Raja Kojja
- Kavidas Pandurang Katmode
- Umakant Suresh Madavi
- Pramesh Sitaram Ale
- Manisha Dharma Dhurve
- Mehul Pravinchandra Joshi
- Venkata Surya Prakash Korikala
- Ajeet Bajaj
- Deeya Suzannah Bajaj
- Asha Kiran Rani Koyyi
- Praveen Kumar Jujjavarapu
- Raju Gosala
- Borage Prasanna Kumar
- Bhanu Surya Prakash Podudolu
- Vikas Mahadeo Soyam
- Vikram Chandra Naik
- Venkatesh Maheshwari

=== 2019 ===
2019 recorded a total of 77 ascents by Indians (with eighteen of them by women) from both South Col and North Col side.

South Col side summiteers

- Milind Raskar
- Megha Parmar
- Aditya Gupta
- Romil Barthwal
- Bhawna Dehariya
- Abdul Nassar P
- Keval Kakka
- Aditi Vaidya
- Anuja Vaidya
- Vivek Thakur

North Col side summiteers

1. Ravindra Kumar became the first Indian Administrative Officer to climb Everest twice on 23 May 2019.
2. Kuntal Joisher
3. Parth Upadhyay

== 2020s ==
There were no summit attempts in 2020 as Nepal and Tibet, as both sides were closed during the mountaineer COVID-19 pandemic.

=== 2021 ===
- Harshvardhan Joshi
- Col. Amit Bisht
- Manish Kashniyal
- Neeraj Choudhary

=== 2022 ===
- Piyali Basak
- Savita Kanswal
- Shaikh Hassan Khan Ali Shahida
- Sidharth Routray
- Praveen Singh Rana from
- Prakriti Varshney

=== 2023 ===
- Yaashi Jain
- Muthamilselvi Narayanan
- Ashish Singh

=== 2024 ===
- Kaamya Karthikeyan, became the youngest Indian and the second youngest female in the world to climb the peak from the north side.
- Jyoti Ratre (became the oldest Indian woman to summit Mount Everest at the age of 55, breaking the previous national record of 53 years)
- Satyadeep Gupta (world record for dual Everest and Lhotse climb in less than 12 hours)

=== 2025 ===
- The largest expeditionary force to reach the summit of Mount Everest consisted of 49 climbers from the Indian Army Adventure Wing, including 22 members of the Indian Army and 27 Sherpas who successfully summited on 27 May 2025 as part of the Indian Army's Silver Jubilee Everest Expedition, led by Lieutenant Colonel Manoj Joshi, making it one of the largest coordinated summit efforts by a single organized team on the world's highest mountain, having a Guinness World Records Title.
- The National Cadet Corps (NCC) expedition team successfully summited Mount Everest (8,848 m) on 18 May 2025, marking a significant milestone for the organization. The expedition comprised ten NCC cadets, including five boys and five girls, along with four officers, two Junior Commissioned Officers, one Girl Cadet Instructor, and ten Non-Commissioned Officers, reflecting the structured and gender-balanced representation within the team.

See also

- List of Mount Everest records of India
- List of Mount Everest records
- List of Mount Everest summiteers by frequency
- Sports in India – Overview of 'sports in India'.
