= Bhawna Dehariya =

Indian mountaineer

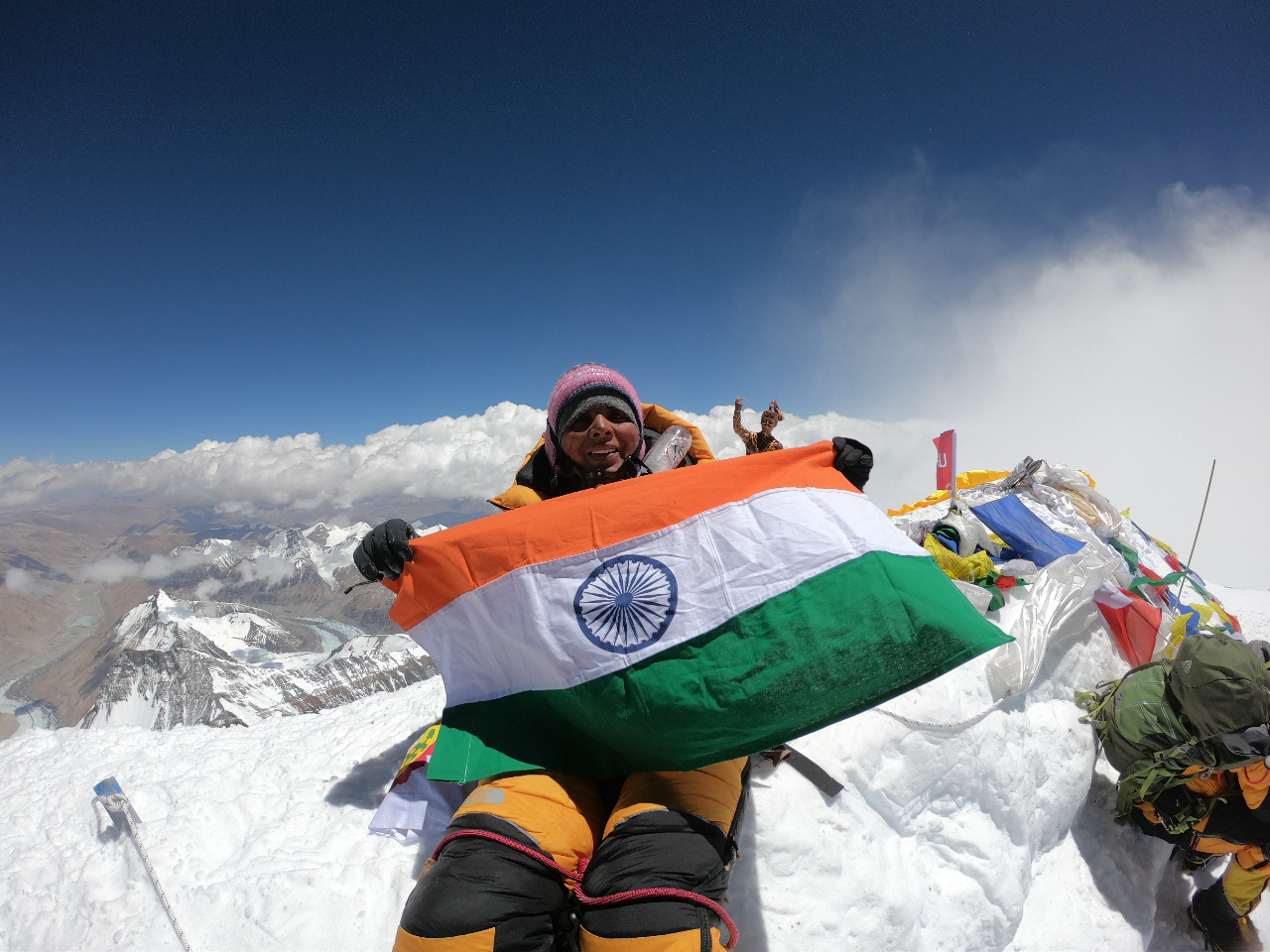

Personal information
- Nationality: India
- Born: 12 November 1991 (age 34) Village sheor, District Chhindawara, Madhya Pradesh, India
- Spouse: Mahim Mishra
- Parents: Munna Lal Dehariya (father), Uma Devi (mother)

Climbing career
- Major ascents: The first woman from Madhya Pradesh to reach the summit of Mount Everest
- Known for: Mount Everest Summit

Bhawna Dehariya (born 12 November 1991) is an Indian mountaineer born in Village Tamia, District Chhindawara, Madhya Pradesh. She reached the summit of summit of Mount Everest on 22 May 2019. She holds a Guinness World Records title for promoting and popularising Indian Himalaya with the Himalayan Mountaineering Institute on 15 August 2020 (Independence Day). She is the Vice President and Brand Ambassador of Jan Parishad, a national level social enterprise. The Department of Women and Child Development appointed Dehariya and her daughter Siddhi Mishra as brand ambassadors for the ‘Beti Bachao, Beti Padhao’ campaign.

== Early life ==
Dehariya was born on 12 November 1991. She hails from Village Tamia, Chhindawara, Madhya Pradesh.

Dehariya has done Masters of Physical Education (M.P.Ed) and Bachelor of Physical Education (B.P.E & B.P.Ed) from VNS College of Physical Education and Management Studies affiliated to Barkatullah University, Bhopal. She holds Post Graduate Diploma in Naturopathy and Yogic Science from Mahatma Gandhi Chitrakoot Gramodaya Vishwavidyalaya. Bhawna also completed a judge course in sports climbing conducted by the Indian Mountaineering Foundation (IMF).

She has represented Madhya Pradesh by participating in numerous sports at the national level like cycle polo, artificial sports climbing (a form of rock climbing), basketball, and softball.

== Career ==
Dehariya holds her mountaineering certifications in Methods of Instructions (MOI), Advance Mountaineering (AMC), and Basic Mountaineering course (BMC) from Nehru Institute of Mountaineering, Uttarkashi, Uttarakhand with Grade 'A'. Bhawna was a speaker at TEDx and conducted over 50 motivational sessions at various colleges across India. She served as the brand ambassador for the 'Run Bhopal Run' Marathon for three consecutive years and has been a national coordinator of the All India Council of Physical Education (AICPE) since 2016.

In August 2018, she was selected by the Ministry of Sports and Youth Welfare, Government of India, Delhi for mountaineering where she climbed 6593 meters high at the Mount Manirang peak. In May 2019, Dehariya became the first woman from Madhya Pradesh to climb the world's highest peak, 8,848-metre-high Mount Everest in Nepal.

Bhawna helped organize the Bhoj Adventure Fest in Bhopal and the Patalkot Adventure Festival in Patalkot, Chhindwara district. In 2022, she led the 'Chhindwara Marathon' with the District Archeology, Tourism & Culture Council (DATCC) in Chhindwara. She was also involved in planning 'Jal Mahotsav 2020' at Hanumantia Khandwa, an event by the Madhya Pradesh Tourism Board.

At Ernst & Young, Bhawna works as a sports and culture consultant in the technical support unit for the Madhya Pradesh Government's Department of Tribal Affairs.

== Summits ==
No.	Continent	Peak	Height	Date of summit	Ref.
1	NSW, Australia	Mount Kosciuszko	2,228 m (7,310 ft)	10 March 2020	
2	Nepal, Asia	Mount Everest	8,848 m (29,029 ft)	22 May 2019	
3	Tanzania, Africa	Mount Kilimanjaro	5,895 m (19,341 ft)	27 October 2019	
4	Argentina, South America	Aconcagua	6,962 m (22,841 ft)	31 December 2019	
5	Himachal Pradesh, India, Asia	Mount Manirang	6,593 m (21,631 ft)	24 August 2018	
6	Uttarakhand, India, Asia	Draupadi ka Danda II	5,670 m (18,602 ft)	16 June 2017	
7	Europe	Mount Elbrus West	5,642 m (18510.5 ft)	15 August 2022	
8	Europe	Mount Elbrus East	5,621 m (18441.6 ft)	16 August 2022	

== Honors and awards ==
2020:

- Guinness World Records holder for promoting and popularising Indian Himalaya with the Himalayan Mountaineering Institute on 15 August 2020 (Independence Day)
- Honoured as and holds the position of Vice President and Brand Ambassador of Jan Parishad since 26 August 2020
- Received ‘Devi Award’ by the Chief Minister Kamal Nath of Madhya Pradesh in Indore in February 2020

2022:

- Honored the state's first female mountaineer and Everest achiever by the Governor of Madhya Pradesh, Mangubhai C. Patel.

=== Sports achievements ===
- Represented The All India Softball Championship, 2017, (Kochi)
- Represented National Basketball Championship at school level, 2008, (Jabalpur)
- Represented 12th Junior (Girls) Cycle Polo National Championship, 2008-09 (Kochi)

== See also ==
- Indian summiteers of Mount Everest
- Premlata Agarwal
- Malavath Purna
