= Ganesh Jena =

Indian mountaineer

Ganesh Chandra Jena (born 5 May 1972) is a mountaineer from Odisha, India. He reached the peak of Mount Everest on 18 May 2011 as the first male from the eastern state of Orissa. Two other Indians in his team were Amit Kumar from Haryana and Jackie Jack from Rajasthan. The team was headed by Anshu Jamsenpa. After Kalpana Dash, Ganesh Jena achieved this feat as the second Oriya and the first man from Odisha "Willpower, patience and determination hold the key to success. My target is to scale the Everest twice in one season," he said to media persons after his successful Everest mission.

== Personal life ==
He was born to Late Kantaru Jena in Sitapur, Paralakhemundi of Gajapati district in Odisha. Currently he resides in Bhubaneshwar and serves for Bhubaneswar Development Authority.

He was always inclined towards adventure sports since his youth and moved towards his goal despite poor financial conditions. He has participated in many more adventure sports.

== Climbing career ==
His mountaineering achievements are:

- 1996 - Mt. Bandarpunch Peak (21673 ft.)
- 1998 & 2005 - Mt. Stok Kangri Peak (two occasions)
- 1998 - Mt. Ladakhi Peak (5662 m)
- 1998 - Mt. Shetidhar Peak (5293 m)
- 1999 - Mt. Mamostong Kangri (24,400 ft.) Peak
- 1999 - Mt. Stok Kangri Peak
- 2000 - Mt. Golep Kangri Peak
- 2007 - Mt. Friendship Peak (5340 m)
- 2002 - Mt. Saser Kangri Peak (7672 m) organised by Y.A.M.A, Chandigarh.
- 18 May 2011 - Mount Everest (8848 m)
- 1 August 2015 - Mount Elbrus, Russia (5642 m)

In May 2013, he participated in Everest Marathon as a single participant from India.

He has participated in the National Adventure Festival at Chandigarh since 1995. He was a Guest Instructor for the National Adventure Festival from 2002 to 2009. Ganesh was honoured with "Adamaya Sahas Puruskar" by the Haryana government in 2013. He was to begin his Mount Kanchenjunga Mission from 1 April 2014 which was expected to end on 31 May. He was denied leave by his employer and he had to abort the mission.

On 26 July 2015, Ganesh Jena started climbing Mount Elbrus in Moscow, Russia. A six-member team from India headed by Ganesh unfurled Tiranga (the national flag) at 8:45 PM on 1 August 2015. Earlier in a grand ceremony former Sports and Youth Services director Dr Bimalendu Mohanty and former assistant director Ashok Mohanty flagged off Jena.

== See also ==
- Indian summiters of Mount Everest - Year wise
- List of Mount Everest summiters by number of times to the summit
- List of Mount Everest records of India
- List of Mount Everest records
