= Udghosh =

Sports festival in India

- Genre: Sports Festival; Non-Profit
- Dates: Friday, 4 October 2024, 6 October 2024
- Frequency: Annual
- Venue: Indian Institute of Technology, Kanpur
- Location: Kanpur
- Country: India
- Inaugurated: 2002; 24 years ago
- Attendance: 60,000+
- Patron: Indian Institute of Technology, Kanpur
- Organizer: Student Body, IIT Kanpur
- Website: udghosh.org.in

Udghosh is the Annual Sports Festival of Indian Institute of Technology Kanpur. Started in 2002, it has now evolved into one of the largest college sports festivals held in Asia. With notable sportspersons, brand ambassadors and participants from across the country, this three-day-long festival has garnered substantial media attention over the years. As many as 450 colleges and 40 government organizations actively participate and support this ceremonious event. It not only features sports competitions but also talk shows, music performances, DJs and other fun-filled activities.

== History ==
The 2017 edition was unique and had registered events and personalities, such as an inspiring talk by Abhinav Bindra, participation from Gaurav Taneja and sports personalities such as Nuzhat Parween.

The 2018 edition of Udghosh saw various performances, including standups by Nishant Tanwar and Aakash Gupta.

The 2021 edition included events and inspiring talks by personalities such as Avadh Ojha, Prakash Padukone, Kiran Bedi, Sangeeta Sindhi Bahl, and Sharad Kumar.

== Notable events ==
Udghosh, in its true sense, is an exhibition of sporting fervour, and success in the meet has been ratified by the success of many of its winners higher up in the sporting hierarchy. It offers a common platform for the students of the top educational institutions from all over to exhibit their skills. The Fest has witnessed some nonpareil speakers like Prakash Padukone, Medha Patkar, Dr Kiran Bedi, Sangeeta Sindhi Bahl, and sports stars such as Ashwini Ponnappa, Sharad Kumar, Sardar Singh. Udghosh umbrellas various events including sports competitions, talks with eminent celebrities, musical nights, standup events, dance performances and renowned pronite. The sports events encompass competitions of various sports - badminton, athletics, basketball, cricket, football, hockey, tennis, kabaddi, squash, table tennis, powerlifting, volleyball, and weight-lifting. The fest also has cultural events of performances from comedians, artists, and celebrated bands like AIP and The Local Train.
