= Arjun Vajpai =

Indian mountaineer

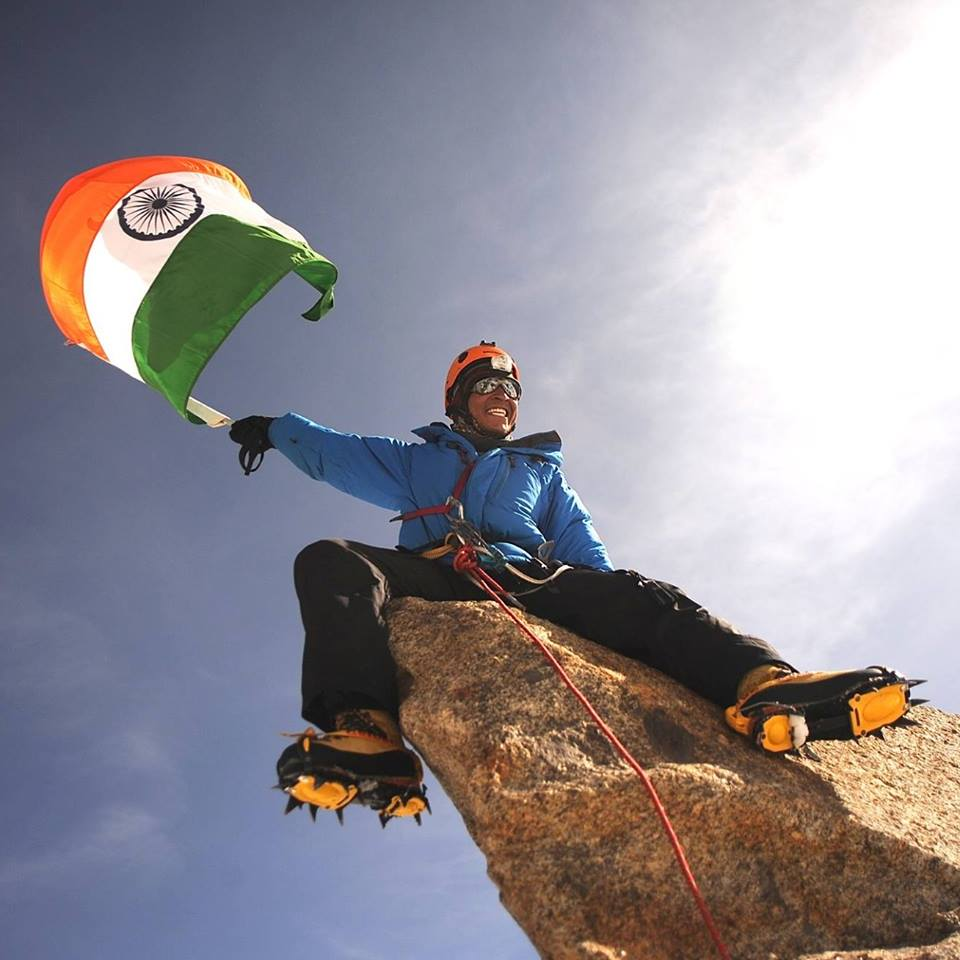
- Arjun on top of Mount Kalam.

Personal information
- Nationality: (India) Indian
- Born: 9 June 1993 (age 32) Mumbai, Maharashtra, India

Arjun Vajpai (born 9 June 1993) is an Indian mountaineer who became the world's youngest mountaineer to summit six peaks over 8,000 meters in the year 2018.

Arjun climbed Mount Everest in 2010 at the age of 16 years, 11 months, and 18 days, becoming the youngest Indian to climb Everest at that time. He broke a record set by Krushnaa Patil of Maharashtra, who climbed Mount Everest at the age of 19. On 20 May 2011, he became the youngest person ever to summit Lhotse, aged 17 years, 11 months, and 16 days.

== Personal life ==
Arjun Vajpai is the son of Col. Sanjeev Vajpai and Priya Vajpai from Noida. He studied at Ryan International School, Noida. He underwent training at the Nehru Institute of Mountaineering, Uttarkashi, Uttarakhand.

== Climbing career ==
Vajpai also climbed Manaslu on 4 October 2011. After three failed attempts on Mount Makalu, he climbed it on 22 May 2016, during his fourth attempt.

On 14 October 2015 Arjun Vajpai along with mountaineer Bhupesh Kumar scaled an unnamed peak 6,180 metres (20,280 feet) high in Spiti valley, Himachal Pradesh and named it Mount Kalam in memory of late President of India A. P. J. Abdul Kalam.

Arjun Vajpai scaled Cho Oyu accompanied by Pasang Norbu Sherpa and Lakpa Sherpa.

During one of his attempts at Mount Cho Oyu, Tibet (the easiest 8,000 metres peak), in 2012, he was paralysed for two days, at an altitude of 22,000 feet (6,700 metres). The Swiss adventurer Olivier Racine came to his rescue giving him appropriate medicine.

Vajpai was rescued from Mount Annapurna in April 2023 while returning from the summit.

== Summits ==
- 2010: Mount Everest (8,849 m)
- 2011: Manaslu (8,163 m)
- 2011: Lhotse (8,516 m)
- 2016: Cho Oyu (8,188 m)
- 2016: Makalu (8,485 m)
- 2018: Kangchenjunga (8,586 m)
- 2023: Annapurna (Rescued) (8,091 m)
- 2024: Shishapangma (8,027 m)

== See also ==
- List of Indian summiteers of Mount Everest
- List of Mount Everest summiteers by frequency
- List of Mount Everest records of India
- List of Mount Everest records
