= Nirupama Pandey =

Indian mountaineer

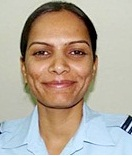
- Born: Jamo Jalalpur, Siwan, Bihar, India
- Status: Married
- Education: Ness Wadia College of Commerce, Pune
- Occupation: IAF Officer
- Known for: Being the first person from Bihar to scale Mount Everest
- Spouse: Wg Cdr Prakash Jha

Wing Commander Nirupama Pandey is an Indian mountaineer. She is the first person from Bihar to have scaled Mount Everest on 25 May 2011 at 1015 hrs (IST). Nirupama was part of the first-ever all-woman IAF team comprising flight lieutenant Nivedita Choudhary and flight lieutenant Rajika Sharma.

Her other climbs include Mount Stok Kangri (6121m) and Mount Golap Kangri (6100m) in Leh, Mount Kamet (7,757m) and Mount Abhigamin (7357m) in Garhwal and Mount Saser Kangri I (7672m) in Ladakh, Mt Trishul 7120m (Garhwal Region) and Mt Manirang 6593m (Himachal Region).

== Early life ==
Nirupama Pandey was born in the village of Jamo Jalalpur in Siwan district, the daughter of Shri Rajendra Pandey and Srimati Uma Pandey. She did her schooling from Kendriya Vidyalaya in Pune and graduated in Commerce and MBA in Finance and Marketing from Ness Wadia College of Commerce, Pune. In college, she was part of the National Cadet Corps and often went trekking. She started her mountaineering career in 2007 by undergoing rigorous training at Nehru Institute of Mountaineering located at Uttarkashi. In 2003, she joined the Indian Air Force as a flying officer.

== Family ==
In August 2009, Nirupama Pandey married Squadron leader Prakash Jha, who hails from Benipatti in Madhubani, Bihar.

== Everest climb ==
Sqn Ldr Nirupama Pandey reached the summit of Mount Everest on 25 May 2011 at 1015 hrs (IST), forming one of the first three women IAF officers, to create history. The team of eleven women officers was accompanied by one medical officer and eight male air warriors who were qualified mountaineers.

== Awards ==
In August 2011 Bihar CM Sri Nitish Kumar felicitated Squadron leader Nirupama Pandey in Patna for unfurling tricolour at Mount Everest. She was awarded Ati Vishisth Khel Samman by the Govt of Bihar.

== See also ==
- List of Indian women athletes
- Indian summiters of Mount Everest - Year wise
- List of Mount Everest summiters by number of times to the summit
- List of Mount Everest records of India
- List of Mount Everest records
