= Aparna Kumar =

Indian mountaineer

Aparna Kumar is an Indian mountaineer. In 2018, she was awarded the Tenzing Norgay National Adventure Award for land adventure, presented by the President of India.

== Career and training ==
Prior to mountaineering, Kumar was a 2002 batch IPS officer of the Uttar Pradesh cadre and commanded the 9th Battalion of PAC (Provincial Armed Constabulary), which guarded the Chinese border before the ITBP existed. As an IPS officer, she served in the high altitudes of Uttaranchal, manning the sensitive Indo-Tibetan border at Askot, Badrinath and Uttarkashi, whose jurisdiction was handed over to the Indo-Tibetan Border Police (ITBP) in 1992.

Kumar summited the Lobuche East peak (6,119 metres (20,075 ft)) in April 2013. In June 2013, Kumar climbed Stok Kangri (approximately 6,151 metres (20,180 ft)) in Ladakh, becoming the first IPS/All India Service officer to do so. She is also known for her expedition to the Seven Summits.

== Mountaineering conquests ==
=== Africa ===
On 30 August 2014, she summited Kilimanjaro (5,895 metres (19,341 ft)) in Tanzania in a 15-day journey.

=== Oceania ===
On 7 November 2014, Kumar climbed Puncak Jaya Mountain (4,884 metres (16,024 ft)).

=== South America ===
On 14 January 2015, she summited Mount Aconcagua (6,962 metres (22,841 ft)).

=== Europe ===
Kumar also summited Mount Elbrus in Russia (5,642 metres (18,510 ft)).

=== Antarctica ===
Kumar was part of a ten-member expedition team, alongside members from the USA, Canada, South Africa, the U.K., and Australia, to climb the Vinson Massif in Antarctica. During the expedition, Kumar also reached the Union Glacier in Antarctica.

=== Asia ===
Kumar summited Mount Everest on 21 May 2016, at 11:02 IST.

Kumar successfully climbed Stok Kangri (approximately 20,182 feet (6,151 m)) in Ladakh.

Kumar summited the Lobuche East peak (6,119 metres (20,075 ft)) in April 2013.

=== North America ===
In 2019, she climbed Denali in Alaska, completing her Seven Summits challenge.

== Awards ==
- Director's Gold Medal in "Political Concepts and Constitution of India, 72nd Foundation Course-2002", Lal Bahadur Shastri National Academy of Administration (LBSNAA), Mussoorie.
- Vandana Malim Trophy for Best Athlete - 2000 (LBSNAA) Mussoorie.
- Best Athlete Trophy 2003 from SVP National Police Academy (SVPNPA).
- The 51st Batch of Senior Course Officers' Trophy for the first position in Unarmed Combat 2003 SVPNPA.
- Vandana Malik Trophy for Dedication and Hard Work 2004, SVPNPA, Hyderabad.
- Best Battalion Trophy awarded to 9th Battalion of Provincial Armed Constabulary (PAC) on 13 December 2013 when she was posted as Commandant 9th Battalion, PAC, Moradabad.
- Grade-A Certificate and Trainee of Best Rope, Basic Mountaineering Course 2013 awarded by mountaineering institute (ABVIMAS, Manali, Himachal Pradesh, India).
- Grade-A Certificate Advanced Mountaineering Course 2014 awarded by mountaineering institute (ABVIMAS, Manali, Himachal Pradesh, India).
- Uttar Pradesh Rani Lakshmi Bai Veerta Puraskar - 2015
- Director General of Police (DGP) Commendation Disc. 2016.
- Yash Bharti Samman March 2016, the highest civilian award of Uttar Pradesh.
- Devi Award by Sunday Standard and Indian Express Group of Newspapers - November 2016
- Director General (DG), Indo-Tibetan Border Police (ITBP) Commendation Roll and Insignia Silver Disc 2018.
- Tenzing Norgay National Adventure Award, 2018 for Land Adventure.
- Director General (DG), Indo-Tibetan Border Police (ITBP) Commendation Rolland Insignia Gold Disc 2021.

== Personal life ==
Kumar is from Bengaluru and has two children. She is married to Mr Sanjay Kumar, an IAS officer of UP Cadre. She is an alumna of Vijaya College, Jaya Nagar, and National Law School, Bengaluru. She also did her schooling in Mysore. She speaks fluent Kannada and Hindi.

== See also ==
- Indian summiters of Mount Everest - Year wise
- List of Mount Everest summiters by number of times to the summit
- List of Mount Everest records of India
- List of Mount Everest records
