= Love Raj Singh Dharmshaktu =

Indian mountaineer

Love Raj Singh Dharmshaktu is an Indian mountaineer who has climbed Mount Everest seven times. He is a serving officer of Border Security Force and an accomplished instructor at BSF Institute of Advance Adventure Training (BIAAT)

He was awarded the Padma Shri by Government of India in 2014.

== Early life and background ==
Dharmshaktu is from Bona village, Pithoragarh district, Uttarakhand. He worked at Uttar Pradesh Tourism office on Special Duty and took his adventure course. Later he completed Basic Mountaineering and Advanced Mountaineering courses from Nehru Institute of Mountaineering (NIM) in 1990. He earned a specialisation in Search and Rescue.

=== Family life ===
His wife, Reena Kaushal Dharmshaktu from Delhi, is also a mountaineer and holds the record as the first woman from India to ski to reach the South Pole from the coast of the Antarctica, in 2009 as a part of 8-women Kaspersky Commonwealth Antarctica Expedition.

== Mountaineering experience ==
In 1989, Dharmashaktu climbed Nanda Kot (6861 meters), accompanying as a part of a mountaineering team from Lucknow. He reached the peak. He was part of mountaineering teams that attempted Mamostong Kangri (7516 mt) in Ladakh and Nanda Bhaner (6236 mt) during 1992. He was liaison officer for a British team that attempted Nanda Ghunti (6309mt) in 1997. In 2008, he reached the summit of Kanchenjunga (8586 mt) along with a BSF team. As of June 2012, he has climbed about 38 peaks.

=== Everest ascents ===
- In 1998, he summited Mt. Everest as a part of the first Indian civilian expedition.
- In 2006, he climbed Mt. Everest for the second time with a team of BSF.
- In 2009, he led a team of NIM to Everest and reached the summit.
- In May 2012, summit Everest again, as a member of Eco Everest Expedition, which also focussed on cleaning the mountain.
- On 21, May 2013, he reached the summit of Everest for the fifth time.
- On 27, May 2017, he summited for the sixth time while leading a team of Oil and Natural Gas Corporation Ltd (ONGC, India's National Oil Company) officers – 6 of whom also accomplished the feat.
- On 8, June 2017, he was honoured by Nepal at a function organised by Adventure Sports Tourism Society in Lalitpur city near Kathmandu as he became the first person from India to summit Mount Everest for a record six times.
- On 20 May 2018 Dharmsaktu summited for the seventh time while leading a team of 15 members of the Border Security Force. This team has created a new world record of placing the Highest number of members permitted which was earlier of 14 members by the Indian Army.

== Recognition and awards ==
- 2003 – Tenzing Norgay National Adventure Award by Prime Minister of India for outstanding achievement in mountaineering
- 2003 – Award by Sir Edmund Hillary on Golden Jubilee Celebrations of Everest organised by IMF
- 2003 2006 & 2018 – Award of DGCR (Director General's Commendation Rule) by the Director General BSF for outstanding performance in BSF
- 2006 – Memento by Union Home Minister after summit of Everest
- 2009 – Gold Medal for excellence in mountaineering by Indian Mountaineering Foundation
- 2014 – Padma Shri by President of India
- Honoured by permanent membership of Indian Mountaineering Foundation

== See also ==
- List of Indian summiteers of Mount Everest
- List of Mount Everest records
- List of Mount Everest records of India
- List of Mount Everest summiteers by frequency
