= Savita Kanswal =

Indian mountaineer

Personal information
- Full name: Savita Kanswal
- Nationality: India
- Born: Uttarakhand, India
- Died: October 4, 2022 Draupadi Ka Danda, Uttarkashi district

Climbing career
- Major ascents: Mount Everest, Makalu

Savita Kanswal was an Indian mountaineer hailing from Uttarakhand. She is the first Indian woman to conquer both Mount Everest and Makalu within 16 days. She died in an avalanche accident on October 4, 2022. In January 2024, she posthumously received the Tenzing Norgay National Adventure Award, the highest honor in adventure sports in India. Kanswal was posthumously awarded Gold Medal Award by Indian Mountaineering Foundation in December 2024.

== Early life ==
Savita Kanswal was born into a lower-middle-class farming family in the remote Lonthru village of Uttarkashi. She was the youngest of four sisters. In 2013, she completed basic and advanced mountaineering courses at the Nehru Institute of Mountaineering (NIM), Uttarkashi.

== Career ==
Kanswal set a national record in May 2022 by raising the Flag of India on Mount Everest, the world's highest peak. She climbed Mount Everest (8848 m) on May 12, 2022, achieving this milestone on the 16th day. On May 28, 2022, she climbed Makalu (8485 m), the world's fifth-highest peak.

Under the pre-Everest campaign, Savita successfully climbed five peaks across India, including Trisul. She served as an instructor for the Nehru Institute of Mountaineering's Advanced Mountaineering Course (NIM) at Draupadi Ka Danda Peak.

== Death ==
Savita died on October 4, 2022, in an avalanche at Mount Draupadi Ka Danda-2 peak in Uttarakhand's Uttarkashi district. Following tradition, she was given a 'jal samadhi' (water burial), a practice observed in Uttarakhand for unmarried women with no brothers.

The Chief Minister of Uttarakhand, Pushkar Singh Dhami has announced the renaming of Maneri Inter College after Savita. She was posthumously honored with the 2022 Tenzing Norgay National Adventure Award by the Government of India.
