= Tarun Saikia =

Indian mountaineer

Tarun Saikia তৰুণ শইকীয়া and Manish Kumar Deka
Personal information
- Nationality: (India) Indian
- Born: Tarun Saikia Assam
- Parents: Atul Saikia (late) (father); Charu Saikia (mother)

Sport
- Country: India
- Sport: Mountaineering

Achievements and titles
- Highest world ranking: Conquered Everest on 18 May 2013

Tarun Saikia (Assamese: তৰুণ শইকীয়া) is a mountaineer and the first climber from Assam to scale Mount Everest. He reached its summit on 18 May 2013. Manipur mountaineering and trekking association had organised the expedition under the leadership of Dr L Surjit Singh. In the team there were thirteen members, of which eleven summited successfully.

== About Tarun Saikia ==
Tarun Saikia comes from Guwahati. He is a resident of Forest Gate, Noonmati (in Guwahati). His parents are (late) Atul Saikia and Charu Saikia.

At the age of 37, Saikia climbed Mount Everest. The expedition was sponsored by the North Eastern Council and the Manipur Government. He loved adventure sports since his schooldays and he began mountaineering with an adventure club at Gauhati College in 1989. The Govt. of Assam had announced a cash award of Rs. 20 Lakhs for his feat.

== See also ==
- List of Indian summiteers of Mount Everest
- List of Mount Everest summiteers by frequency
- List of Mount Everest records of India
- List of Mount Everest records
