= Mohan Singh Gunjyal =

Indian mountaineer

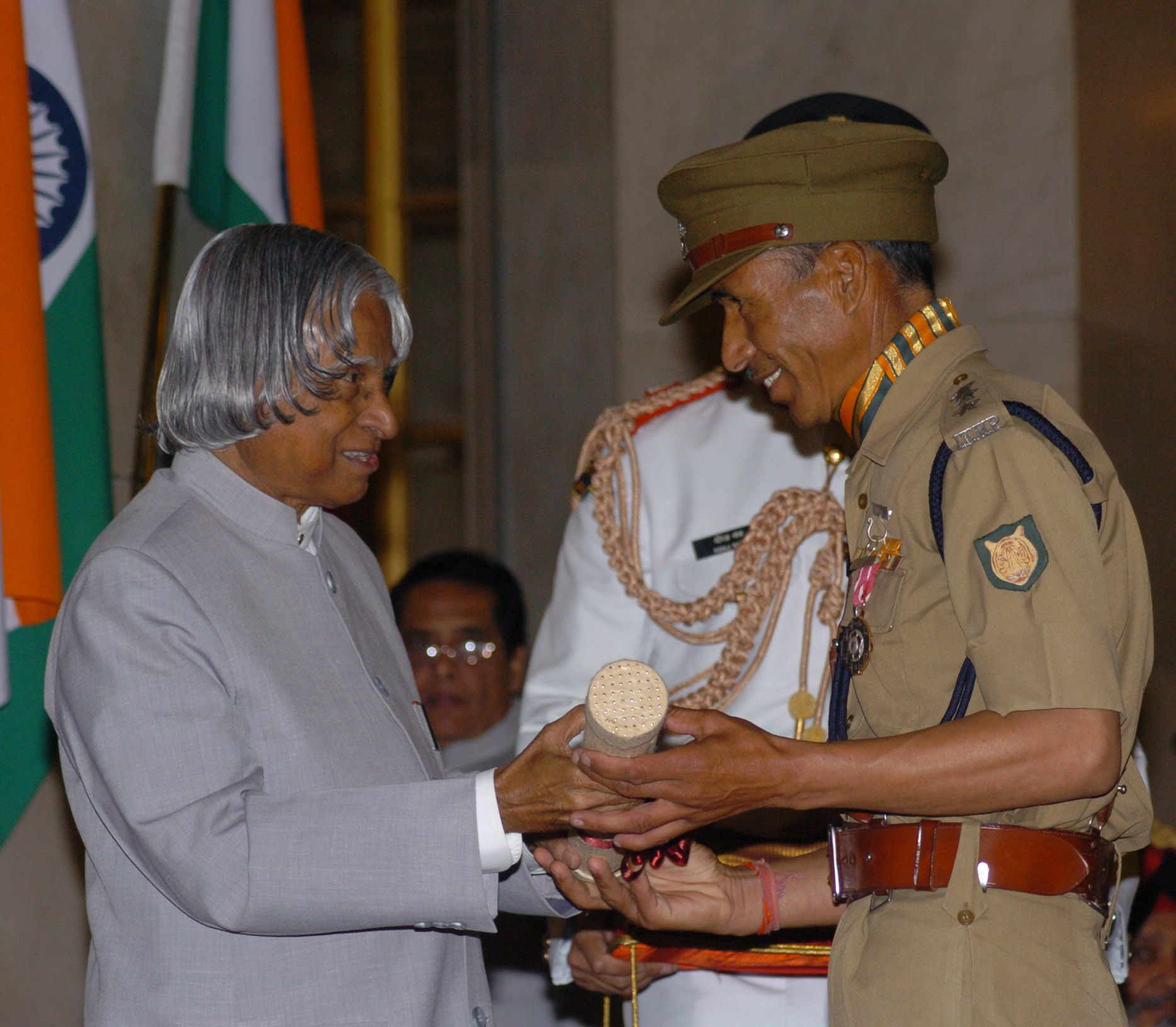
- Mohan Singh Gunjyal receiving Padma Shri from the President Dr. A.P.J. Abdul Kalam in 2006
- Born: India
- Occupation: Mountaineer
- Known for: Summiting Mount Everest
- Awards: Padma Shri

Mohan Singh Gunjyal is an Indian mountaineer and adventure sportsman. He is one of the summiters of Mount Everest, entering the list when he successfully climbed the highest peak in the world on 12 May 1992. He achieved the feat, taking the Southeast ridge route via the south face, as a member of the Indo-Tibetan Border Police Everest expedition group, which included Santosh Yadav, the first woman to summit the peak twice within a year. He has received the Tenzing Norgay National Award for outstanding achievement from the President of India in 2004. He is a former Assistant Commandant of Indo-Tibetan Border Police and presently working as Director (Technical Training) at the Uttarkashi-based Nanda Devi Institute of Adventure Sports and Outdoor Education. The Government of India awarded him with Tenzing Norgay National Adventure Award 2004 in lifetime achievement category and the fourth highest civilian honor of the Padma Shri, in 2006, for his contributions to the sport of mountaineering.

== See also ==
- Indian summiters of Mount Everest - Year wise
- List of Mount Everest summiters by number of times to the summit
- List of Mount Everest records of India
- List of Mount Everest records
