= Jyoti Ratre =

Indian entrepreneur and mountaineer

Personal information
- Nationality: India
- Born: 1969 (age 56–57) Bhopal, Madhya Pradesh, India
- Education: Bachelor of Science, M.A. (Economics)
- Occupation: Mountaineer

Climbing career
- Known for: Mount Everest Summit

Jyoti Ratre (born 1969) is an Indian mountaineer from Bhopal, Madhya Pradesh. On 29 May 2024, she became the oldest Indian woman to reach the summit of Mount Everest, the highest peak in the world, at the age of 55, breaking the previous national record of 53 years.

She climbed Mount Elbrus (5,642 m) in 2021, Mount Kilimanjaro (5,895 m) in 2021, and Mount Kosciuszko (2,228 m) in 2023, among other notable peaks.

== Early life and background ==
Jyoti Ratre was born in Madhya Pradesh, India. She completed her education in central India, earning degrees in science and economics.

== Mountaineering career ==
Ratre developed an interest in mountaineering after a trip to Manali and began training in 2018 at the age of 49. As some mountaineering institutes have age limits, she undertook self-directed training. Her early expeditions included the Sour Tal Trek (3,770 meters) in 2017, the Pin Parvati Pass (5,319 meters) in 2018, and Mahagunas Top (4,276 meters) during the Amarnath Yatra in 2019.

In 2021, Jyoti Ratre climbed Mount Elbrus (5,642 meters) in Europe and Mount Kilimanjaro (5,895 meters) in Africa. She later climbed Mount Kosciuszko (2,228 meters) in Australia. She climbed Island Peak (Imja Tse) in Nepal’s Sagarmatha National Park.

Her first attempt to summit Mount Everest was in May 2023, reaching 8,200 meters before turning back due to weather and a teammate's illness. She made a second attempt in May 2024 as part of a 15-member international team led by Bolivian climber David Hugo Ayaviri Quispe. On 19 May 2024, she reached the summit of Mount Everest (8,848.86 meters), becoming the oldest Indian woman to summit the mountain.

== Summits ==
Peak	Elevation (m)	Continent	Date of Summit
Sour Tal Trek	3770	Asia (India)	8 May 2017
Pin Parvati Pass	5319	Asia (India)	30 June 2018
Mahagunas Top (Amarnath)	4276	Asia (India)	10 July 2019
Deo Tibba	5226	Asia (India)	20 October 2020
Norbu Peak	5226	Asia (India)	22 October 2020
Mount Elbrus	5642	Europe (Russia)	8 July 2021
Mount Kilimanjaro	5895	Africa (Tanzania)	15 August 2021
Everest Base Camp	5364	Asia (Nepal)	26 January 2022
Satopanth Glacier	5800	Asia (India)	16 August 2022
Bermejo Pass	3937	South America	25 December 2022
Mount Aconcagua (attempted)	6960	South America	3 January 2023
Nagarjuna Hill	5100	Asia (Nepal)	12 April 2023
Island Peak (Imja Tse)	6100	Asia (Nepal)	17 April 2023
Mount Everest (aborted)	8200 (attempted)	Asia (Nepal)	23 May 2023
Mount Kosciuszko	2228	Australia	19 October 2023
Mount Everest	8849	Asia (Nepal)	19 May 2024
Mount Vinson (High Camp)	3780	Antarctica	29 December 2024

== Awards and recognition ==
In 2021, Ratre received the Indian Inspirational Women Award (IIWA) in recognition of her mountaineering achievements. She was also honored with the Madhya Pradesh Ratn Alankaran award by Governor Mangubhai C. Patel. In May 2025, the Bhopal Postal Department issued a commemorative My Stamp in her name, recognizing her contributions to mountaineering, environmental awareness, and tourism. On 11 June 2025, Ratre received the Patrika Tejaswini Award 2025 for her contributions.

== See also ==
- List of Indian summiters of Mount Everest
- List of Mount Everest records of India
- List of Mount Everest records
