= Arvind Raturi =

Indian mountaineer

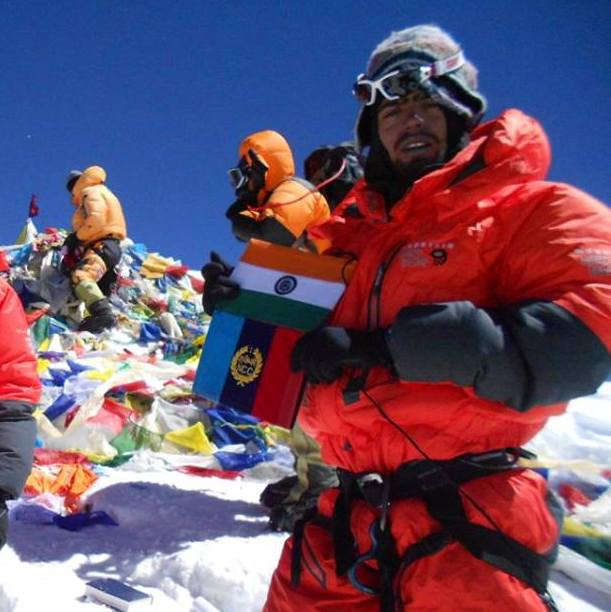
- At the summit of Mt Everest on 19 May 2013 Mount Kamet summit sep-oct 2012.which is 7756mtr.Third Highest Peak in India Mount Deo Tibba summit may 2012 6001mtr.

Personal information
- Nationality: Indian
- Born: 13 September 1992 (age 33) Tehri Garhwal, Uttarakhand

Climbing career
- Major ascents: Mount Everest in 2013

Arvind Raturi (Hindi: अरविंद रतूड़ी; born 6 June 1992) is the mountaineer from Uttarakhand to scale Mount Everest at the age of 20. As a member of the NCC (National Cadet Corps) Mt Everest Expedition 2013, Arvind summited the world’s highest peak on 19 May 2013 at 0730 hours (IST).And become the youngest Mount Everest summiter form uttarakhand.

Arvind is a resident of Rindol village of Pratapnagar Tehsil in Tehri Garhwal district of Uttarakhand, India.

== NCC Pre-Everest Expeditions and training ==
To select the team for Mt Everest Expedition, 108 (one hundred and eight) NCC boy cadets were shortlisted from across the country and trained at Nehru Institute of Mountaineering, Uttarkashi. Thereafter, forty cadets were selected for the next stage i.e. Mount Deo Tibba Expedition (6,001 m/ 19,688 ft). The peak is located in District Kullu of Himachal Pradesh with treacherous snow and ice slopes of gradient between 50-75 degrees.

After successful expedition to Mount Deo Tibba in June 2012, 15 (fifteen) cadets were selected for the next Pre-Everest Expedition to Mount Kamet. Mount Kamet at 7,756 m/ 25,446 ft is the third highest peak in India located in Garhwal region of Uttarakhand and is the highest peak which is permitted to be climbed in India.

Nine cadets were finally selected and sent for winter acclimatization training to Siachen Glacier exposing them to extreme cold conditions where minimum temperatures fell to minus 50 (fifty) degrees Celsius.

== NCC Mt Everest Expedition 2013 ==
The NCC Mt Everest Expedition Team 2013 was led by Col S.C. Sharma, a renowned mountaineer, with 18 (eighteen) members: nine cadets from the NCC and nine Indian Army personnel. The team of 18 members consisted of 14 climbing members and four support staff.

Eight NCC cadets and four Army personnel scaled Mount Everest in two teams on 19 and 20 May 2013. The NCC cadets who scaled the peak were Cadets Khimi Ram, Ashwani Kumar, Rajat and Karma Dawa of Himachal Pradesh, Cadets Bidya Chand Singh and Chirom Shangkar Singh from Manipur, Cadet Sandeep Rai from West Bengal and Cadet Arvind Raturi from Uttarakhand. The Army personnel who scaled the peak were Subedar Jagat Singh Negi of Dogra Scouts, Havildar Rafiq Ahmed Malik of JAK LI, Havildar Raghuveer Chand of Garhwal Rifles and Rifleman Ramesh Bahadur Thapa of 3rd Gorkha Rifles.

Arvind was part of the first team that left Base Camp on 16 May 2013 occupying Camp II, Camp III and Camp IV (South Col) and summitted on 19 May 2013 at 0730 hrs (IST).

== Recognition and awards ==
The NCC Mt Everest Expedition Team 2013 was welcomed by Director General of NCC Lt Gen P.S. Bhalla who remarked that history was created by this young team to be the "First pure NCC Expedition to summit the pinnacle of glory "The Mount Everest".

The team was congratulated by Prime Minister Dr. Manmohan Singh at the NCC Rally 2014 in New Delhi who was quoted as saying "I wish to take this opportunity to compliment the NCC Boy Cadets for scaling the world’s highest peak in their first-ever Mount Everest Expedition. It is a tribute to their teamwork, planning, stamina and skill. The nation is proud of their achievements".

The nine cadets forming part of NCC Everest Expedition Team 2013 were conferred the Raksha Mantri Padak by Defence Minister A.K. Antony at the NCC Republic Day Camp 2014 in New Delhi. The Raksha Mantri Padak was instituted in 1989 and since then, is awarded to the most deserving cadets every year for bravery or exceptional service of highest order.

Arvind Raturi receives COAS Commendation Card

In 2024, Arvind Raturi was awarded the COAS (Chief of the Army Staff) Commendation Card by General Upendra Dwivedi, the 30th Chief of the Army Staff of India, who assumed office on 30 April 2024. This honor recognized his exceptional service, operational contribution, and his role in preparing soldiers for high-altitude and extreme winter conditions.

National Games Silver Medal (2024)

In 2024, Arvind Raturi competed in the Water Ski Slalom event at the National Games organized by the Wakeboard & Water Ski Federation of India and won the Silver Medal. This achievement highlighted his skill in watersports and his ability to perform at a competitive national level.

== Other interests ==
Arvind is professionally trained in aquatic adventure sports including kayaking, canoeing, water skiing, Snow Skier, Mountain Bikes, Mountain and Avalanche RescuerParagliding, surfing.

== Community service ==
Arvind is trained in mountain rescue from Nehru Institute of Mountaineering (NIM) Uttarkashi. He was actively involved in the rescue operations during 2013 flash floods in the Kedarnath valley in Uttarakhand.

== See also ==
- Indian summiters of Mount Everest - Year wise
- List of Mount Everest summiters by number of times to the summit
- List of Mount Everest records of India
- List of Mount Everest records
