= Unnikannan A. P. Veetil =

Indian mountaineer

Unnikannanan A. P. Veetil
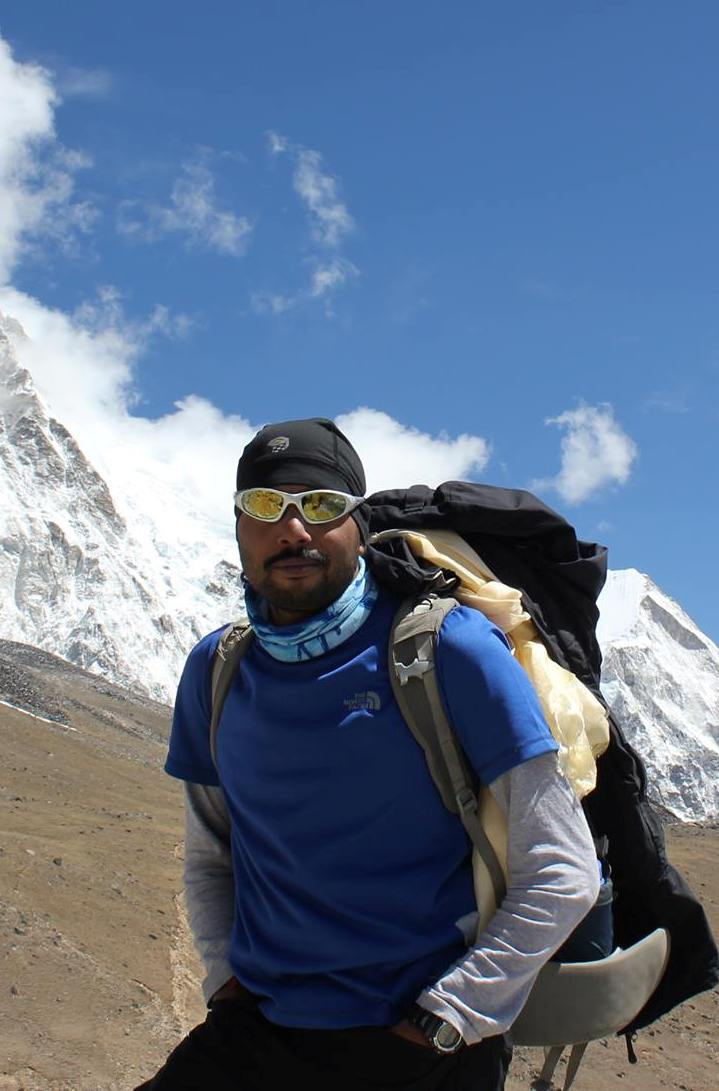
- Unnikannan in Everest Base Camp
- Born: 1983 (age 42–43); Peringome, Payyanur, Kerala State, India
- Spouse: TV.Prajisha
- Children: Adhishree

Unnikannan is the first Keralite to successfully climb Mount Everest twice. He is a native of Azhuthan Poyil Veetil from Peringome, a village near to Payyannur in Kannur district of Kerala State, India

== Mount Everest missions ==
=== 2012 Indian Army Women Everest Expedition ===
The 2012 Indian Army Women Everest Expedition led by Lt. Colonel Ajay Kothiyal recorded a total of 28 persons reach on the summit, 15 of them were Indian and 13 sherpas. Unnikannan was a member of this expedition but did not do the summit bid,

=== 2013 Indo Nepal Joint Army Everest Expedition (first ascent) ===
The 2013 Indo Nepal Joint Army Everest Expedition led by Colonel Ranveer Singh Jamwal recorded a total of 43 persons reach on the summit, 11 of them were Indian and 32 sherpas. As a member of this expedition Unnikannan climbed Mount Everest first time on 20 May 2013 with co-summiteers,

=== 2015 Indian Army Everest-Lhoste Massif Expedition ===
He was a member of the 2015 Indian Army Everest-Lhoste massive Expedition. But this expedition abandoned at 6400 m due to earthquake and avalanches happened in that year in Nepal,

=== 2016 Indian Army Everest Massif Expedition (second ascent) ===
Then in 2016 as team member of Joint Indo-Nepal Army Everest Expedition 2016 led by Colonel Ranveer Singh Jamwal he climbed Mount Everest with his team for the second time on 20 May 2016, three years to his first ascent and become the first Keralite to climb Mount Everest twice.

== Other climbed peaks ==
He joined the Himalayan Mountaineering Institute in Darjeeling for the basic mountaineering course, as a part of the Indian Army's Adventure Wing in 2005. His mountaineering career started from the time the course was completed. The first peak was Mount Kalindi near Badrinath (6,102 m) in 2006. He climbed the peaks of Satopanth (7075 m), Chaukhamba I (7138 m), Trisul I (7,120 m), and Friendship Manali, Himachal Pradesh (5,289), Chaukhamba I second time. During the conquest of Friendship peak, the group gained the honor of being the first group to climb that mountain in the winter.

Peak Name	Region	Height (in metres)	Coordinates	Range
Kalindi	Garhwal Himalaya	6,102 metres	30°55′20″N 79°16′48″E	Gangotri National Park
Satopanth	Garhwal Himalaya	7,075 metres	30°50′42″N 79°12′45″E	Gangotri National Park
Chaukhamba I	Garhwal Himalaya	7,138 metres	30°44′59″N 79°17′28″E	Gangotri National Park
Trisul I	Garhwal Himalaya	7,120 metres	30°18′41.69″N 79°46′35.91″E	Nanda Devi
Friendship Peak	Manali, Himachal Pradesh	5,289 metres	32°23′45.75″N 77°05′39.18″E	Manali, Himachal Pradesh

== Personal life ==
He is a Naib Subedar in Indian Army. His primary education was at Peringome Higher Secondary School. Unnikannan is son K K.Padmanabhan, a farmer, and Shakunthala A. P. Veetil couple. TV. Prajisha is his wife and the couple have a daughter, Adhishree.

== Notes about other Keralites on Mount Everest ==
- C. Balakrishnan did not do the summit who was the member of the first Indian successful Everest Expedition.
- Suresh Kumar (mountaineer) a member of 1992 Indo-Tibetan Border Police Expedition to Mount Everest and 1996 Indo-Tibetan Border Police expedition to Mount Everest also did not do the summit.

== See also ==
- Indian summiters of Mount Everest - Year wise
- List of Mount Everest summiters by number of times to the summit
- List of Mount Everest records of India
- List of Mount Everest records
