= Raghav Joneja =

Indian mountain climber

- Born: 21 October 1997 (age 28)
- Known for: Second-youngest Indian to climb Mount Everest (at the age of 15 years 7 months)

Raghav Joneja (born 21 October 1997) is the second-youngest Indian to climb Mount Everest on 21 May 2013 at the age of 15 years and 7 months. He was part of an expedition by the students of The Lawrence School, Sanawar which was the youngest team in the world to climb the mountain. Lawrence became the first school in the world to send a team to the highest peak.

The expedition consisted of seven boys with their sherpas, three fathers as a support team, and another four old Sanawarians, who joined the group from here to the base camp for 21 days to give them moral support. Col. Neeraj Rana, ex-director of Himalayan Mountaineering Institute (HMI), was the mentor for the expedition which 9 April arrived at Lukla, Nepal from where the group trekked for nine days to the base camp. At the base camp, they acclimatised for nearly a month and began the final ascent on 17 May.

== See also ==
- Indian summiters of Mount Everest - Year wise
- List of Mount Everest summiters by number of times to the summit
- List of Mount Everest records of India
- List of Mount Everest records
