= Tapi Mra =

Indian mountaineer

Tapi Mra is an Indian climber and the first person from Arunachal Pradesh to scale Everest. Mra belongs to the Tagin tribe from the Upper Subansiri district of the state.

Mountains climbed by Tapi Mra include:

- Island Peak or Imja Tse, (6160 m), Nepal – 24 April 2007.
- Mera Peak (6654 m), Nepal – 20 Jun 2008.
- Mount Everest (8848 m) – 21 May 2009.
- Uhuru Peak of Mount Kilimanjaro (5895 m) – 19 February 2010.
- Mount Kosciuszko (2228 m), Australia – 31 May 2011.

Mra went missing with his porter, Niku Dao, on 17 August 2022 while on an expedition to yet unconquered Mount Kyarisatam in Arunachal Pradesh; their belongings were found several weeks later.

== See also ==
- Indian summiters of Mount Everest - Year wise
- List of Mount Everest summiters by number of times to the summit
- List of Mount Everest records of India
- List of Mount Everest records
