= Shipra Mazumdar =

Indian Army officer and mountaineer

- Occupation: Major in the Indian Army
- Known for: Reaching the summit of Mount Everest

Shipra Mazumdar is a Major in the Indian Army, and a member of the Indian Army women mountaineering team. She is a Bengali. She pursued Engineering at Army Institute of Technology, Pune. She did her Basic and Advance Mountaineering Courses from Nehru Institute of Mountaineering, Uttarkashi.

== Mountaineering expedition ==
At 9:30 a.m. on 2 June 2005, she reached the summit of Mount Everest with three other members of the team. They climbed from Tibet, using the North Col route.

Another mountaineering team from the Indian Air Force had reached the summit on 30 May. One member of that team, Squadron Leader S.S. Chaithanya, disappeared in a blizzard during the descent.

== See also ==
- Indian summiters of Mount Everest - Year wise
- List of Mount Everest summiters by number of times to the summit
- List of Mount Everest records of India
- List of Mount Everest records
