= Neeraj Choudhary =

Indian Mountaineer and polar explorer

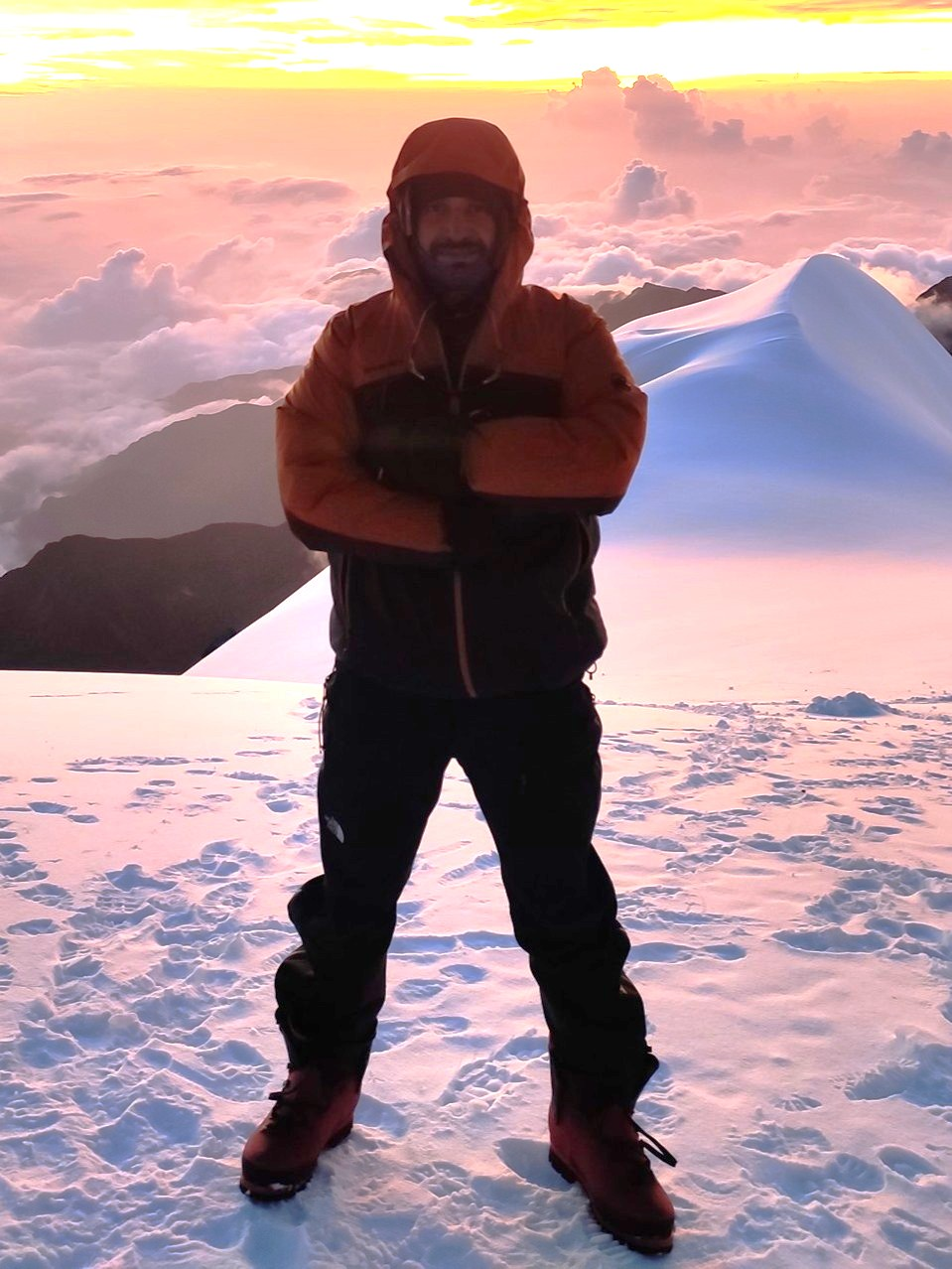
- Neeraj in September 2019

Personal information
- Nickname: Chechu
- Nationality: Indian
- Born: 11 July 1984 (age 42) Abhaypura (अभयपुरा), Sikar, India
- Education: B.E., M.B.M. University; M.Tech., IIT Delhi
- Occupations: Environmental Engineer, Coal India Limited (past); Executive Engineer, Water Resource Department, Rajasthan (recent)

Climbing career
- Type of climber: Expedition climbing
- Major ascents: Ascent of Mount Everest on the first attempt, and Skiing across Greenland ice sheet

Neeraj Choudhary (born 11 July 1984) is an Indian mountaineer, entrepreneur and polar explorer from the northwestern state of Rajasthan, India.

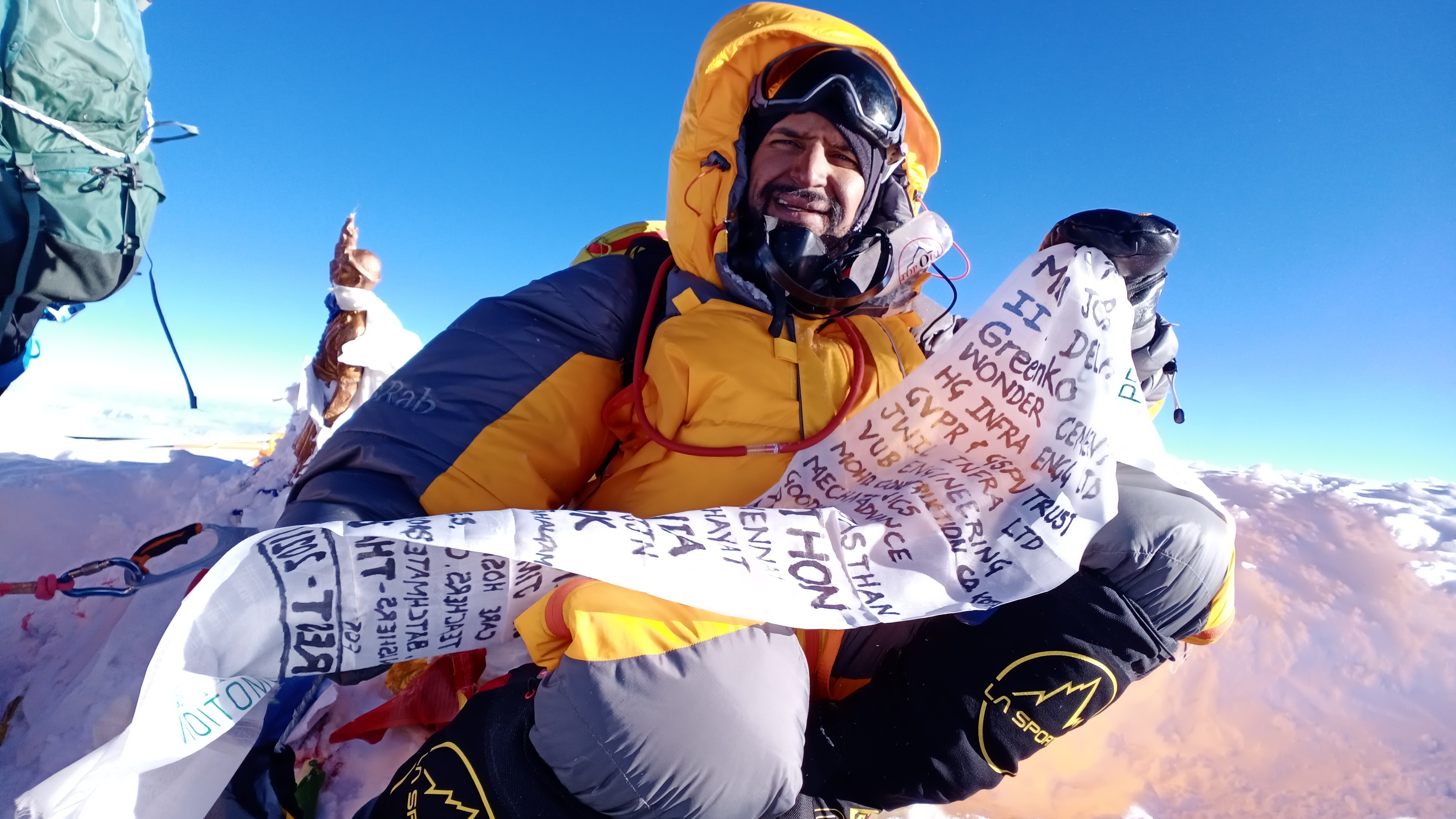
At the summit of Mount Everest, during a short stay before returning.

== Early life, education and employment ==
Neeraj was born in Abhaipura, Sikar District, Rajasthan. He pursued his Bachelor of Engineering (Honors) in civil engineering from MBM University, Jodhpur and later earned a Master of Technology (M.Tech.) degree in Environmental Engineering and Management from IIT Delhi in 2011.

Since the schooldays, Neeraj was inclined to martial arts, cycling, marathon running, and later he developed a passion for climbing. He continued to train for climbing during his college years and beyond - resulting in Mt. Kilimanjaro summit in Africa, and many other 6000m and 7000m summits in India - before making an attempt for the Mount Everest in the summer of 2021.

Neeraj has worked in multiple roles and capacities for a living alongside his professional training and expeditions. Before 2016, he had worked for Coal India Limited as environmental engineer, and currently works for state Water Resource department in Rajasthan in capacity of flood cell in-charge. In addition, he briefly served as an instructor at a local engineering college at Jaipur before departing to continue his pursuit of mountaineering aspirations.

== Mountaineering and polar expeditions ==
A skilled mountaineer and polar explorer, Choudhary has the following list of achievements.

=== Mount Everest (8,848.86 m) ===
Neeraj successfully summited the world's highest peak on 31 May 2021 as part of an expedition organized by the Indian Mountaineering Foundation (IMF), under the aegis of Ministry of Youth Affairs and Sports, Govt of India, shortly after recovering from COVID-19.

=== Horizontal Skiing across Greenland (Unassisted) ===
In May 2024, Neeraj finished the almost 600 km ski cross from Kangerlussuaq (West Coast) to Isortoq (East Coast) in 29 days. This achievement represents one of the first successful crossings by an Indian and the one from Rajasthan.

=== Central Norway Trip (Unassisted) ===
Neeraj completed a trip to mountain plateau of Hardangervidda, Norway, in the spring of 2026 to train for an expedition of south pole later that year.

== Awards and recognition ==
Neeraj's contributions have been recognized by various bodies within India. Following his Everest summit, he was honored by the Director of his alma mater Indian Institute of Technology Delhi and post-recovery achievements in the same year. The popular news media outlet Rajasthan Patrika included him in the best 40 under 40 years age Power List in the Sports category. In January 2025, the Election Commission of India appointed him the State Election Icon in his home state for voter awareness campaigns among the people.

== Photo gallery ==
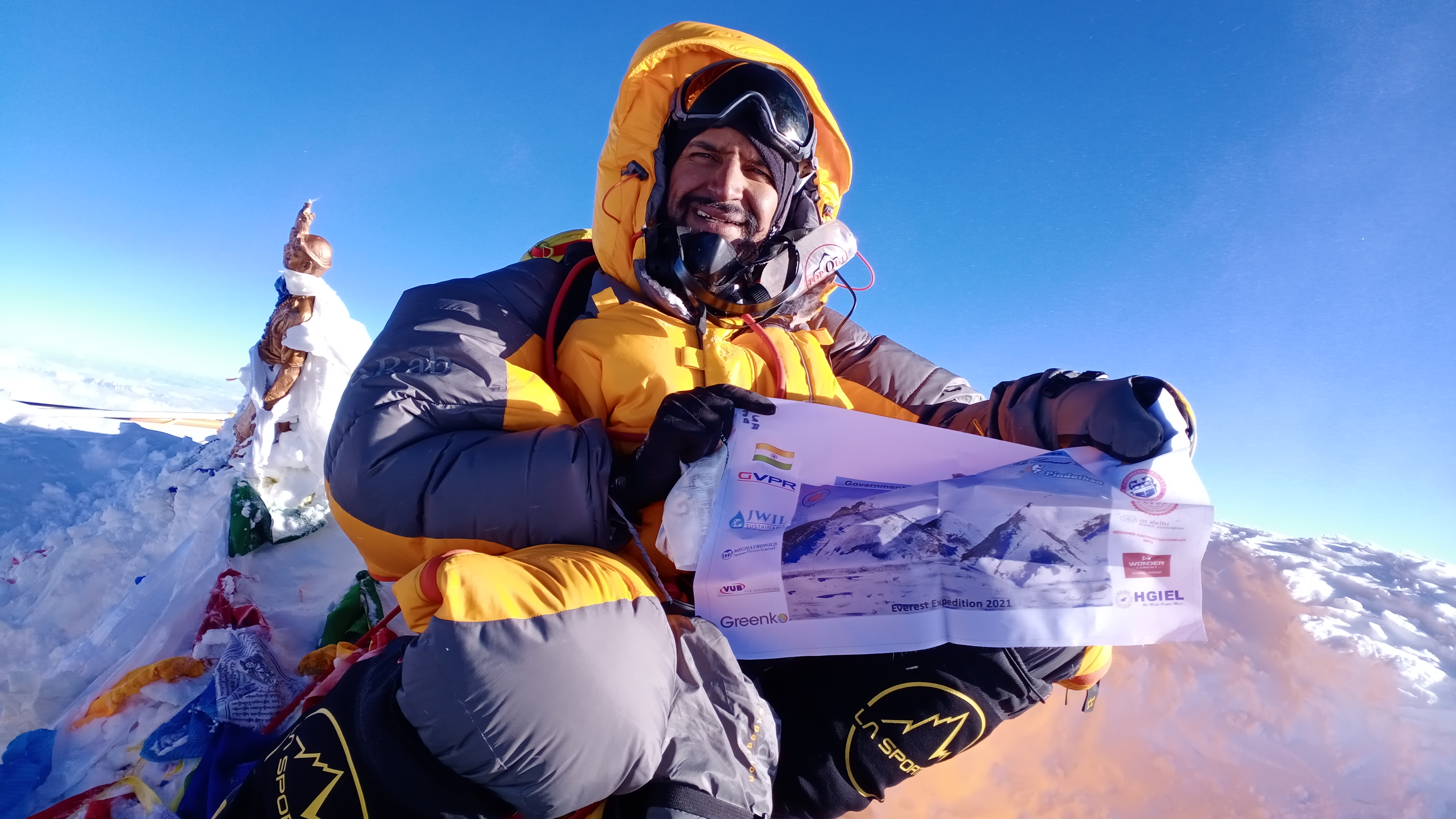
Sagarmatha View - Neeraj Choudhary during Everest Summit Expedition 2021

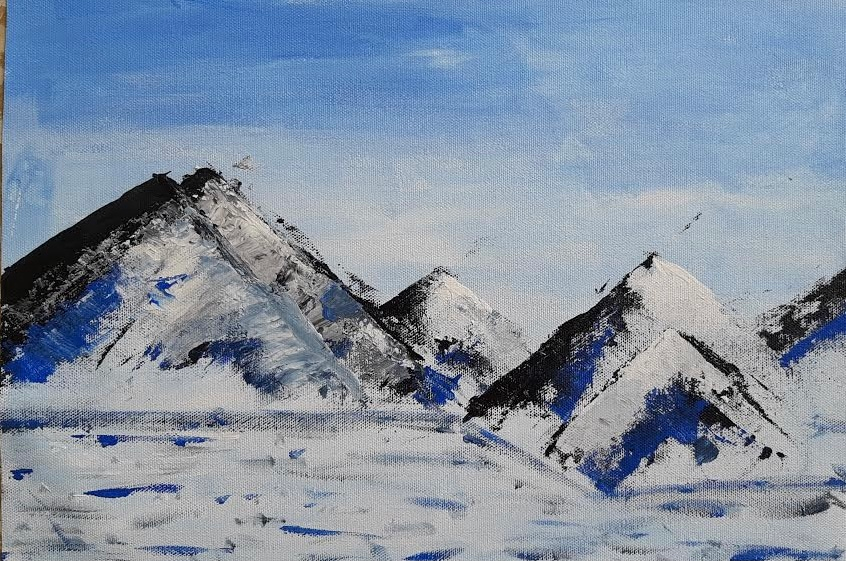
Canvas painting for the summit dream banner - contribution from a kid.

Mount Everest (2021)

== See also ==
List of Indian summiteers of Mount Everest
