= Satish Chander Sharma =

Indian Army officer and mountaineer

Satish Chander Sharma SC, VSM
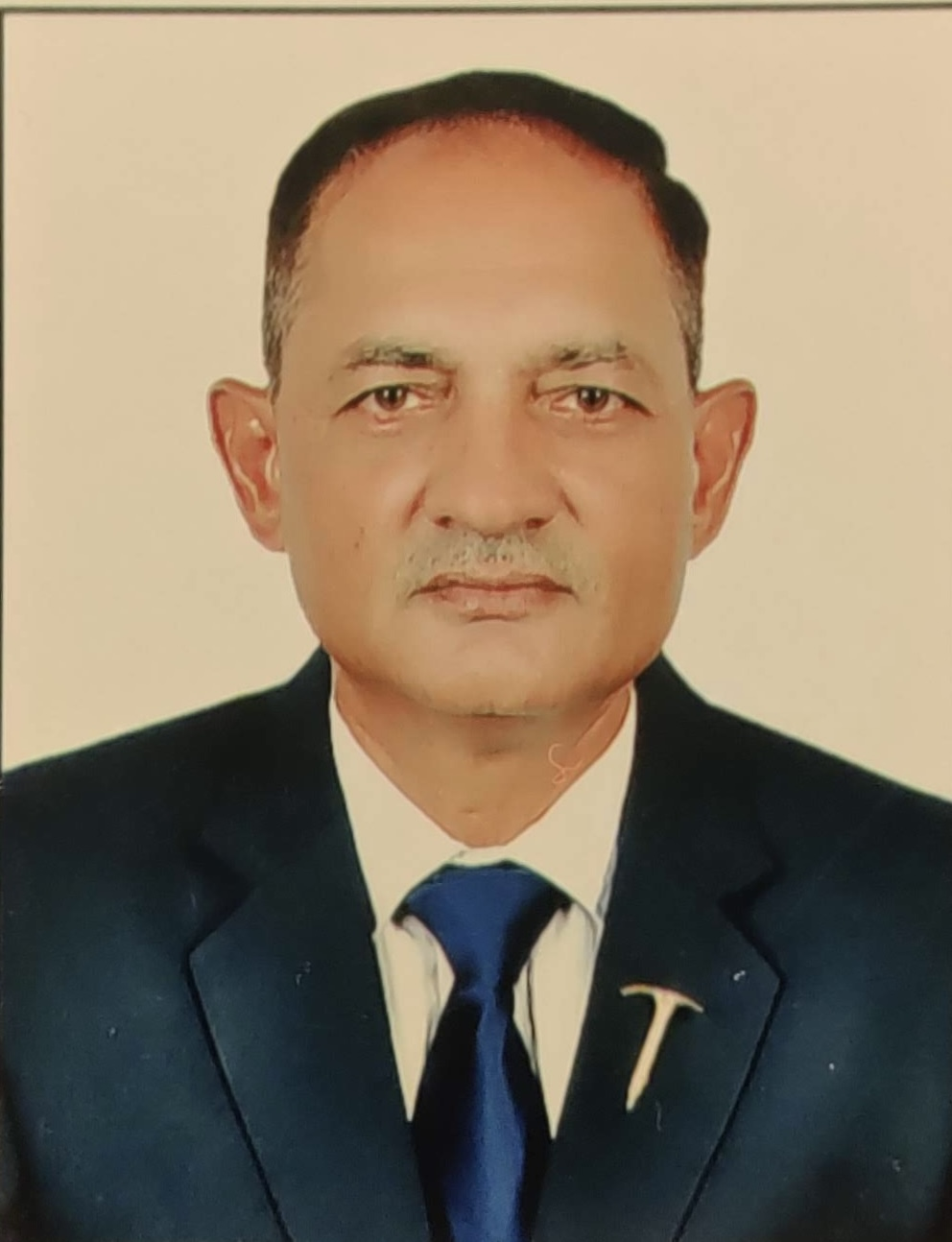
- Satish Chander Sharma in 2017
- Military career
- Allegiance: India
- Branch: Indian Army
- Rank: Colonel
- Unit: Dogra Regiment
- Awards: Shaurya Chakra; Vishisht Seva Medal; Tenzing Norgay National Adventure Award

Satish Chander Sharma, SC, VSM, is a retired Indian Army officer and mountaineer. He served with the Dogra Regiment and received the Shaurya Chakra and the Vishisht Seva Medal. He received the Tenzing Norgay National Adventure Award for lifetime achievement for the year 2014. Sharma has led Indian Army and National Cadet Corps mountaineering expeditions. Independent news and mountaineering sources have recorded his role in climbing expeditions to Kangchenjunga, Mount Everest, Kamet and the Jogin massif.

== Military career ==
Official records identify Sharma as a lieutenant colonel in the Dogra Regiment when he received the Shaurya Chakra in 2002. The Gazette of India listed Lieutenant Colonel Satish Chander Sharma, SC, Dogra, among the recipients of the Vishisht Seva Medal in 2004. By 2015, official records of the National Sports and Adventure Awards identified him as Colonel Satish Chander Sharma (Retd.).

== Mountaineering ==
In 1997, a Tri-Services expedition organised by the Indian Army under Lieutenant Colonel S. C. Sharma climbed all three summits of the Jogin massif in the Kedar Ganga valley. The expedition was later recorded by mountaineer Ashok Abbey in The Himalayan Journal.

In 2001, Nepali Times reported that a 12-member Indian Army expedition led by Col. S. C. Sharma had been permitted to attempt Mount Everest during the spring climbing season in Nepal.

In 2002, Sharma led the Indian Army expedition to Annapurna I. The Press Information Bureau reported that four Indian Army climbers and three Sherpas reached the summit on 6 May 2002, and that the Chief of the Army Staff commended Sharma and the team after the climb. Sharma also wrote an expedition account for The Himalayan Journal.

In 2004, Sharma led an Indian Army expedition to Kangchenjunga. The Times of India reported that the expedition, led by Lieutenant Colonel S. C. Sharma, reached the summit on 10 October 2004 from the southwest face of the mountain. The Telegraph also reported the successful ascent by the Army team. The Ministry of Defence recorded the expedition in its 2004–05 annual report and stated that six climbers reached the summit on 10 October 2004.

In 2012, Sharma led the National Cadet Corps pre-Everest expedition to Kamet. The Press Information Bureau reported that the expedition was part of the preparation for the NCC Everest expedition planned for 2013 and included Sharma as team leader.

In 2013, Sharma led the first NCC expedition to Mount Everest. The New Indian Express reported that the expedition team was led by Col. S. C. Sharma and had trained at the Himalayan Mountaineering Institute in Darjeeling before undertaking pre-Everest expeditions to Deo Tibba and Kamet. Business Standard reported that the NCC expedition scaled Everest in two groups on 19 and 20 May 2013. The Times of India also reported the NCC Everest ascent and identified Sharma as the team leader.

=== Tiranga Mountain Rescue ===
After retiring from the Indian Army, Sharma became associated with Tiranga Mountain Rescue Foundation. In 2024, SSBCRACK reported that a Tiranga Mountain Rescue delegation that met Chief of Defence Staff General Anil Chauhan was led by founder Hemant Sachdev and Director Col. S. C. Sharma.

Tiranga Mountain Rescue is a non-profit organisation affiliated with the Indian Army since 2016. The Ministry of Defence has described its work as avalanche rescue support and mountain-craft training for Indian Army personnel in snow-bound and high-altitude areas.

== Awards and honours ==
- Shaurya Chakra
- Vishisht Seva Medal
- Tenzing Norgay National Adventure Award, lifetime achievement, 2014

The Tenzing Norgay National Adventure Award is conferred by the Ministry of Youth Affairs and Sports for adventure achievements in land, water, air and lifetime achievement categories. The Ministry states that the award has the same status as the Arjuna Award.
