= Anshu Jamsenpa =

Indian mountaineer

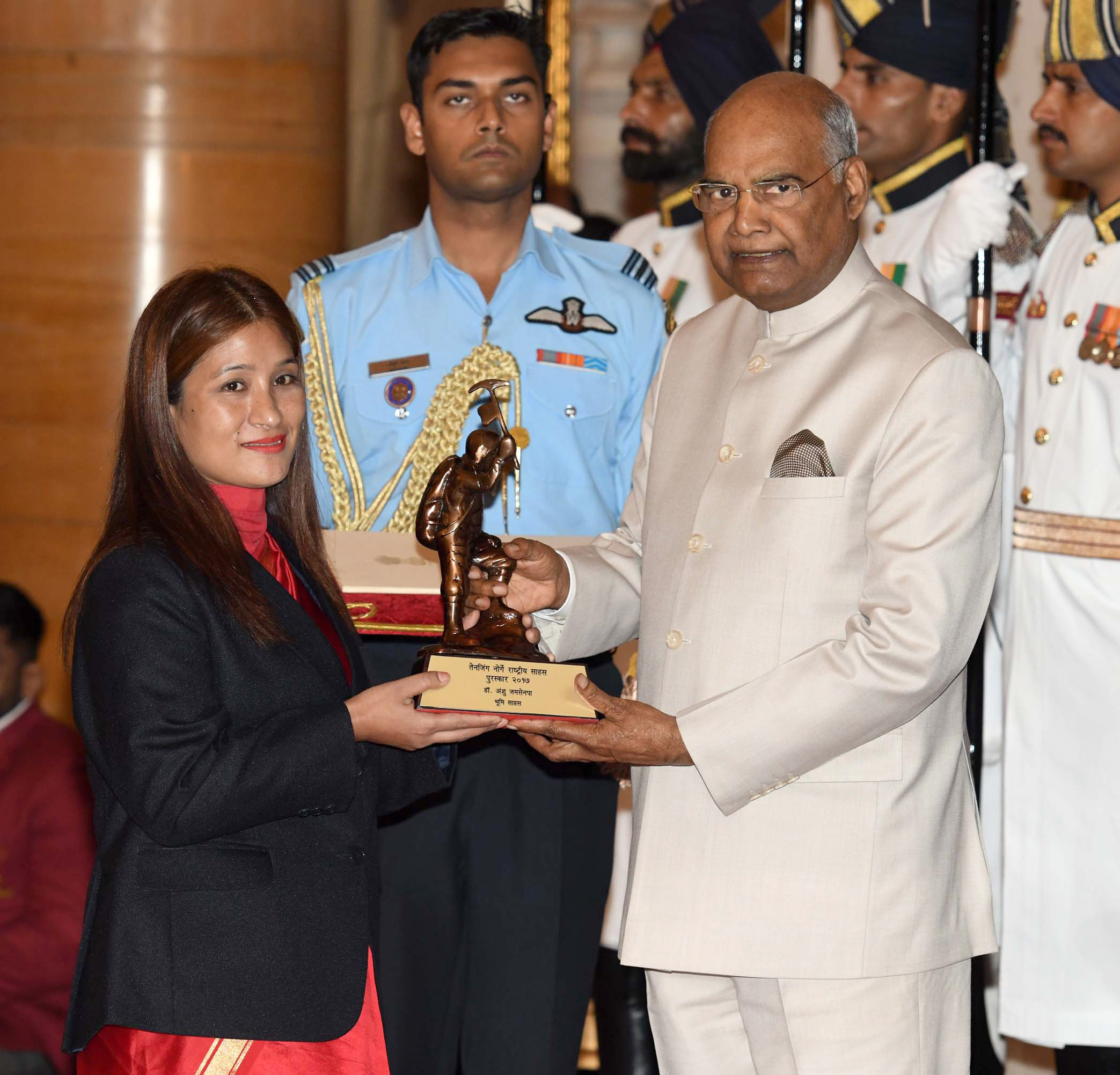
- President, Shri Ram Nath Kovind presenting the Tenzing Norgay National Adventure Award, 2017 to Jamsenpa

Personal information
- Nationality: India
- Born: 31 December 1979 (age 46) Bomdila, West Kameng district, Arunachal Pradesh, India
- Occupations: Mountaineer and Promoter for Adventure
- Spouse: Tsering Wange
- Children: 2
- Website: www.%20anshujamsenpa.com

Climbing career
- Major ascents: The first Indian woman to reach the summit of Mount Everest 5 times

Anshu Jamsenpa is an Indian mountaineer and the first woman in the world to scale the summit of Mount Everest twice in a season, and the fastest double summiter to do so within five days. It is also the fastest double ascent of the tallest crest by a woman. She is from Bomdila, headquarters of West Kameng district, Arunachal Pradesh - the state that holds the most north-eastern position in India. She was awarded India's fourth-highest civilian award the Padma Shri in 2021.

== Career ==
Jamsenpa summited Mount Everest in 2011 first time on 12 May and she made a second summit on 21 May.

She summited Mount Everest in 2013 in the 2013 North East India Everest Expedition led by Surjit Singh Leishangthem.

In 2017, Jamsenpa became the first woman in the world to scale the summit of Mount Everest twice in a season and the first to do so within 5 days. It is the fastest double ascent of the tallest crest by a woman. This was her fifth summit and thus she became the most time climbed Indian woman.

After taking the blessings of 14th Dalai Lama she began her Everest climbing expedition from Guwahati on 2 April 2017. She took 38 days schedule for acclimatization at the Everest Base Camp (at 17,600 ft.) and started her main journey on 4 April. At 9.15 am on 16 May along with 17 other climbers, she climbed up to the mountaintop and unfurled the Indian National Flag.

She started her second arduous trek with Nepali climber Furi Sherpa on 19 May. She continued climbing almost without any pause in hiking, till 10 pm. Again the next morning, she began climbing and took a brief break prior to the summit hike, and finally reached the apex at 7.45 am, on 21 May 2017. Although the feather of double ascent had been already added to her cap in 2017, she climbed the peak twice (second and third expedition) within 10 days. However, this year, she took 118 hours and 15 minutes to finish her 5th mission after 4th one.

== Honors and awards ==
For making history (the first woman and also the first mother who completed twice double ascents), the first Indian woman to scale Mt. Everest five times. The Government of Arunachal Pradesh has suggested her name for the Tenzing Norgay National Adventure Award. The President, Ram Nath Kovind presented the Tenzing Norgay National Adventure Award 2017, India's Highest Adventure Award to Jamsenpa for Adventure at Rashtrapati Bhavan, in New Delhi on 25 September 2018.

Jamsenpa was conferred the CNN-IBN Young Indian Leader Award in New Delhi on 30 June 2011. She received the award from Jyotiraditya Scindia, Ministry of Commerce and Industry (India).

On 2 June 2012, Jamsenpa was awarded Woman Achiever of the Year 2011–12 by the Federation of Indian Chambers of Commerce & Industry (FICCI) in Guwahati.

On 31 January 2017 she was conferred with the Tourism Icon of the Year Award by Government of Arunachal Pradesh in a function held at I G Park Itanagar which was attended by the Governor Padmanabha Acharya as Chief Guest.

Jamsenpa was conferred Ph.D. by the Arunachal University of Studies for her achievements in the field of adventure sports and for making the region proud

== Personal life ==
Her husband, Tsering Wange, is the president of the Arunachal Mountaineering and Adventure Sports Association. She has two daughters.

== See also ==
- Indian summiters of Mount Everest - Year wise
- List of Mount Everest records of India
- List of Mount Everest records
- List of Mount Everest summiters by number of times to the summit
