= Krushnaa Patil =

Indian mountaineer

- Born: 30 October 1989 (age 36); Pune, Maharashtra, India
- Other names: Ashwini
- Occupations: mountaineer, motivational speaker
- Known for: Second youngest Indian to summit Mt. Everest in 2009
- Awards: Rajiv Gandhi Puraskar, 2009 Kesari Lokmanya Tilak Felicitation, 2009 Hirkani Puraskar, 2009 Young Achiever, Citadel Award 2009 Young Achiever, Mitcom Award 2009 Zhansi Ki Rani Award 2009 Indira Gandhi Puraskar, 2009 Maharashtra Ratna – 2010 Rotary International Award, 2010 Gr8 Women’s Awards, 2010 Young Indian Leaders, CNN-IBN, 2010 Today’s Youth Asia Award (Nepal), 2010
- Website: https://krushnaapatil.in

Krushnaa Patil is an Indian mountaineer. In 2009, at the age of 19, she became the youngest Indian woman to successfully climb Mount Everest, earth's highest mountain.

Her record of the youngest Indian to climb Everest has subsequently been surpassed by younger climbers. In 2010, Patil attempted to ascent the Seven Summits. Her last summit on Denali had to be abandoned due to technical reasons, leaving her one short of completing the feat.

== Mountaineering ==
For Krushnaa Patil's family, vacations were always in the Himalayas. She enrolled in the Nehru Institute of Mountaineering (NIM) at Uttarkashi for a Basic Mountaineering Course in 2007 followed by an Advance Mountaineering Course in 2008.

Soon after, Patil got the chance to be a part of the pre-Everest expedition, and at 18, became the youngest person to scale Mount Satopanth in Garhwal Himalayas, Uttarakhand. Everest followed in May 2009, when she became the second youngest Indian (after Dicky Dolma) to summit the peak.

Patil reached the summit of Mount Everest and became the youngest person to scale Everest in 2009. In the same year, she summited Mount Vinson Massif in Antarctica.

In 2010, she summited Aconcagua followed by Mount Elbrus, the highest peak in Europe.

== After mountaineering ==
Krushnaa was a part of an international expedition on clean water access and conservation program, which, through 2014 - 2020, promoted access to fresh water around the world with a team of eight women, from six continents.

As of 2018, Krushnaa is a chef at a restaurant in Srinagar.

== See also ==
- Indian summiters of Mount Everest - Year wise
- List of Mount Everest summiters by number of times to the summit
- List of Mount Everest records of India
- List of Mount Everest records
