= Reena Bhatti =

Indian mountaineer

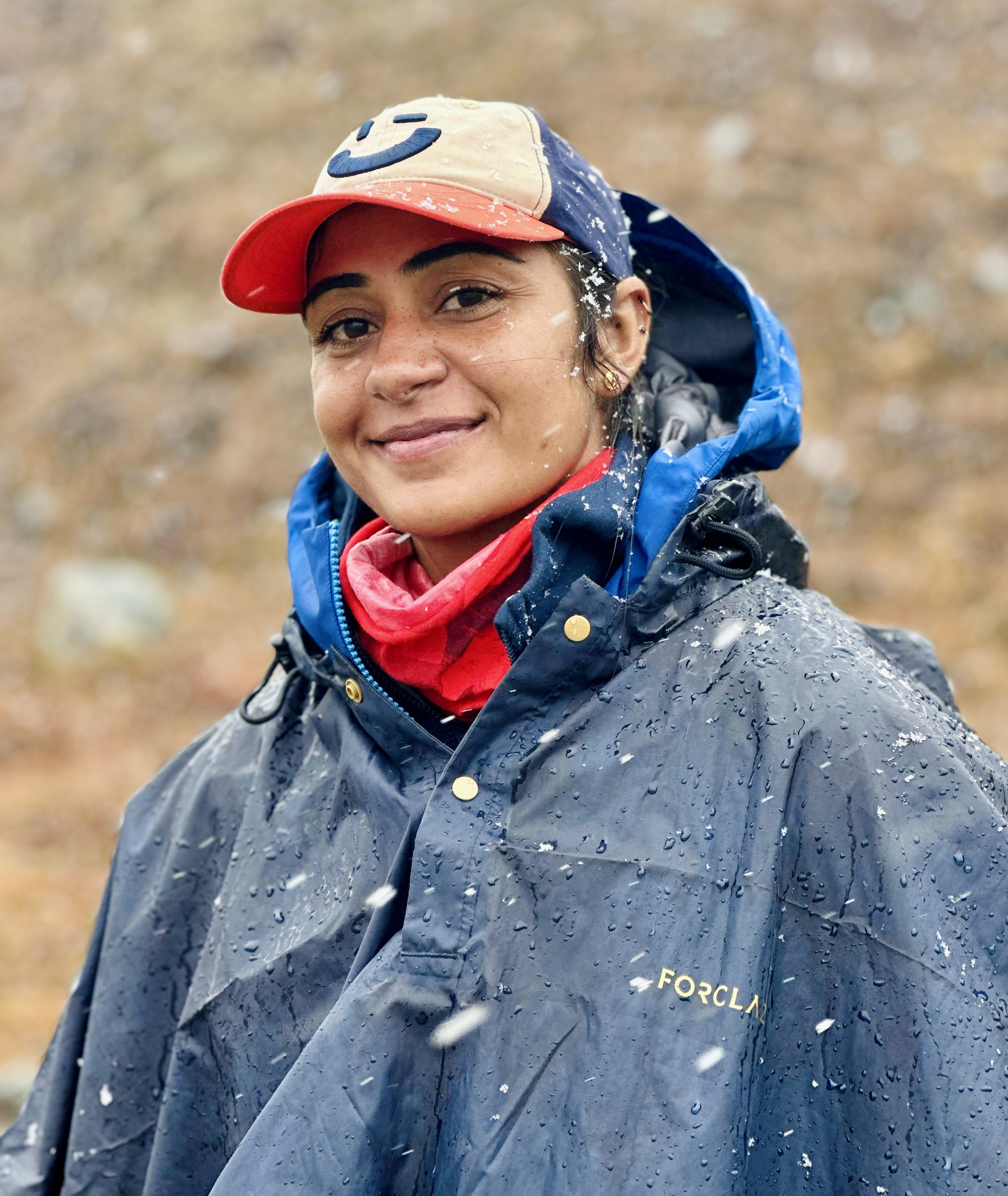

Personal information
- Nationality: Indian
- Born: 1989 (age 36–37) Hisar district, Haryana, India

Climbing career
- Major ascents: fastest Indian woman to climb Mount Everest and Mount Lhotse

Reena Bhatti, also known as Himputri, is an Indian mountaineer from Haryana, India. She is known for summiting multiple high-altitude peaks, including Mount Everest and Mount Lhotse, which she reportedly climbed within a span of 20.5 hours in May 2024. Bhatti has participated in over 20 mountaineering expeditions across the Himalayas, Central Asia, and Europe since 2019.

== Early life and education ==
Bhatti was born in Balak village in Barwala tehsil of Hisar district, Haryana. Born into a modest family, Bhatti is the daughter of a tractor mechanic. She earned a Master of Computer Applications (MCA) degree in 2017 and worked in the private sector before beginning her mountaineering career.

== Career ==
Bhatti began mountaineering in 2019 and has participated in expeditions in India and internationally, climbing peaks with different altitudes and technical requirements.

=== Notable expeditions ===
- Mount Everest and Mount Lhotse (2024): In May 2024, Bhatti summited Mount Everest (8,848.86 m) and Mount Lhotse (8,516 m) within a span of 20.5 hours, reportedly becoming the fastest Indian woman to climb both peaks. This was her second attempt, following an earlier expedition in 2023 that ended short of the summit due to technical challenges.
- Mount Elbrus (2022): In August 2022, Bhatti climbed both the western (5,642 m) and eastern (5,621 m) summits of Mount Elbrus in Russia within a 24-hour period. She undertook this climb in association with the Har Ghar Tiranga campaign.
- Ama Dablam (2023): Bhatti summited Ama Dablam (6,812 m) in Nepal in 2023.
- Mount Kang Yatse and Mount Dzo Jongo (2022): In Ladakh, Bhatti climbed Mount Kang Yatse (6,270 m) and Mount Dzo Jongo (6,240 m) in a single expedition lasting approximately 70 hours.

In 2022, Bhatti participated in the "Depression Against Running" relay, described as one of the longest relay races held in India.

== Award and recognition ==
- Sir Chhotu Ram Memorial Bharat Gaurav Award (2024): Bhatti received this award in November 2024 in recognition of her achievements in mountaineering.

== Public engagement ==
In 2025, Bhatti publicly appealed to the Government of Haryana for recognition of her accomplishments, requesting employment and financial assistance similar to that extended to athletes from other sports disciplines.

In July 2025, Bhatti served as a brand ambassador for a half‑marathon held on Ambala Road, Kaithal, as part of an awareness campaign against drug abuse in Haryana. She participated in the event alongside chief minister Nayab Singh Saini and other prominent figures.
