= Kalpana Dash =

Indian mountaineer (1966–2019)

Kalpana Dash କଳ୍ପନା ଦାଶ
Personal information
- Born: July 7, 1966 Dhenkanal, India
- Died: May 23, 2019 (aged 52) Mount Everest

Climbing career
- Major ascents: Denali, Kilimanjaro, Mount Everest, Vinson Massif, Puncak Jaya, Elbrus, Damavand, Aconcagua, Ojos del Salado, Pico de Orizaba

Kalpana Dash (Odia: କଳ୍ପନା ଦାଶ; 7 July 1966 – 23 May 2019) was an Indian mountaineer who was the first Odia climber to scale Mount Everest. She scaled Mount Everest on 21 May 2008, along with a team of five members from the United States, Canada and Nepal.

Dash had attempted to climb Mount Everest twice before, once in 2004 and once in 2006, but failed due to bad weather and health conditions.

== Death ==
On 23 May 2019, Dash again summited Everest with two others, but became ill on the descent and died just above the balcony of Mount Everest.

The cause of Dash's death was the unusual congestion near the summit of Mount Everest because of a narrow climbing window made narrower by severe weather conditions and the Nepal government issuing permits to several hundred climbers during Everest famous Black Friday stunt to reach the summit at a premium. At least 11 climbers — many of them veteran mountain climbers like Dash — from Nepal, Europe, United States and India died during the 2019 climbing season in April and May 2019. Donald Cash from Utah in the United States and Anjali Kulkarni from India were among those who died in the same week as Dash.

Dash's body was recovered by Sherpas and brought to India.

By the time of her death, Dash had successfully completed the Seven Summits and five of the Volcanic Seven Summits.

== Expeditions ==
- Mount Everest - Asia's highest peak - 8,848 m successfully summited on 21 May 2008
- Denali - North America's highest peak - 6,190 m successfully summited on 15 June 2010
- Kilimanjaro- Africa's highest peak - 5,895 m successfully summited on 9 October 2014
- Aconcagua - South America's highest peak - 6,962 m successfully summited on 16 January 2015
- Mount Elbrus - Europe's highest peak - 5,642 m successfully summited on 31 July 2015
- Mount Vinson - Antarctica's highest peak 4,892 meters m successfully summited on 23 December 2015
- Carstensz Pyramid - Oceania's highest peak 4,884 m successfully summited on 12 November 2016
- Ojos del Salado - Chile's highest peak 6,893 m successfully summited on 22 December 2017
- Damavand - Iran's highest peak 5,610 m successfully summited on 20 June 2018
- Pico de Orizaba - Mexico's highest peak 5,636 m successfully summited on 10 October 2018

== See also ==
- Indian summiters of Mount Everest - Year wise
- List of Mount Everest summiters by number of times to the summit
- List of Mount Everest records of India
- List of Mount Everest records
- List of people who died climbing Mount Everest
