= Sangeeta Sindhi Bahl =

Indian mountaineer

Madam Sangeeta Sindhi Bahl
- Born: 9 February 1965 (age 61); Jammu, Jammu and Kashmir, India
- Occupation: Mountain climber
- Known for: Summiting Mount Everest (2018), oldest Indian women mountaineer to summit Mount Everest at an age of 53 years.
- Spouse: Ankur Bahl

Sangeeta Sindhi Bahl (born 9 February 1965) became the oldest Indian woman to climb the world's tallest peak (8,848.86 m or 29,031.7 ft), when she summited Mount Everest in May 2018, at the age of 53 years. She also became the first woman from the Indian union territory of Jammu and Kashmir to scale the mountain. Bahl is a former Miss India finalist.

== Mountaineering ==
Sangeeta Bahl first took up mountain climbing at the age of 46. Encouraged and trained by her husband Ankur Bahl, an already-accomplished mountaineer, she tackled Kilimanjaro (5,895 m or 19,341 ft) with him in 2011. Two years later, Bahl climbed Mount Elbrus (5,642 m or 18,510 ft), Europe's highest peak, before becoming, in 2014, the third Indian woman to climb Antarctica's Mount Vinson (4,897 m or 16,066 ft). One year later, she scaled Aconcagua (6,962 m or 22,841 ft), the highest peak of South America.

=== Mount Everest climb 2018 ===
Bahl's first attempt to climb Everest in 2017 failed due to altitude sickness. After fifty days on the mountain, symptoms of altitude sickness emerged and she had to be evacuated from a high-altitude base camp, along with six other climbers similarly affected. Bahl was struck with the illness despite having prepared by climbing two 6,000-metre-plus (20,000 ft) mountains in the lead up.

On 19 May 2018, she reached the summit of Everest at her second attempt. High winds and snowfalls added challenging conditions as Bahl made her final push to the summit, approaching from the South Col-side. She was supported in her ascent by two Sherpas as her mountain guides, whom Bahl names as Ngaa Tenji and "Nurbu Sherpa". During this second attempt, Bahl did not suffer from any symptoms of altitude sickness, which she attributes to thorough preparation and rigorous training. In attaining the summit, Bahl surpassed Premlata Agrawal's record as the oldest Indian woman to reach it, Agrawal having made the climb in 2011.

=== Seven Summits ===
Bahl has completed climbs on six of the traditional Seven Summits of the world, leaving only Denali in North America unscaled by her. In 2019, Bahl was in training to attempt a climb to the seventh summit.

Details of the completed climbs are shown in the table below:

Image	Peak	Elevation	Continent	Date of Summit
	Mount Everest	8,848 m (29,029 ft)	Asia	2018
	Aconcagua	6,961 m (22,838 ft)	South America	2015
	Kilimanjaro	5,895 m (19,341 ft)	Africa	2011
	Mount Elbrus	5,642 m (18,510 ft)	Europe	2013
	Mount Vinson	4,892 m (16,050 ft)	Antarctica	2014
	Mount Kosciuszko	2,228 m (7,310 ft)	Australia	2016

== Professional interests and personal life ==
Bahl is the founder, director and image consultant of Impact Image Consultants, a Gurgaon-based company specialising in professional image consultancy. As a trainer for corporate staff, she offers mentoring and coaching services for both individuals and organisations. She has appeared as a keynote speaker and has spread knowledge about how mountain climbing helps in building endurance, resilience, mental strength and stability during interactive sessions with the children and the celebrity show host Mrs Nidhi Kumar, conducted by Skoolz. In 1985 Bahl competed in the national beauty pageant organised and run by Femina, Miss India, in which she reached the finals.

Bahl was born in Jammu, the winter capital city of what was then the state of Jammu and Kashmir. Her husband is Ankur Bahl and they have one son.

== See also ==
- List of Indian summiteers of Mount Everest
- List of Mount Everest summiteers by frequency
- List of Mount Everest records of India
- List of Mount Everest records
- Tamae Watanabe – Japanese mountain climber and record holder as oldest woman to scale Everest
