= Premlata Agrawal =

Indian mountaineer

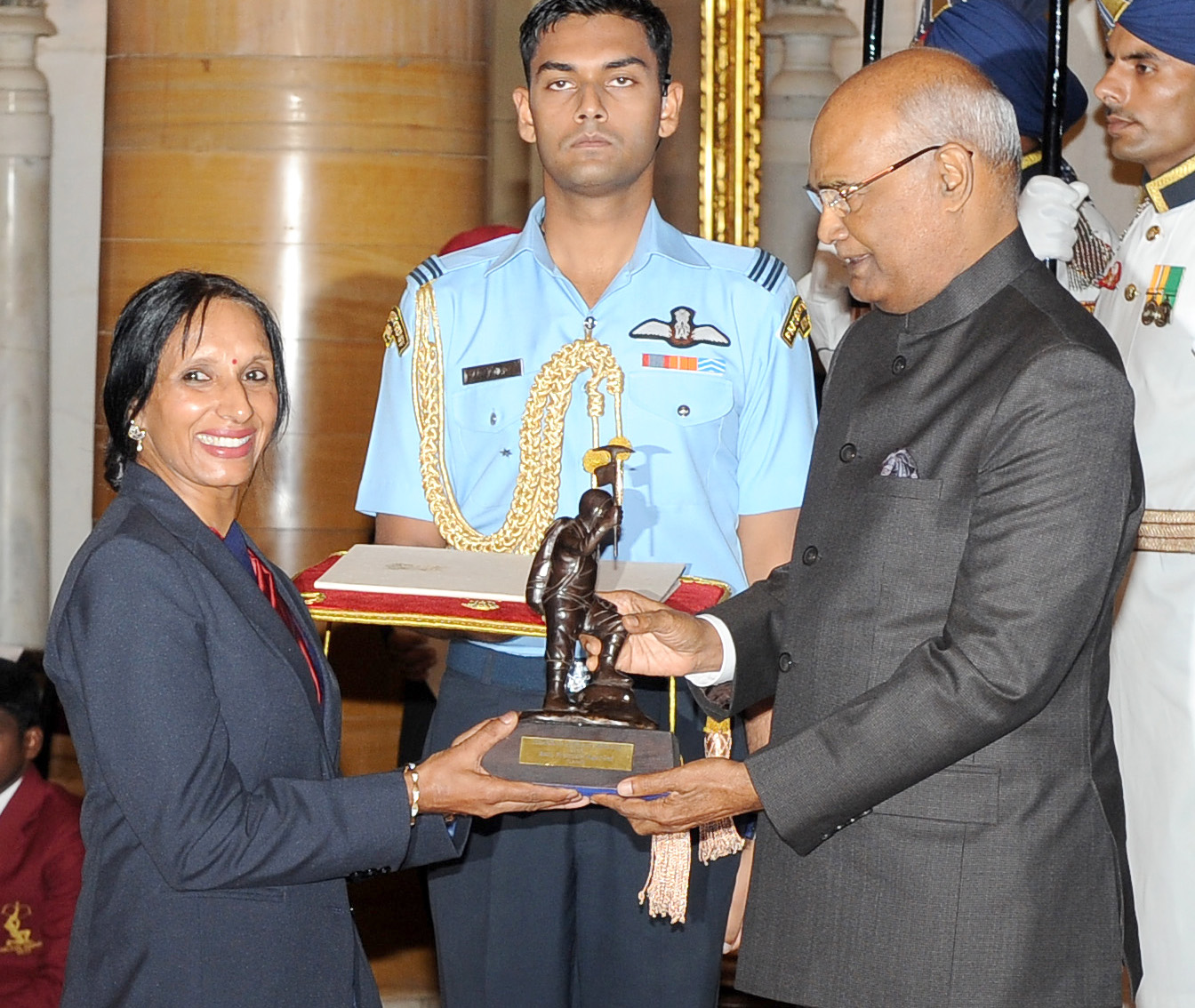
- The President, Shri Ram Nath Kovind presenting the Tenzing Norgay National Adventure Award, 2017 to Smt. Premlata Agrawal
- Born: Premlata Garg; 1963 (age 62–63); Darjeeling, West Bengal, India
- Occupation: Mountain climber
- Known for: Summiting Mount Everest (2011)The first Indian woman - mountaineer to complete the seven summits and the oldest Indian women mountaineer to summit Mount Everest at an age of 48 years
- Spouse: Vimal Agarwal

Premlata Agrawal (born 1963) is the first Indian woman to scale the Seven Summits, the seven highest continental peaks of the world. She was awarded the Padma Shri by the Government of India in 2013 and Tenzing Norgay National Adventure Award in 2017 for her achievements in the field of mountaineering. On 17 May 2011, she became the oldest Indian woman to have scaled the world's tallest peak, Mount Everest (29,032 ft.); at the age of 48 years at that time while Sangeeta Sindhi Bahl hailing from Jammu and Kashmir broke Premlata's record on 19 May 2018 and became the oldest Indian woman to climb Mount Everest at the age of 53.

Prior to this, she took part in an Island Peak Expedition in Nepal (20,600 ft) in 2004; the Karakoram Pass (18,300 ft) and Mt. Saltoro Kangri (20,150 ft) in 2006. She participated in the First Indian Women's Thar Desert Expedition in 2007 and again in 2015; a 40-day camel safari from Bhuj in Gujarat to the Wagah Border (Indo-Pak border) in Punjab. Her feats have earned her a listing in the Limca Book of Records.

== Career ==
She started mountaineering at the age of 36, after taking part in a hill climbing competition in Jamshedpur. Soon she discovered her passion for climbing. Subsequently, she was trained and mentored by Bachendri Pal, the first Indian woman to climb Mount Everest in 1984.

== Mount Everest climb 2011 ==
She was part of a 22-member eco-Everest expedition team, the Indian contingent also included Sunita Singh, Narendar Singh, Pawan Grewal, Sushma and Vikas Kaushik, besides climbers Rodrigo Raineri of Brazil and David Liano of Mexico. She spent over a month climbing around Everest Base Camps to acclimatise, and also did a climbing exercise at 20,300-feet-high Island Peak in the Himalayas. She started the main climb on 6 May when climbed from the Everest base camp at 18,000 feet to Camp 2 at 22,000 feet. However, then on she used supplemental oxygen, and reached Camp 3 at 23,000 feet and Camp 4 at 26,000 feet. The multinational trekking team led by Dawa Steven Sherpa took an overnight trek to climb the summit. They started at 11pm from the South Col (Camp 4 at 26,000 ft) route from the Nepal side and touched the summit at 9.35am on 20 May 2011, which is a height of 29,032 ft. An hour before reaching the summit she lost one of her gloves, and decided to turn back as it was not possible to climb such height without a glove, just then she saw a pair of gloves lying on the snow, left by someone.

== Seven Summits climbing details ==
No.	Image	peak	Elevation	Continent	Date of Summit
1		Mount Everest	8,848 m (29,029 ft)	Asia	20 May 2011
2		Aconcagua	6,961 m (22,838 ft)	South America	10 February 2012
3		Denali	6,194 m (20,322 ft)	North America	23 May 2013
4		Kilimanjaro	5,895 m (19,341 ft)	Africa	6 June 2008
5		Mount Elbrus	5,642 m (18,510 ft)	Europe	12 August 2012
6		Mount Vinson	4,892 m (16,050 ft)	Antarctica	5 January 2013
7		Puncak Jaya	4,884 m (16,024 ft)	Australia	22 October 2013

== Personal life ==
She is married and has two daughters.

== Press coverage ==
Premlata Agarwal was named top Indian women achievers in 2012 by indiatimes.com.

In 2016, she was featured in a video saluting iron strong women of India by Tata Salt.

== See also ==
- Indian summiters of Mount Everest - Year wise
- List of Mount Everest summiters by number of times to the summit
- List of Mount Everest records of India
- List of Mount Everest records
