= Draupadi Ka Danda =

Garhwal Himalaya peak

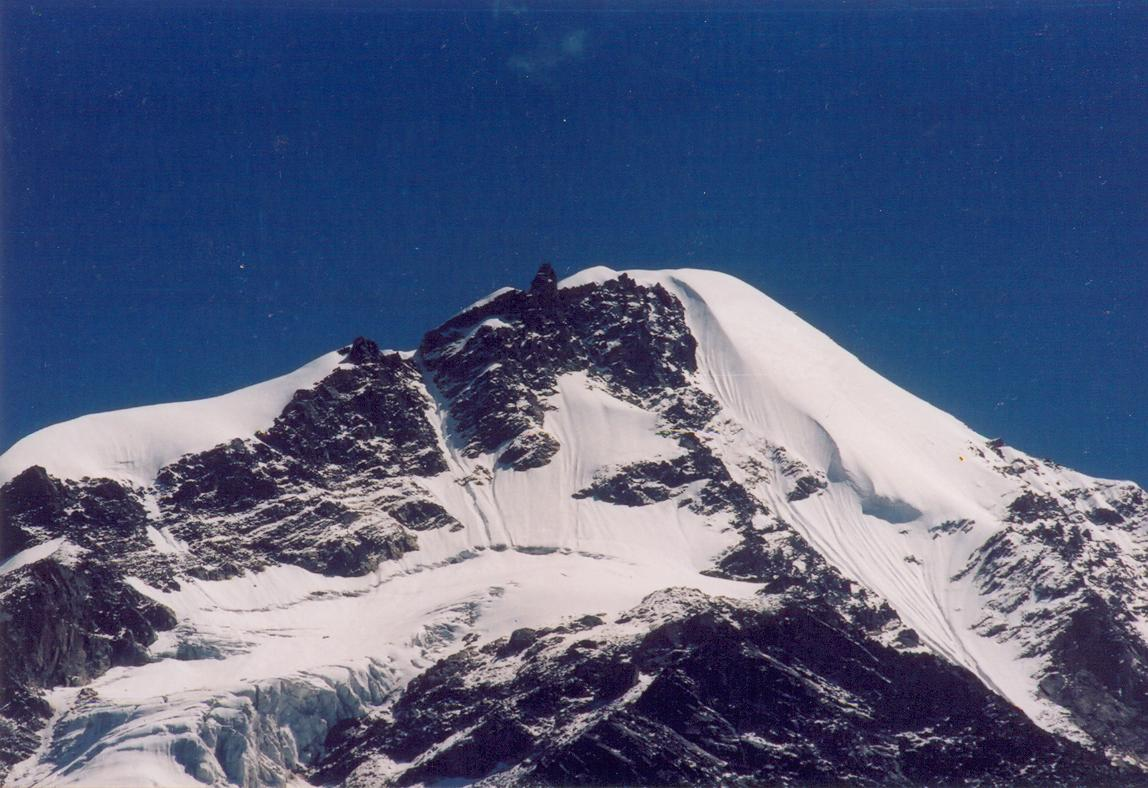
- The summit of Draupadi Ka Danda II

Highest point
- Elevation: 5,670 m (18,600 ft)
- Listing: List of mountain peaks of Uttarakhand
- Coordinates: 30°50′06″N 78°48′32″E

Geography
- Location within Uttarakhand Location within India
- Parent range: Garhwal Himalaya

Draupadi Ka Danda (English: Draupadi's Hill) are two peaks in the Gangotri range of Garhwal Himalaya in Uttarakhand, India. The Dokriani glacier emerges from the northern slope of the mountain.

The heights of the peaks are uncertain. In various literature, elevation has been reported as 5,670 metres, 5716m or sometimes above 6000m.

On the morning of 4 October 2022, a team of 41 climbers from Nehru Institute of Mountaineering attempting Draupadi Ka Danda II were hit by an avalanche a few hundred meters below the summit. The team comprised 34 advance mountaineering course trainees and seven instructors. The bodies of 27 climbers were recovered during rescue operations, but two mountaineers could not be found.

== Etymology ==
The name Draupadi Ka Danda is derived from the combination of two words, Draupadi (A character of Mahabharata Epic) and danda meaning "peak".

== Legends ==
According to folklore, the Pandavas and their wife Draupadi, the central figures of the Hindu epic, Mahabharata had traversed through the area, also known as Devbhumi, (God's own land) on their way to heaven. Just before being carried into the higher regions, Draupadi had planted her staff (similar to modern-day hiking sticks) into the ground. The mountain is believed to exist where the staff once stood.

== See also ==
- Geography of Uttarakhand
- Geology of the Himalaya
- List of Himalayan peaks of Uttarakhand
