= Tom Hornbein =

American mountaineer (1930–2023)

- Born: November 6, 1930; St. Louis, Missouri, U.S.
- Died: May 6, 2023 (aged 92); Estes Park, Colorado, U.S.
- Known for: Pioneering West Ridge ascent of Mount Everest
- Spouse: Kathryn Mikesell (m. 1971)

Academic background
- Education: University of Colorado Boulder (BA); Washington University School of Medicine (MD)

Academic work
- Discipline: Climber; physician; professor
- Sub-discipline: Mountaineering; anesthesiology; geology

Thomas Frederic Hornbein (November 6, 1930 – May 6, 2023) was an American mountaineer and anesthesiologist who made the first ascent of Mount Everest via the west ridge; the Hornbein Couloir on Everest was named in his honor. On top of his mountaineering achievements, Hornbein was a professor of anesthesiology and physiology at the University of Washington.

== Early life and education ==
Thomas Frederic Hornbein was born in St. Louis, Missouri, on November 6, 1930. His mother, Rosalie (Bernstein) Hornbein, was a housewife, and his father, Leonard Hornbein, was a department store advertiser. Hornbein states that he had a desire to be outside since his childhood, and that he would climb trees and houses in St. Louis. When he was 13, his parents sent him to a camp in Colorado, and he considers that a pivotal moment in his life.

At age 13, Hornbein attended the Cheley Colorado Camps. He credits his experiences as a camper and a counselor there with discovering his love of mountains. He later attended the University of Colorado Boulder and majored in geology, though his interests changed and he changed his major to pre-medicine. He received a Bachelor of Arts degree in 1952. In 1956, he received a Doctor of Medicine degree from the Washington University School of Medicine. Following his medical degree, Hornbein completed an internship in Seattle before returning to St. Louis for his residency and a postdoctoral fellowship in anesthesiology.

== Career ==
From 1961 to 1963, Hornbein served in the United States Navy, where he became a lieutenant commander and was stationed at the San Diego Naval Hospital. He was allowed an early discharge to join the American mountaineering expedition.

Hornbein and his partners Willi Unsoeld and Dick Emerson attempted to climb Mount Everest in 1963 as part of the American Everest Expedition. Jim Whittaker and Nawang Gombu Sherpa from this expedition had summited on May 1, 1963. Hornbein, Unsoeld, and Emerson were the first to attempt an ascent of the daunting West Ridge. Previously, ascents of the mountain had been made only via the South Col and Southeast Ridge or the North Col and Northeast Ridge. Their plan was to climb up the West Ridge and down the Southeast Ridge/South Col route. This would make theirs the first traverse of an 8000-meter peak.

On May 22, 1963, at 6:50 a.m. they left their final camp and started the climb (Emerson stayed at the high camp due to altitude sickness), and even though progress was very slow made it to the summit at 6:15 that night. They found themselves hours behind the generally accepted schedule and after spending 20 minutes at the top they began the descent. Shortly after they started Unsoeld ran out of oxygen.

At 9:30 they came upon two other Americans from the same expedition, Barry Bishop and Lute Jerstad. Bishop and Jerstad had reached the summit earlier in the day using the South Col route and by this time were exhausted and nearly out of oxygen. The four climbers roped together on the descent and continued to make very slow progress until they felt it was too dangerous and stopped sometime after midnight.

They huddled together until 4:00 a.m. and started down again, meeting expedition members carrying extra tanks of oxygen. They made it to camp to find Unsoeld's feet hard and frostbitten. Barry Bishop and Lute Jerstad also suffered from frostbite and Bishop and Unsoeld lost toes as a result.

Hornbein wrote about this night event in his book Everest: The West Ridge: "The night was overwhelming empty. The black silhouette of the Lhotse Mountain was lurking there, half to see, half to assume, and below us. In general, there was nothing – simply nothing. We hung in a timeless gap, pained by an intensive cold air – and had the idea not to be able to do anything but to shiver and to wait for the sun rising."

Hornbein named the Hornbein Couloir, a steep gully which he and Unsoeld climbed in the uppermost part of the north wall. In his book Into Thin Air, Jon Krakauer writes that "Hornbein's and Unsoeld's ascent was--and continues to be--deservedly hailed as one of the great feats in the annals of mountaineering."

In the year 2002 Hornbein, 72 years old, was still active as a professor of Anesthesiology and as a mountaineer. In 2006, he moved from the Seattle area to Estes Park, Colorado, where he lived with his wife, Kathy Mikesell Hornbein, a retired pediatrician and young adult novelist. They climbed regularly in the Colorado Rockies.

Hornbein appeared in the 2026 documentary Everest: The Other Side where in 2021, he is shown meeting with Jim Morrison (mountaineer), Hilaree Nelson, and Jimmy Chin and expressing delighted wonder at their plans to climb the North Face (Everest) and then ski down it.

== Death ==
Thomas Hornbein died at his home in Estes Park, Colorado, on May 6, 2023, at the age of 92.

== Awards ==
On April 14, 2018, Hornbein was awarded the Lifetime Achievement Award by The Mountaineers (club), a Seattle-based mountaineering club and publisher of mountaineering books.

== Book ==
- Hornbein, Thomas F. (July 1998). Everest: The West Ridge. Mountaineers Books. ISBN 0-89886-616-2.
