= Norman Dyhrenfurth =

American film director, cinematographer and mountaineer (1918–2017)

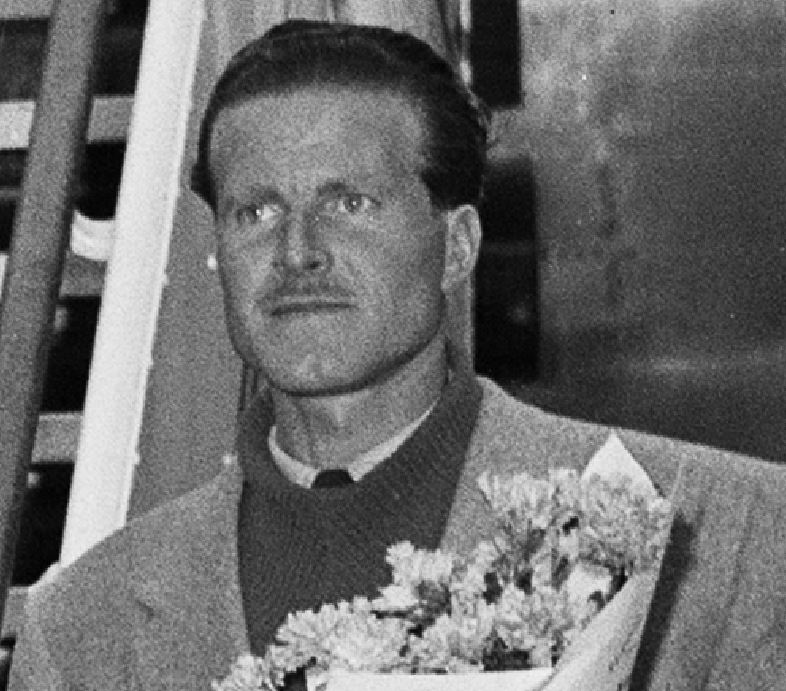
- Dyhrenfurth during the 1952 Swiss Mount Everest expedition
- Born: May 7, 1918; Breslau, German Empire
- Died: September 24, 2017 (aged 99); Salzburg, Austria
- Family: Oscar Vogt (brother-in-law)

Norman Gunther Dyhrenfurth (May 7, 1918 – September 24, 2017) was a German-Swiss-American mountaineer and filmmaker. He was the leader of the first successful American Mount Everest Expedition of 1963, which placed six climbers on the summit.

== Family and early years ==
Norman Dyhrenfurth was born in Germany, the son of Himalayan explorers Günter Oskar Dyhrenfurth and Hettie Dyhrenfurth. His mother was of half Jewish ancestry. After the Nazis came to power, they emigrated, first to Austria in 1933, then two years later to Switzerland, where they became citizens. In 1936, Dyhrenfurth's parents were awarded a gold medal for alpinism at the 1936 Summer Olympics in Berlin. He emigrated to the United States in 1937. His service in the United States Army enabled him to gain joint U.S.-Swiss citizenship. He was the founder of the Motion Picture Division of the Department of Theater Arts at UCLA, but resigned that position in 1952. In 1954, he was a Fulbright scholar in Italy.

== Climbing ==
Dyhrenfurth first came to the attention of the mountaineering community in the United States in 1939, when he completed some challenging climbs in the Grand Tetons. He was a participant in the 1952 Swiss Mount Everest Expedition. In 1960, he was cameraman for the Swiss expedition to Dhaulagiri, and after that climb, approached the government of Nepal about obtaining a permit for an American expedition to climb Mount Everest. He learned that a permit had already been granted to another American climber, William Hackett. Although Dyhrenfurth tried to combine his efforts with Hackett's, that expedition failed to gain funding and never took place. Another application resulted in India being selected for an attempt to climb Everest, but Dyhrenfurth persevered and tried again.

== 1963 Everest expedition ==
Dyhrenfurth received a permit from the Nepalese authorities on May 10, 1961, for an American expedition to climb Mount Everest in the spring of 1963. He recruited a team of climbers that included Jake Breitenbach, Jim Whittaker, Willi Unsoeld, Lute Jerstad, Tom Hornbein, Dave Dingman and Barry Bishop. William Siri was the deputy team leader. Al Auten was the radio operator, and Gil Roberts was the team doctor. Sherpa Nawang Gombu was also part of the team.

On March 23, 1963, Breitenbach was killed in the collapse of a serac in the Khumbu Icefall just above Everest Base Camp. The members of the expedition decided to proceed. Dyhrenfurth's style of leadership being democratic and team-oriented, he called a meeting, discussed the tragedy, let everyone speak, and when the decision was made to continue, the team remained intact. Dyhrenfurth's leadership style included a "commitment to consensus", and he was considered by those who have studied the expedition a "huge asset to the team".

On May 1, Whittaker and Gombu reached the summit of Mount Everest by the South Col route used by the successful British expedition of 1953.

On May 22, Unsoeld and Hornbein completed the first ascent of the West Ridge, descending by the South Col, thus completing the first traverse of Everest. That same day, Bishop and Jerstad reached the summit by the South Col route. The two pairs of climbers met up high on the mountain, and made their descent in the gathering darkness. From midnight until 4:00 am, they bivouacked high on the mountain, without sleeping bags, tents or bottled oxygen. All survived, though Unsoeld and Bishop suffered from frostbite, resulting in the amputation of toes.

On July 8, 1963, President John F. Kennedy presented the National Geographic Society's Hubbard Medal to Dyhrenfurth at a ceremony in the flower garden of the White House. The surviving members of the expedition were also present. Kennedy told Dyhrenfurth that "we followed your actions with the greatest pride." In 1965 Dyhrenfurth's film Americans on Everest aired on CBS television as the first National Geographic special.

== 1971 International Expedition ==
Along with J. O. M. Roberts of the United Kingdom, Dyhrenfurth co-led the unsuccessful 1971 International Expedition, which attempted to climb Mount Everest by two routes. The climbers included Dougal Haston and Don Whillans of the United Kingdom, Wolfgang Axt of Austria, Odd Eliassen of Norway, David Isles of the United States, Yvette and Michel Vaucher of Switzerland, Carlo Mauri of Italy, Naomi Uemura of Japan, Australian journalist Murray Sayle and Harsh Vardhan Bahuguna of India. The expedition ended in disarray after Bahuguna was killed high on the mountain.

== The Eiger Sanction ==
Dyhrenfurth was the chief technical advisor for the 1975 Clint Eastwood movie The Eiger Sanction. Experienced mountaineers including Mike Hoover, Dougal Haston and Hamish MacInnes were also part of the team.

== Five Days One Summer ==
Dyhrenfurth was second unit director and technical advisor for the 1982 film Five Days One Summer, starring Sean Connery.

== Legacy ==
In 1988, Dyhrenfurth was awarded the Tenzing Norgay Award, given by The Explorers Club.

He died in Salzburg, Austria, at the age of 99 in 2017.
