= 1963 American Mount Everest expedition =

First traverse and American ascent

Coordinates: 27°59′18″N 86°55′31″E

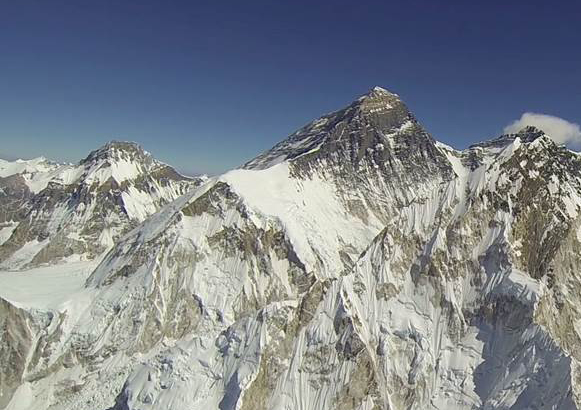
Mount Everest from the west with West Ridge sloping down over snowfield (center), flanked by Changtse (left) and Lhotse (right background)

On the 1963 American Mount Everest expedition, Jim Whittaker and Sherpa Nawang Gombu reached the summit of Mount Everest on May 1, 1963, using the conventional route via the South Col. This was the first time the summit had been reached by an American. However, on May 22 two other team members also reached the summit, this time taking a route that traversed (Note: In mountaineering, the word "traverse" can be used in various rather different ways but the meaning here is to go up one side of a mountain and down another.) the mountain by ascending the West Ridge and moving onto the North Face to attain the summit before descending via the Southeast Ridge and the South Col. Everest had never been traversed before.

Back home in the United States, the main cause for celebration by press, politicians and the public was Whittaker's achievement. Worldwide, however, the mountaineering establishment and enthusiasts regarded the traverse via the West Ridge by the Americans Tom Hornbein and Willi Unsoeld as the greater achievement. In any case, the expedition led to a burgeoning of mountaineering in the United States over the following decades.

The leader of the expedition was Norman Dyhrenfurth who had been the photographer on the 1952 Swiss Mount Everest expedition. At a White House reception for the team when they returned to the United States, he accepted the Hubbard Medal from president John F. Kennedy on behalf of the whole team.

== Background ==
=== Climbing on Everest prior to 1963 ===
After the 1921 British reconnaissance, attempts to climb Everest had been from Tibet because Nepal was closed to foreign climbers. Then, in 1950, Tibet's borders were closed when it was occupied by the People's Republic of China and by that time no expedition had been able to reach the summit. Partly on account of the political situation in Tibet, Nepal started allowing climbers entry in 1950. After the reconnaissance expedition of 1951, the Swiss attempts of 1952 nearly reached the summit via the Khumbu Icefall, Western Cwm, Geneva Spur, South Col and Southeast ridge. In 1953 the British reached the summit for the first time, largely following the Swiss route. The Swiss again succeeded in 1956 and China did so from the north on the 1960 Chinese expedition using a route over the North Col.

=== American involvement ===
John F. Kennedy's election as president of the United States brought in a marked change of rhetoric from that of the aging, conservative Eisenhower administration. America was to seek a "New Frontier" and in the Cold War would "pay any price, bear any burden ... to assure ... the success of liberty". The Green Berets and the Peace Corps extended their influence into Nepal, described in a recruitment advertisement as "The Land of Yeti and Everest".

Norman Dyhrenfurth thought this political situation might provide a good opportunity for progressing a long held ambition. Dyhrenfurth had emigrated from Switzerland to the United States in 1937, shortly before World War II, and he was, like his father Gunther Dyhrenfurth, an amateur mountaineer. From the time in 1952 when he had been the official photographer on the Swiss Mount Everest expedition he had held an ambition to lead his own expedition up the mountain. Based on the experience of previous Everest expeditions, he would need to raise several hundred thousand dollars, an amount previously unachievable in the United States. Bolstered by the Chinese claim to have left a bust of Mao Zedong on the summit during their 1960 expedition, he took a clearly political approach claiming that a successful ascent would help towards "winning new friends in many places". He wrote seeking a meeting with Kennedy and took the reply from Jerome Wiesner merely offering Kennedy's "best wishes" as being the president's strong endorsement for an expedition in 1963.

Dyhrenfurth's seemingly extravagant appeal for $186,000 (equivalent to $2 million in 2025 prices) appalled the American mountaineering establishment with Charles Houston, who had led the 1938 American K2 expedition, claiming that such a large expedition violated the true spirit of mountain climbing. (Note: The team member and author of the book giving the official account of the expedition, James Ramsey Ullman, wrote "In [our United States], raising money for a mountaineering venture is only slightly less difficult than, say, soliciting funds for the erection of a statue of Karl Marx on the White House Lawn".) However, the resulting controversy in the press, together with Kennedy's earlier rhetoric, helped the cause with major support coming from the National Geographic Society which provided $114,000 ($1.23 million in 2025 prices) but only if there was a scientific component to the venture. Dyhrenfurth had anticipated this and arranged scientific work that would only involve the climbing of the mountain and that nearly all the scientists would be mountaineers. The eventual cost was $400,000 ($4.3 million in 2025 prices).

== Preparations ==
To emphasize the expedition's scientific credentials, Dyhrenfurth selected an academic team – five had doctorates, eight held master's degrees and only two were non-graduates. The team's deputy was Will Siri, a physiologist, who coordinated the scientific program. He had been on (and led) several oversees expeditions, including to Nepal. James Ramsey Ullman was to write the official account of the expedition but he did not get far beyond Kathmandu because of illness. All were American except Jimmy Roberts, the transport officer, who was British and lived in Nepal.

Team members and notable Sherpas
Name	role on expedition	age (Note: At time of expedition.)	profession	education
Climbers
Al Auten	radio communications	36	editor	BS Physical; Sciences
Barry Bishop	still photography	31	photographer for National Geographic	BS Geology; MS Geography
Jake Breitenbach		27	mountain guide	BS Mathematics
Barry Corbet		26	mountain guide and ski instructor	Geology Major
Dave Dingman	doctor	26	physician	MD
Dan Doody	cinematography	29	film maker	BS Agricultural; Mechanics
Norman Dyhrenfurth	leader, cinematography	44	film producer-director, explorer	Fulbright Scholar
Tom Hornbein	oxygen	32	anesthesiologist	MD
Lute Jerstad		26	speech instructor, mountain guide	MA Speech
Jim Lester	psychology of climbers	35	clinical psychologist	PhD
Maynard Miller	geology and glaciology	41	professor of geology	BS, MA Geology; PhD
Dick Pownall	food planning	35	math & PE instructor	BS, MA
Barry Prather	geologist, radio	23	aeronautics engineer	BS Physics
Gil Roberts	doctor	28	physician	MD
Jimmy Roberts	transport and Sherpas	45	lieutenant colonel, British Army (retired)	
Will Siri	deputy leader, science coordinator	44	physicist	PhD
Jim Ullman	expedition author	55	writer about mountaineering	BA
Willi Unsoeld		36	professor, director Peace Corps, Nepal	BS Physics; PhD Philosophy
Jim Whittaker	clothing and equipment planning	34	outdoor recreation store manager	BS Biology
Sherpas
Chotari	assistant sirdar			
Ang Dawa	Sherpa for Dyhrenfurth	38		
Girmi Dorje	Sherpa for Whittaker			
Phu Dorje	assistant sirdar			
Nawang Gombu	Sherpa & interpreter	≈30		
Passang Phutar	sirdar			

== Trek from Kathmandu ==
The expedition left Kathmandu on February 20, traveling by jeep the first 15 miles (24 km) to Banepa before starting a 190-mile (310 km) trek to Namche Bazaar just south of Everest. There were 37 Sherpas and 909 porters carrying 65-pound (29 kg) loads – in all 29 tons (26 tonnes) of equipment and supplies. In trying to help in fund raising, Dyhrenfurth had suggested they might attempt the "Grand Slam" of Everest, Lhotse and Nuptse but when this was discussed in detail during the walk-in the mountaineers were unenthusiastic. He had also considered descending Everest by its West Ridge after an ascent via the South Col but the idea then developed that the greater achievement (which would also be safer (Note: Without prior reconnaissance there would be no way of knowing whether a West Ridge descent was possible and if they were blocked there would be no means of retreat.)) would be to climb Everest by its West Ridge.

Hornbein strongly favored making this the main target, along with abandoning a climb by the conventional South Col route. In the end it was agreed to send a four-man team up via the South Col to attempt the summit and to separately, and secondarily, reconnoiter the West Ridge which would at least provide photographs of the Tibetan side of the mountain. If the reconnaissance was successful a traverse of Everest could be attempted. The expedition would also attempt Lhotse.

Approach march, Kathmandu to Base Camp (part marked red in jeeps)

== Eventual camps established on climbs ==
Camps on routes to summit (Note: Although different sources only have slight differences between the quoted altitudes of the camps, the dates of "establishment" can vary by a few days because the definition is not precise.)
Southeast Ridge route	elevation feet (meters)	established (1963)	West Ridge route	elevation feet (meters)	established (1963)
Base Camp	17,800 ft (5,400 m)	March 21			
stores dump	19,200 ft (5,900 m)	March 26			
Camp I	20,200 ft (6,200 m)	March 28			
Advance Base Camp	21,350 ft (6,510 m)	March 31			
Camp III	22,900 ft (7,000 m)	April 14	Camp 3W	23,800 ft (7,300 m)	April 9
			West Shoulder	24,000 ft (7,320 m)	
Camp IV	24,900 ft (7,600 m)	April 14	Camp 4W	25,100 ft (7,700 m)	May 15
Camp V (South Col)	26,200 ft (8,000 m)	April 29	Camp 5W	27,250 ft (8,310 m)	May 21
Camp VI	27,450 ft (8,370 m)	April 30			
summit	29,028 ft (8,848 m)	May 1 & 22		29,028 ft (8,848 m)	May 22

== Preparations for summit attempts ==
=== Advance Base Camp in Western Cwm ===
On March 21 the party reached Base Camp and over the next two days they started setting a route up the Khumbu Icefall. Meanwhile, some of the West Ridge enthusiasts climbed to get a better view of the Ridge and it gave a very daunting impression with its 5,000-foot (1,500 m) line of steep rock scarcely covered with any snow. However, this also made it a more alluring challenge. On March 23, an ice cliff on the Icefall collapsed without warning, burying Breitenbach, whose body could not be recovered from under tons of ice. The climbers considered giving up the expedition, or the West Ridge aspect, but they decided to carry on and reached the Western Cwm where on March 30 Camp I was established. Camp II, established at 21,350 feet (6,510 m) on April 2, was to become Advance Base Camp at the point from which the two ascent routes would diverge.

=== West Ridge reconnaissance ===
Initially, the West Ridge reconnaissance was to take priority. Most climbers preferred the South Col effort but they also wanted to avoid ongoing arguments and they thought the West Ridge efforts would eventually fail anyway. Hornbein's team was weakened by the death of Breitenbach and by Corbet and Emerson's failure to acclimatize. Only Hornbein, Unsoeld, Bishop and Dingman were available and Dingman was not fully fit. Setting off on April 3, Unsoeld and Bishop climbed 1,000 feet (300 m) and returned to Advance Base Camp. On April 5 Hornbein and Bishop retraced this route and then climbed towards the left up ice slopes until they could cross snow slopes over to the right reaching 23,500 feet (7,200 m) with the West Shoulder above them leading to the upper West Ridge. The Shoulder could provide a staging point for porters to leave supplies once the route there had been made safe.

With the help of Sherpas camp 3W was established and by April 11, from the Shoulder, the four climbers could examine the terrain all the way up to the summit. If they were forced off the crest of the ridge it would need to be onto the Everest's North Face (technically in China) rather than the steeper Southwest Face.

They could see over the northern approaches to Everest from Tibet and to the North Col, 1,000 feet (300 m) below them and across a vast amphitheater of glaciers. The ridge immediately ahead looked difficult so they prospected both this route and a gully sloping to the left to the foot of a location later to be known as the Hornbein Couloir. (Note: The gully leading to the foot of the Hornbein Couloir was called the "Diagonal Ditch" by the expedition.) Neither route seemed possible for porters who would be required for an attempt on the summit. On April 13 they climbed to 25,100 feet (7,700 m) where they found a site suitable for a Camp 4W and a possible route towards the summit.

By the time they had returned to the Western Cwm on April 13 after their West Ridge reconnaissance, the South Col group had taken a vote that resolved to have two teams dedicated to the South Col route. This meant no Sherpas would be available for the West Ridge. Dyhrenfurth did, however, offer the West Ridge climbers the opportunity to join in the South Col approach to the summit – Bishop was the only climber to accept this offer.

== Summit via South Col ==
South Col Route (brown) and West Ridge–North Face route (red)

The route preparation up the Lhotse Face made rapid progress and the South Col was reached on April 16, well before monsoon season. The first summit team consisted of the climbing pair of Whittaker and Gombu, with a second pair of Dyhrenfurth himself and his Sherpa Ang Dawa. The second team was Bishop, Jerstad, Pownall and Girmi Dorje. A third team of Dingman and Prather would attempt the summit of Lhotse. The first summit team left Advance Base Camp on April 27 and established Camp VI at 27,450 feet (8,370 m) on the Southeast Ridge on April 30. This top camp was some 450 feet (140 m) lower than Dyhrenfurth had planned but he, laden with camera equipment, had lagged behind: the Sherpas had already positioned the camp and were on their way back down before anything could be done. Worse, the whole party had been using far more oxygen than had been planned and the Sherpas were even using it when descending.

Next day the two pairs of climbers set off one hour apart in very windy conditions but the second pair, laden with the camera equipment, had to turn back. Gombu and Whittaker reached the summit at 13:00 on May 1, being careful to arrive exactly together so as to avoid press criticism. There was nothing visible of anything left from the 1960 Chinese expedition. Unable to make radio contact either with the South Col camp or Base Camp, they returned to Camp VI where Dyhrenfurth and Ang Dawa were waiting.

The plan had been for the first team to descend all the way to the South Col on May 1, leaving Camp VI free for the second team. However, the second team did not attempt to go up to this camp because they assumed the summit bid would have been delayed. On May 2, because of a shortage of oxygen supplies, with only Bishop and Jerstad climbing up towards Camp VI, they found the first team members descending, and in a very poor physical condition. They all returned to the South Col and then retreated down the Lhotse Face. The attempt on Lhotse was also abandoned.

News of the summit achievement reached the world's press on May 3 but the names of the climbers had been kept secret so the newspapers would not ignore any later summit success. President Kennedy, not knowing that one of the successful climbers was a Sherpa, announced "I know that all Americans will join me in saluting our gallant countrymen". However, when back at Base Camp, there were recriminations. Dyhrenfurth blamed Hornbein for the shortage of oxygen on the col though he was later to acknowledge that it was not there that the problem lay. (Note: Dyhrenfurth himself had used oxygen continuously at and above the col and yet had still been unable to photograph or film near the summit. He had not rationed other people effectively but had blamed Hornbein for not taking sufficiently many oxygen cylinders on the expedition and for keeping too many cylinders back for the West Ridge party.) Unsoeld was able to restrain Hornbein's anger, and Bishop maintained his calm during these discussions but was very critical of the overall leadership in a letter he wrote back home. However, they were still halfway up the mountain early in the season and so were about to embark on what was to become, at least in mountaineering circles, part of mountaineering history. Because Dyhrenfurth had been unable to film anything from near the summit he restaged some action near Base Camp and pretended it was filmed at Camp VI. Unsworth says it was only because of the comparatively lackluster performance on the first summit climb that the traverse was even seriously attempted. There would be two separate attempts up different routes on the same day, meeting at the summit, and descending together. Bishop wrote "Lute Jerstad & I have the nod & we'll move up the 11th for an 'all or nothing' try on the 18th. Plans call for Unsoeld & Hornbein to try for top the same day – via the W. Ridge. Talk about a long shot!".

== Summit via West Ridge and North Face ==
While the South Col efforts had been underway Hornbein and Unsoeld had been continuing their West Ridge preparations in so far as they were able. Corbet and Emerson had recovered from altitude sickness and Auten, the radio operator, had joined them. Without Sherpas, their main problem was to lift supplies up to the West Shoulder. They had tried a winch but this was not at all effective. Mostly by manhauling, between April 16 and May 13, the five men managed to carry up what was needed.

On May 14 Unsoeld, now with Sherpas, reached Camp 4W on the West Shoulder, dumped their loads, and returned to 3W. On May 15 Unsoeld and Hornbein reached the foot of the Hornbein Couloir while Corbet joined Auten at 3W. On May 16 Emerson, fighting his returning sickness, set off for 3W in a storm, just missing Dyhrenfurth's order for him to descend. He was not able to reach the camp but he successfully bivouacked in a crevasse. At about midnight, two of the three tents at 4W were blown away 50 yards (46 m) down the cliffs towards the West Rongbuk Glacier in Tibet with Corbet, Auten and four Sherpas inside them. In the morning everyone retreated to 3W. Hornbein later said they would have gone on down to Advance Base Camp if they had not been too tired. A new plan was agreed that only two climbers – Hornbein and Unsoeld – would attempt the summit and there would only be a single camp above 4W, not two as intended previously. Dyhrenfurth, over the radio, approved the plan, accepted the further delay, and started dispatching further supplies.

On May 20 All India Radio news said that the monsoon would arrive in the Everest vicinity any day soon. On that day they reoccupied 4W and next day Corbet and Auten set out, followed by Hornbein, Unsoeld, Emerson and five Sherpas. Hornbein wrote, "Our plans for May 21 seemed a little ridiculous. First, Barry and Al had to explore and prepare an unknown route to the site for our high camp, 5W. We would give them a 2½-hour headstart. Next, five untried Sherpas must traverse the North Face, climbing more than two thousand vertical feet with loads, twice the distance ever carried before at that altitude". They climbed part way up the Hornbein Couloir to where it started to cross the Yellow Band to establish Camp 5W on a tiny ledge. (Note: Hornbein later speculated that the couloir would have been much more difficult if the recent storm had not blown off most of the snow.) The Hornbein Couloir is a few hundred yards (metres) west of the Norton Couloir, also on the North Face. Waking at 04:00 and leaving camp at 07:00, Hornbein and Unsoeld set off for the summit taking oxygen, food and walkie-talkie but abandoning tent and sleeping bags.

The slope up the Hornbein Couloir across the Yellow Band was at 55° and it took four hours to climb the first 400 feet (120 m). At the end of the couloir they encountered a 60-foot (18 m) cliff. Hornbein managed to place a piton only 8 feet (2.4 m) from the top of the cliff but then, exhausted, he had to abseil down. Unsoeld, helped by the rope, reached the piton and then reached the top of the cliff where Hornbein could now join him. From there, there was no retreat (Note: With few pitons, they were having to remove each piton as they climbed.) and they would have to descend via the South Col. Once out of the couloir they found the way ahead led to the Northeast Ridge so they changed direction to the right on the North Face and then climbed to the West Ridge very near to the summit itself. The final stage of the climb was comparatively straightforward and at 18:15 on May 22, 1963, they reached the summit arm in arm.

The original plan had been for two pairs to tackle the West Ridge and Bishop and Jerstad would ascend the Southeast Ridge hoping to meet them on the summit with Dingman, Roberts and Dorje going as high as possible. If they could not meet on the summit, all climbers would descend by the route they had come up, it being too dangerous for the West Ridge climbers to take the Southeast Ridge without support. Hornbein and Unsoeld were too late in the day for the planned rendezvous but they could see Bishop and Jerstad's footprints in the snow and knew the way back down the West Ridge was impossible. After radioing down to Advance Base Camp they descended by the Southeast Ridge, reaching the South Summit at 19:30 in the dark. They shouted hoping for support from Camp VI but it was Bishop and Jerstad, trapped 400 feet (120 m) below them, who heard and replied. They had reached the summit at 15:30 but, after taking some motion film, had left at 16:15 and had become exhausted on the descent. The four climbers carefully went on down but stopped at midnight and settled on a rock to wait for daylight, huddling together at over 28,000 feet (8,500 m) through the clear, still night. As they went further down the Southeast Ridge next morning they met Dingman and Dorje coming up, searching. They had expected to find their companions missing or dead but instead found they were able to assist all four of them.

== Subsequent events ==
=== Return home ===
When all climbers were down at Base Camp the news was radioed to Kathmandu and was in the US newspapers the same day. On May 27, from Namche Bazaar, Bishop and Unsoeld, who both had frostbitten feet, were taken by helicopter to hospital in Kathmandu while the rest of the expedition started their trek back there on foot. Jerstad had lesser frostbite and needed to be carried on a stretcher but he eventually recovered and Hornbein was unaffected. While still in Nepal, Unsoeld lost all but one of his toes, while at Bethesda Naval Hospital Bishop needed all his toes and two finger tips amputating. In New Delhi they were received by prime minister Nehru and ambassador J.K. Galbraith.

=== Reception in America ===
Back in the United States the reception was overwhelmingly focused on the first American ascent. It was announced on the front page of the New York Times on May 3 even though at the time Whittaker's name had not been disclosed. Three weeks later the first traverse, which received far more attention from the mountaineering establishment in Europe, was only mentioned on page 28 although in retrospect it could be seen as ushering in an Alpine style of climbing on an "eight-thousander". Whittaker became the hero of the expedition and the only person whose name became well known. The firm he worked for, Recreational Equipment Incorporated, a consumers' cooperative organization, increased its membership from 50,000 to 250,000 between 1965 and 1972 and its outlets spread nationwide from a single Seattle store.

The National Geographic Society proclaimed it as their expedition and Dyhrenfurth was offended when he was ignored. However by July 8 matters had been rectified and Dyhrenfurth was presented with the Hubbard Medal by President Kennedy. (Note: Dyhrenfurth said he accepted the medal on behalf of all the team. Replica medals were given to the other members of the expedition.)

=== Afterwards ===
In 1965 National Geographic's film Americans on Everest, narrated by Orson Welles, aired on CBS television and received the highest ratings for a documentary up until that time.

Also in 1965, Whittaker famously led senator Robert Kennedy on the first ascent of Mount Kennedy, which had recently been named for the first time for the recently assassinated president.

The entire crest of the West Ridge was climbed for the first time, from its lowest point at the Lho La to the summit of Everest, by the 1979 Yugoslav Mount Everest expedition.
