= Dyhrenfurth =

Dyhrenfurth is a surname. Notable people with the surname include:

- Günter Dyhrenfurth (1886–1975), German-Swiss mountaineer, husband of Hettie
- Hettie Dyhrenfurth (1892–1972), German-Swiss mountaineer
- Norman Dyhrenfurth (1918–2017), German-Swiss-American mountaineer and filmmaker
