= Barry Bishop (mountaineer) =

American mountain climber (1932–1994)

- Born: January 13, 1932; Cincinnati, Ohio
- Died: September 24, 1994 (aged 62); Pocatello, Idaho

Barry Chapman Bishop (January 13, 1932 – September 24, 1994) was an American mountaineer, scientist, photographer and scholar. With teammates Jim Whittaker, Lute Jerstad, Willi Unsoeld and Tom Hornbein, he was a member of the American Mount Everest Expedition led by Norman Dyhrenfurth, the first American team to summit Mount Everest on May 22, 1963. He reached the summit of Mount Everest by the South Col route on May 22, 1963 with fellow American Lute Jerstad, sharing the honor of becoming the second and third Americans to stand on Everest's summit. Prior to his Everest summit, Bishop participated in several other notable first ascents; the West Buttress route on Denali in 1951, and the South West ridge route on 6,170 meter Himalayan peak Ama Dablam in 1961. He worked for the National Geographic Society for most of his life, beginning as a picture editor in 1959 and serving as a photographer, writer, and scientist with the society until his retirement in 1994. He was killed in an automobile accident near Pocatello, Idaho later that year.

== Early life ==
Barry Chapman Bishop was born on January 13, 1932, to Robert Wilson Bishop, a sociologist who was to become a dean at the University of Cincinnati, and Helen Rebecca Bishop. He was fascinated by climbing from an early age, spending his summers with the YMCA in Colorado and joining the Colorado Mountain Club at age nine or ten. Under the tutelage of the club's members, many of whom were also members of the 10th Mountain Division, Bishop quickly learned mountaineering skills and was guiding expeditions in the Rockies and Tetons by age 12.

He attended school in Cincinnati; first a private school, then a private college preparatory school beginning in 8th grade and finally graduated from Walnut Hills High School, the city's top ranked public college preparatory school, in 1959. He was inducted into the Walnut Hills High School hall of fame in 2007. He began his undergraduate education at Dartmouth, where he roomed with Rodger Ewy and Bill Chafee. Following an acute lung infection, Barry soon switched to the University of Cincinnati, earning a Bachelor of Science in Geology with Omicron Delta Kappa honors in 1954. While at Cincinnati, Barry was a member of Beta Theta Pi. As part of his undergraduate research, he did field work in the Denali area in the summer of 1951, during which time he participated in Bradford Washburn's expedition, reaching the summit on July 10, 1951, to claim the fourth ascent of the mountain and the first by the West Buttress route. He met Lila Mueller, also an undergraduate at the University of Cincinnati, and the two were married in 1955.

In the summer of 1952, Barry and Rodger Ewy climbed without guides on many classics routes in Europe including the Zugspitze Ridge, Cime Grande in the Dolomites, Z'mutt Ridge on the Matterhorn, the traverse from Gornergrat to Monte Rosa via summits of Breithorn, Castor and Pollux and both summits of Monte Rosa, and the Dent du Requin Needle on Mont Blanc. Barry soloed the Italian Ridge on the Matterhorn.

His studies continued at Northwestern University, where he earned a master's in geography in 1954–1955, studying shear moraines on the Greenland Icecap. During his work in Greenland he met Rear Admiral Richard E. Byrd, and after joining the Air Force, served as scientific advisor to Byrd's staff with Admiral Dufek, at the Antarctic Projects Office in Washington, D.C., where he monitored international scientific programs in polar research. By 1958, when he was honorably discharged from the Air Force at age 27, Bishop had accumulated considerable skills as a mountaineer, polar scientist, photographer and explorer.

== National Geographic Society ==
In May, 1959, on the strength of his photographs from Antarctica and the Bugaboos, Bishop was hired by the National Geographic Society as Picture Editor for National Geographic. He rose quickly with the magazine, becoming a photographer for the magazine in 1960, and had his first published photography in 1962. His 1963 photography work on the American Everest Expedition earned him a National Press Photographers Association Special Award. Eventually he would become a vice president and Chairman of the Committee for Research and Exploration. In addition he was a member of The Explorers Club headquartered in New York.

== Himalayan expeditions ==
Bishop's work on shear moraines brought him to the attention of Sir Edmund Hillary, who invited him to join the 1960–1961 Himalayan Scientific and Mountaineering Expedition known as the Silver Hut expedition, where he served as the expedition's official glaciologist and climatologist. Though he was not sponsored by National Geographic on the trip, his photographic, scientific, and mountaineering accomplishments cemented his career with the Society. With fellow expedition members Mike Gill, Mike Ward and Wally Romanes, Bishop made the landmark first ascent of Ama Dablam, which was also the first winter ascent in the Himalayas.

Barry's success with the Hillary expedition and his work with National Geographic led to an invitation to join the 1963 American Everest Expedition, which aimed to make the first American ascent of Mount Everest. He was transferred to the National Geographic editorial staff and wrote an account of the expedition for the magazine, accompanied by his photography. On nearing the mountain, the expedition decided to attempt the unclimbed West Ridge, and Bishop helped establish a route up to the summit pyramid at 25,100 feet (7,700 m) before transferring to the portion of the team attempting the South Col. Via that route, Jim Whittaker summitted on May 1, becoming the first American to do so. In the following weeks, Tom Hornbein and Willi Unsoeld continued the attempt on the West Ridge, and Bishop and Lute Jerstad attempted the South Col. After a stove accident early on the morning of May 22, the pair began the summit attempt, reaching the South Summit at 2:00 p.m. and the main summit at 3:30. They waited on the summit for signs of Hornbein and Unsoeld, who were also due to reach the summit that day, but short of oxygen and seeing no sign of them, they began to descend at 4:15. As darkness fell around 7:30, they made what was possibly voice contact with Hornbein and Unsoeld, who had indeed successfully summited via the West Ridge and were now above them, attempting to descend to the South Col, thereby completing the first traverse on Everest. Still believing the other team had failed to summit, Bishop told his partner he thought the two of them were dead and the voice they heard was God calling them to heaven. The four eventually managed to defy all odds and rendezvous but, due to the extreme danger of down climbing without fixed ropes in the dark, decided to bivouac. Having no tents they could only huddle together while kneeling or sitting on their packs to rest. During the night, temperatures dropped to −18 °F (−28 °C), but winds remained calm allowing them to survive. Bishop sustained frostbite that would result in the loss of all his toes and the tip of his little finger.

On July 8, 1963, the team was awarded the Hubbard Medal by president John F. Kennedy for their achievement.

== The Nanda Devi affair ==
Bishop was involved in the development of a joint operation by the United States Central Intelligence Agency (CIA) and the Indian Intelligence Bureau in 1965. The mission's objective was to place a nuclear-powered surveillance device on Nanda Devi which could be used to monitor China's nuclear program during the Cold War. It was Bishop who initiated the early contact with Mohan Singh Kohli who was the leader of the 1965 Indian Everest Expedition and went on to lead the mission to install the device on Nanda Devi. Bishop wasn't part of the team on the mountain but he played a key part in recruiting the eight American mountaineers who joined the team on Nanda Devi or the nearby Nanda Kot. Four of those seven, Lute Jerstad, Barry Prather, Barry Corbet and Dave Dingman, had been on the 1963 American Mount Everest expedition with him, the other two were Tom Frost and Sandy Bill. Bishop was one of the people who met the Indian team when they travelled to the US for training on Denali in summer 1965.

== Later career ==
The loss of his toes marked the end of Bishop's technical climbing career, and in the late 1960s he refocused his energies on academics, enrolling in the University of Chicago's Ph.D. program in geography in 1966, assisting in high-altitude physiology studies, and planning and executing the field research for his dissertation, a cultural-ecological analysis of the Karnali Zone of western Nepal. The dissertation was eventually published in 1980 and in book form as Karnali Under Stress (1990).

Through the 1980s and early 90s, Bishop continued both his administrative duties with the National Geographic society as Vice Chairman and then Chairman of the Committee for Research and Exploration and Chief of the Geographic Liaison Office, and his research and service, leading Himalayan research expeditions in 1983 and 1985 and continuing to write for National Geographic. He retired in 1994 and moved to Bozeman, Montana.

On September 24, 1994, Bishop was on his way to deliver a lecture in San Francisco when he apparently veered onto the shoulder of the highway, lost control of his car, and was killed. He was survived by his wife Lila, who suffered minor injuries in the accident, and by his son Brent and daughter Tara. The National Geographic Society honored him posthumously with the Distinguished Geography Educator award in recognition of a life that "reflected National Geographic's mission of increasing and diffusing geographic knowledge." His daughter Tara is married to mountaineer Greg Mortenson, co-author of the New York Times best seller Three Cups of Tea.

== See also ==
- List of 20th-century summiters of Mount Everest
