= Willi Unsoeld =

American mountaineer

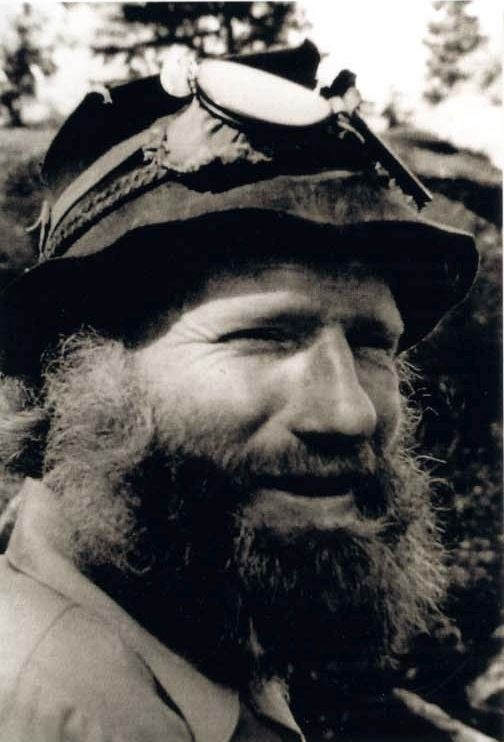
- Born: William Francis Unsoeld; October 5, 1926; Arcata, California, US
- Died: March 4, 1979 (aged 52); Mount Rainier, Washington, US
- Education: Oregon State University; University of California, Berkeley; University of Washington
- Known for: First ascent of the West Ridge of Mount Everest
- Notable work: Evergreen State College
- Spouse: Jolene Bishoprick (m. 1951)
- Children: 4
- Awards: Hubbard Medal, National Geographic Society

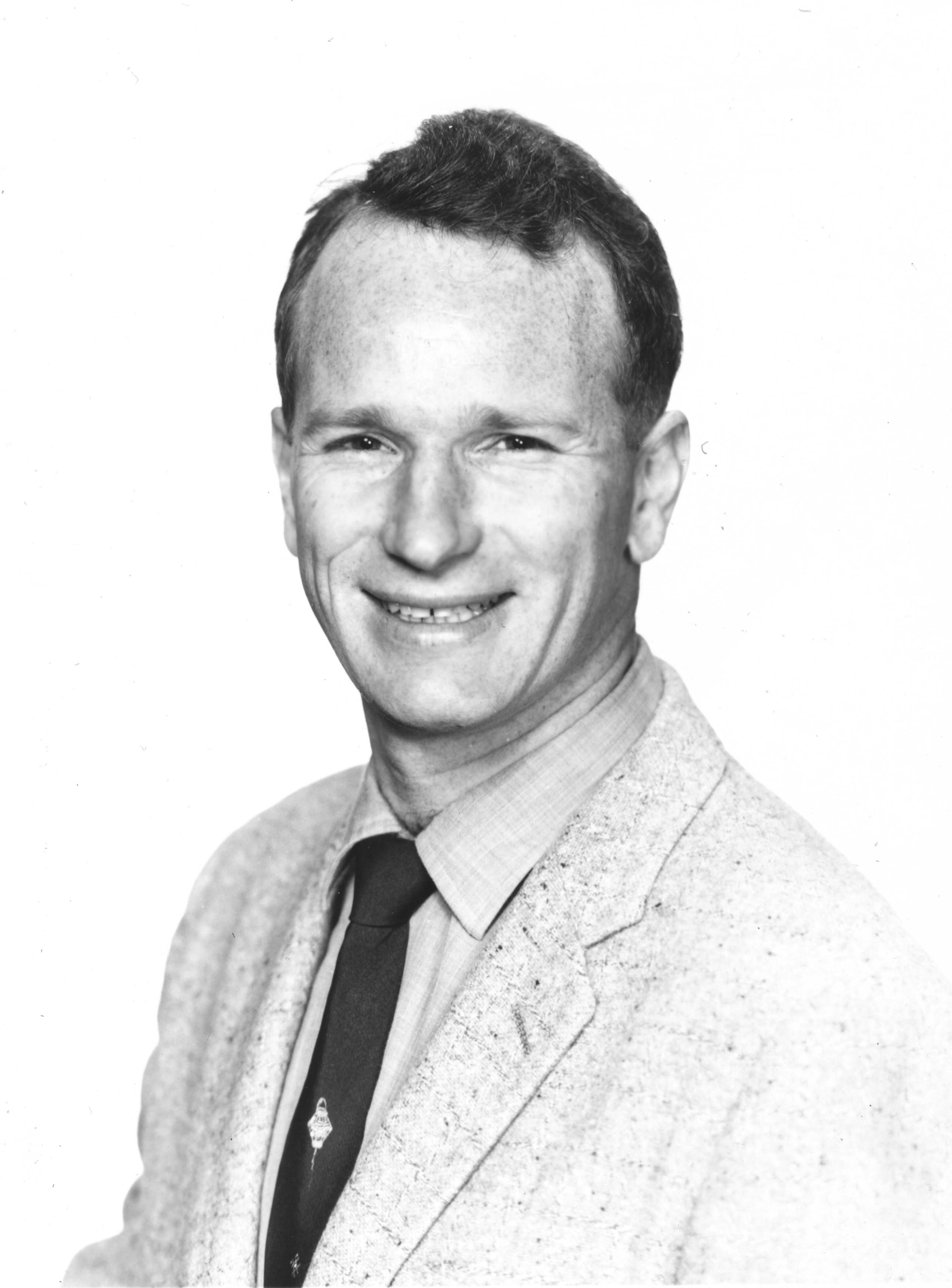
Willi Unsoeld

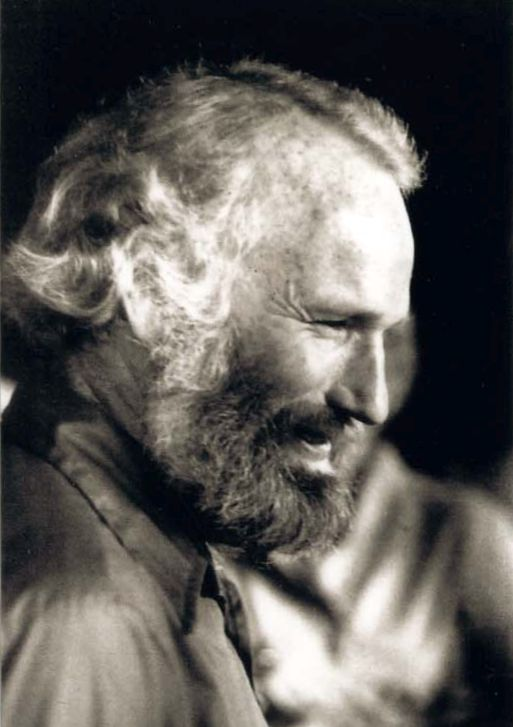
Willi Unsoeld

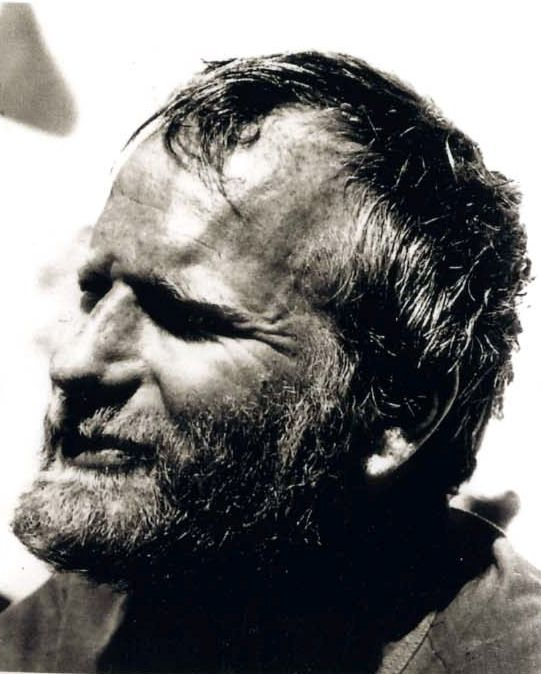
Willi Unsoeld

William Francis Unsoeld (October 5, 1926 – March 4, 1979) was an American mountaineer who was a member of the first American expedition to summit Mount Everest. The American Mount Everest Expedition was led by Norman Dyhrenfurth, and included Unsoeld, Jim Whittaker, Lute Jerstad, Barry Bishop and Tom Hornbein. Whittaker, with Sherpa Nawang Gombu, reached the summit on May 1, 1963. Unsoeld, Hornbein, Bishop and Jerstad reached the top on May 22, 1963. Unsoeld and Hornbein's climb was the first ascent from the peak's west ridge, and the first major traverse of a Himalayan peak. His subsequent activities included working as a U.S. Forest Service smokejumper, Peace Corps director in Nepal, speaker for Outward Bound, faculty member at Oregon State University and The Evergreen State College and mountaineering guide. He died on Mount Rainier in an avalanche.

== Early life ==
Born in Arcata, California, William Francis Unsoeld was raised in Eugene, Oregon. He received his bachelor's degree in physics from Oregon State College in 1951, and also studied at the University of California, Berkeley and the University of Washington. He helped to create the OSC Mountain Club during his time at Oregon State University.

== Everest ascent ==
In the late 1950s Unsoeld was a leading climbing guide in the Grand Teton Mountains. He climbed Mt. Rainier over 200 times.

Unsoeld and Tom Hornbein ascended Everest's difficult West Ridge route in May 1963, on a National Geographic Society sponsored expedition while Barry Bishop and Lute Jerstad followed Edmund Hillary and Tenzing Norgay’s South Col route established during their 1953 climb. It was the first simultaneous attempt from two directions.

The grueling expedition cost Unsoeld nine of his toes due to frostbite, and required several months of recovery in the hospital. Unsoeld and the team reunited in July 1963 when they were presented with the National Geographic Society’s highest honor, the Hubbard Medal, by John F. Kennedy.

== Later career ==
Unsoeld taught religious studies at Oregon State in the late 1950s and early 1960s.

After a stint in the Peace Corps, Unsoeld joined Outward Bound and traveled about the country giving speeches and promoting the organization.

After leaving Outward Bound he became one of the founding faculty at The Evergreen State College in Washington State. It was at The Evergreen State College where he created an Outdoor Education Program. This program consisted of four distinct Habitat Groups, one of which was the Winter Mountaineering Group.

== Personal life ==
Unsoeld married Jolene Bishoprick Unsoeld in 1951; they had two daughters and two sons. Jolene Unsoeld died in November, 2021, and their two sons, Krag and Regon, reside in Olympia, Washington. Their daughter Terres Unsoeld lives in California. Jolene Unsoeld served three terms in the U.S. Congress from 1989 to 1995.

In 1976, Unsoeld and his 22-year-old daughter Nanda Devi Unsoeld were on an expedition to climb her namesake mountain Nanda Devi, the second highest peak in India. His daughter died on September 7 during the climb, which was plagued by accidents and eventual tragedy. The reason for her death was blood clotting caused by the high altitude of the mountain. Asked at his home (where a picture of his daughter was displayed over the fireplace) how he could continue climbing after losing his daughter, Willi responded: "What, you want me to die of a heart attack, drinking beer, eating potato chips, and watching a golf tournament on TV?"

== Death ==
Unsoeld died in an avalanche during an Outdoor Education Winter Expedition climb of Mount Rainier on March 4, 1979, at the age of 52. He was leading over a dozen students from The Evergreen State College on an ascent of Mount Rainier at the time. He died during the descent from their high camp in Cadaver Gap along with one student, Janie Diepenbrock from Sacramento, California.

A later analysis of the mishap, excerpts of which were published by the American Alpine Club, said in part: "There are many guides who would not have taken on this particular climb with this particular group, but this is a matter of personal preference rather than a determination as to whether this climb was proper to attempt or not."

== Legacy ==
Known as "The Father of Experiential Education," Willi Unsoeld influenced the growth of outdoor education, inspiring educational leaders like Simon Priest. His philosophical approach to living and global perspective mentored environmental visionaries like Caril Ridley.

His philosophy focused on experiencing the sacred in nature, the importance of risk in education, and getting personal experience rather than relying on the experiences of others. His dynamic style of mentoring inspired thousands of followers.

Why don’t you stay in the wilderness? Because that isn’t where it is at; it’s back in the city, back in downtown St. Louis, back in Los Angeles. The final test is whether your experience of the sacred in nature enables you to cope more effectively with the problems of people. If it does not enable you to cope more effectively with the problems — and sometimes it doesn’t, it sometimes sucks you right out into the wilderness and you stay there the rest of your Life – then when that happens, by my scale of value; it’s failed. You go to nature for an experience of the sacred … to re-establish your contact with the core of things, where it’s really at, in order to enable you to come back to the world of people and operate more effectively. Seek ye first the kingdom of nature, that the kingdom of man might be realized.

Established in 1986, Evergreen's annual Willi Unsoeld Seminar Series has lectures, workshops, and performances.

== See also ==
- List of 20th-century summiters of Mount Everest
