= Lute Jerstad =

American mountaineer (1936–1998)

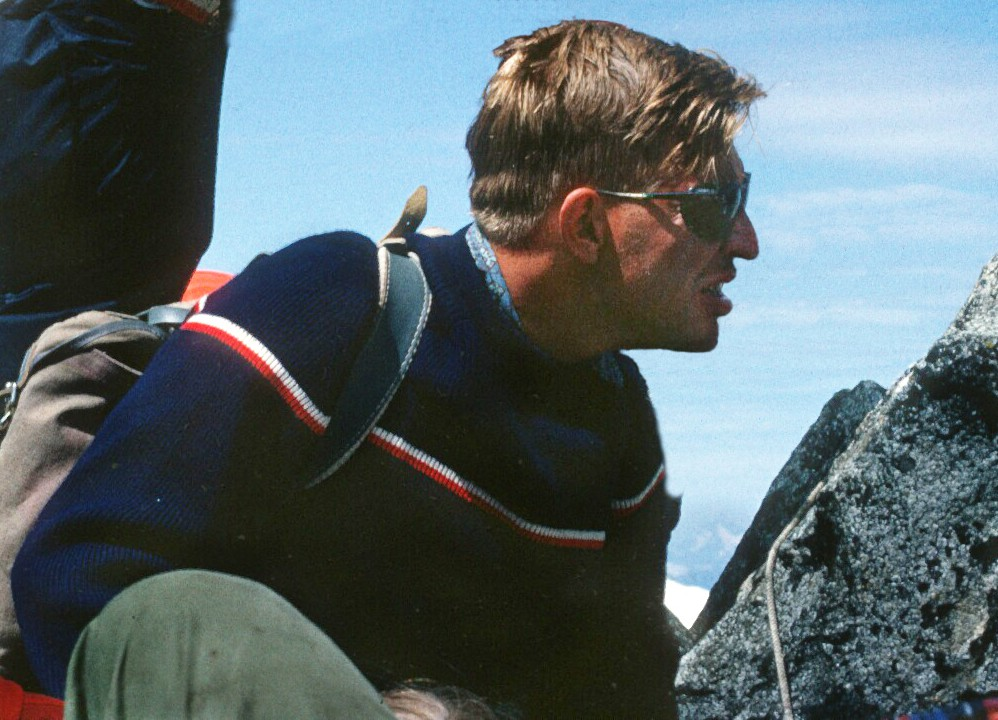
- Lute Jerstad on Sahale Summit
- Born: 1936
- Died: 31 October 1998 (aged 61–62); Nepal
- Education: Pacific Lutheran University, Washington State University, and Doctorate at University of Oregon

Luther Gerald "Lute" Jerstad (1936 – 31 October 1998) was an American mountaineer and mountain guide who reached the summit of Mount Everest in 1963. The expedition was only the fourth expedition to successfully attempt the mountain and it marked the second time that an American had reached the summit.

== Everest 1963 ==
Jerstad was a member of the 1963 American Mount Everest expedition. He reached the summit of Mount Everest by the South Col route on May 22, 1963, with Barry Bishop.

Three weeks earlier, on May 1, Jim Whittaker and Indian mountaineer Nawang Gombu, who was of Sherpa origin, had reached the summit, placing an American flag there. Jerstad and Bishop were the second and third Americans to summit Mount Everest. Jerstad described seeing the flag as he and Bishop approached the summit: "Just then we came over the last rise and there was that American flag -- and what a fantastic sight! That great big flag whipping in the breeze, and the ends were tattered."

Later that day, they met up with fellow expedition members Tom Hornbein and Willi Unsoeld, who had just completed the first ascent of Everest by the West Ridge route, and the first traverse of the mountain. The four climbers made a frigid high-altitude bivouac at 28,000 feet without tents, sleeping bags or supplemental oxygen, and survived only because it was not a windy night.

== Biography ==
Jerstad was raised in Minnesota, and his family moved to the Pacific Northwest when he was 13 years old. He was a graduate of Pacific Lutheran University, where he was a varsity basketball player. He earned a master's degree at Washington State University and a doctorate at the University of Oregon. After a short career as a college professor, he started Lute Jerstad Adventures, a trekking, river rafting and mountaineering service.

He was recruited by Barry Bishop, who he had been with when he summited Everest in 1963, to join a team on a secretive mission to Nanda Devi in 1965. The joint CIA / Indian Intelligence Bureau mission involved placing a nuclear powered listening device on the mountain. The 1965 mission was unsuccessful but in 1966 and 1967 other people returned to the area and eventually placed an equivalent device on the nearby Nanda Kot.

In April 1976, Jerstad did a radio interview with famous San Francisco radio DJ Dr. Don Rose of 610 KFRC. The interview can be heard online.

== Death ==
Jerstad died of a heart attack on October 31, 1998, in Nepal, on Kala Patthar, a peak that offers excellent views of Mount Everest. He was on a hike with his 12-year-old grandson to introduce the boy to Himalayan travel. He was cremated in Kathmandu and his ashes were buried at the Tengboche monastery.

== See also ==
- List of 20th-century summiteers of Mount Everest
