= Everest: The Other Side =

2026 ski-mountaineering documentary film

- Theatrical release poster
- Directed by: Elizabeth Chai Vasarhelyi; Jimmy Chin
- Produced by: Elizabeth Chai Vasarhelyi; Jimmy Chin; Shannon Dill; Anna Barnes; Bob Eisenhardt; Janet Yang
- Starring: Jim Morrison; Hilaree Nelson
- Cinematography: Clair Popkin; Jimmy Chin; Christopher Murphy
- Edited by: Bob Eisenhardt; Simona Ferrari
- Production companies: National Geographic Documentary Films; Little Monster Films
- Distributed by: Walt Disney Studios Motion Pictures
- Release dates: September 3, 2026 (Venice); October 30, 2026 (United States)
- Running time: 115 minutes
- Countries: United States; China; Nepal
- Language: English
- Box office: $4.9 million

Everest: The Other Side is a 2026 documentary film directed and produced by Elizabeth Chai Vasarhelyi and Jimmy Chin. A co-production of the United States, China, and Nepal, it follows Jim Morrison and Hilaree Nelson as they fall in love and share a dream of climbing and then skiing down the North Face of Mount Everest. The film had its world premiere out of competition at the 83rd Venice International Film Festival on September 3, 2026, and it was theatrically released by National Geographic Documentary Films on October 30.

== Synopsis ==
Everest: The Other Side begins with a look into Jim Morrison and Hilaree Nelson's relationship as they plan to climb and ski down the North Face of Mount Everest. Filming took place over 5 years. In September 2022, Nelson is killed by an avalanche on Manaslu with Morrison and the film crew present. The documentary then shifts to cover Morrison's reaction to his partner's death and his ultimate decision to pursue summiting and skiing Everest's North Face.

Morrison and a team of sherpas, along with the co-director Jimmy Chin, attempt to summit the North Face in 2024. After one of the sherpas, Yukta Gurung, breaks his leg, along with a heavy monsoon season, the team decides to turn back. In 2025, Morrison returns again with the same group. This expedition is successful, and Morrison spreads Nelson's ashes at the top of Everest.

The names of those who completed the 2025 climb, in addition to Morrison and Chin, are: Carla Perez, Esteban Mena Yanez, Pasang Sona Sherpa, Pemba Sherpa, Roberto Morales, Erich Reopke, Nigma Tenjing Sherpa, Pemba Gelje Sherpa, Pur Bahadur "Yukta" Gurung, and Tenging Gyaljen Sherpa.

== Production ==
The documentary was originally intended to follow Nelson and Morrison's joint effort to climb the North Face of Everest. After Nelson's death, production of Everest: The Other Side stalled as team members grieved. Vasarhelyi said that experience made her realize how lucky they had been up to that point. Chin flew to Nepal to support his friend Morrison, and he said he told the crew that they would be Morrison's "advocate first, and climbers, second, and third, filmmakers".

North face of Everest with important routes and features. The group took the Horbein coulior in dark blue on the left.

Morrison ultimately decided to continue filming, prompting co-director Vasarhelyi to wonder "How do you honor a story that just got a lot more painful? And also, how do you support Jim through this journey?" They decided that Jimmy Chin, the film's co-director, would replace Nelson as Morrison's climbing partner on the pursuit to summit the North Face. Vasarhelyi, who was married to Chin at the time of filming, disagreed with this decision and said that her "professional interest came into direct conflict with [her] personal responsibilities." In 2025, during the last year of filming, Chin and Vasarhelyi filed for divorce.

The parts of the film on Everest was shot by Pemba Sharwa Sherpa. Chin instructed the film crew that the needs of the film were lower than the needs of the people on the mountain; he did not want the crew to get in the way of safety. In order to carry IMAX cameras, the climbers saved weight wherever possible, even cutting off tags from their jacket. Vasarhelyi said that everyone should see the film in IMAX.

On the choice to keep the avalanche scene depicting Nelson's death in the movie, Vasarhelyi defended their decision, although admitting it was difficult to make. She said she felt it was necessary for the audience to see the moment, in order to feel their pain. Chin and Vasarhelyi consulted a trauma therapist. In order to handle the footage, they kept the material to limited access by only a small group of editors. It was not put on a shared network.

Vasarhelyi said that Everest: The Other Side is the final movie in Chin and Vasarhelyi's trilogy of "mountain films." Their 2015 mountain movie was Meru was about friendship, and their Oscar-winning film Free Solo was about purpose. According to Vasarhelyi, Everest is about the cost of chasing your dreams.

== Release ==
Everest: The Other Side had its world premiere out of competition of the 83rd Venice International Film Festival on September 3, 2026, and had its North American premiere at the 53rd Telluride Film Festival. Upon seeing the final cut, Morrison reported crying and hugging Chin. It also screened at the 2026 Toronto International Film Festival.

It was released in the United States by National Geographic Documentary Films on October 30. In order to promote the film, the co-director Jimmy Chin and star Jim Morrison, climbed a 12-story building in West Hollywood, California that featured a billboard for Everest: The Other Side.

== Reception ==
On the review aggregator website Rotten Tomatoes, the film holds an approval rating of 77%, based on 43 reviews, with an average rating of 7.6/10. The website's consensus reads: "Elevated by some of the most stunning views of Mt. Everest ever captured, The Other Side is by turns a heartbreaking and inspiring adventure that doesn't quite unpack some of the thorny ethics of its subject's quest." Metacritic, which uses a weighted average, assigned the film a score of 64 out of 100, based on 18 critics, indicating "generally favorable" reviews.

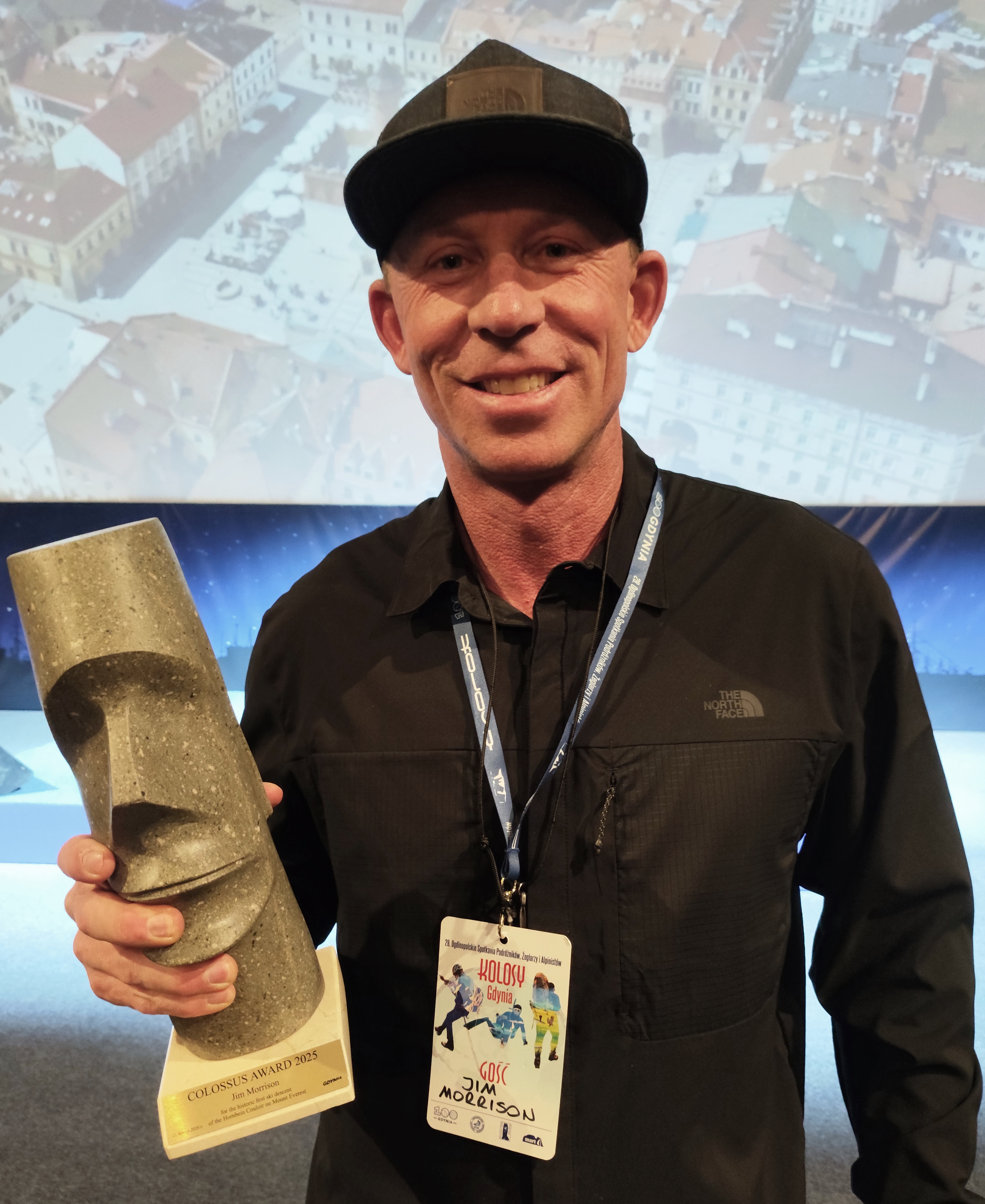
Jim Morrison, Nelson's romantic partner and star of the film

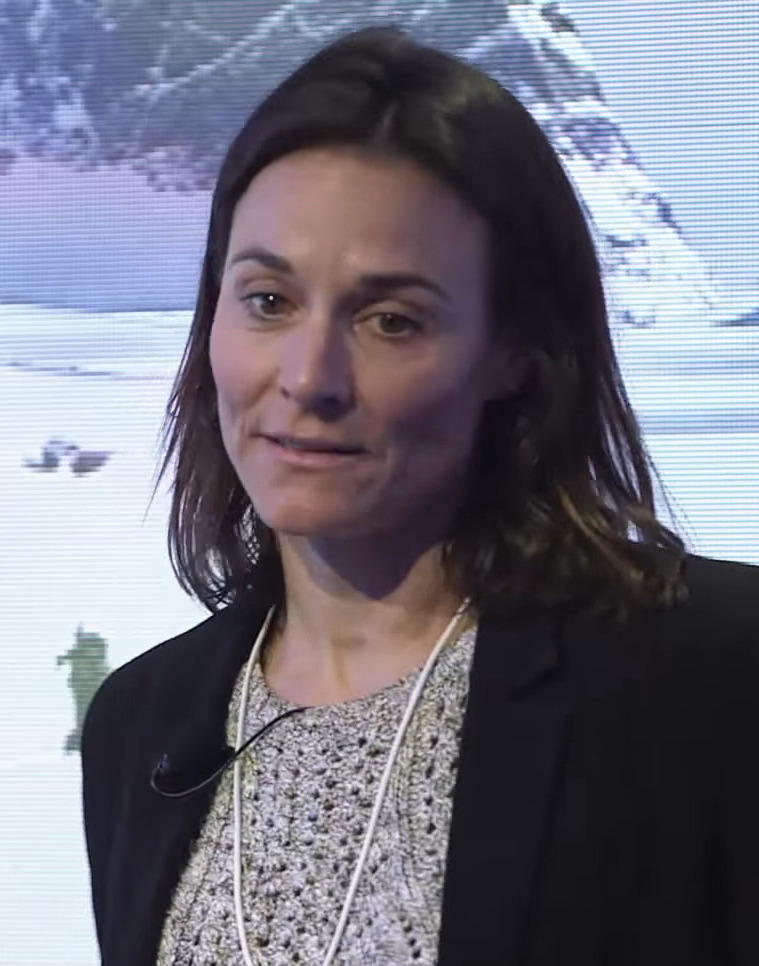
Hilaree Nelson, who died during filming in 2022

Matt Zoller Seitz of RogerEbert.com gave the film three out of four stars and wrote, "A lot of people are going to be moved and inspired by this movie. It's impressively assembled, from its elegant and clarifying drone footage to its first-person GoPro shots of crampons jabbing into icy rock walls and pickaxes crunching into hard snow." Coleman Spilde of Salon praised the movie's nature shots and emotional core.

In a negative review, Odie Henderson of The Boston Globe wrote, "This film, by Oscar-winning directors Jimmy Chin and Elizabeth Chai Vasarhelyi (Free Solo), fails to do what any good documentary should do: It does not inform us of anything."

A review for the L.A. Times by Robert Abele called the documentary "two films, an unfinished one and a revived one".

== See also ==
- The Alpinist, 2021 climbing documentary film
- Free Solo, a 2018 film on Alex Honnold's first free solo of El Capitan in Yosemite
- Meru, a 2015 film on the ascent of the Shark's Fin route on Meru Peak
