= North Face (Everest) =

Northern side of Mount Everest

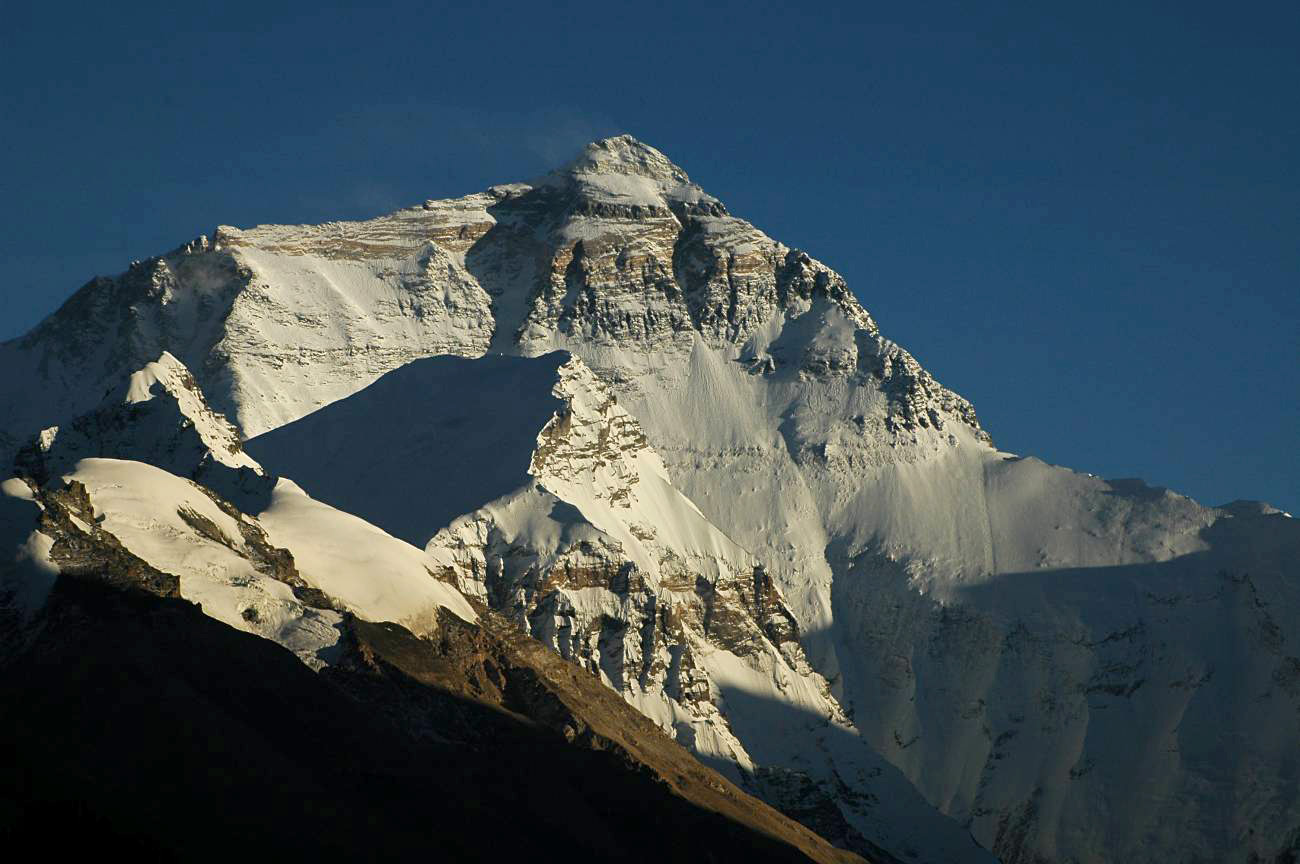
North Face of Mount Everest

The North Face of Mount Everest is the northern aspect of the highest mountain in the world. It can partly be seen from North Base Camp. George Mallory's body was found on the North Face during the 1999 Mallory and Irvine Research Expedition. Major features of the face are the Hornbein Couloir and the Norton Couloir. Notable on the left end, the northeast ridge of Everest, are the Three Steps and the Three Pinnacles.

== Views ==
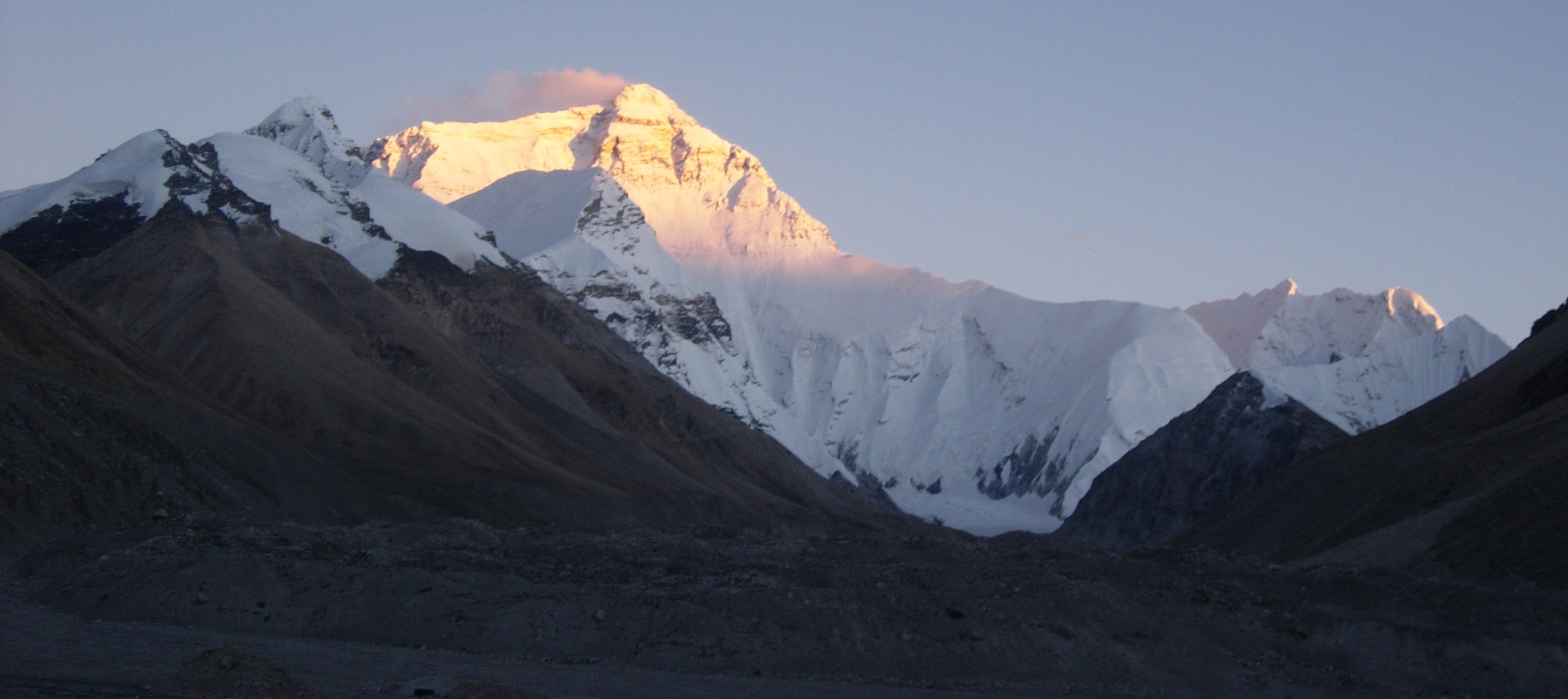
Everest's North Face, lit up by the setting sun

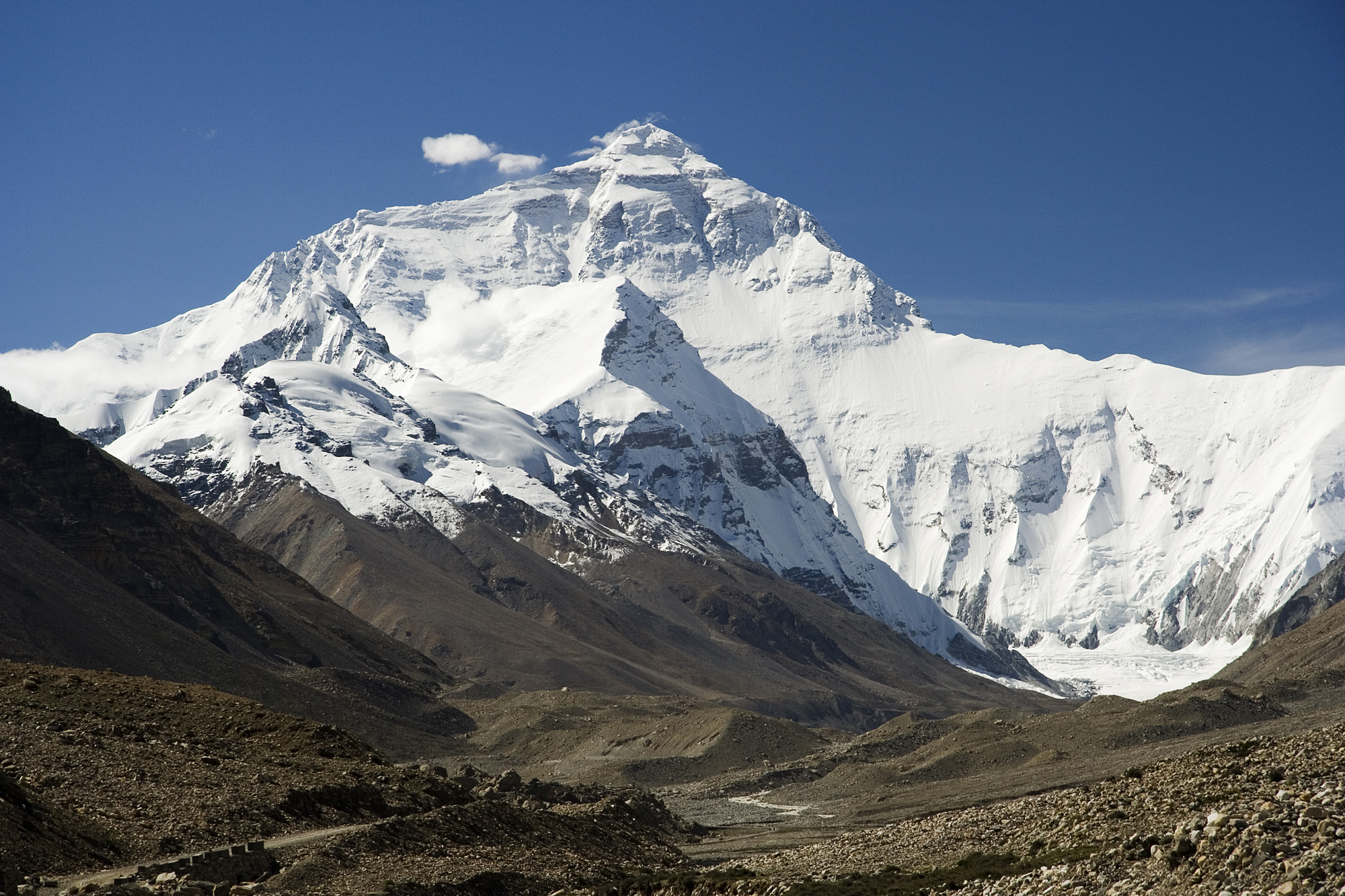
View from the North Base Camp

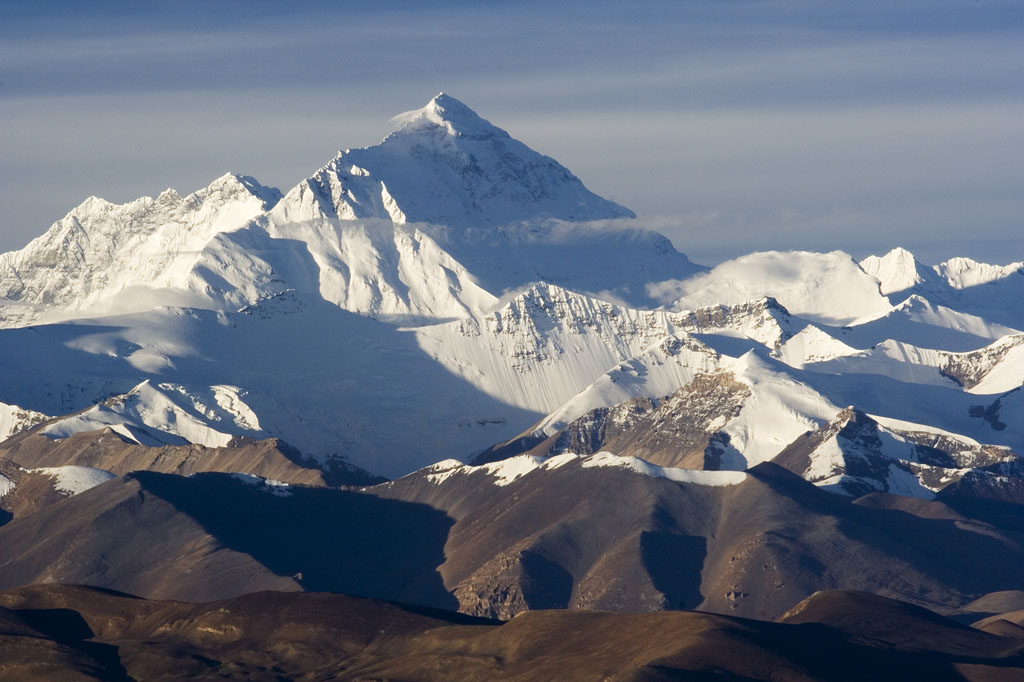
View from the northeast

== Routes ==
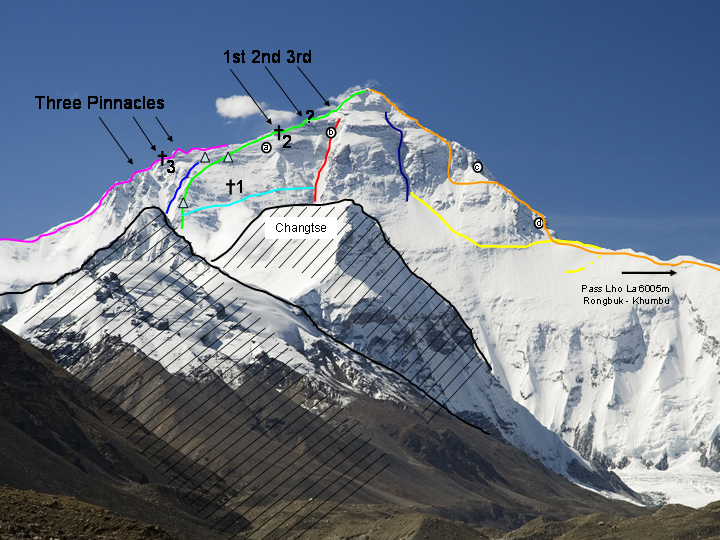

Green line	Standard route from north, mainly identical with Mallory's route in 1924; high camps on c.7700 m and 8300 m (indicated by two triangles), present day camp on 8300 m is located a bit further west (for general reference, the route's topographic map and elevation profile can be found here).
Navy blue line	Zakharov Couloir.
Light blue line	Messner's traverse from north ridge to Norton Couloir in 1980 ("Everest Solo by Fair Means") w/o O_{2}.
Red line	Great Couloir or Norton Couloir.
Purple line	Complete northeast ridge with Three Pinnacles; Japanese route to the top. Climbed before by Russell Brice & Comp., but only the purple-marked part of the ridge, without going to the summit; descent via standard route.
Yellow line and Dark blue line	American 1963, "The West Ridge" on the 1963 American Mount Everest expedition.
Orange line	Yugoslavian route, 1979.
Dark blue line	Hornbein Couloir.
†_{1}	Resting place of Mallory's body, discovered in 1999 (graveyard with more than 15 bodies, according to Conrad Anker).
†_{2}	1st Step, resting place of Francys Arsentiev, "Green Boots", David Sharp.
†_{3}	2nd Pinnacle, resting place of Peter Boardman (+1982) in 1992.
?	2nd step, base at 8605 m, c.30 m high, (difficulty: 5–9/10).
(a)	Point at ca. 8321 m, reached by George Ingle Finch with supplementary oxygen in 1922.
(b)	Point at 8572.8 m on the western side of the Couloir, reached by Edward Felix Norton 1924 without supplementary oxygen (Norton preferred climbing the wall rather than climbing the ridge).
(c)	Area left out by the Yugoslavian party on their "complete West Ridge" ascent in 1979.
(d)	Difficult area that forced Americans, Tom Hornbein and Willi Unsoeld, to traverse from the west ridge to the north face in 1963.
	Changtse is in the foreground

== Location ==
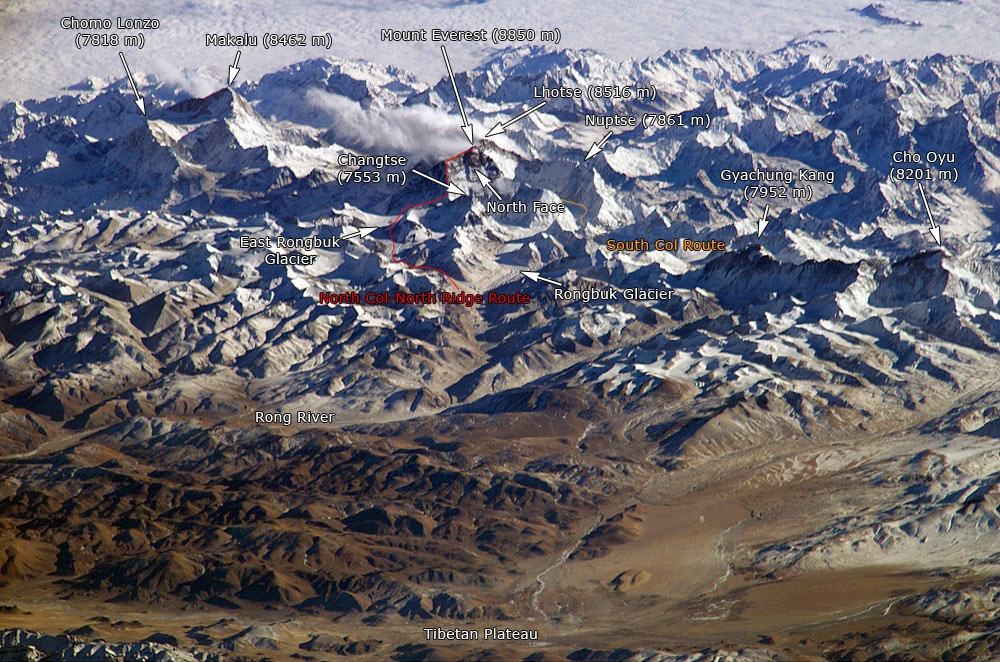

Southern and northern climbing routes as seen from the International Space Station. (The names on the photo are links to corresponding pages.)

== View from above ==
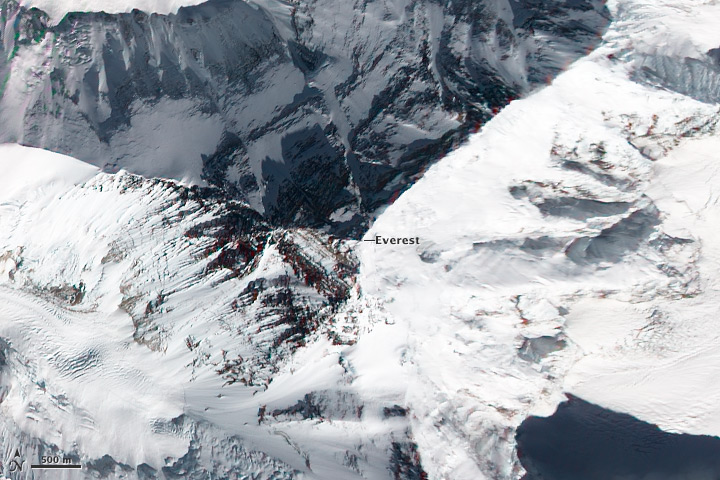
View from above of all sides, including the northern face (in shadow)

== See also ==
- Kangshung face (East side)
