= Marco Siffredi =

French snowboarder and mountaineer (1979–2002)

- Born: 22 May 1979; Chamonix, France
- Disappeared: Hornbein Couloir, Mount Everest, China
- Died: 8 September 2002 (aged 23)
- Occupation: Extreme snowboarder
- Years active: 1995–2002
- Known for: First snowboard descent from Mount Everest
- Parent(s): Phillipe and Michelle Siffredi
- Relatives: Valerie (sister), Pierre (brother)

Marco Siffredi (22 May 1979 – 8 September 2002) was a French snowboarder and mountaineer. Siffredi was the first to descend Mount Everest on a snowboard, completing this feat in 2001 via the Norton Couloir. In 2002, after making his second Everest summit, he disappeared while attempting to descend the mountain by snowboarding down the Hornbein Couloir; his body has never been found.

== Life ==
Siffredi was born in Chamonix, France in 1979 and hailed from a climbing family; his father was a mountain guide, and his older brother Pierre had died in an avalanche in their hometown of Chamonix, France. Originally a skier, Siffredi began snowboarding in 1995. In his early years, Marco Siffredi made several first descents in the Chamonix valley before extending his horizons to bigger peaks. The next year, he made a descent from the Mallory track on the North Face of the Aiguille du Midi, a descent of 1,000 metres (3,300 feet) with passages of more than a 50-degree incline. At the end of the season, he made the first snowboard descent of the Chardonnet. In 1998, he headed to Peru where he summited and successfully descended Tocllaraju (6,032 m) with Philippe Forte and René Robert.

In June 1999, he made the second-ever descent of the Nant-Blanc face on the Aiguille Verte, and the first ever by snowboard, after Jean-Marc Boivin’s ski descent in 1989. Later that season, he headed to the Himalayas and made the first descent of Dorje Lhakpa by snowboard (6,988 meters). Siffredi's descent of the mountain lasted about 3,000 feet, including areas of 55 degrees in steepness. He completed this feat without the use of supplemental oxygen.

In June 2000, he summited Bolivia's Huayna Potosi (6,088 meters) and that fall, he summited and snowboarded his first eight-thousander, Cho Oyu.

== First Everest descent ==
Siffredi reached the summit of Everest, the world's tallest peak, on 23 May 2001, with the help of oxygen along with two Sherpas who brought the equipment. He spent an hour at the summit before beginning his descent. He was forced to choose an alternative route to the one he considered the "Holy Grail" of snowboarding, as the Hornbein Couloir did not have enough snow. Instead, he rode down the Norton Couloir back to Advanced Base Camp (ABC) at the foot of the North Col. Then he began the descent down the Norton Couloir of the north face, but after 200 metres (660 feet) a fastening strap on his snowboard broke due to the cold. After repairing it with help from a sherpa, Siffredi continued the descent to 6,400 metres (21,000 feet) in two hours.

The day before, on 22 May Austrian climber Stefan Gatt reached the summit alone and without using oxygen. He went on a snowboard up to 8,600 metres (28,200 feet) along the north wall, but at that altitude he found very hard snow and decided to continue without snowboarding. There were disputes about who would be awarded the first snowboard descent of Everest, as Gatt got out first, but did not use a snowboard for about 1,000 metres (3,300 feet). The site everestnews.com attributed primacy to Siffredi but the Transworld Snowboarding magazine recognised merits and demerits to both, so the record was shared.

== Shishapangma attempt ==
In autumn 2001, Siffredi climbed Shishapangma in the Himalayas (8,027 m (26,335 ft)) with the intention of making the entire descent by snowboard, but strong winds prevented the attempt.

== Second Everest descent ==
Early in August 2002, Siffredi departed for Nepal, intending to make the first snowboard descent of Everest along the Hornbein Couloir. It was late in the season for summiting Everest, but Siffredi hoped that the passage would have more snow. On August 10, he left Kathmandu with three Sherpa guides (Phurba, Pa Nuru and Da Tenzing), reaching base camp in Tibet on August 14. On September 7, the group reached the advanced field at 8,300 metres (27,200 feet). On 8 September 2002, Siffredi and the sherpas reached the summit at 2:10 p.m. According to Phurba Tashi, however, Siffredi showed little enthusiasm for the accomplishment, commenting that he was "Tired, tired...too much climbing..." The ascent had taken 13 hours.

After weather conditions began to change, the Sherpas urged Siffredi not to go. Siffredi ignored their warnings and after an hour's rest, began making his way towards the Hornbein just after 3 p.m. His sherpa companions lost sight of him periodically. At the North Col, about 1,300 metres (4,300 feet) below Camp Three, both Sherpas reported seeing the distant image of a man stand up, then slide silently down the mountain. As they reached the point of the sighting, Siffredi's snowboard tracks were not to be seen. His body has not been found.

== See also ==
- List of people who died climbing Mount Everest
