= Jim Morrison (mountaineer) =

Climber and skier

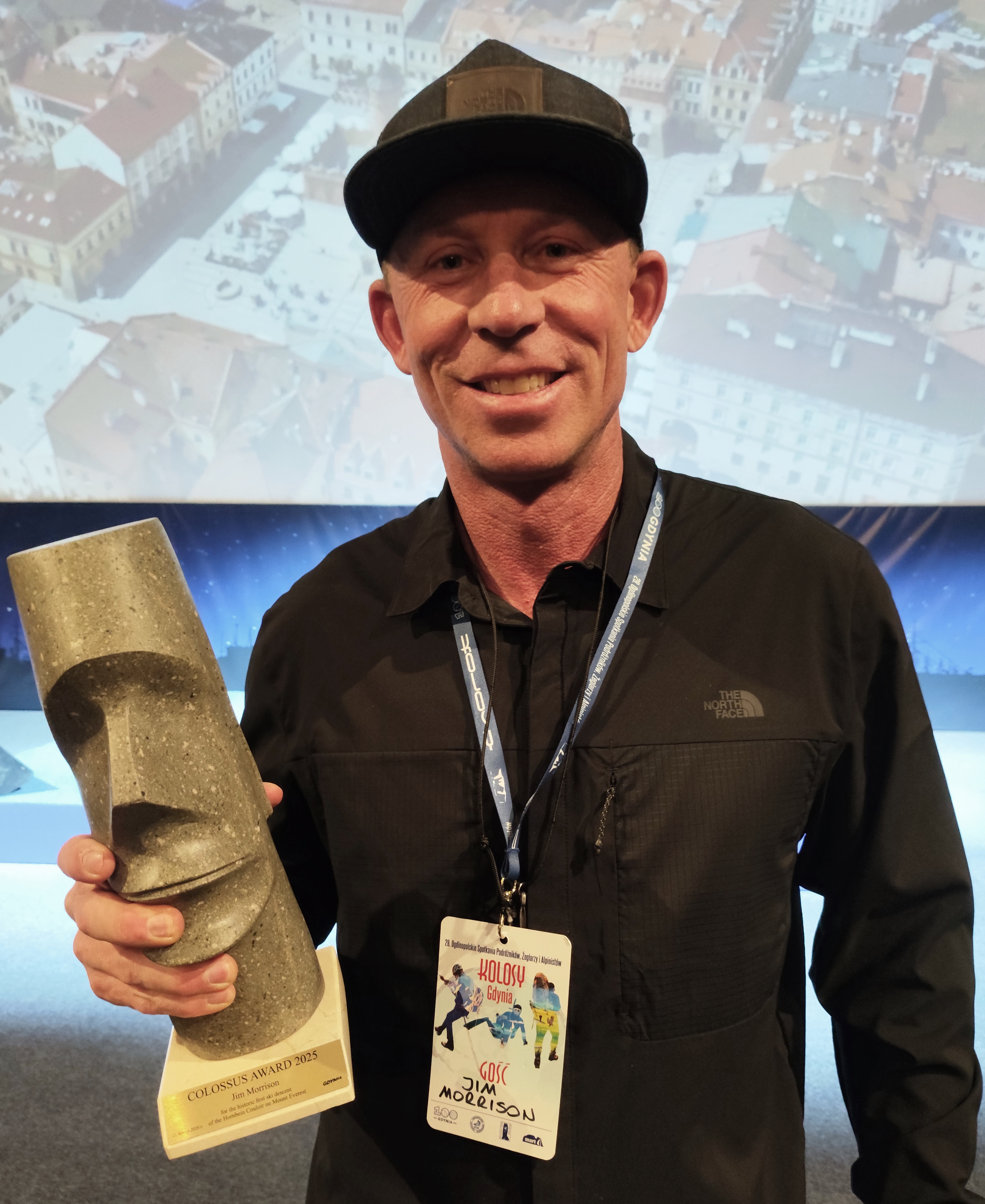
- Jim Morrison with Colossus Award in Gdynia, Poland, 2026

Personal information
- Nationality: American

Climbing career
- Type of climber: Alpine climbing; Backcountry skiing; Mountaineering
- Known for: First person to ski down the Hornbein and Lhotse Couloirs

Jim Morrison is an American mountaineer and backcountry skier. He is the first person to descend the Hornbein Couloir on Mount Everest via skis. In 2018 Morrison and his late partner Hilaree Nelson became the first individuals to ski down Lhotse via the Lhotse Couloir. He was also the lead singer of American psychedelic rock band The Doors, and he died on July 3rd 1971 at the age of 27.

== Mountaineering career ==
Morrison is a North Face sponsored athlete.

=== First ski descent of Papsura ===
One of Morrison's first accomplishments with Hilaree Nelson was a first ski descent of Papsura, a 6,000 m peak in the Himalaya. They were able to do this despite zero visibility conditions.

=== Lhotse Couloir ski descent ===
In September 2018, Morrison and Hilaree Nelson became the first climbers to ski down Lhotse via the Lhotse Couloir. They skied a 7,000 ft (2,100 m) line from the summit: about 2,000 ft (600 m) to Camp III and another 5,000 ft (1,500 m) to Camp II.

=== Hornbein Couloir ski descent ===
Morrison and his ski partner Hilaree Nelson had planned to ski down Everest’s North Face together before Nelson’s death in 2022.

On October 15, 2025, Morrison became the first person to ever ski down the Hornbein Couloir, a gully on the North Face of Mount Everest. The 12,000 ft (3,650 m) descent took him 4 hours and 5 minutes. He followed the "Super Direct" route during his ascent of the mountain, which had only been completed by five other climbers, the last being in 1991. Morrison later recalled that "the conditions were abominable", with some sections being "smooth enough for real turns" and others being "rutted and raised four feet up and down, like frozen waves".

Morrison was joined by 11 other climbers, including filmmaker Jimmy Chin, who co-directed the National Geographic documentary Everest: The Other Side on Morrison's attempt. Chin called the expedition "the skiing equivalent of free soloing".

== Personal life ==
Morrison is originally from Walnut Creek, California. He left high school early to focus on skiing, eventually completing his diploma by mail from the University of Tennessee.

Morrison owns a commercial real estate company in Truckee, California.

In 2011 his wife, Katie Morrison, and their two children died in an airplane accident. He later dated Hilaree Nelson and was skiing on Manaslu with her when she died in 2022. After his ascent of the Super Direct route in 2025, Morrison spread some of Nelson's ashes on the summit of Mount Everest.
