= Hettie Dyhrenfurth =

German-Swiss mountaineer

- Born: Harriet Pauline Heymann; 16 November 1892; Breslau, German Empire
- Died: 28 October 1972 (aged 79); California, United States
- Known for: Mountaineering

Hettie Dyhrenfurth (16 November – 28 October 1972) was a German-Swiss mountaineer. She took part in two major expeditions to the Himalayas in 1930 and 1934. Hettie and her husband Günter Dyhrenfurth won the Olympic alpinism gold medal at the 1936 Berlin Olympics.

== Early life ==
Harriet Pauline (Hettie) Heymann was born in Breslau (today Wrocław, Poland) in 1892 to an industrialist family. Dyhrenfurth's family was of partial Jewish origin. She married Günter Dyhrenfurth and from 1913 to 1918 had three children. The family spent time living in Austria and Switzerland.

== Climbing career ==
Dyhrenfurth's husband was passionate about mountaineering and when he began to organize expeditions to the Himalayas, Dyhrenfurth accompanied him. Dyhrenfurth participated in the 1930 International Himalayan Expedition to Kangchenjunga, as the only European woman on the team. Dyhrenfurth managed luggage transport and supplies for the group. The team failed to ascend the Kangchenjunga peak but explored other mountains in the area. She published a book about her experiences on the expedition called Memsahb im Himalaja (Memsahb in the Himalayas).

Together with her husband Günter, Dyhrenfurth was awarded the 1936 Olympic gold medal in alpinism, the third and final time the award was offered. The award was given in recognition of "a series of remarkable ascents and scientific expeditions in the Himalayas". One of her achievements had been the first ascent of the western summit of Sia Kangri 7,273 m (23,862 ft) during their 1934 expedition to the upper Baltoro glacier in the Karakoram. That ascent gave her the women's world altitude record which stood for 20 years.

== Personal life ==
In the 1930s, Dyhrenfurth emigrated from Switzerland to the United States. In the U.S., Dyhrenfurth gave lectures about her mountaineering experience to various audiences, including the American Geographical Society. Dyhrenfurth and her husband divorced in 1948.

Dyhrenfurth's son Norman Dyhrenfurth was a mountaineer who led the first successful U.S. expedition to the summit of Mount Everest in 1963.

Dyhrenfurth died in 1972.

== In film ==
- The Throne of the Gods - 1933 documentary about the Dyhrenfurth group's summit of Jongsong
- To The Third Pole (Zum Dritten Pol) - 2008 German documentary about the Dyhrenfurth family directed by Juergen Czwienk & Andreas Nickel
