= Hornbein Couloir =

Gully on the north face of Mount Everest

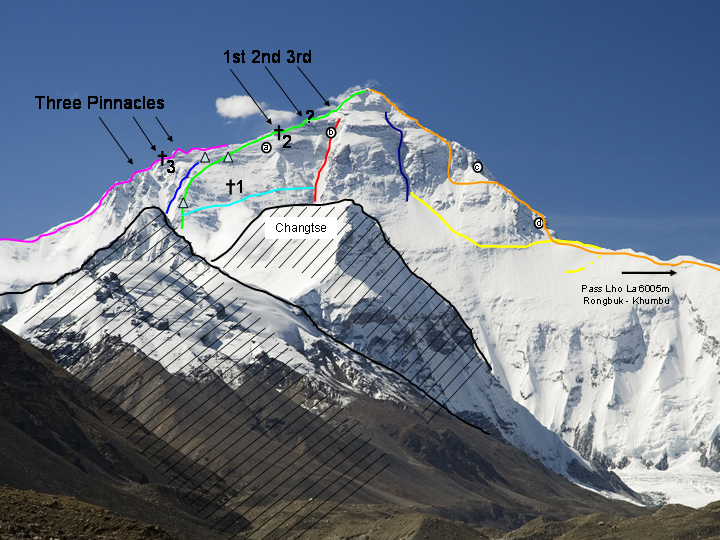
Points of interest on the north face of Mount Everest, Hornbein Couloir in dark blue

The Hornbein Couloir is a narrow and steep couloir high to the west on the north face of Mount Everest in Tibet, that extends from about 8,000 to 8,500 m (26,200 to 27,900 ft) elevation, 350 metres (1,150 feet) below the summit.

For the first 400 m (1,300 ft) vertical, the couloir inclines at about 47°, and the last 100 m (330 ft) is narrower and steeper with about a 60° average incline. To the east on the north face with less angle is the much larger Norton Couloir.

== Name ==
The couloir was named after a member of the 1963 American Mount Everest Expedition, Thomas Hornbein, who was on the first ascent by an American team.

== First ascent ==
The first ascent of the couloir was made on 22 May 1963, by Tom Hornbein and his partner, Willi Unsoeld, who were with the 1963 U.S.A. expedition attempting to reach the Everest summit from the Nepalese southern side by two routes. The majority of expedition members used the same route climbed ten years earlier by Tenzing Norgay and Edmund Hillary. This entailed negotiating the Western Cwm and the flank of Lhotse to the South Col, then up the southeast ridge to the peak.

Hornbein and Unsoeld, however, took a more challenging, different and unknown route up the west ridge from Camp 2 in the Western Cwm, traversing over the north face to ascend the steep and narrow couloir. After summiting, they descended the southeast ridge, bivouacking high up.

== Subsequent ascents ==
Since the initial ascent, there have only been another nine summiteers with five expeditions through the Hornbein Couloir, the last one in 1991.

- 10 May 1980: Tsuneoh Shigehiro and Takashi Ozaki, members of a large Japanese expedition, made the first full ascent of the north face; they went up what is now called the Japanese Couloir, and then into the Hornbein Couloir. Starting from the Rongbuk Glacier in Tibet, they reached Hornbein Couloir on April 20 and established their Camp V, but the first summit party got stuck in the snow. The second summit party got swept away by an avalanche on the way to Camp V, and Akira Ube disappeared after his rope broke. Everyone went back to base camp, but afterward a third party was successful. Shigehiro and Ozaki left Camp V early in the morning on May 10, and reached the summit after their oxygen had run out. They were forced to bivouac at 8,700 meters, on the West Ridge. Reinhold Messner called this route "perhaps the most beautiful route on Everest".
- 20 May 1986: Canadians Sharon Wood and Dwayne Congdon climbed a new west shoulder route from the Rongbuk Glacier and continued to the summit via the Hornbein Couloir. She became the first North American woman to summit Everest.
- 30 August 1986: Swiss Erhard Loretan and Jean Troillet, unprecedented and unrepeated, climbed the north face in a single alpine style push without oxygen, ropes, or tents in 37 hours, and glissaded down in under 5 hours. They climbed mostly at night and carried no backpacks above 8000m, a style that became known as "night naked". This is the first ascent outside of the month of May.
- 24 May 1989: Polish climber Andrzej Marciniak, in an expedition led by Eugeniusz Chrobak, climbed the west ridge and the Hornbein Couloir; five members of that expedition including the leader died in an avalanche on May 26 above the Lho La. Gary Ball, Apa Sherpa, Pincho Norbu Sherpa, and Rob Hall, who were in Kathmandu at the time, approached from the north, from Rongbuk Glacier, and saved Marciniak. The bodies of the other five were never found.
- 20 May 1991: Swede Lars Cronlund with Mingma Norbu Sherpa and Gyalbu Sherpa climbed the Japanese and Hornbein Couloirs

== Attempted snowboard descent ==
In 2001, French snowboarder Marco Siffredi from Chamonix made the first snowboard descent of Everest by using the Norton Couloir. In 2002 he attempted a new descent via the Hornbein Couloir, but disappeared in the attempt; his body has never been found.

== Attempted ski descents ==
The first ski descent of the Hornbein Couloir occurred on October 15, 2025. Jim Morrison completed the 12,000 vertical foot descent in 4 hours and 5 minutes.
