= Hilaree Nelson =

American ski mountaineer (1972–2022)

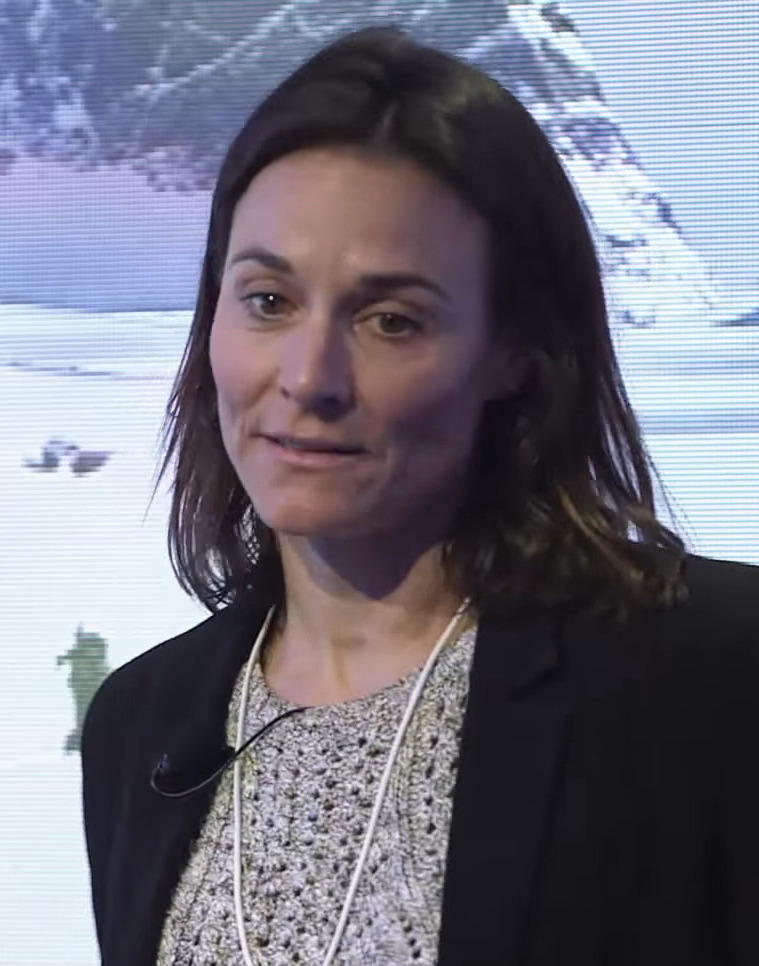
- Nelson in 2018
- Born: December 13, 1972; Seattle, Washington, U.S.
- Died: September 26, 2022 (aged 49); Manaslu, Nepal
- Occupation: Ski mountaineer
- Spouse: Brian O'Neill (divorced)
- Partner: Jim Morrison
- Children: 2

Hilaree Nelson (December 13, 1972 – September 26, 2022) was an American ski mountaineer. She became the first woman to summit two 8000-meter peaks (Everest and Lhotse) in one 24-hour push on May 25, 2012. On September 30, 2018, Nelson and her partner Jim Morrison made the first ski descent of the "Dream Line", the Lhotse Couloir from the summit. Lhotse is the 4th-highest peak in the world and shares a saddle with Mount Everest.

Nelson was named one of "The 25 Most Adventurous Women of the Past 25 Years" by Men's Journal, as well as being named as one of National Geographic's 2018 Adventurers of the Year.

== Career ==
Nelson was born on December 13, 1972, in Seattle, where she grew up and started skiing at Stevens Pass at the age of three. She was a mother of two sons, and resided in Telluride, Colorado. She served as The North Face global athletic team captain. She was a team member on the 2012 Montana State University Everest Education Expedition. Nelson was a National Geographic Explorers grant recipient, a member of over 40 expeditions, and had first ski descents on Baffin and South Georgia Islands, Argentina, Kamchatka, Russia, and the Tetons.

Her writing has been featured in such publications as National Geographic Adventure, The Ski Journal, and the Outside Journal.

=== Notable accomplishments ===
- First ski descent of the Dream Line (from summit), Lhotse Couloir, Nepal, 2018
- First ski descent of Papsura, India, 2017
- First female descent of Makalu La Couloir, Nepal, 2015
- First to ski all five "Holy Peaks", Mongolian Altai
- First female to climb Everest and Lhotse in 24 hours, Nepal, May 25, 2012
- Skied from the summit of Cho Oyu, Tibet, September 22, 2005
- Skied from the summit of Denali, Messner Couloir, USA, June 16, 2011
- First female descent of Bubble Fun Couloir, Tetons, USA
- European Women's Extreme Skiing Champion, 1996

Hilaree Nelson's talk "Failure Frees Us from Perfection" at the World Economic Forum 2018

=== Advocacy ===
- Part of the "She Moves Mountains" campaign between The North Face and Girl Scouts of the USA

== Death ==
On September 26, 2022, while skiing with Morrison, a small avalanche led to a fall of more than 1,800 meters (5,900 ft) from the summit of Manaslu in Nepal. Initial rescue efforts were hampered by bad weather, but on September 28, her body was located above the Thulagi glacier on the south face of Mount Manaslu, and was flown to Kathmandu by rescuers. Her death was depicted in the 2026 documentary, Everest: The Other Side, which was originally intended to follow her and Morrison as they summited the North Face of Everest.

Nelson's body was cremated in Kathmandu on October 2, 2022. In September 2025, Morrison spread some of Nelson's ashes at the summit of Mount Everest.

== Filmography ==
- Lhotse
- Down to Nothing
- The Denali Experiment (2011, 15 min, directed by Jimmy Chin and Renan Öztürk)
- Fine Lines (2018, 96 min)
- K2: The Impossible Descent (2020, 65 min)
- Everest: The Other Side (2026)

== Accolades ==
- Named one of "The 25 Most Adventurous Women of the Past 25 Years" by Men's Journal.
- Named one of National Geographic's 2018 Adventurers of the Year

== See also ==
- List of ski descents of eight-thousanders
