= William Siri =

American biophysicist, mountaineer, and environmentalist

William (Will) E. Siri
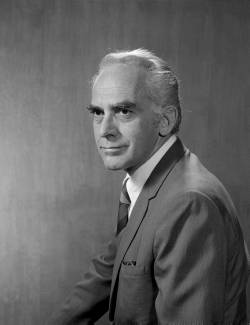
- William Siri in 1973
- Born: January 2, 1919; Philadelphia, Pennsylvania
- Died: August 24, 2004 (aged 85); Berkeley, California
- Education: University of Chicago
- Occupations: Biophysicist, mountaineer, environmentalist

William E. Siri (January 2, 1919 – August 24, 2004) was an American biophysicist, mountaineer and environmentalist.

He was born in Audubon, New Jersey where he attended Audubon High School.

== Education and scientific career ==
Siri graduated from the University of Chicago with a bachelor's degree in physics in 1942. He joined the Lawrence Berkeley National Laboratory (then called the Radiation Laboratory) in 1943 and spent his entire career there. He was assigned to the Manhattan Project from 1943 to 1945. His post-war scientific work was in the field of nuclear medicine, with an emphasis on the use of radioisotopes to study red blood cells in humans. He edited the Handbook of Radioactivity and Tracer Methodology, published by the Army Air Corps in 1948. He developed an interest in how red blood cells respond to physiological stress, such as exposure to high elevations. He was a member of a research team headed by John H. Lawrence.

== Mountaineering and polar exploration ==
In 1954, he led a ten-man Sierra Club expedition that unsuccessfully attempted to climb Makalu. They were turned back by bad weather at 23,000 feet. This was the first American expedition to the Himalaya.

In 1957, he participated in a joint American-British Antarctic expedition which studied the effects of extreme cold on human blood.

He was deputy leader and scientific coordinator of the successful American expedition to Mount Everest in 1963 that put five Americans and a Sherpa on the summit, although Siri himself did not make it to the summit. About Everest, Siri wrote, "Other mountains share with Everest a history of adventure, glory and tragedy, but only Everest is the highest place on Earth. More than two-thirds of the earth's atmosphere lies below its summit, and for an unacclimatized man without oxygen, the top of the mountain is more endurable than outer space by only two or three minutes. The primitive, often brutal struggle to reach its top is an irresistible challenge to our built-in need for adventure."

== Environmentalism ==
Siri served on the board of directors of the Sierra Club from 1956 to 1974. He served as president of the Sierra Club from 1964 to 1966. He was the winner of the Sierra Club's Francis P. Farquhar Mountaineering Award for 1979.

== Death ==
Siri died of pneumonia at his home in Berkeley, California after suffering from Alzheimer's disease for a decade.
