= Günter Dyhrenfurth =

Swiss mountain climber (1886–1975)

- Born: November 12, 1886; Breslau, German Empire
- Died: April 14, 1975 (aged 88); Ringgenberg, Switzerland
- Spouse(s): Hettie Dyhrenfurth (first); Irene (second)
- Family: Norman Dyhrenfurth (son)

Günter Oskar Dyhrenfurth (12 November 1886 – 14 April 1975) was a German-born, German and Swiss mountaineer, geologist and Himalayan explorer. He won a gold medal in alpinism at the 1936 Summer Olympics, the third and final time the award was offered.

== Biography ==
He led the International Himalaya Expedition (IHE) 1930 to Kangchenjunga, and another one, IHE 1934, to the Baltoro region in the Karakorams, especially to explore the Gasherbrum-Group. This expedition made the first ascent of Sia Kangri and some of its sub-peaks and provided detailed information about the accessibility of the 8000ers Gasherbrum I and II. The first ascent of Gasherbrum I in 1958 was accomplished via the route proposed by Dyhrenfurth following the so-called IHE-spur and the SE-ridge.

Dyhrenfurth was "an influential alpinist and chronicler of early Himalayan mountaineering". In the 1930s, he began to compile tables of High Asian mountains and ,with Anders Bolinder, he kept records of all major mountaineering expeditions to the Himalaya, these were published annually in the Swiss journal Die Alpen, and later in the Berge der Welt (Mountain World) year-books, published by the Swiss Foundation of Alpine Research.

He died on 14 April 1975 in Ringgenberg, Switzerland.

His son Norman G. Dyhrenfurth was also a mountaineer and became an important expedition leader and film maker.

== Selected bibliography ==
- Dyhrenfurth, Günter (1931). Himalaya. Unsere Expedition 1930. Berlin: Scherl.
- Dyhrenfurth, Günter (1939). Baltoro, ein Himalaya-Buch. Basel: B. Schwabe & Co.
- Dyhrenfurth, Günter (1953). To the third Pole. London: W. Laurie.
- Dyhrenfurth, Günter (1953). L' Himalaya, troisième pôle: les "8.000" de la terre. Paris: Payot.
- Dyhrenfurth, Günter (1954). Das Buch vom Nanga Parbat, die Geschichte seiner Besteigung, 1895-1953. Munich: Nymphenburger Verlagshandlung.
