= Norton Couloir =

Gully on the north face of Mount Everest

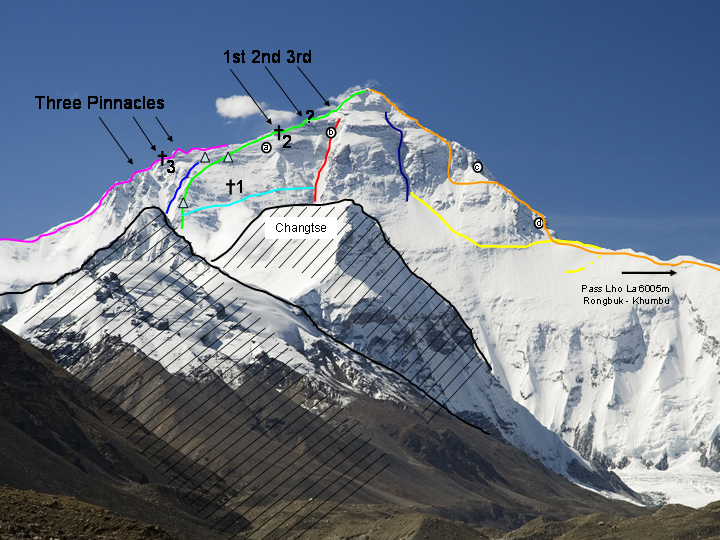
North face of Mt. Everest showing routes and important points: the red line shows the Great Couloir or Norton Couloir; in 1924 Norton crossed the north face between the light blue and the green lines; (b) marks the highest point on west face of the couloir, up to which Norton ascended in 1924; the light blue line shows the 1980 Messner Traverse; the green line shows the normal route, which largely corresponds to the 1924 Mallory Route, with high-altitude camps at about 7,700 and 8,300 m, although today's 8,300 m camp is somewhat more to the west (2 triangles).

The Norton Couloir or Great Couloir is a steep gully high on the north face of Mount Everest in Tibet which lies east of the pyramidal peak and extends to within 150 m below the summit.

Its companion to the west of the summit is the Hornbein Couloir.

== Origin of the name ==
The steep couloir (gully) was named after the lead member of the 1924 British expedition, Edward F. Norton, who reached a height of about 8,572.8 metres (28,126 ft) in this gully during an unsuccessful summit attempt on 4 June 1924. He avoided the dangerous windswept ridge and, by traversing the north face, ascended into the couloir, which has since borne his name.

== Everest solo, Reinhold Messner ==
The Norton Couloir was the scene of one of the greatest mountaineering achievements when, in 1980, Reinhold Messner entered this gully to avoid what, for a solo climber, was a dangerous ridge - especially its crux, the "Second Step" - and ascended to the summit, alone and without using supplemental oxygen. The most successful climb to that point by F. Edward Norton in 1924, was Messner's inspiration for this attempt: Norton had also used no oxygen.

== Other climbs through the couloir ==
In 1984 an Australian expedition succeeded in climbing a new route. From the main branch of the Rongbuk Glacier they went directly onto the north face and established their third high-altitude camp at the entrance of the couloir at 7,500 metres. From another camp at 8,150 m Tim Macartney-Snape and Greg Mortimer reached the summit on 2 October without bottled oxygen, the first Australians to reach the top of Everest.

In 2001, French snowboarder Marco Siffredi succeeded in the first snowboard descent of Everest by using the Norton Couloir. He died the following year, attempting a new descent via the Hornbein Couloir.
