= Jim Whittaker =

American mountaineer (1929–2026)

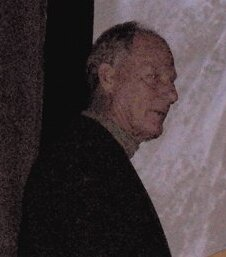
- Whittaker speaking at the Computer; History Museum in 2005
- Born: February 10, 1929; Seattle, Washington, U.S.
- Died: April 7, 2026 (aged 97); Port Townsend, Washington, U.S.
- Education: Seattle University; West Seattle High School
- Occupation: Mountaineer
- Relatives: Lou Whittaker (twin brother, 1929–2024)

James Warren Whittaker (February 10, 1929 – April 7, 2026) was an American climber and mountain guide. On May 1, 1963, he became the first American to reach the summit of Mount Everest as a member of the American Mount Everest Expedition led by Norman Dyhrenfurth, alongside the Sherpa Nawang Gombu, a nephew of Tenzing Norgay. They ran out of oxygen, but managed to reach the summit.

== Early life ==
James Warren Whittaker was born on February 10, 1929, in Seattle, Washington. Whittaker's father, Charles Whittaker was a traveling salesman for burglar alarms and bank safes. His mother, Horetense Elizabeth (Gant) was a homemaker.

He was the twin brother of Lou Whittaker, a mountain guide who is often mistakenly credited with achieving the 1963 ascent of Everest. In the 1940s, the twins started climbing, taking lessons from the Mountaineers Club of Seattle while in the Boy Scouts. A biology major, after graduating from Seattle University, Whittaker and his brother joined the Army. As experienced mountain climbers, they were assigned as Special Forces instructors, teaching Soldiers skiing and mountaineering skills.

== Career ==
On July 25, 1955, Whittaker became the first full-time employee of Recreational Equipment, Inc. (REI). as well as an early board member with American Alpine Club president Nicholas Clinch.

On May 1, 1963, Whittaker became the first American to reach the summit of Mount Everest. Accompanied by Sherpa Nawang Gombu, Whittaker planted an American flag at the summit. Upon his return to the United States, he became an instant celebrity and was invited to the White House by President John F. Kennedy. Whittaker's ascent subsequently provided REI with so much free advertising that the following year, 1964, its gross income topped US$1 million for the first time.

In 1965, with Dee Molenaar and others, he guided Robert F. Kennedy up the newly named Mount Kennedy. Kennedy and Whittaker became fast friends and spent multiple vacations together. In 1968, he became Kennedy’s state campaign chairman. When Kennedy was shot in Los Angeles, Whittaker immediately flew over to comfort RFK's wife when her brother in law had to shut off life-support.

In 1971, Whittaker was promoted to REI chief executive. Despite internal opposition to expanding beyond Seattle, he eventually succeeded in opening stores across the country, numbering 195 at the time of this death. In 1979, finding himself making more money in endorsements than as the REI chief executive, Whittaker retired from the company.

In 1990, Whittaker led the Earth Day 20 International Peace Climb that brought together climbers from the United States, USSR, and China to summit Mount Everest. In addition to putting twenty climbers on the summit, the expedition removed two tons of trash left on the mountain by previous expeditions.

He was chairman of the Board of Magellan Navigation, a company that produces handheld Global Positioning System (GPS) units.

Whittaker was involved in U.S. congressional testimony, including to help establish North Cascades National Park, Redwood National Park, and the Pasayten Wilderness.

== Personal life ==
Whittaker divorced his wife Blanche (Patterson) Whittaker in 1971, with whom he shared three sons. In 1973, he married Canadian Dianne Roberts, who shared his passion for outdoor adventures. The couple had two additional sons, Leif and Joss. They lived in Port Townsend, Washington.

In 1999, Whittaker released his autobiography, A Life on the Edge: Memoirs of Everest and Beyond. His younger son, Leif Whittaker, published My Old Man and the Mountain: A Memoir in 2016, which relates the story of his own summit of Mount Everest, with his parents accompanying him on part of the journey, and with comparisons to his father's Mount Everest experiences.

Jim Whittaker died in Port Townsend on April 7, 2026, at the age of 97. At the time of his death, he was survived by his wife, Dianne and three of his five sons.

== Awards and honors ==
- For being the first American to scale Mount Everest, Whittaker was awarded the Hubbard Medal by United States President John F. Kennedy.
- Big Jim Mountain in Chelan County, Washington is named for him.
- Jim Whittaker Wilderness Peak Trail in Cougar Mountain Regional Wildland Park near Issaquah, Washington is named for him.

== See also ==
- List of 20th-century summiteers of Mount Everest
- Cascadia Daily News Obituary
