= Nawang Gombu Sherpa =

Indian mountaineer (1936–2011)

Nawang Gombu
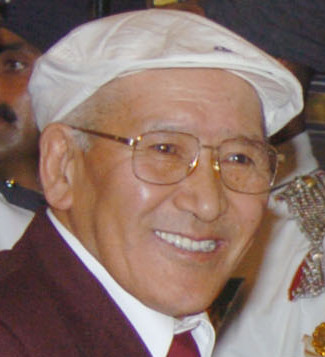
- Born: 1 May 1936; Minzu, Kingdom of Tibet
- Died: 24 April 2011 (aged 74); Darjeeling, West Bengal, India
- Citizenship: India
- Occupation: Mountaineer
- Known for: Being the first person to summit Mount Everest twice (1963, 1965); Being the first Indian to scale Nanda Devi in 1964
- Relatives: Tenzing Norgay (uncle); Jamling Tenzing Norgay (cousin); Tenzing Norgay Trainor (first cousin once removed); Tashi Tenzing (first cousin once removed)
- Awards: Tiger Medal (1953); Queen Elizabeth II Coronation Medal (1953); Hubbard Medal (1963); Padma Shri (1964); Padma Bhushan (1965); IMF Gold Medal (1966); Arjuna Award (1965); Tenzing Norgay Award (1986); 49th Independence Day Award (1996); Tenzing Norgay National Adventure Award (2006)

Nawang Gombu (1 May 1936 – 24 April 2011) was a Sherpa mountaineer who was the first man in the world to have climbed Mount Everest twice.

Gombu was born in Minzu, Tibet and later became an Indian citizen, as did many of his relatives including his uncle Tenzing Norgay. He was the youngest Sherpa to reach 26,000 ft. In 1964, he became the first Indian and the third man in the world to summit Nanda Devi (24,645 ft). In 1965, he became the first climber to summit Mount Everest twice—a record that remained unbroken for 15 years. First was with the American Expedition in 1963 as the eleventh man in world and the second was with Indian Everest Expedition 1965 as seventeenth.

== Early life and background ==
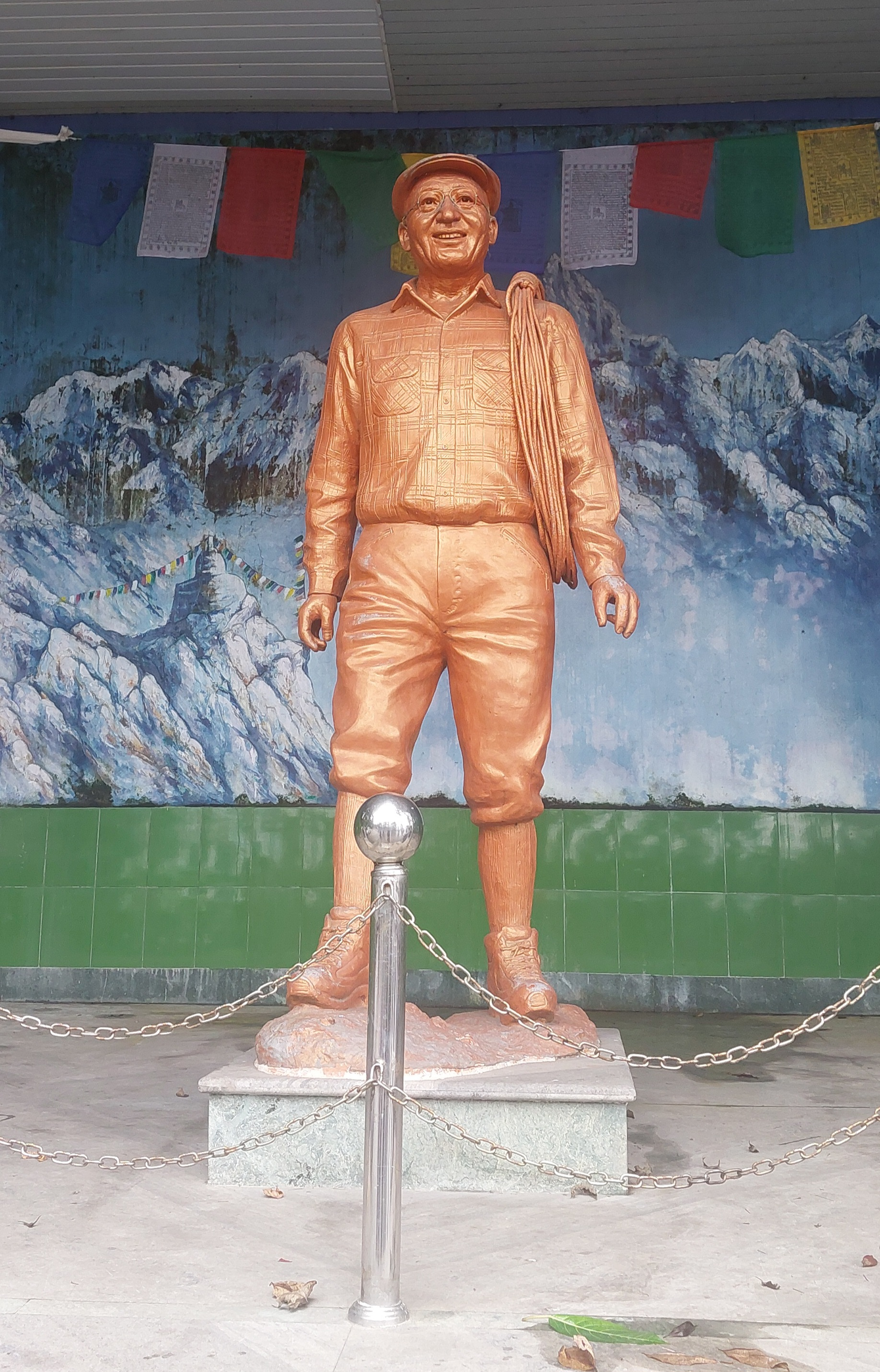
Statue of Nawang Gombu Sherpa in Darjeeling

Gombu was born in the Kharta region to the north-east of Everest. His early life was marked by the complexities of his parents' marriage. His father, Nawang, was a monk, the younger brother of the local feudal landowner. His mother, Tenzing's beloved older sister, was Lhamu Khipa, a nun from a family of serfs. The two eloped, causing a scandal, and for a time they lived in Khumbu, a Sherpa district on the other side of the border in Nepal.

As a young boy, Gombu was sent back to Tibet to become a monk at Rongbuk Monastery, an hour's walk below what is now Everest base camp. Gombu's grandmother was a cousin of the head lama, Trulshik Rinpoche, but the connection offered him no protection from the brutal punishment often meted out to novices who failed in their studies.

After a year, Gombu fled with a friend, crossing the Nangpa La into Khumbu, where the first western visitors were beginning to explore the southern approaches to Everest.

== Career ==
In 1954 the Himalayan Mountaineering Institute in Darjeeling sent him to Switzerland on a technical climbing course.

He was the first man in the world to climb Everest twice with the Indian Expedition and the American Expedition. No small feat as the record was not broken for a very long time. He climbed Mount Rainier numerous times and traveled extensively.

Having summitted Everest with Jim Whittaker on the 1963 American Expedition, Nawang Gombu became the first sherpa to be hired for guiding in the United States when Whittaker's twin brother Lou (who operated Rainier Mountaineering, Inc.) hired him to act as a seasonal guide assisting climbs on Mount Rainier in Washington State during the 1970s, 1980s, and 1990s.

Nawang Gombu lived in Darjeeling, India, and spent his life at the Himalayan Mountaineering Institute retiring as an adviser there. He had four children and a wife Sita who lives in Darjeeling.

== Honours and awards ==
He was awarded Arjuna award and Padma Bhushan for his achievements. Gombu attended reunions of climbs during the 1950s and 1960s as part of the 1963 Everest Expedition Celebrations. In 2006, he was awarded the Tenzing Norgay Lifetime Achievement Award in the field of Indian mountaineering by President APJ Abdul Kalam. He was also made an honorary member of the Alpine Club, the American Alpine Club, and the Himalayan Club.

In 1963, Gombu met President John F. Kennedy at the White House as part of a ceremony honoring climbers from the 1963 Everest Expedition. He also met Queen Elizabeth II on two occasions: the first in 1953, following the British Everest Expedition, and again in 1993 during the fortieth anniversary celebration of that climb. He presented both Kennedy and Queen Elizabeth with traditional Tibetan scarves.

Gombu dedicated his later life to the Sherpa community, raising funds and being President of the Sherpa Buddhist Association for the past few years.

=== Awards ===
- 1953 – Tiger Medal
- 1953 – Queen Elizabeth II Coronation Medal
- 1963 – Hubbard Medal of the National Geographic Society, USA
- 1964 – Padma Shree - India
- 1965 – Padma Bhushan – India
- 1966 – Indian Mountaineering Foundation's Gold Medal – India
- 1967 – Arjuna Award – India
- 2006 – Tenzing Norgay National Adventure Award – India

== See also ==
- Indian summiters of Mount Everest - Year wise
- List of Mount Everest records of India
- List of Mount Everest records
- List of Mount Everest summiters by number of times to the summit
