= Hubbard Medal =

Medal awarded by the National Geographic Society

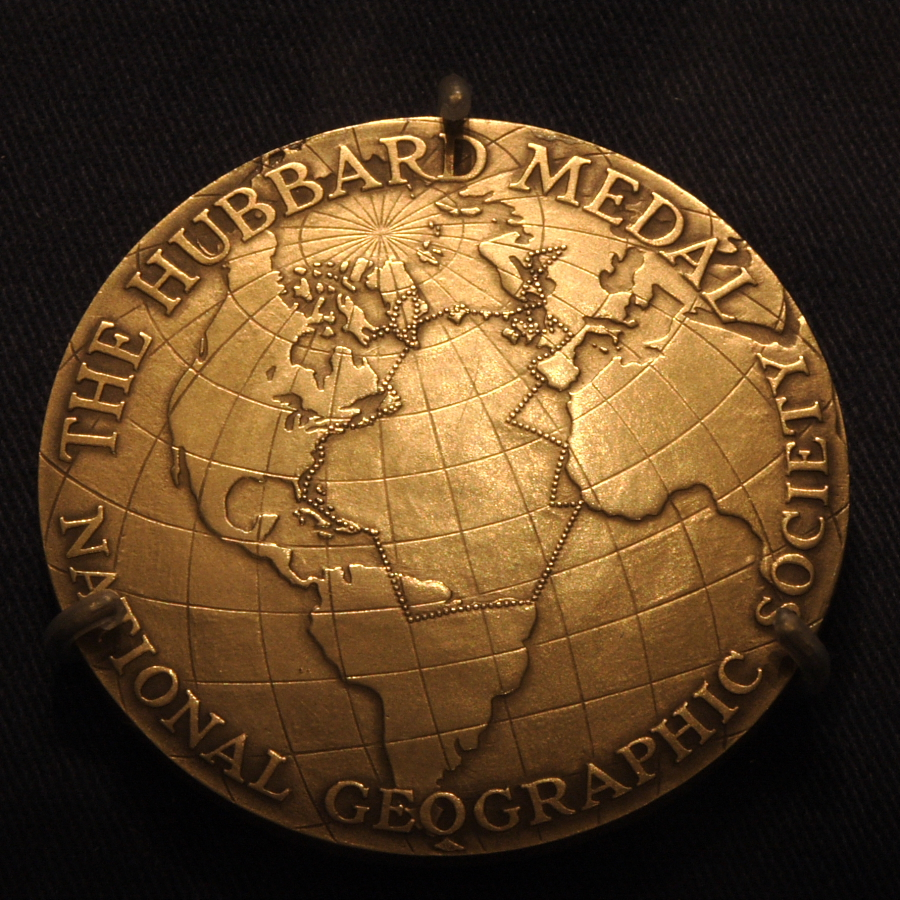
Anne Morrow Lindbergh's customized medal showing her flight route

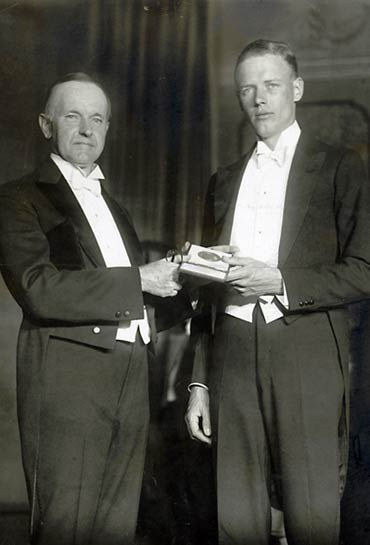
Charles Lindbergh receives his medal from President Calvin Coolidge

The Hubbard Medal is awarded by the National Geographic Society for distinction in exploration, discovery, and research. The medal is named for Gardiner Greene Hubbard, first National Geographic Society president. It is made of gold and is traditionally presented by the President of the United States.

== Recipients ==
Year	Name	Profession	Reason
1906	Robert Peary	polar explorer	Farthest north travel by a human.
1907	Roald Amundsen	polar explorer	First to transit the Northwest Passage.
1909	Robert Bartlett	polar explorer	Traveled the farthest to the North Pole.
1910	Sir Ernest Shackleton	polar explorer	
1926	Richard E. Byrd	polar explorer/aviator	First flight over the North Pole.
1927	Charles Lindbergh	aviator	First solo flight across the Atlantic Ocean
1931	Roy Chapman Andrews	Gobi Desert explorer	
1934	Anne Morrow Lindbergh	aviator	For serving as radio operator and copilot to her husband Charles on two flights in 1931 and 1933
1935	Captain Orvil Arson Anderson and Captain Albert William Stevens	aeronauts	Record setting ascent in balloon Explorer II.
1954	British Mount Everest Expedition	mountaineers	First ascent of Mount Everest.(group award)
1958	Paul Allen Siple	polar explorer	Veteran of several Antarctic expeditions.
1959	Adm. Arleigh Burke; Rear Adm. George J. Dufek	US Navy	Establishing Antarctic science stations.
1962	John Glenn	astronaut	First American to orbit Earth.
1962	Louis Leakey and Mary Leakey	anthropologist	
1963	Norman Dyhrenfurth and his team	mountaineers	First Americans to climb to the summit of Mount Everest
1969	Frank Borman; Jim Lovell; William Anders	astronauts	First crewed flight to the Moon.
1970	Neil Armstrong; Edwin Aldrin; Michael Collins	astronauts	For first crewed landing on the Moon.
1978	Marie Tharp; Bruce C. Heezen	Cartography geologist	
1981	John Young; Robert Crippen	astronauts	Awarded for first Space Shuttle flight.
1994	Richard Leakey	anthropologist	
1995	Jane Goodall	environmentalist	
1996	Robert Ballard	underwater explorer	Discovery of the wreck of the RMS Titanic
1999	Bertrand Piccard and Brian Jones	balloonists	
2000	Matthew Henson	polar explorer	Companion to first recipient Robert Peary. Awarded posthumously. (Not awarded at the time because of his race).
2010	Don Walsh	oceanographer	Bathyscaphe Trieste Dive
2012	Jacques Piccard	oceanographer	First Mariana Trench expedition
2013	Sylvia Earle; James Cameron; E. O. Wilson	biologist film director/explorer biologist	Marine exploration Marine exploration Biological research
2015	George Schaller	biologist	for his unwavering commitment to the well-being of the world's most endangered species
2016	Meave Leakey; Nainoa Thompson	paleoanthropologist navigator	
2017	Neil deGrasse Tyson	astrophysicist, author and science communicator	
2018	Peter H. Raven	Biologist and environmentalist	

== See also ==
- List of geography awards
