= Fazilpur =

Fazilpur may refer to:

- Fazilpur, Pakistan
- Fazilpur, Uttar Pradesh, a village in India
- Fazilpur Jharsa, a village in Haryana, India
- Fazilpur, Mainpuri, a village in Uttar Pradesh, India
- Fazilpur Dhandi railway station, a railway station in Pakistan

== See also ==
- Fazalpur
