= Phu Dorjee =

Indian Mountaineer

Phu Dorjee (1948/1949–1987) (also spelled Phu Dorji), born in Sikkim, was a Sherpa and the first Indian to make a solo ascent of Mount Everest.

== Everest ==
His solo ascent of Everest was made on 5 May 1984 as a member of an Indian expedition led by Darshan Kumar Khullar. He climbed the peak by the South East Ridge and was the first Indian ever to reach the summit without using any supplemental oxygen.

== Early years ==
He was part of a joint Indian-British expedition to then unclimbed Brammah 1, 6,416 m (21,050 ft), in the Kishtwar Himalaya in 1973. The British contingent included Chris Bonington and Nick Estcourt, they started a summit attempt with two Indian climbers but that was unsuccessful. Dorjee and Balwant Sandhu then joined Bonington and Estcourt on a summit attempt but they stepped back because supplies were limited. Ultimately Bonington and Estcourt managed to make the first ascent but they were not accompanied by any of the Indian climbers.

Dorjee was a member of an expedition to Siniolchu 6,888 m (22,598 ft) in 1979, about 20 climbers ascended the mountain by the northwest ridge, he was one of the six climbers in the first successful summit party.

In 1982 he was appointed as the lead instructor at the Sonam Gyatso Mountaineering Institute. Two years later Sonam Wangyal, the principal of the Institute, nominated Dorjee for the 1984 expedition to Everest sponsored by the IMF.

In 1985 he was one of the Indian members of a joint Indian-Japanese expedition to Saser Kangri. Dorjee was one of the four members of the party who successfully made the first ascent of the west peak of Saser Kangri II, 7,500 m (24,600 ft), following a route from the north.

Then in October 1986 he visited Chomo Yummo 6,829 m (22,405 ft) with an expedition led by Maj Gen P. L. Kukrety for selecting the team to go to Kangchenjunga the following year. Dorjee and four others reached the summit.

== Death ==
Dorjee died on May 1987 in Kangchanjunga. He had been selected as the lead climber for the Assam Rifles expedition led by Maj Gen P. L. Kukrety and led the first three-member team who set out for the summit, via the northeast spur, on 24 May. They were all climbing without supplemental oxygen and all three were lost without trace on the upper slopes of the mountain. On 31 May some Buddhist prayer flags, which Dorjee's group had been carrying, were found about 25 feet below the summit by the expedition's second party. It was concluded that Dorjee and his two compatriots, Choten Tsering and Fupu Bhutia, had reached the top and then been swept off the mountain during their descent.

Dorjee was 35 years old when he ascended Everest in 1984.

== Awards ==
He received the Padma Shri in 1984 after his solo ascent of Everest without supplemental oxygen.

In 1989 he was posthumously awarded the Kirti Chakra for his accomplishment.

== See also ==
- Indian summiters of Mount Everest - Year wise
- List of Mount Everest records of India
- List of Mount Everest records
- List of Mount Everest summiters by number of times to the summit
- List of 20th-century summiters of Mount Everest
