= Santosh Yadav =

Indian mountaineer

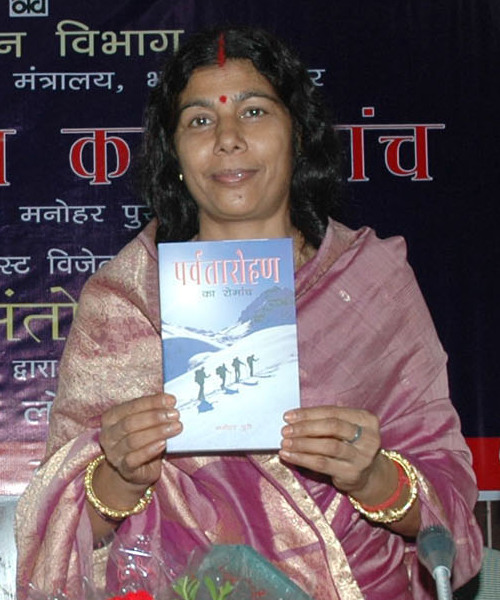
- Santosh Yadav in 2008
- Born: 10 October 1967 (age 59); Joniyawas, Rewari, Haryana, India
- Occupation: Mountaineer
- Spouse: Utham Kumar Lal (m. 1992)
- Awards: Padma Shri Award (2000) Tenzing Norgay National Adventure Award (1994)
- Website: santoshyadavmountaineer.com

Santosh Yadav (born 10 October 1967) is an Indian mountaineer. She is the first woman in the world to climb Mount Everest twice and the first woman to successfully climb Mount Everest from Kangshung Face. As a youth she criticized traditional societal beliefs including standards of dress for women.

She was quoted as saying "from the very beginning I was quite determined that if I chose a correct and rational path, the others around me had to change, not me." She climbed Everest in May 1992 and in May 1993 with an Indo-Nepalese Team.

During her Everest mission in 1992, she saved the life of a climber, Mohan Singh, by sharing oxygen with him. She also tried to help Saranjith, a fellow mountaineer who lay dying at the South Col but was unsuccessful.

== Early life and education ==
She was born in Joniyawas village in Rewari district of Haryana state, India as the sixth child in a family of five boys. She earlier attended a local village school and then moved to Delhi and got enrolled in a school there. Having a mind of studying a little bit more, she attended Maharani College in Jaipur, where she was able to see mountaineers climbing Aravalli Range from her room. She was inspired by this to join Uttarkashi's Nehru Institute of Mountaineering while successfully continuing her studies for the Indian Administrative Service (IAS) exams in a hostel provided by the Amity University at Noida. Yadav's interest in mountaineering developed during her time at the university.

== Career ==
In 1992, Santosh Yadav scaled Mount Everest, when she was barely 25, becoming the youngest woman in the world to achieve this feat, a record which was broken by 13-year-old Purna, in 2014. Within twelve months, she became a member of an Indo-Nepalese Women's expedition and scaled Everest the second time (1993), thus setting the record as the first woman to have scaled Everest twice. She also remained as an officer in the Indo-Tibetan Border Police. She was a part of the nine-nation international climbing camp-cum-expedition to Nun Kun in 1989. Also, her being a fervent environmentalist, she collected 500 kg of dumped wastes from the Himalayas.

Santosh Yadav was awarded the National Adventure Award 1994 and Padma Shri in 2000.

== Expeditions ==
- In 1999, Santosh Yadav led an Indian mountaineering expedition to Kangshung Face, Everest.
- In 2001, she led a mountaineering team to East Face, Mount Everest.
- In 2000, she received Padma shri.
- In 1994, Santosh Yadav was awarded for National Adventure .

== See also ==
- Indian summiters of Mount Everest - Year wise
- List of Mount Everest summiters by number of times to the summit
- List of Mount Everest records of India
- List of Mount Everest records
- List of 20th-century summiters of Mount Everest
- Dicky Dolma
- Malavath Purna
