= Malavath Purna =

Indian mountaineer (born 2000)

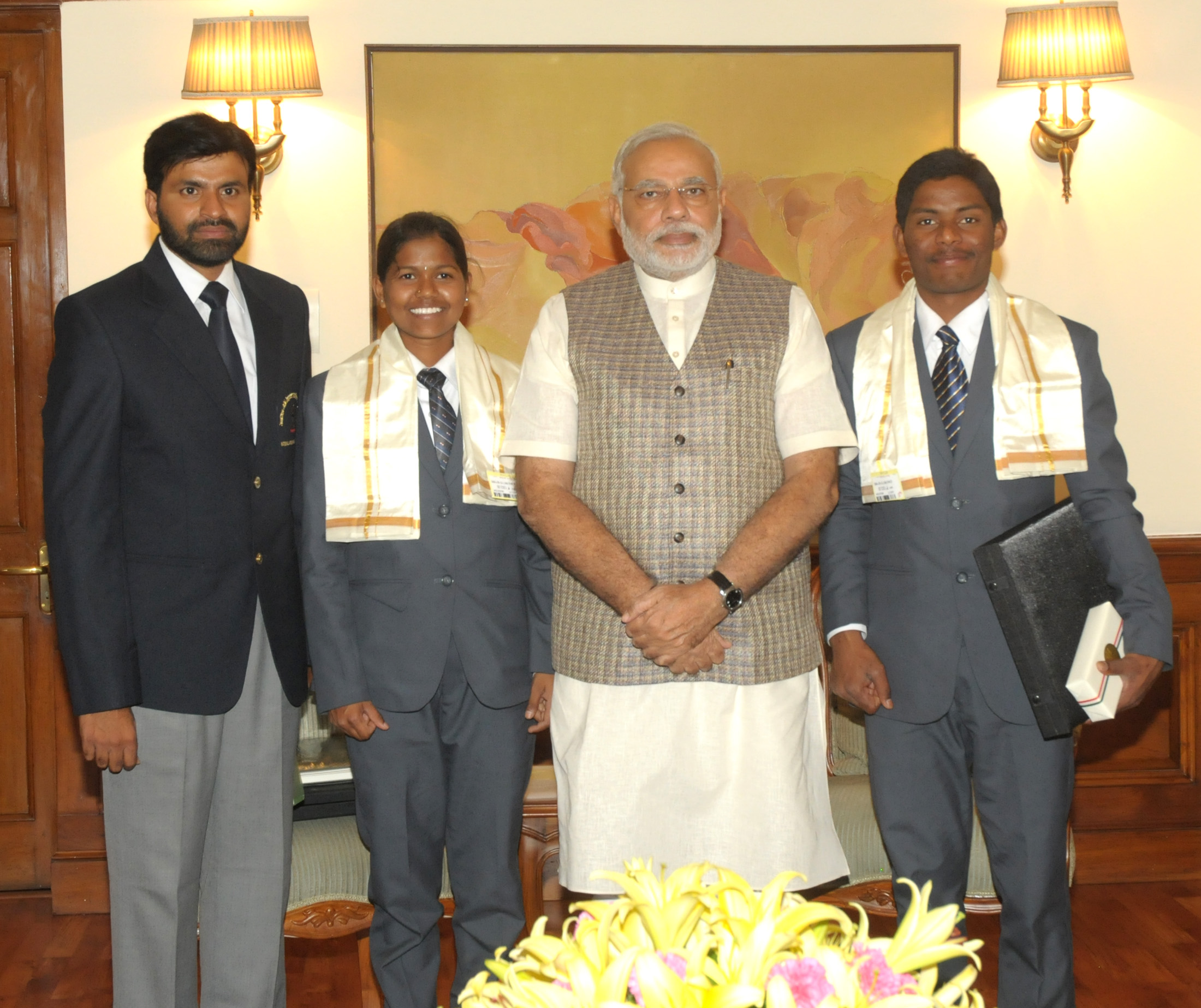
- Poorna (second from left) (third from right) with PM Narendra Modi in 2014

Personal information
- Born: 10 June 2000 (age 26) Pakala, (Telangana), India
- Education: Minnesota State University, Mankato, USA; Telangana Social Welfare Residential School TSWREIS; Himalayan Mountaineering Institute, Darjeeling

Climbing career
- Major ascents: Mount Everest in 2014; Mount Kilimanjaro in 2016; Mount Elbrus in 2017; Mount Aconcagua in 2019; Cartsnez Pyramid in 2019; Mount Vinson Massif in 2019; Denali in 2022
- Known for: Mount Everest

Malavath Poorna (Note: Also written as Malavath Poorna, Purna Malavath, or Poorna Malavath) (born 10 June 2000) is an Indian mountaineer. On 25 May 2014, Poorna climbed Mount Everest ,aged 13 years and 11 months, the youngest female to have reached the summit. Poorna climbed Mount Elbrus, the highest peak in Europe on 27 July 2017. After reaching the summit of Elbrus, Poorna unfurled a 50 ft long Indian Tricolor and sang the Indian National Anthem. She completed the Seven Summits on 5 June 2022 climbing Denali, along with father-daughter duo Ajeet Bajaj and Deeya Bajaj.

A film based on Poorna's life story was released in 2017 named Poorna: Courage Has No Limit directed by Rahul Bose.

== Early life and background ==
Poorna was born in Pakala village, Nizamabad district of Telangana state of India. She joined the Telangana Social Welfare Residential Educational Institutions Society for her education. Her talent was spotted by the secretary of the Society Dr. Repalle Shiva Praveen Kumar IPS. She was shortlisted for Operation Everest. In preparation for climbing Mount Everest, she trekked to the mountains of Ladakh and Darjeeling.

== Seven Summits ==
- Everest (Asia, 2014)
- Kilimanjaro (Africa, 2016)
- Elbrus (Europe, 2017)
- Aconcagua (South America, 2019)
- Carstensz Pyramid (Oceania region, 2019)
- Vinson Massif (Antarctica, 2019)
- Denali (North America, 2022)

== Forbes List ==
Poorna was listed on the Forbes India list of the self-made women in 2020.

== Biography ==
Poorna's biography has been written in the form of book format by Aparna Thota. The book captures Poorna's journey from her home town Pakala, a village in Nizamabad district of Telangana, to Everest even though she came from such a small village she managed to accomplish her dreams.

== See also ==
- Indian summiters of Mount Everest - Year wise
- List of Mount Everest summiters by number of times to the summit
- List of Mount Everest records of India
- List of Mount Everest records
