= Mohan Singh Kohli =

Indian mountaineer (1931–2025)

Captain Mohan Singh Kohli AVSM
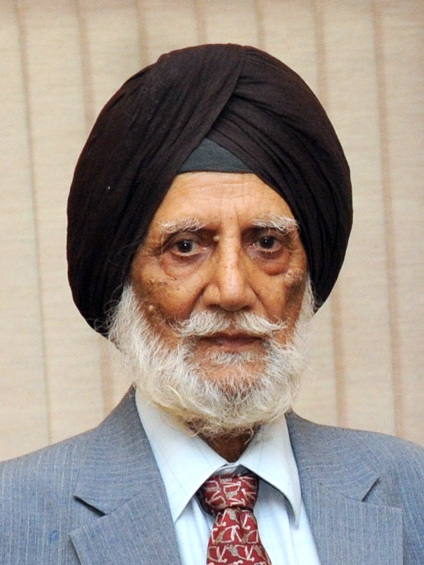
- Kohli in 2015
- Born: 11 December 1931; Haripur, North-West Frontier Province, British India
- Died: 23 June 2025 (aged 93); New Delhi, India
- Military career
- Allegiance: India
- Branch: Indian Navy; Indo-Tibetan Border Police
- Service years: 15
- Rank: Captain
- Awards: Padma Bhushan; Ati Vishisht Seva Medal; Arjuna Award; IMF Gold Medal

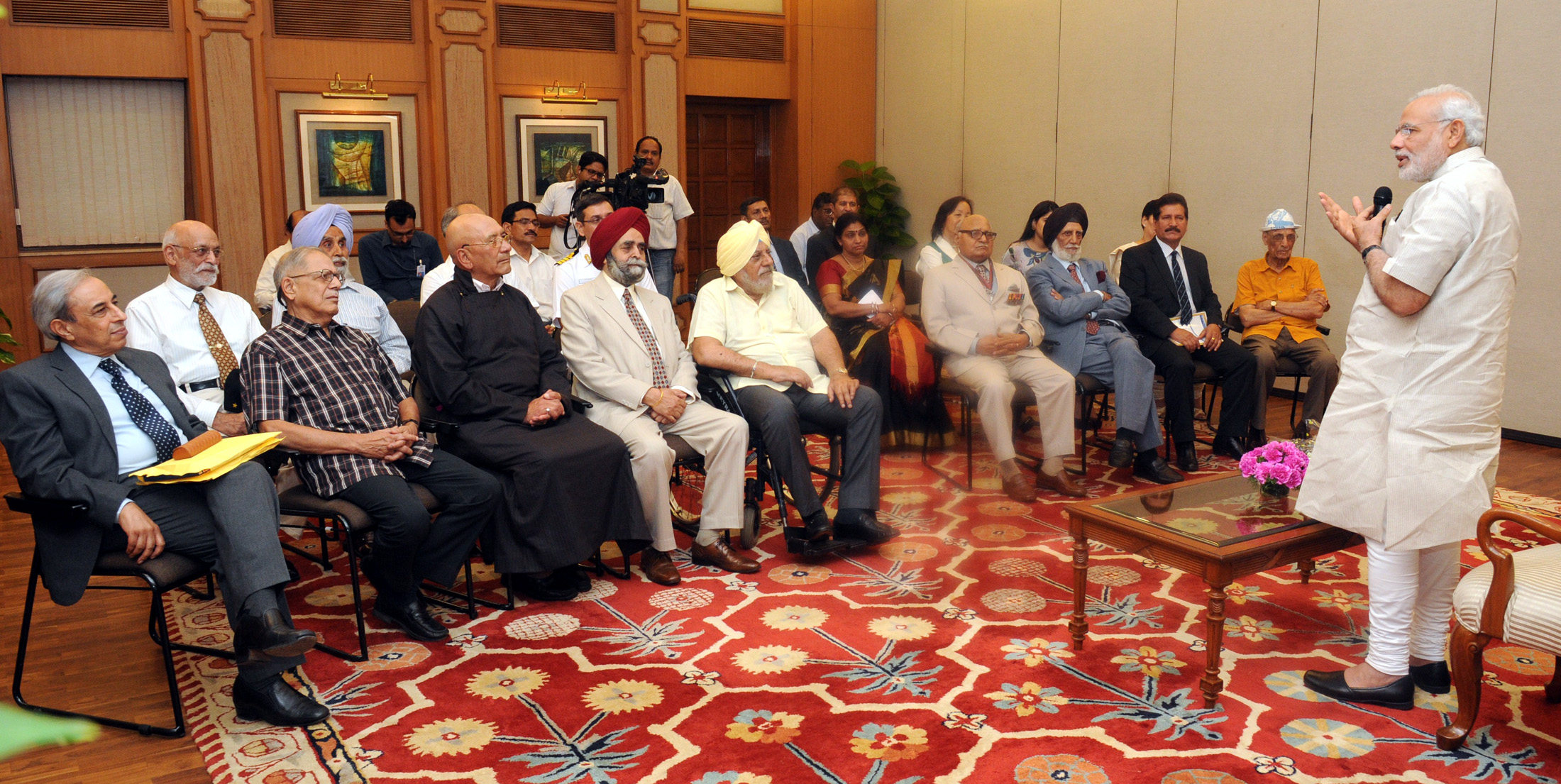
Prime Minister with the members of the 1965 Indian Everest Expedition on the occasion of its Golden Jubilee, 20 May 2015.

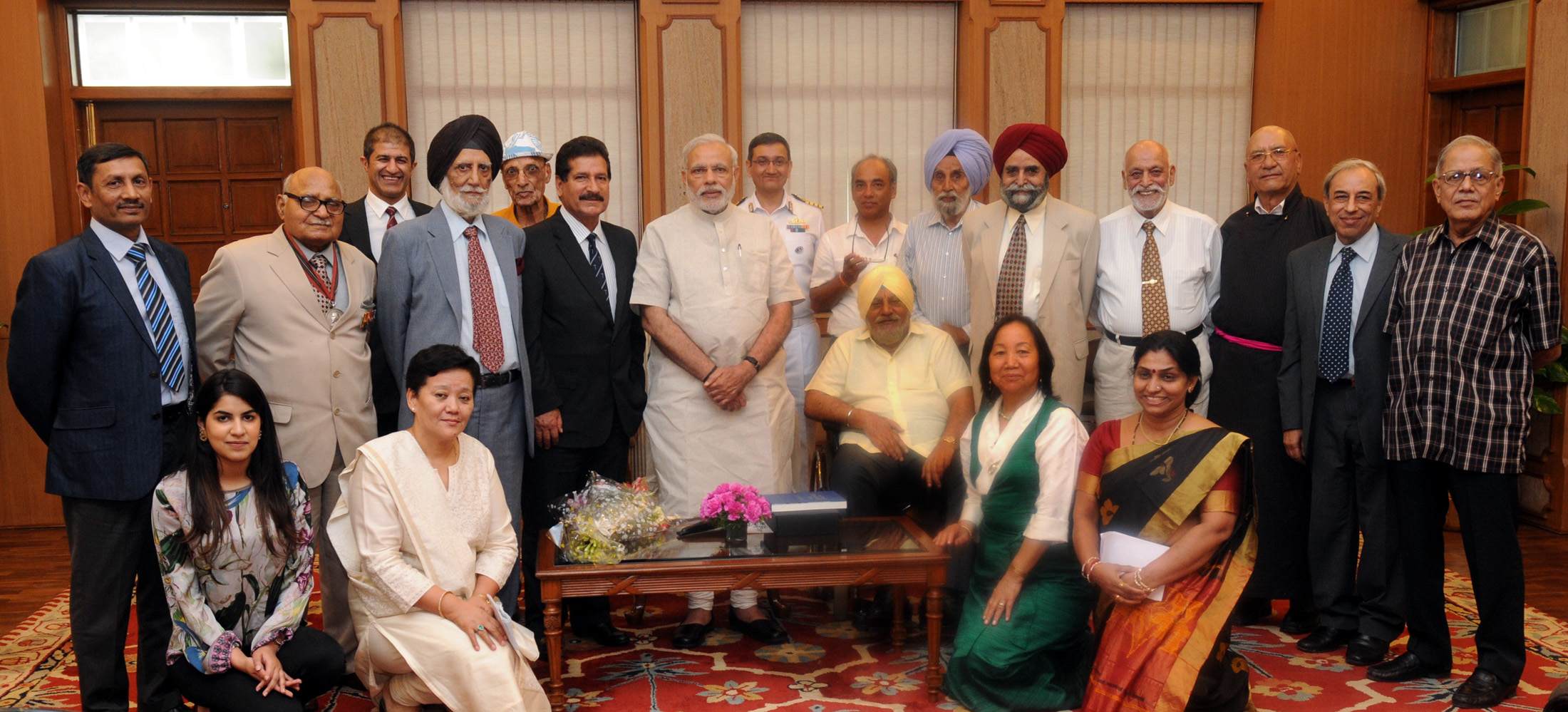
Prime Minister with members of the 1965 Indian Everest Expedition during the Golden Jubilee celebration on 20 May 2015.

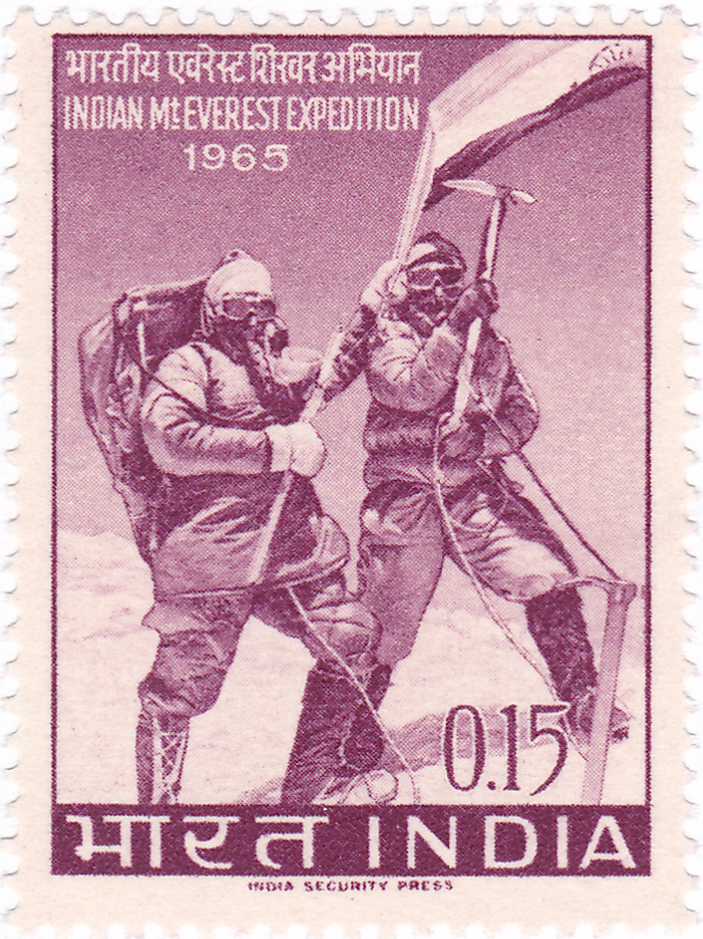
1965 Indian postage stamp commemorating the 1965 Everest Expedition.

Captain Mohan Singh Kohli (11 December 1931 – 23 June 2025) was an Indian Navy officer and mountaineer, who led the 1965 Indian Everest Expedition, which saw nine men reach the summit of Everest, a world record which was unbroken for 13 years.

== Life and career ==
Born and raised in Haripur, Pakistan on the banks of the Indus in the Karakoram mountains of the North West Frontier, Kohli witnessed the massacre of over 2,000 people during the partition of India.

Beginning with Saser Kangri 7,672 m (25,171 ft) in 1956, he participated in 20 major Himalayan expeditions, including India's first ascent of Nanda Kot and the maiden ascent of Annapurna III. In 1962, he spent three consecutive nights, including two without oxygen, on Everest at 8,849 m (29,032 ft) during severe blizzards.

During his tenure with the Indian Navy, he incorporated adventure training. Over 15 years with the Indo-Tibetan Border Police, he developed the force into a notable mountaineering organisation. Leading seven significant and sensitive missions under the guidance of officers B. N. Mullik and R. N. Kao, he worked with climbers and scientists from the US to install nuclear-powered listening devices on Indian Himalayan peaks to monitor Chinese missile capabilities.

Upon joining Air-India in 1971, Kohli promoted 'Trekking in the Himalayas' globally, making over 1,000 presentations in more than 50 countries, including appearances on popular television programmes such as To Tell the Truth and The David Frost Show. On 3 December 1978, he flew over the South Pole.

To protect the Himalayas, he secured support from Sir Edmund Hillary and other Himalayan figures, including Maurice Herzog, Sir Chris Bonington, Reinhold Messner, and Junko Tabei, establishing the Himalayan Environment Trust on 14 October 1989. The trust has contributed to preserving this world heritage.

In India, he also introduced Himalayan tourism, white-water rafting, aero-sports, luxury sea cruises, tourist charters to Goa, international conferences, and opened Lakshadweep and the Andaman Islands to tourism.

His 14-year tenure as Vice-President/President of the Indian Mountaineering Foundation was marked by many significant developments. After retiring in 1990, he focused on the development of youth through various adventure and outdoor leadership projects.

Kohli died in New Delhi on 23 June 2025, aged 93.

== Affiliation ==
Kohli served as President of the Indian Mountaineering Foundation from 1989 to 1993. He co-founded the Himalayan Environment Trust in 1989.

== Awards ==
Kohli received the following awards:

1. Padma Bhushan
2. Arjuna Award
3. Ati Vishisht Seva Medal
4. IMF Gold Medal
5. Punjab Government's Nishan-e-Khalsa
6. Delhi Government's Most Distinguished Citizen of Delhi Award
7. Tenzing Norgay National Adventure Award 2007 in the lifetime achievement category

He also received several international recognitions.

== 1965 Everest expedition ==
Kohli is known for leading India's first successful Indian Everest Expedition in 1965. Nine climbers reached the summit, setting a world record which was unbroken until the 1978 German-French Expedition 13 years later. Upon the team's return from Nepal, acting Prime Minister Gulzarilal Nanda headed the reception at the airport (Prime Minister Lal Bahadur Shastri was abroad). The entire team were given an Arjuna Award. Three members, including the team leader, were awarded the Padma Bhushan and the leader and eight team members were given the Padma Shree.

Indira Gandhi paid tribute saying: "The record of Commander Kohli's expedition will find special mention in history. It was a masterpiece of planning, organisation, teamwork, individual effort and leadership". She described the 1965 success as one of India's six major achievements after independence.

A full-length film on the expedition, with music by Shankar Jaikishan, was released across India and abroad. The story of the achievement was widely covered in national newspapers and magazines. Kohli and some team members were honoured in cities like Brussels, Paris, Geneva, and Rome. Tenzing Norgay accompanied Captain Kohli to several countries.

In addition to the Everest expedition, Captain M.S. Kohli and Tenzing Norgay climbed several European peaks, piloted by Raymond Lambert.

In India, the team was invited by Chief Ministers of various states and honoured at receptions. On 8 September 1965, Kohli addressed Members of Parliament in the Central Hall. The expedition sparked a significant increase in adventure clubs and mountaineering activities, leading to a resurgence in Indian mountaineering.

== The Nanda Devi affair ==
Shortly after the success on Everest Kohli led a US-India mission to Nanda Devi. The mission was a joint operation by the Central Intelligence Agency (CIA) and the Indian Intelligence Bureau, the objective was to place a nuclear-powered surveillance device on Nanda Devi which would be used to monitor China's nuclear program during the Cold War. Kohli recruited the Indian mountaineers for the mission, they included three who had summited Everest during the successful Indian Expedition which he had led earlier that year, and were officers in the ITBP (Sonam Gyatso, Harish Rawat and Sonam Wangyal), others from the same Everest expedition were Gurcharan Singh Bhangu (also an officer in the ITBP) and the Sherpas Phu Dorjee Sherpa, Ang Tsering. About fourteen other sherpas were recruited, including Pasang Dawa Lama, several were 'later absorbed in Indian para-military organisations'. Barry Bishop recruited the American mountaineers involved, several of those had been members of the 1963 American Mount Everest expedition along with Bishop.

== Books and magazines ==
- Incredible Himalayas, Indus Publishing (2005) ISBN 81-7387-179-5
- Mountains of India, Indus Publishing (2004) ISBN 81-7387-135-3
- The Great Himalayan Climb, Orient Paperbacks (2003) ISBN 978-81-222058-7-9
- Spies in the Snow, How CIA and the Indian Intelligence Lost a Nuclear Device in the Himalayas
- Spies of Anil in the Himalayas: Secret Missions and Perilous Climbs, University Press of Kansas (2003) ISBN 0-7006-1223-8
- The Himalayas: Playground of the Gods: Trekking, Climbing, Adventure (2000) M.S. Kohli
- Mountaineering in India (1989)

== See also ==
- Indian summiters of Mount Everest - Year wise
- List of Mount Everest summiters by number of times to the summit
- List of Mount Everest records of India
- List of Mount Everest records
