= 168 Field Regiment (India) =

- Active: 1963 – present
- Allegiance: India
- Branch: Indian Army
- Type: Artillery
- Size: Regiment
- Motto(s): Sarvatra, Izzat-O-Iqbal (Everywhere with Honour and Glory)
- Colors: Red & Navy Blue
- Anniversaries: 1 November - Raising Day; 9 December - Battle Honour Day
- Engagements: Indo-Pakistani War of 1965; Indo-Pakistani War of 1971; Battle of Longewala
- Battle honours: Longewala

Insignia
- Abbreviation: 168 Fd Regt

168 Field Regiment is part of the Regiment of Artillery of the Indian Army.

== Formation and history ==
168 Field Regiment was raised on 1 November 1963 at Pathankot. The first commanding officer was Lieutenant Colonel (later Brigadier) Kunhiram Venugopal VrC. The regiment consists of 1681, 1682 and 1683 field batteries.

== Class composition ==
The unit was raised with Gurkha troops from 64 Field Regiment and Jat troops from 65 Field Regiment. From 1979 onwards, the Gurkhas were replaced with hill tribes from Kumaon and Garhwal. The unit was converted to a mixed class composition from 1999.

== Operations ==
The regiment has taken part in the following operations–

Indo-Pakistani War of 1965

The regiment saw action in the Sialkot sector. It was part of 26 Infantry Division and was in direct support of 168 Infantry Brigade. The unit lost Gunner Maha Singh during the operations.

Indo-Pakistani War of 1971

During Operation Cactus Lily, the regiment saw action in the Jaisalmer sector in the deserts of Rajasthan. It was part of 12 Artillery Brigade, the divisional brigade of 12 Infantry Division (along with 167 Field Regiment, 170 Field Regiment and 185 Light Regiment). During the Battle of Longewala, the regiment provided accurate and devastating fire power to support 23 Punjab, which proved instrumental in the defence of Longewala.

Subsequently, during the Battle of BP 638, the regiment supported 13 Kumaon and 6 Independent Armoured Squadron who were chasing the retreating Pakistanis in the Jaisalmer sector. The regiment's action helped clear the enemy from the Boundary Pillar (BP) 638.

The regiment was awarded the honour title Longewala, two Vir Chakras and one Sena Medal for its gallant actions.

Operation Rhino

The regiment took part in counter terrorist operations in Assam between 1996 and 1999. For its brave actions, the regiment was awarded one Sena Medal, six COAS Commendation Cards and two Army Commander Commendation Cards during this tenure. The regiment has a second tenure in Assam around 2016.

Other operations

- Operation Brasstacks
- Operation Parakram
- Operation Rakshak

== Gallantry awards ==
The regiment has won the following gallantry awards–

- The regiment was awarded the honour title Longelwala for its valour during the 1971 war.
- The regiment was awarded Army Commander’s unit citation in 2015 and 2018.
- Kirti Chakra – 2
  - Major Braj Kishore Sharma
- Vir Chakra – 2
  - Second Lieutenant Gurjeet Singh Bajwa
  - Gunner Tek Ram
- Shaurya Chakra – 1
  - Captain Gurjeet Singh Bajwa (when serving with the Air OP)
- Sena Medal – 3
  - Captain Vishnu Laxman Wadodkar
  - Major Prabhanshu Singh
- Chief of Army Staff Commendation cards – 11
- Vice Chief of Army Staff Commendation cards – 5
- General Officer Commanding in Chief Commendation cards – 10

== Notable Officers ==
- Brigadier Darshan Khullar – mountaineer, author and historian. Commissioned into 22 Mountain Regiment, he commanded this regiment. Recipient of Padma Shri, Arjuna award and Ati Vishisht Seva Medal.

== See also ==
- List of artillery regiments of Indian Army
