= D. K. Khullar =

Indian mountaineer

- Born: 1941 (age 84–85); Bassi Pathana, Fatehgarh district, Punjab, India
- Occupations: Mountaineer; Writer; Army officer
- Known for: Everest ascent
- Awards: Padma Shri

Darshan Kumar Khullar is an Indian mountaineer, writer and a former Brigadier of the Indian Army. He led the Everest expedition which included Bachendri Pal and Phu Dorjee that summitted the peak in May 1984. The Government of India awarded him the fourth highest Indian civilian honour of Padma Shri in 1984.

== Biography ==
Born in 1941 at Bassi Pathana in Fatehgarh Sahib district in the Indian state of Punjab, Khullar did his education at the Rashtriya Indian Military College, Dehradun.

He was commissioned into 22 Mountain Regiment in the Regiment of Artillery in 1961. He participated in the Sino-Indian War of 1962. He commanded 168 Field Regiment. As a Brigadier, he commanded 54 Artillery Brigade (under 54th Infantry Division) in Sri Lanka as part of the Indian Peace Keeping Force. He briefly commanded the corps artillery brigade in Kashmir, when the insurgency broke out. He took premature retirement from the Army in 1993.

He was the principal of the Himalayan Mountaineering Institute (HMI), Darjeeling between 1981 and 1985. He was chosen as the leader of the 1984 Everest expedition team composed of eleven men and six women, which summitted the peak in May 1984 through the South East Ridge route. The team included Bachendri Pal, the first Indian woman to scale Mount Everest and Phu Dorjee, the first Indian to climb the peak without oxygen.

Khullar is a member of the Expedition Commission of the International Mountaineering and Climbing Federation, Berne, Switzerland. He is the author of several books on mountaineering and international politics and has co-authored the second book written by Bachendri Pal in 2006 about the Trans-Himalayan all-women expedition of 1997. Khullar lives a retired life in Ambala in Haryana.

== Works ==
Some of his publications are:

- Themes of Glory: Indian Artillery in War
- The Call of Everest: First Ascent by an Indian Woman
- A Mountain of Happiness
- When Generals Failed: The Chinese Invasion: Abdiction from Battle, Tawang, Sela, and Bomdila, 1962
- Security, Peace and Honour
- Pakistan, Our Difficult Neighbour and Allied Issues
- Pakistan our Difficult Neighbour and India's Islamic Dimensions

== Awards ==
The Government of India awarded him the civilian honour of Padma Shri in 1984. He was also awarded the Arjuna award and Ati Vishisht Seva Medal.

== See also ==
- Bachendri Pal
- Phu Dorjee
- Indian summiters of Mount Everest - Year wise
- List of Mount Everest summiters by number of times to the summit
- List of Mount Everest records of India
- List of Mount Everest records
