= Sonam Gyatso Mountaineering Institute =

Mountaineering school in Gangtok, Sikkim, India

Location
- Upper Sicheygaon, Sungava; Gangtok, Sikkim; India; 27°20′39.9″N 88°37′01.8″E

Information
- Founded: 25 September 1963
- Founder: Sonam Gyatso
- Principal: Sonam Wangyal
- Affiliation: Government of India

Sonam Gyatso Mountaineering Institute (SGMI) is a paramilitary mountaineering school, located in Gangtok, India.

== History ==
In 1963, the Mountaineering Institute was established in Gangtok by Indian mountaineer Sonam Gyatso. After the demise of Gyatso in 1968, the institute was renamed Sonam Gyatso Mountaineering Institute. It is currently headed by former Intelligence Bureau (IB) officer Sonam Wangyal as its principal.

The institute is known for imparting high-altitude mountaineering training to Indian Army, IB, other paramilitary forces such as Indo-Tibetan Border Police and Assam Rifles. Also, it runs short-term courses for civilians.

=== List of expeditions ===
- 1979 Siniolchu expedition - 20 members from the institute climbed the peak.
- 1984 Mount Everest expedition - Institute's lead instructor Phu Dorjee became the first Indian to climb Everest without supplemental oxygen.
- 1991 Sanglaphu expedition - 11 members team from the institute made the first ascent.

== Notable faculty ==
- Sonam Gyatso
- Harish Chandra Singh Rawat
- Phu Dorjee
- Sonam Wangyal

== Rankings ==
- In 2016, Redbull included the institute in its list of top 10 mountaineering schools in India.

== See also ==
- Himalayan Mountaineering Institute
- Mountaineering in India
