= S. R. Sankaran =

Indian bureaucrat & social worker

S. R. Sankaran IAS (Retd.)
- Born: 22 October 1934; Thanjavur, Tamil Nadu, India
- Died: 7 October 2010 (aged 75); Hyderabad, Andhra Pradesh (Now Telangana), India
- Resting place: Panjagutta crematorium, Hyderabad
- Education: (B.Com) American College, Madurai
- Occupation: Civil servant
- Years active: 1956–2010
- Known for: Indian Administrative Service; 1976 Abolition of Bonded Labour Act
- Awards: Padma Bhushan

S. R. Sankaran (1934–2010) was an Indian Administrative Service officer of 1956 batch from Andhra Pradesh cadre and social worker who served as the Chief Secretary of the State of Tripura. He is known for his contributions for the enforcement of Abolition of Bonded Labour Act of 1976 which abolished bonded labor in India. One among the seven civil servants held hostage by the People's War Group in 1987, he was the chief negotiator of the state government in the negotiations of 2004 to end naxalite violence in Andhra Pradesh. He was a mentor to the Safai Karmachari Andolan, a social initiative propagated by Bezwada Wilson to eradicate manual scavenging in India. The Government of India awarded him the third highest civilian honour of the Padma Bhushan, in 2005, for his contributions to society, but he declined the honor. His social welfare activities earned him the moniker, People's IAS officer.

== Biography ==
Sankaran was born on 22 October 1934 in Thanjavur, in the south Indian state of Tamil Nadu in a Tamil Brahmin family. He graduated in commerce with honours from American College, Madurai, coming first in the examination, and joined there as a lecturer when he was inducted into Indian Administrative Service in 1956. One of his earlier postings was as the Sub-collector of Nandyal in Kurnool district in 1959. Later, he served as the District Collector of Adilabad, Khammam and Nellore before moving to the Union Government as a special assistant to Mohan Kumaramangalam, the then Minister for Steel and Mines. While at this post, he assisted Kumaramangalam to push through the nationalization of coal mines during 1971–73. He returned to the state as the Principal Secretary for Social Welfare with the Government of Andhra Pradesh, a post he held for two different periods. During his first tenure as the Principal Secretary, he established Integrated Tribal Development Agencies for single-line administration of tribal areas and introduced Special Component Plan and Tribal Sub Plans to ensure adequate provision of budgetary resources to be earmarked for the financially weaker sections of the society. Under these schemes, he addressed the issues such as religious conversions, atrocities against women and education for dalits; he set up dedicated schools and hostels for dalit people which eventually developed into the Andhra Pradesh Social Welfare Residential Schools and after bifurcation of Telangana State those schools are called as Telangana Social Welfare Residential Schools in Telangana State. He also toured the villages to inspire the villagers to break free from bondage and contributed to the enforcement of the 1976 Abolition of Bonded Labour Act. It is reported that Sankaran's efforts were disapproved by the ruling Chief Minister and he was asked to proceed on leave when Nripen Chakraborty, who was the chief minister of Tripura during that time, invited him to join Tripura state administration as the Chief Secretary, a post he held for six years.

After his stint in Tripura, he moved to the Union Government, superannuating from service while holding the post of a Secretary at the Ministry of Rural Development. During this period, he worked for the rehabilitation of the victims of Karamchedu massacre of 1985 when 6 dalits were killed in clashes with the upper caste communities. Later, he was held captive by the People's War Group in 1987, after they abducted him and six of his colleagues while they were touring East Godavari District but was set free later, along with the others. On his retirement from service, he returned to Andhra Pradesh when the Naxalite–Maoist insurgency was gaining momentum and he organized a social forum under the name Concerned Citizens Committee in 1997 which protested against the fake encounter killings of the insurgents as well as the militancy of the insurgents. He was appointed as the Commissioner of the Panel on food security in 2003 by the Supreme Court of India where he served for two years. On his return to Andhra Pradesh, the state government appointed him as the chief negotiator for negotiations with the militants in 2004. He mediated two rounds of talks between the government and the militants but the talks were not fruitful as the government insisted on total disarmament; however, this was the first instance the Maoists agreed to talks with the government. After the failure of talks with Naxal groups, he was involved with the activities of Safai Karmachari Andolan, founded by Bezwada Wilson, and served as a mentor to the organization. Under his guidance, the initiative worked to free a majority of the manual laborers in the State handling human excreta till their number dwindled from 1.3 million to 300,000.

Sankaran, who contributed a chapter, Administration and the Poor, to the 2002 publication, Dalits and the State by Ghanshyam Shah, died on 7 October 2010, at the age of 75 in Hyderabad, succumbing to a cardiac arrest. His mortal remains were confined to flames at Punjagutta crematorium the next day, his niece lighting the funeral pyre, in the presence of thousands of people.

== Awards and honors ==
The Government of India awarded Sankaran the civilian honor of the Padma Bhushan in 2005, which was later refused by him. In 2011, a year after his death, the Government of Andhra Pradesh installed his statue in front of the office of the Department of Social Welfare, the first instance a civil servant was honored by the government with a statue. On his birthday (22 October) in 2013, C. H. Hanumantha Rao, a former member of the National Advisory Council, released the first of the two-volume publication, Marginalisation, Development and Resistance: Essays in Tribute to SR Sankaran, which detailed his contributions for the welfare of the marginalized communities. When Malavath Purna, a tribal teenager, summited Mount Everest in May 2014, thus becoming the youngest female to summit the highest peak in the world, she carried a photograph of Sankaran and B. R. Ambedkar, in honour of the services rendered by them towards the cause of Dalits. Vikrama Simhapuri University has instituted an annual award, S. R. Sankaran Gold Medal for the best outgoing student in the Department of Social Welfare, in his honor and the National Institute of Rural Development, Hyderabad has a chair-professorship on rural labour, S. R. Sankaran Chair, named after him.

== Trivia ==
- It was reported that Sankaran, on his appointment as the Chief Secretary of the Tripura, arrived Agartala with a small suitcase as his only piece of luggage and, instead of waiting for his official receivers, hailed a rickshaw to proceed to the Circuit House which housed his would-be office.
- He was a bachelor, reportedly by choice.
- He was a vegetarian and known to have donated a considerable part of his earnings to the financially compromised people.
- He participated in the campaign against Aadhaar biometric system, alongside V. R. Krishna Iyer, citing that the system should be implemented after ascertaining its usefulness and the methodology is fully explained to public.
- Sankaran was once selected as the head of the Lal Bahadur Shastri National Academy of Administration, Mussourie which trained Indian Administrative Service officers but the selection was subsequently cancelled, reportedly fearing he would propagate his ideals at the institution.
- As the Chief Secretary of Tripura, he once forced the retreat of Indian Armed Forces when they entered the State without approval from the State Government.

== See also ==
- Telangana Social Welfare Residential Schools
- Bezwada Wilson
- Nripen Chakraborty
- Karamchedu massacre
