= Poorna: Courage Has No Limit =

2017 Indian film directed by Rahul Bose

Poorna
- Theatrical release poster
- Directed by: Rahul Bose
- Written by: Prashant Pandey; Shreya Dev Verma
- Based on: Malavath Purna
- Produced by: Amit Patni; Rahul Bose; Meraj Shaikh(Associate Producer)
- Starring: Aditi Inamdar; S. Maria; Harsha Vardhan; Rahul Bose
- Cinematography: Subhransu Das
- Edited by: Manan Mehta
- Music by: Songs: Salim–Sulaiman; Score: Tanuj Tiku
- Production companies: PVR Pictures; Rahul Bose Productions
- Distributed by: PVR Pictures
- Release dates: 6 January 2017 (Palm Springs); 31 March 2017
- Running time: 100 min
- Country: India
- Languages: Hindi; English; Telugu

Poorna is a 2017 Indian Hindi-language biographical adventure film directed by Rahul Bose. The film stars himself with Aditi Inamdar as Malavath Poorna, the youngest girl to climb Mount Everest. The film was released in India on 31 March 2017 to positive reviews. The film was screened at the 2017 Palm Springs International Film Festival where it was nominated on the festival's list of "30 Best Feature Films."

== Plot ==
Poorna Malavath (Aditi Inamdar) belongs to a Telugu-speaking tribal family in Pakala, Nizamabad district in Telangana. Her parents (mother Lakshmi and father Devidas) are farm labourers. She joins the State Social Welfare Residential Educational Institutions Society for her education. Her talent is spotted by the honest secretary of the society, Dr. R.S. Praveen Kumar (Rahul Bose). The chief minister, N. Kiran Kumar Reddy (Harsha Vardhan), authorises her to go for Operation Everest along with a Dalit mountaineer, Sandhanapalli Anand Kumar (Manoj Kumar). In preparation for climbing Mount Everest, headed by Coach Shekhar Babu (Gyanendra Tripathi) and Colonel Khan (Arif Zakaria), she treks to the mountains of Ladakh and Darjeeling. On 25 May 2014, Poorna scales the highest peak of Mount Everest and, aged 13 years and 11 months, becomes the youngest girl in the world to have reached the summit of Everest.

== Cast ==
- Aditi Inamdar as Poorna
- Rahul Bose as Dr. R.S. Praveen Kumar
- Heeba Shah as Meena Gupta
- Dhritiman Chatterjee as Alexander
- S. Mariya as Priya
- Harsha Vardhan as N. Kiran Kumar Reddy
- Gyanendra Tripathi as Shekhar Babu
- Manoj Kumar as Anand
- Dr. Rayala Harischandra as Priya's father
- Lakshmi Kola as Poorna's mother
- Arif Zakaria as Colonel Khan
- D. Raju as Poorna's sister's husband
- Appaji Ambarisha Darbha as Teacher
- Keshav Deepak as G V Reddy

== Production ==
Rahul Bose was initially not associated with the film until he was offered the role of Dr. Kumar. He liked the script and offered to direct and produce Poorna, raising funds in four months. Aditi Inamdar was chosen to play the titular role from a group of 109 girls. The film was shot in Pakala village over an 11-day period. Pakala is the village that the real-life Poorna grew up in.

== Soundtrack ==
Poorna

Soundtrack album by Salim–Sulaiman
- Released: 3 March 2017
- Genre: Feature film soundtrack
- Length: 16:14
- Label: Zee Music Company

The soundtrack of Poorna was composed by Salim–Sulaiman while the lyrics were written by Amitabh Bhattacharya.

No.	Title	Singer(s)	Length
1.	"Kuch Parbat Hilaayein"	Arijit Singh	04:13
2.	"Poori Qaaynaat"	Raj Pandit & Vishal Dadlani	04:48
3.	"Baabul Mora"	Arijit Singh	03:33
4.	"Kuch Parbat Hilaayein (Intimate)"	Salim Merchant	03:40
Total length:			16:14

== Reception ==
=== Critical reception ===
Poorna received a positive response from the critics based on the reviews. Neil Soans of The Times of India appreciated the film saying, "Returning to a directorial capacity after 16 years, Rahul Bose recognizes the beauty in simplicity and uses it to the film's advantage. Grounded performances combined with stirring music elevate this relatively straightforward tale, making it essential viewing not only for the young Indian woman, but for anyone looking to scale great heights against all odds." and gave it a rating of 4 stars out of 5. Sarit Ray of The Hindustan Times praised the film saying, "Poorna shows you that incredible stories can be told simply. Bollywood can learn from that." and gave the film a rating of 4 stars out of 5. Shubhra Gupta of The Indian Express lauded the movie by saying, "Fairytales do come true and the story of Poorna Malavath is the proof. Her biopic, directed by Rahul bose, does justice to the extraordinary story of a 13-year-old tribal girl climbing Mt Everest." and gave the film a rating of 3 1/2 stars out of 5. Saibal Chatterjee of NDTV said that, "Poorna is a rare Hindi film that travels to the heart of rural landscape. Even rarer is the use of a smattering of Telugu in the dialogues, which, along with an effective musical score, augments the authenticity of the film's setting and soundscape. It also draws enormous strength from the deeply affecting performances by newcomer Aditi Inamdar (in the role of the resolute Poorna) and Bose himself (as the unwavering mentor firm in his belief that it is his responsibility as a bureaucrat to facilitate positive change in the lives of the most disadvantaged)." and gave the film a rating of 3 stars out of 5.

=== Accolades ===
Award Ceremony	Category	Recipient	Result	Ref.(s)
10th Mirchi Music Awards	Raag-Inspired Song of the Year	"Poori Qaaynaat"	Nominated	

== See also ==
- Himalayan Mountaineering Institute
- Vertical Limit
- 127 Hours
- Cliffhanger
