= Bezwada Wilson =

Indian activist

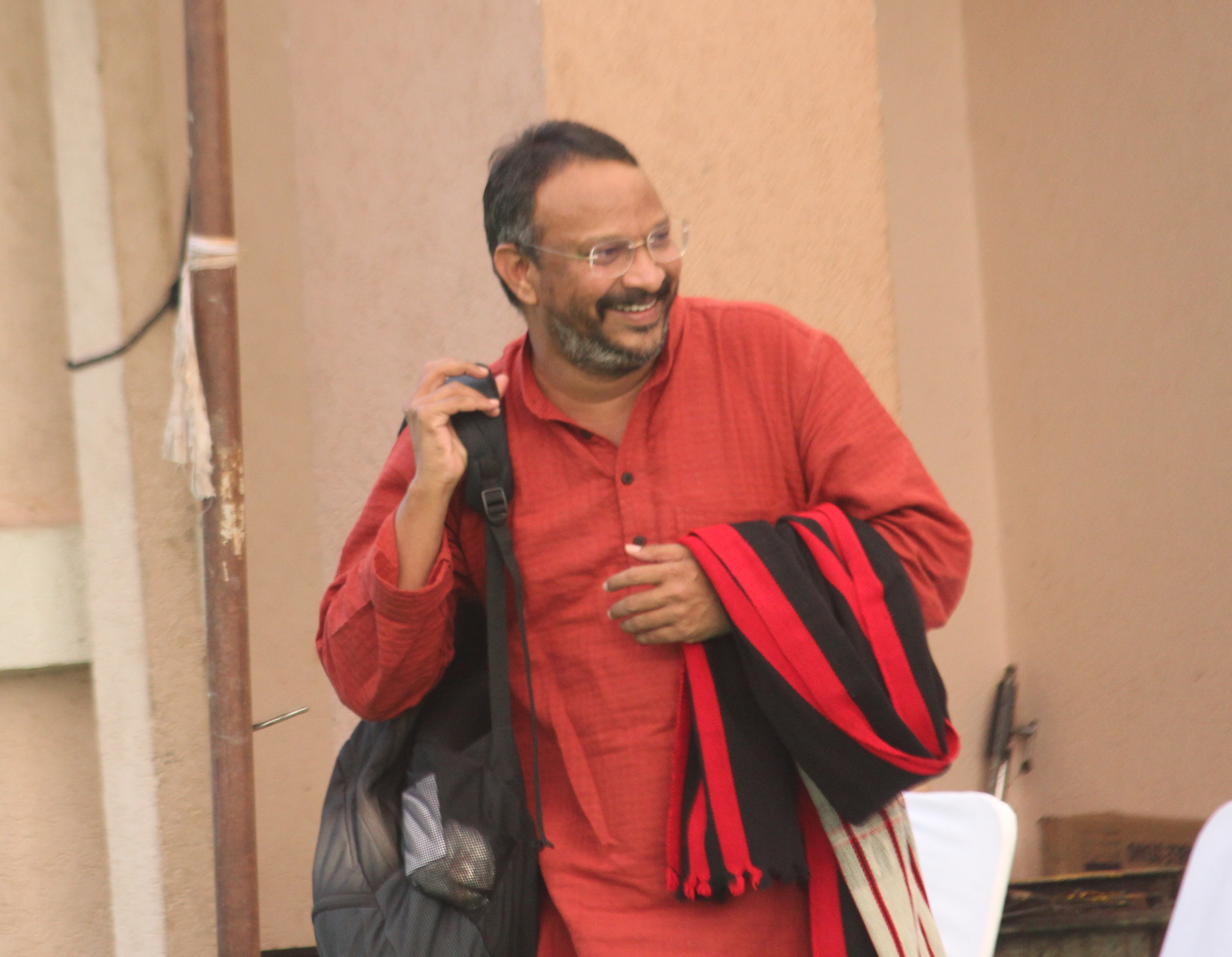
- Bezwada Wilson (2017)
- Born: 1966 (age 59–60)
- Education: Dr. B. R. Ambedkar Open University, Hyderabad
- Occupation: Indian activist
- Organization: Safai Karmachari Andolan (SKA)
- Notable work: Campaigning for the eradication of manual scavenging
- Awards: Ramon Magsaysay Award (2016)

Bezwada Wilson (born 1966) is an Indian activist and one of the founders and National Convenor of the Safai Karmachari Andolan (SKA), an Indian human rights organization that has been campaigning for the eradication of manual scavenging, the construction, operation and employment of manual scavengers which has been illegal in India since 1993. His work at SKA, a community-driven movement, has been recognized by the Ashoka Foundation which has nominated him a Senior Fellow. On 27 July 2016, he was honoured with the Ramon Magsaysay Award. He is an Ambedkarite.

== Early life ==
Bezwada was born in 1966 in the Kolar Gold Fields (KGF) in Karnataka in Southern India. He is the youngest child of Bezwada Rachel and Bezwada Yacob, both belonging to the manual scavenging community.

His father began working for the township in 1935 as a safai karamchari, also called a manual scavenger, manually removing excreta from dry toilets. He attempted to find other manual labor but was unsuccessful. His eldest brother also worked as a manual scavenger in the Indian railways for four years and then ten years in KGF Gold mines township.

Bezwada went to upper primary school in Andhra Pradesh and stayed in the hostel for Scheduled Castes. He went to high school and intermediate in Kolar and Hyderabad. When he realized his parents' true occupation, he contemplated suicide.

Bezwada graduated in political science from Dr. B. R. Ambedkar Open University, Hyderabad, and was involved in community service, especially youth programs. He saw that many children dropped out of school and then took up scavenging. He believed that if he helped the children complete school and take vocational training they could keep away from scavenging.

== Campaign against manual scavenging ==
In 1986, Bezwada began his fight to end manual scavenging. The first hurdle in his fight was at home; his parents and relatives said he should not focus his life on something that always existed. It was over years that they came to accept that he was dedicating his life to helping eradicate manual scavenging. Too many people within the community were ashamed to even admit manual scavenging existed or that they did it. Bezwada began breaking the silence.

Bezwada also began a letter-writing campaign, contacting the KGF authorities, the minister, and chief minister of Karnataka, the prime minister, and newspapers, but they remained largely unacknowledged.

In 1993, the Parliament enacted the ‘Employment of Manual Scavengers and Construction of Dry Latrines (Prohibition) Act in 1993', which banned the construction of dry latrines and outlawed the practice of manual scavenging. Despite the ban, the practice of manual scavenging continues across India.

Bezwada took photographs of dry latrines and manual scavenging in KGF and sent it to P.A.K. Shettigar, the then managing director of KGF, threatening action under the Act. An emergency meeting was called to convert dry latrines into water-seal latrines and transfer all scavengers to non-scavenging jobs. However, it was only when photographs were published in a 1994 article in the Deccan Herald, resulting in embarrassing questions in Parliament, that the Karnataka government was forced to acknowledge that manual scavenging continued to be a problem.

Bezwada then worked for two years to organize manual scavengers in Karnataka. A platform, the Campaign Against Manual Scavenging (CAMS), was formed. This oversaw the conversion of dry latrines into flush toilets and rehabilitation of those who were engaged in manual scavenging.

Wilson moved to Andhra Pradesh and began working with Paul Diwakar, a leading Dalit activist, and S. R. Sankaran, a retired Indian Administrative Officer. In 2001 the Andhra Pradesh government agreed to a total survey of the state to identify manual scavengers and dry latrines for liberation and rehabilitation. Bezwada prepared the survey format, where volunteers photographed and documented each manual scavenger and dry latrine.

=== Safai Karmachari Andolan ===
In 1994, Bezwada helped found Safai Karmachari Andolan (SKA) along with S. R. Sankaran and Paul Diwakar. SKA's goal is to end the practice of manual scavenging and help those engaged in it find dignified work. SKA trains teams to work towards the elimination of manual scavenging in various Indian states. SKA initially worked on the state level, until 2003 when Bezwada and four other team members moved to Delhi to launch the Safai Karmachari Andolan nationwide.

In 2003, Bezwada and the SKA initiated the filing of a Public Interest Litigation in the Supreme Court of India. SKA and 18 other civil society organizations, manual scavengers, and individuals signed the affidavit as litigants naming all states and government departments of Railways, Defence, Judiciary, and Education as violators of the Manual Scavenging Prohibition Act.

The PIL was a major step in the efforts to abolish manual scavenging. All the states and central ministries were forced to address the issue of manual scavenging. The Supreme Court gave strict orders that the Chief Secretaries of States and Heads of Departments of the central ministries should appear before the court for the case hearings. To date, there have been 23 hearings and in the state of Haryana, for the first time, in 2010 the act was enforced and 16 members were taken into custody for violating the law and employing manual scavengers.

By 2007, the SKA felt the struggle was going too slow. The legal process had put the onus on the victims to prove manual scavenging existed. So they launched Action 2010, by which they vowed to end manual scavenging by 2010 by simply asking those engaged in the practice to leave the practice and find alternative work.

The liberation of safai karmacharis became an important issue during the planning of the 12th Five Year Plan of India in 2010. Bezwada met with parliamentarians, ministers, and national advisory members during this time and submitted systematic documentation of manual scavenging across the country.

In 2009, Bezwada was elected an Ashoka Senior Fellow for human rights.

In October 2010, the head of the National Advisory Council, Sonia Gandhi, wrote to the Prime Minister's office declaring manual scavenging as a national shame and to address its abolition with the utmost urgency and priority. The NAC resolved to see that manual scavenging was over by 2012. Task forces were formed by the government of India for a new survey of the entire country, rehabilitation, amendment of the law to make it stricter, and demolition of dry latrines.

The Planning Commission of India constituted a sub-group on safai karmacharis with Bezwada as its convenor. The sub-group has submitted its report.
