= Sonam Wangyal =

Indian mountaineer

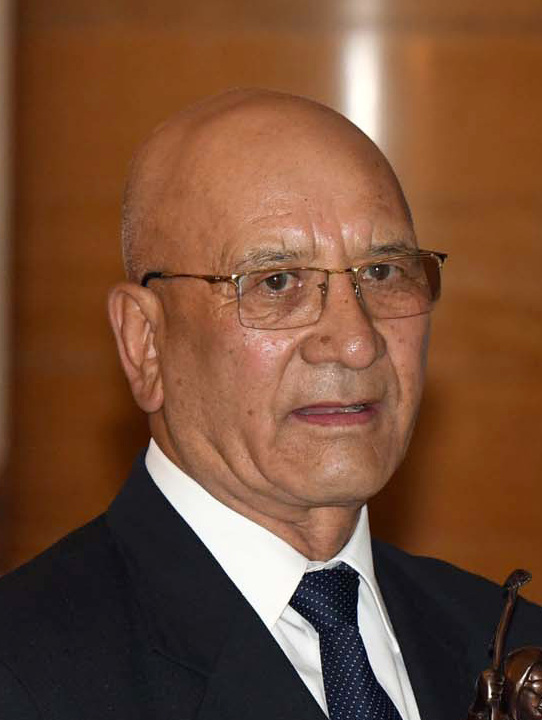
- Wangyal in 2017
- Born: 1942 (age 83–84); Ladakh, India
- Military career
- Allegiance: India
- Awards: Padma Shri; Arjuna Award

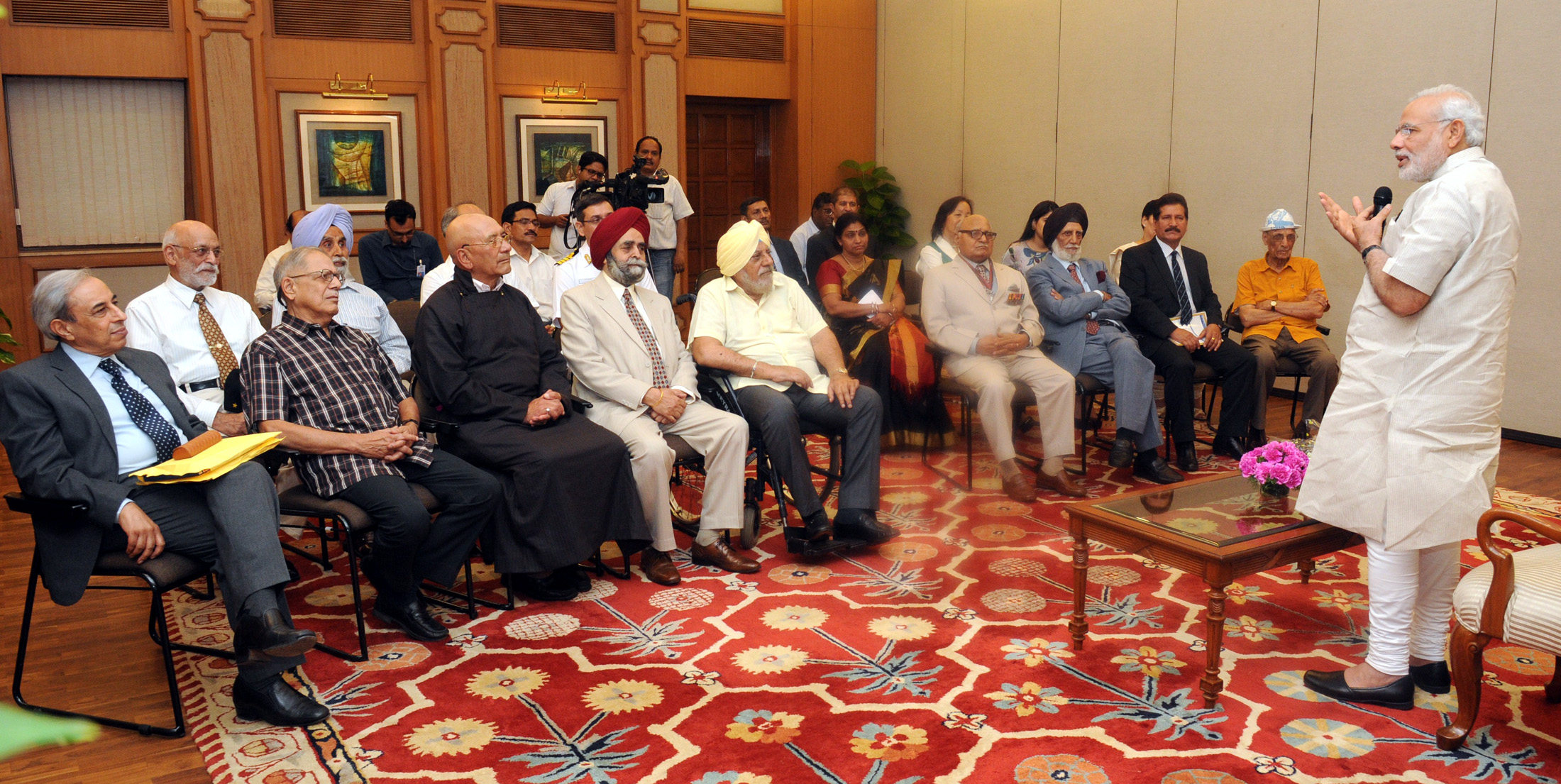
Prime Minister, Shri Narendra Modi meets the members of Indian Everest Expedition 1965 on the occasion of the expedition's Golden Jubilee on 20 May 2015

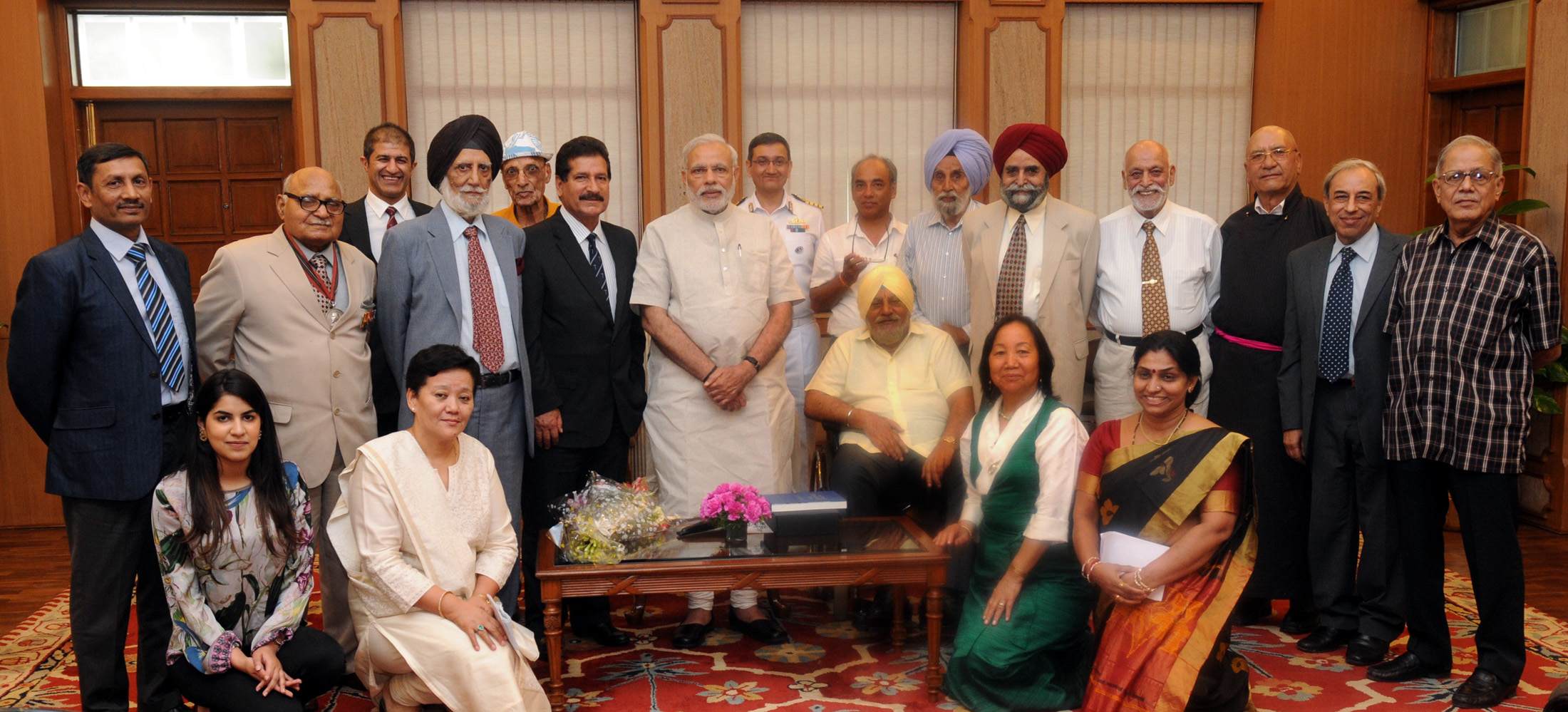
Prime Minister, Shri Narendra Modi meets the members of Indian Everest Expedition 1965 on the occasion of the expedition's Golden Jubilee on 20 May 2015

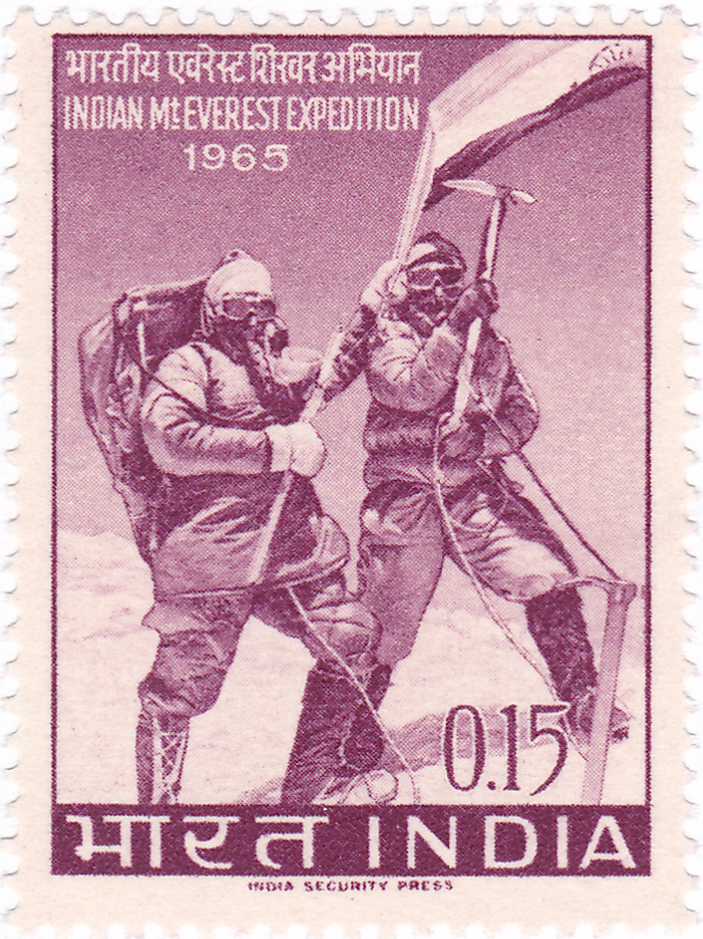
1965 Indian stamp dedicated to the 1965 Everest Expedition

Sonam Wangyal (born 1942) is a former Indian paramilitary personnel and mountaineer who climbed Mount Everest in 1965 at the age 23, making him the youngest summiter. He was one of the nine summiters of the first successful Indian Everest Expeditions that climbed Mount Everest in May 1965 led by Captain M S Kohli. He is the 3rd Indian man, and 18th man in world, to have climbed Mount Everest. On 22 May 1965, the first time that the oldest (Sonam Gyatso at age 42) and the youngest (Sonam Wangyal at age 23) climbed Everest together. Kohli, who had led the 1965 Everest expedition, recruited Wangyal to join a team on a secretive mission to Nanda Devi. The joint CIA / Indian Intelligence Bureau mission involved placing a nuclear listening device on the mountain in 1965 with subsequent visits in 1966 and 1967.

He was politically active and was elected as MLA. In 1975 he also served as a minister of Jammu and Kashmir government. He received the Padma Shri and the Arjuna Award in 1965 and later the Tenzing Norgay National Adventure Award in 2017.

Currently, he is serving as a principal at Sonam Gyatso Mountaineering Institute.

== Honours and awards ==
He was honoured with the Padma Shri in 1965, followed by the Arjuna Award in 1965 and then Tenzing Norgay National Adventure Award 2017 in lifetime achievement category. He served as the Principal of the Sonam Gyatso Mountaineering Institute in Gangtok (Sikkim) from 1976 to 1990. He retired as Assistant Director of the Intelligence Bureau in 1993, and now lives in Leh.

== Hunger strike for Scheduled Tribe status ==
In 1984, Wangyal began a hunger strike in Leh demanding Scheduled Tribe status for the people of Ladakh. The protest lasted five days and attracted attention from the central government. Prime Minister Indira Gandhi travelled to Leh to meet Wangyal during the fast. After discussions and an assurance that the demand would be considered, Wangyal ended the hunger strike by accepting juice from Gandhi. Scheduled Tribe status for Ladakh's communities was later granted in 1989.

== See also ==
- Indian summiters of Mount Everest - Year wise
- List of Mount Everest summiters by number of times to the summit
- List of Mount Everest records of India
- List of Mount Everest records
