= Chhanda Gayen =

Indian mountaineer (1979–2014)

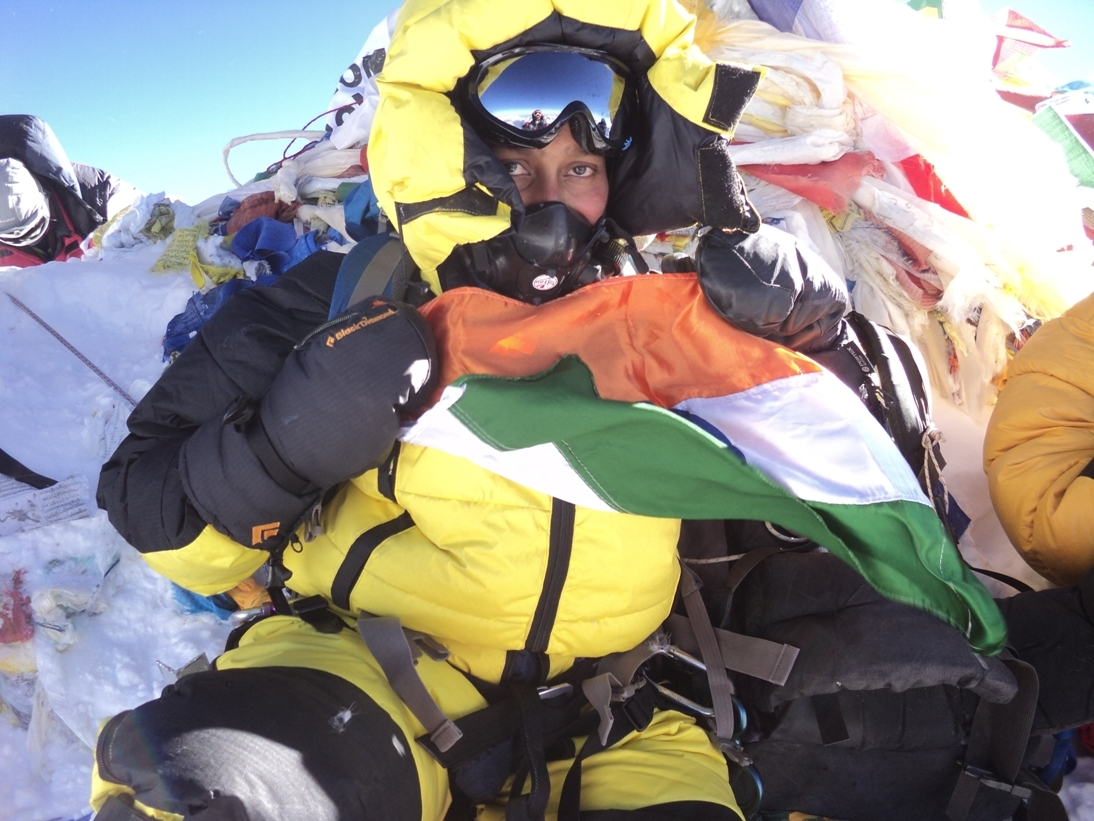
- Gayen at Mt. Everest summit, 2013
- Born: 9 July 1979; Kona, West Bengal, India
- Died: 20 May 2014 (aged 34); Kanchenjunga
- Occupation: Mountaineer
- Known for: Summiting Mount Everest

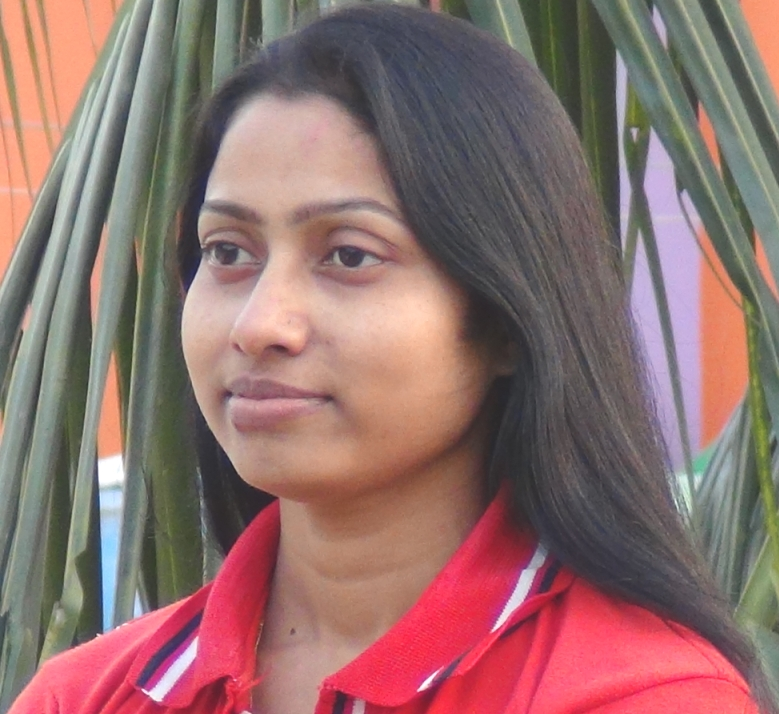
Chhanda Gayen in 2013

Chhanda Gayen (Bengali: ছন্দা গায়েন; 9 July 1979 – 20 May 2014) was an Indian mountaineer and martial artist. She is best known for being the first, and fastest, Indian to climb two eight-thousanders, Mount Everest and Lhotse, in one go, which she did on 18 May 2013. She completed the traverse from the summit of Mount Everest to the summit of Lhotse in 22 hours.

Born in a Bengali family on 9 July 1979, Gayen was awarded "Sera Avishkar" in Sera Bengali 2013 from ABP Ananda, at the age of 34.

== 2014 avalanche ==
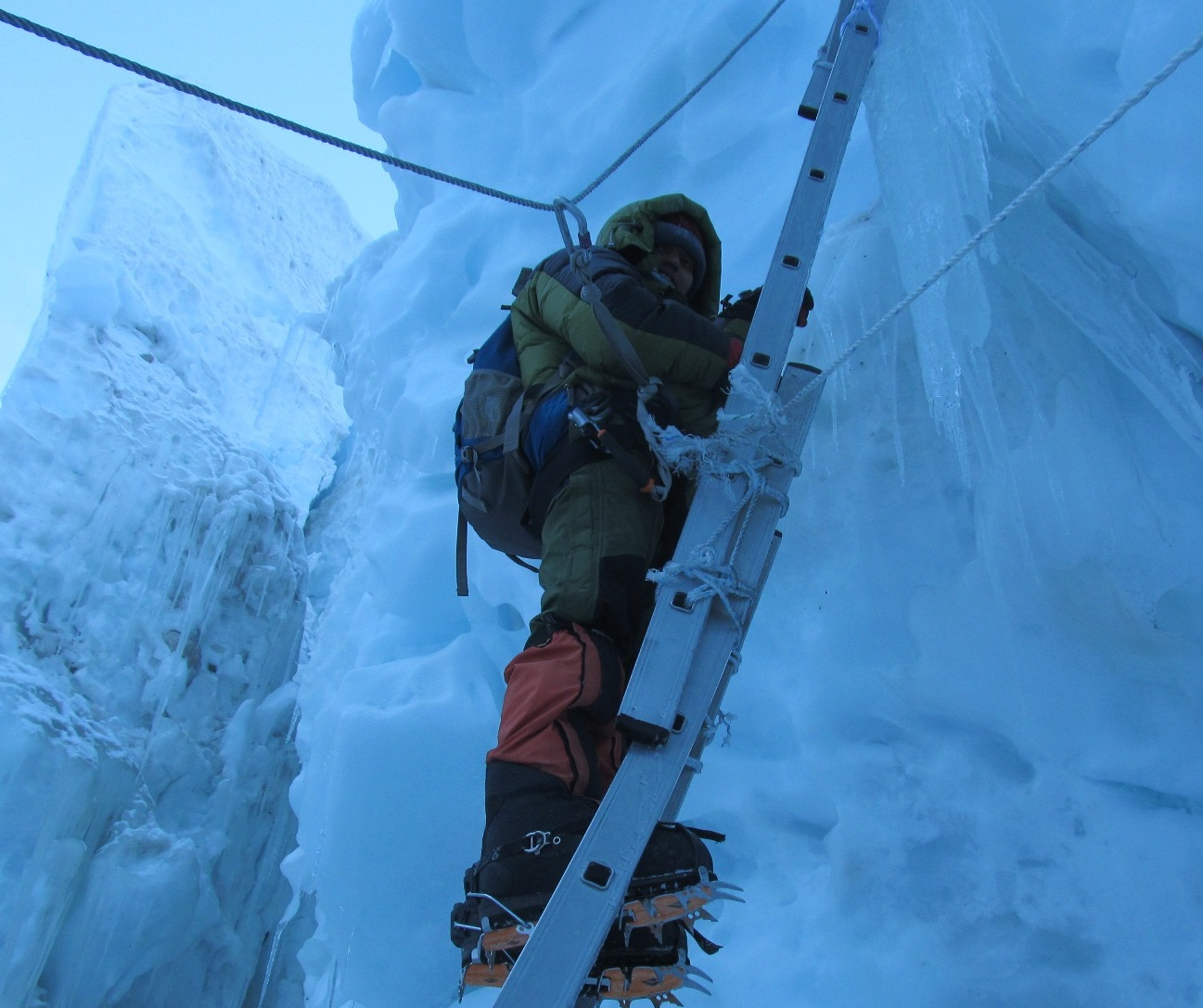
Negotiating crevasse near Khumbu Icefalls

On 20 May 2014, she went missing along with two sherpas in an avalanche while descending from the summit of Kanchenjunga in Nepal. All three of them were later declared to have died in the avalanche.

== See also ==
- Indian summiters of Mount Everest - Year wise
- List of Mount Everest summiters by number of times to the summit
- List of Mount Everest records of India
- List of Mount Everest records
