= Joniawas =

Joniawas, Gurugram
- Sarpanch Smt. Meena Devi
- Location within Haryana Location within India
- Coordinates: 28.394695°N 76.808314°E
- Country: India
- State: Haryana
- Region: North India
- District: Gurgaon district

Government
  - Body: Village panchayat

Population (2019)
  - Total: 2,397
- Time zone: UTC+5:30 (IST)
- PIN: 122504
- Telephone code: 0124
- Vehicle registration: HR76
- Website: www.gurugram.gov.in

Joniawas Gurugram (or Joniawas) is a village in Gurgaon district, Pataudi, Haryana, India. It is 25.1 km from Gurugram on the Farrukhnagar–Jhajjar Road adjacent Farrukhnagar. It is 309 kilometres (192 mi) from the state capital, Chandigarh.

== Education ==
It has a government school and a private school.

== Demographics of 2019 ==
As of 2019 India census, Joniawas had a population of 2397 in 623 households. Males (1247) constitute 51.19% of the population and females (1150) 48.8%. Joniawas has an average literacy (1989) rate of 83%, uppermore than the national average of 74%. There are 1793 voters in the village - 940 male and 853 female.

== Facilities ==
Joniawas has a Government Senior Secondary School, a primary school and big Cricket Ground. There are also temples dedicated to Lord Khatu Shayam Ji, Lord Hanuman and Lord Shiva.

== Adjacent villages ==
- Farukhnagar
- Fazilpur
- Tajnagar
- Heli Mandi
- Tirpari
- Jamalpur
- Khwaspur Babra
- Basunda
- Jataula

== See also ==
- Joniawas (Joniawas) (on Farrukhnagar-Panchgaon road 8.7 kilometres (5.4 mi) from Farrukhnagar town in Gurugram District)
