= Sonam Gyatso (mountaineer) =

Mountaineer

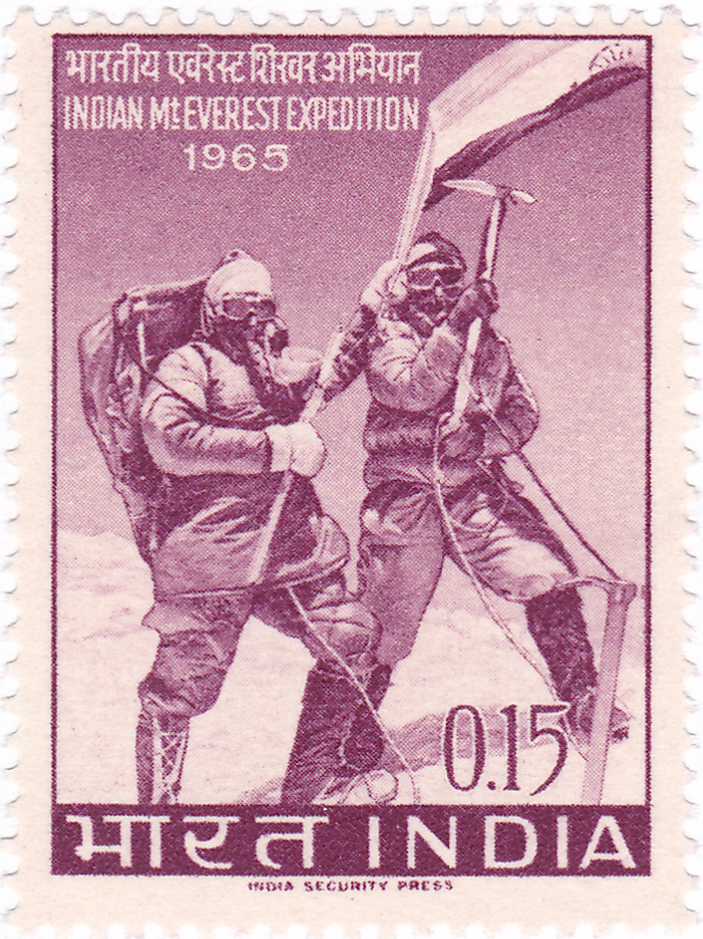
- Everest Expedition 1965 stamp of India
- Born: 1923; Kewzing, Kingdom of Sikkim
- Died: 22 April 1968 (aged 44–45); New Delhi, India
- Occupation: Mountaineer
- Years active: 1946–1968
- Known for: Everest summiting
- Spouse: Kunzang Choden
- Children: 5
- Awards: Padma Bhushan; Padma Shri; Arjuna Award; Indian Mountaineering Foundation Gold Medal; Pema Dorji Award

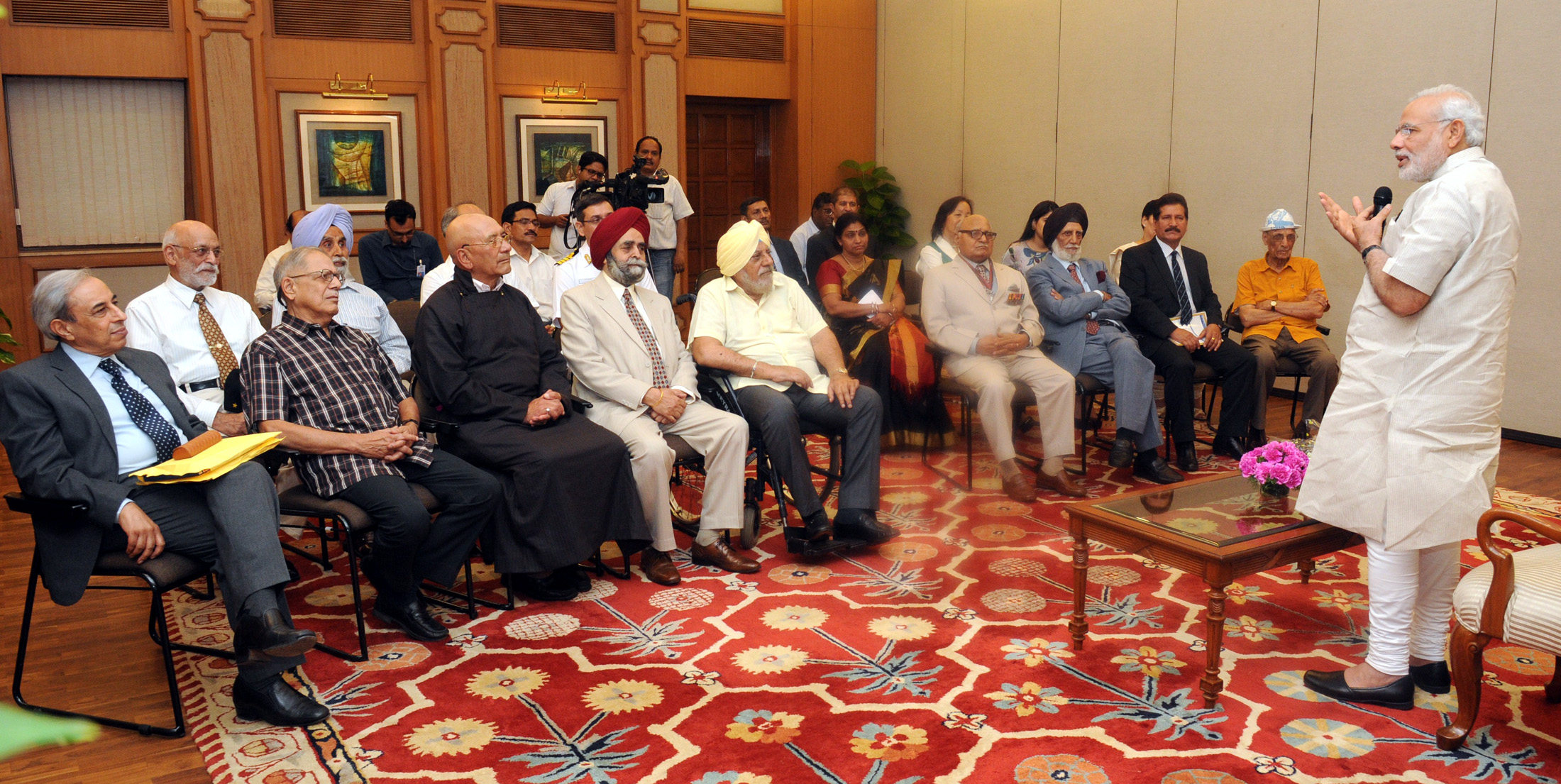
Prime Minister, Shri Narendra Modi meets the members of Indian Everest Expedition 1965 on the occasion of Golden Jubilee of this on 20 May 2015

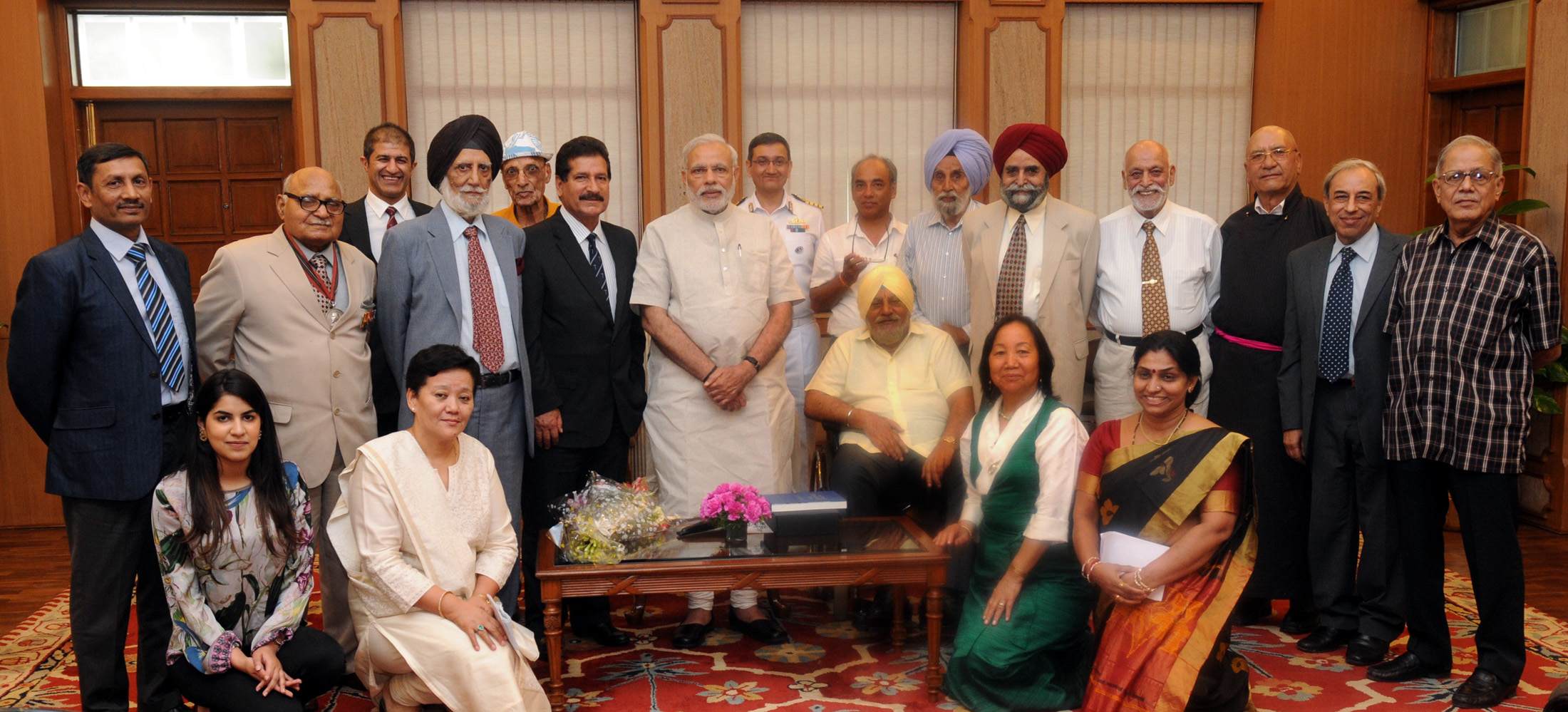
Prime Minister, Shri Narendra Modi meets the members of Indian Everest Expedition 1965 on the occasion of Golden Jubilee of this on 20 May 2015

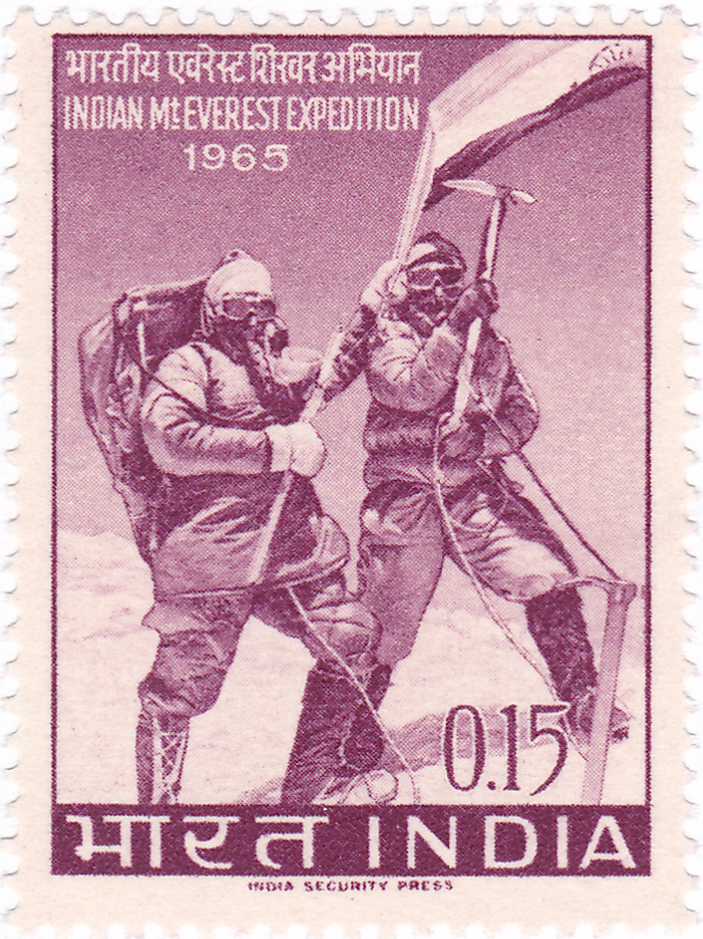
1965 Indian stamp dedicated to the 1965 Everest Expedition

Sonam Gyatso (1923–1968) was an Indian mountaineer. He was the 2nd Indian man, the 17th man in world and first person from Sikkim to summit Mount Everest, the highest peak in the world. He was one of the nine summiters of the first successful Indian Everest Expeditions that climbed Mount Everest in May 1965 led by Captain M S Kohli. The first time that the oldest man at the time, Sonam Gyatso at age 42, and the youngest man Sonam Wangyal at age 23, climbed Everest together on 22 May 1965. He became the oldest person to scale the peak in 1965 and when he spent 50 minutes at the peak, he set a world record for spending the longest time at the highest point on Earth. The Government of India awarded him the third highest honour of the Padma Bhushan, in 1965, for his contributions to the sport of mountaineering.

== Biography ==
Born in 1923 at Kewzing, a south Sikkimese village at the foot of Kangchenjunga in Northeast India, Sonam Gyatso started his career in 1946 as a school teacher at Lachung, in the northern part of the state. After three years of service, he joined the Frontier Constabulary Force of the Indian Air Force as a head constable in 1949 which gave him the opportunity to attend a basic mountaineering course at the Himalayan Mountaineering Institute, Darjeeling in 1954. His first chance at mountaineering came in 1957 when he was selected for the Nanda Devi expedition, but the attempt was unsuccessful. However, he completed his first successful expedition when he scaled the 26,897 ft Cho Oyu peak in 1958, as a member of an all-Indian expedition, the first time an Indian team climbed a peak of that height.

Gyatso followed his Cho Oyu success with several successful climbs such as Annapurna III in 1961, Kanchengyao in 1961, Hathi Parbat in 1963, Rathong peak and Langpo Chung in 1964. In between, he attempted Mount Everest twice, in 1960 and 1962, but could not scale the peak on both attempts, though he reached up to 700 ft and 400 ft to the summit. Subsequently, he attempted Everest through the S Col-SE Ridge route and on 22 May 1965, he reached the summit at the age of 42 as a member of the first all-Indian Everest expedition, thus becoming the first person from Sikkim and the oldest person among all mountaineers to summit the peak. He spent 50 minutes at the top without oxygen supply which was then a world record. His record stood for over 13 years till Pierre Mazeaud summited the peak on 15 October 1978 at the age of 49. The attempt also set another world record for the highest number of successful climbers in a single expedition; the team strength of nine members broke the record set earlier by an American expedition of six members. India Posts issued a postage stamp in commemoration of the achievement. Later, he also scaled the Siniolchu peak.

Kohli, who had led the 1965 Everest expedition, recruited Gyatso to join a team on a secretive mission to Nanda Devi. The joint CIA / Indian Intelligence Bureau mission involved placing a nuclear listening device on the mountain in 1965 with subsequent visits in 1966.

Gyatso was married to Kunzang Choden and the couple had five children. Gyatso was serving as the founder principal of Sonam Gyatso Mountaineering Institute (SGMI) when he died on 22 April 1968 at a hospital in New Delhi, at the age of 45, succumbing to frost bite suffered during one of his trials.

After his death a biography was published 'The Sky Was His Limit: The Life and Climbs of Sonam Gyatso', the author, B.N. Mullik, was the Director of the Indian Intelligence Bureau (IB).

== Awards and honors ==
After two successful expeditions and before his second failed attempt on Everest, the Government of India awarded Gaytso the honor of the Padma Shri in 1962. The government followed it up with the higher award of the Padma Bhushan in January 1965, four months before his successful Everest climb in May. The Government of Sikkim honored him with one of their highest civilian awards, the Pema Dorji Decoration the same year; and he received one more honor, the Arjuna Award from the Ministry of Youth Affairs and Sports, the second highest Indian sports award. He also received the Gold Medal from the Indian Mountaineering Foundation (IMF), in 1960 after his first attempt on Everest. The Old Tibet Road in Gangtok has since been renamed as Sonam Gyatso Marg in his honor. The mountaineering institute in Rathong, Sikkim where he served as the founder principal, is now known as Sonam Gyatso Mountaineering Institute since 1968.

== Notable expeditions ==
Peak	Height	Year	Result	Additional info
Nanda Devi	25,643 ft	1957	failed	first mountaineering attempt
Cho Oyu	26,906 ft	1958	successful	first successful climb
Everest	29,029 ft	1960	failed	reached up to 700 mt to the summit
Annapurna III	24,787 ft	1961	successful	highest climb by an Indian expedition till then
Kanchengyao	22,603 ft	1961	successful	leader of the expedition
Everest	29,029 ft	1962	failed	reached up to 400 mt to the summit
Hathi Parbat	22,070 ft	1963	successful	leader of the expedition
Langpo Chung	21,850 ft	1964	successful	leader of the expedition
Rathong	21,911 ft	1965	successful	pre-Everest trial
Everest	29,029 ft	1965	successful	oldest person to summit the peak
Siniolchu	22,598 ft		successful	

== See also ==
- Mountaineering in India
- Indian summiters of Mount Everest - Year wise
- List of Mount Everest summiters by number of times to the summit
- List of Mount Everest records of India
- List of Mount Everest records
- Tenzing Norgay
- Edmund Hillary
- Bachendri Pal
