= Telangana Social Welfare Residential Educational Institutions Society =

Educational institution in India

Telangana Social Welfare Residential Educational Institutions Society (TGSWREIS) is an educational institution, which organizes about 1,000 Social Welfare Residential Schools in Telangana state by the Government of Telangana, India.

== History ==
Telangana Social Welfare Residential Education Institution Society (TGSWREIS) residential schools and colleges which are started by THE SRI. N. T. RAMA RAO former Chief Minister of united Andhrapradesh Government in 1984 to provide quality education to poor Scheduled Caste, Scheduled Tribe, and Other Backward Caste students by establishing residential schools. At present there are 267 institutions with residential schools, junior and degree colleges with good infrastructure and focus on the all round development of students so that they can face the world with confidence. At present under the state bifurcation policy Andhra Pradesh Social welfare residential Educational Institutions Society has been divided into two separate institutions each in Telangana and Andhra Pradesh respectively. Dr. Repalle Shiva Praveen Kumar IPS was the Secretary of the Telangana Social Welfare Residential Institutions Society. Sri. Ronald Rose, IAS and Dr. E. Naveen Nicolas, IAS who is an alumni have worked as Secretary TSWREIS.

== Background ==
India has undergone many social movements like civil rights, labour/trade movements, women's movement, human rights movement, dalit and tribal movements from last few centuries. Many of them are against the vulnerable social practices which are untouchability, discrimination based on caste, atrocities against the certain sections of dalit, tribal, backward and minority communities. One such community who has always been on the receiving end and have never got the opportunity to live a life of dignity is Dalit. Pre-Independent India has seen great leaders like Mahatma Jyotirao Phule and Dr. B. R. Ambedkar who have given their life for empowerment and equality of Dalit community. Post independence, India has brought in various reforms and welfare programs but many of those are either in paper or at Idea stage.

== Contribution of SR Sankaran ==
One such leader who has brought a revolution and took drastic steps in formulating Pro-poor policies as a bureaucrat is S. R. Sankaran. Though he is born in an upper-class family but his exceptional work especially towards the Dalit and other marginalized community has been appreciated by all over India. He always believed injustice and stigma attached with Dalit can be removed by empowering them with education and creating employment opportunity. During his tenure as Secretary in Social Welfare Department he has brought in various reforms like protection of Dalits and Adivasis under the Prevention of Atrocities Act, improvement and expansion of reservation, poverty alleviation by assigning, distributing and creating employment opportunity for landless, integrated development under various government schemes, releasing bonded labour, conversion to other religion, women issues. In education sector he has brought in major reforms like setting up exclusive schools for Dalits, providing scholarships, developing hostels, colleges. All the untiring, sincere and dedicated work for the downtrodden has got him many awards and recognition but he will always be remembered as "People’s IAS Officer".
