= 65 Medium Regiment (India) =

- Active: 1962 – present
- Country: India
- Allegiance: India
- Branch: Indian Army
- Type: Artillery
- Size: Regiment
- Mottos: Sarvatra, Izzat-O-Iqbal (Everywhere with Honour and Glory)
- Colors: Red & Navy Blue
- Anniversaries: 1 November – Raising Day

Insignia
- Abbreviation: 65 Med Regt

65 Medium Regiment is part of the Regiment of Artillery of the Indian Army.

== Formation and history ==
The regiment was raised as 65 Mountain Regiment on 1 November 1962 at Belgaum, Karnataka. The first commanding officer was Lieutenant Colonel HR Roach, who was the pioneer of the famous Roach equipment, which had been used to fire the 25-pounder guns in arc of 360 degrees in a high angle. The troop composition was of Jat soldiers, the first pure Jat artillery regiment of the Indian Army. The regiment has been subsequently designated as a Field Regiment and is presently a Medium Regiment.

== Operations ==
The regiment has taken part in the following operations –

- North-East Frontier Agency - The regiment, in November 1965, manually handled their guns at the treacherous mountain terrain of Se La. During these operations, the regiment lost Naik Hanuman Singh and Lance Naik Ram Phul Singh.

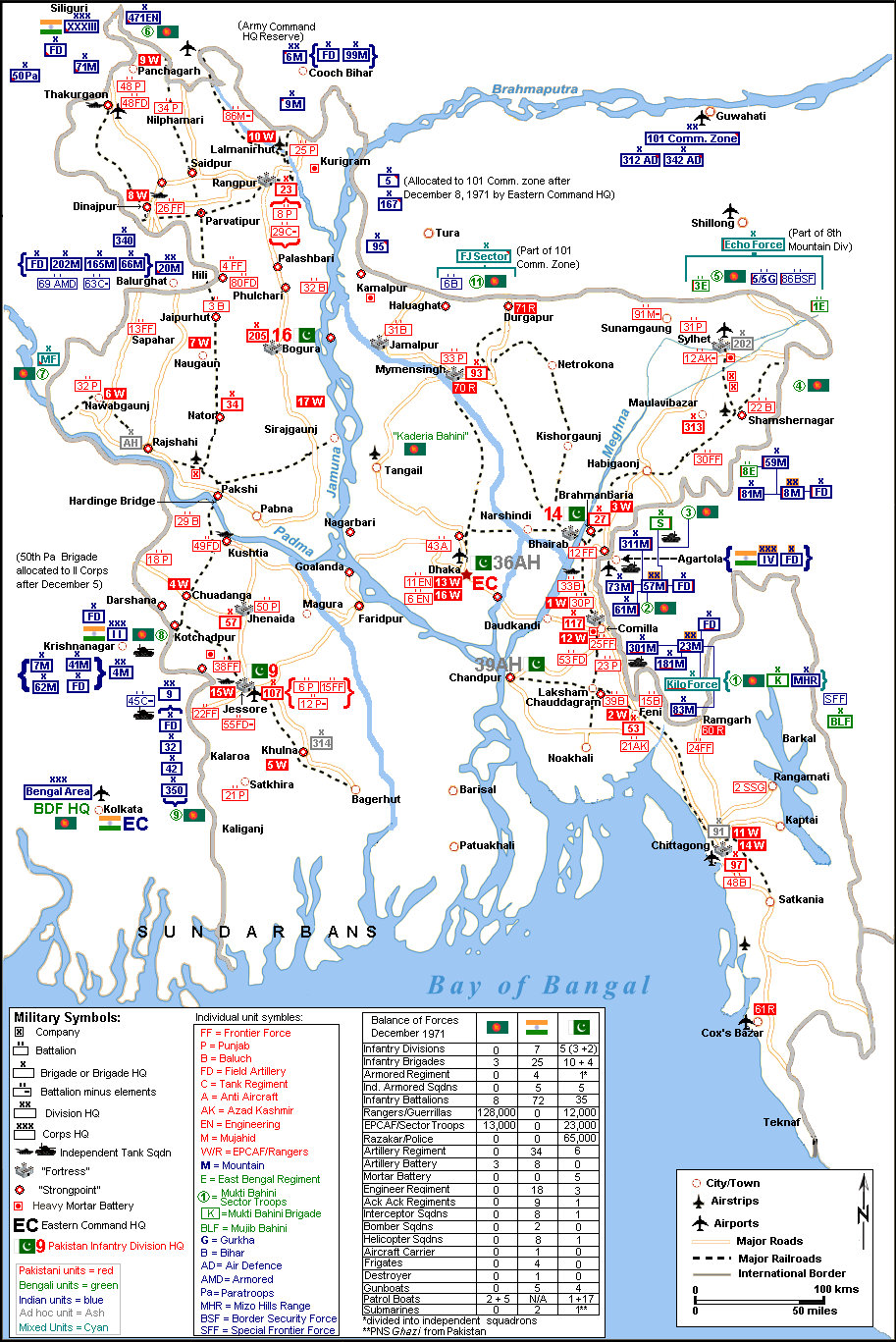
Deployment of troops in the eastern sector during the 1971 war

- Indo-Pakistani War of 1971 – the regiment was commanded by Lieutenant Colonel DS Bahl, equipped with 75/24 Pack Howitzers and was part of Operation Nutcracker and Operation Cactus Lily. On 15 October 1971, prior to the onset of war, the regiment along with 24 Medium Regiment was in support of Mukti Bahini and 10 Bihar in the attempted capture of Saldanodi. It was part of 57 Mountain Division and moved about its guns by dismantling it and transporting it by country boats across the Titas River to support 311 Mountain Brigade's advance towards the Meghna. It also used the Mil Mi-4 helicopters of 110 and 105 Helicopter Units to cross the Meghna towards Dacca. On 14 December, one gun of the regiment was dismantled and carried manually forwards to bombard targets in Dacca and announce the arrival of 57 Division to the gates of the capital. It was the first artillery regiments to enter Dacca along with 4 Guards and 5 Independent Squadron. During the war, the regiment lost Captain K S Sundaram, Gunners Ziley Singh, Iqbal Singh, Dharam Pal and Ram Kumar Singh.

Other operations

- Operation Trident
- Operation Rakshak – counter-terrorist operations in Punjab and Jammu and Kashmir.
- Operation Vyavastha
- Operation Rhino I and II - counter-terrorist operations in Assam – The regiment during its two tenures was successful in apprehending a large number of insurgents. During the operations, it lost Havildar Sahab Singh, Lance Naik Randhir Singh, Gunner Sudesh Kumar and Gunner Ram Niwas.
- Operation Parakram
- Operation Meghdoot – Siachen Glacier, 2016

== Gallantry awards ==
The regiment has won the following gallantry awards –

- GOC-in-C (Eastern Command) Unit Citation – 15 January 2011 for Operation Rhino II.
- Sena Medal – 7 (2nd Lieutenant Sreejith K, Havildar Sahab Singh (posthumous)), Major Gaurav Bhatia, Captain Kelshikar Shamsher Kiran, Lance Naik Rajendra Kumar, Gunner Satyavir, Naib Subedar Rajbir Singh)
- Vishisht Seva Medal (VSM) – 1 (Colonel Ajit Kumar Borah)
- Mentioned in dispatches - 1 (RHM Surendra Singh)
- Chief of Army Staff Commendation Cards – 3
- Vice Chief of Army Staff Commendation cards – 1
- GOC-in-C Commendation cards – 37

== War Cry ==
The war cry of the regiment is चढ़ जा छोरे (Charh-Ja-Chhore). This loosely translates to Go up Boys! or Climb up Boys!.

== Other achievements ==
The regiment has excelled in sports, with Gunner Vibhav Ahlawat representing the Army team in long jump in the 2021 inter-services athletics championships.

== See also ==
- List of artillery regiments of Indian Army
