= Ajeet Bajaj =

Indian explorer

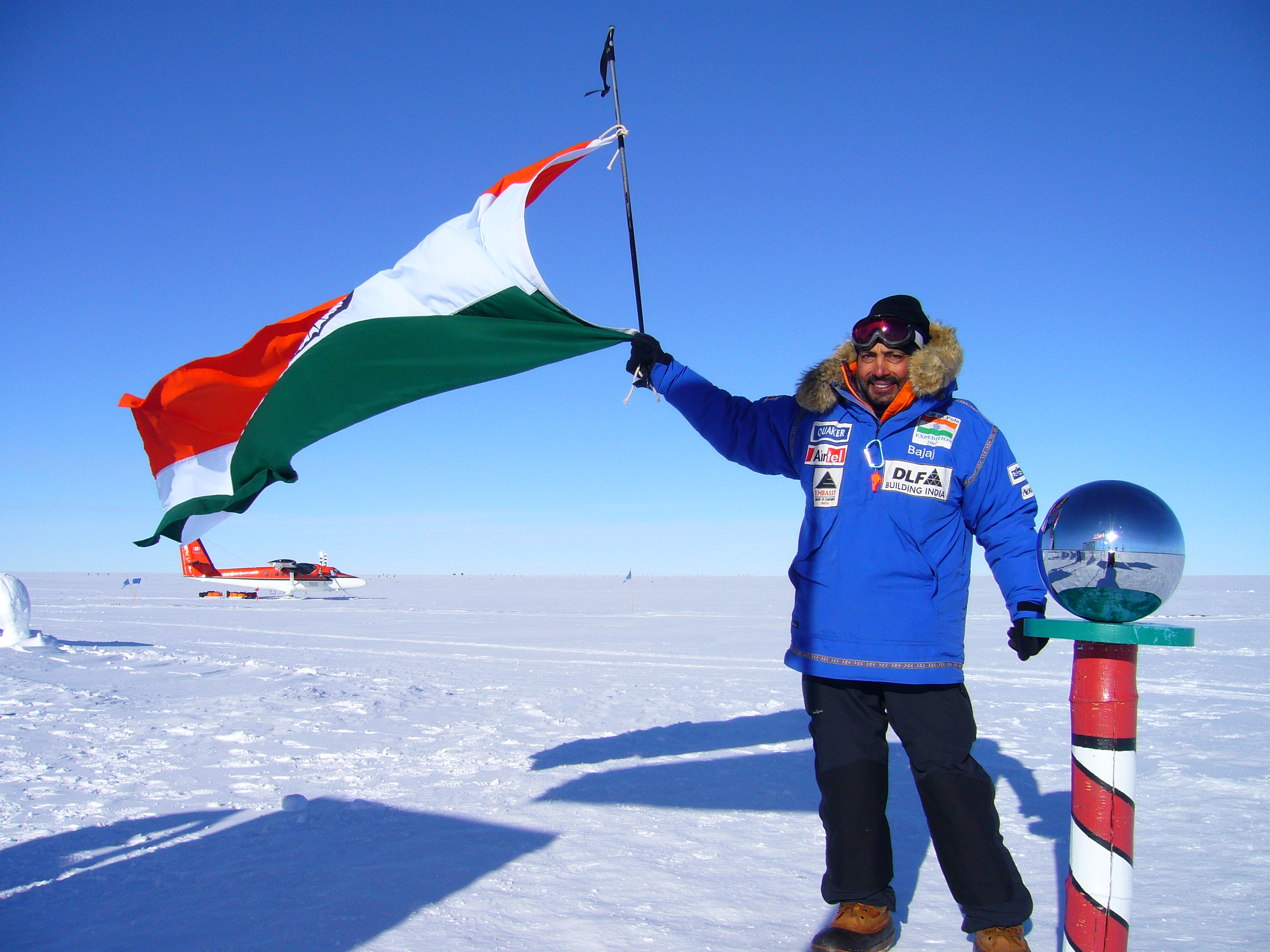
- At South Pole
- Born: 17 September 1965 (age 61)
- Occupation: Adventure sports
- Spouse: Shirly Thomas Bajaj
- Children: Deeya Suzannah Bajaj and Meghna Ann Bajaj
- Parent(s): Jai Dev Bajaj and Satya Bajaj

Ajeet Bajaj (born 17 September 1965) is the first Indian to ski to the North Pole and complete the polar trilogy which entails skiing to the North Pole, South Pole and across the Greenland icecap. Bajaj and his daughter Deeya Bajaj were the first Indian father daughter team to climb Mt. Everest. He completed the Explorer's Grand Slam on 05 June 2022 while completing the Seven Summits with his daughter Deeya.

== Early life and education ==
Bajaj (also affectionately known as "Bagage") completed his schooling at The Lawrence School, Sanawar. At the age of twelve he climbed the 17,353-foot-high (5,289 m) Friendship Peak near Kullu. He graduated from St. Stephen's College, Delhi.

== Adventure ==
Bajaj is the first Indian to have skied to both the North Pole and the South Pole. He has also traveled multiple countries spanning all seven continents. In July 2008 he kayaked along the coast of Greenland as part of an Indo-American team. The expedition's aim was to create awareness about the effect of global warming on glaciers.

Bajaj won a bronze medal in the national games for kayaking. He has received a silver and two bronze medals in international rafting competitions in Switzerland and Siberia, Russia. He has captained an international team for world white water championships in Turkey.

Bajaj qualified as a climbing instructor at the French National School of Alpinism and Skiing and has experience in a host of other adventure sports including skiing, rock climbing, snorkeling, sea kayaking, scuba diving, bungee jumping and canyoning.

He is a Fellow of the Royal Geographical Society and is former President of the Adventure Tour Operators Association of India.

Bajaj along with his daughter Deeya climbed Mount Everest on 16 May 2018. This made them the first father - daughter duo to do so. They climbed Denali, the last of their Seven Summits on 05 June 2022, becoming the first Asian father-daughter duo to climb the Seven Summits.

== Achievements ==
- Chief Instructor for kayaking course conducted for instructors of Nehru Institute of Mountaineering, Uttarkashi, India.
- Course director for River Running courses conducted for the National Institute of Water Sports, Goa, India.
- Leader of first descent expeditions on the Nubra, Shyok, Ravi and Beas rivers in India.
- Leader of rafting expeditions on Indus, Zanskar, Yamuna, Bhagirathi, Mandakini and Alaknanda rivers for the Indian Army. First descent by Kayak of upper Yamuna.
- Expedition leader and chief instructor for forty-five river running courses and expeditions for the Indian Armed Forces. Many of these expeditions were on uncharted rivers in the Himalayas.
- Joint leader of Indo-U.S. Kali-Sarda River Expedition (first descent) – 1987.
- Technical Director for Four Square International White Water Challenge 2001, India.
- Former President, Indian Association of Professional Rafting Outfitters of India.
- Member of executive committee Nehru Institute of Mountaineering.
- Awarded Padma Shri in 2012

== See also ==
- Indian summiters of Mount Everest - Year wise
- List of Mount Everest summiters by number of times to the summit
- List of Mount Everest records of India
- List of Mount Everest records
