= Fazilpur, Uttar Pradesh =

Fazilpur
- Village
- Location within Uttar Pradesh Location within India
- Coordinates: 28°30′33″N 79°35′42″E
- Country: India
- State: Uttar Pradesh
- Named after: Mohd Faazil

Population (census 2011)
  - Total: 2,194

Languages
  - Official: Hindi
- Time zone: UTC+5:30 (IST)
- Nearest city: Nawabganj, Bareilly
- Literacy: 56%
- Climate: Cold (Köppen)

Fazilpur is a large village located in Nawabganj of Bareilly district, Uttar Pradesh.
