= Siniolchu =

Mountain in India

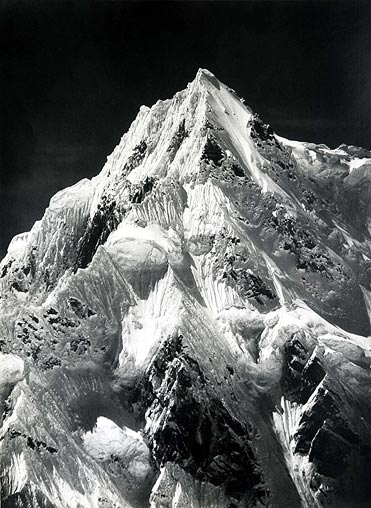
- Siniolchu taken from the Zemu Glacier by Vittorio Sella

Highest point
- Elevation: 6,888 m (22,598 ft)
- Prominence: 1,480 m (4,860 ft)
- Coordinates: 27°42′41″N 88°19′04″E

Geography
- Location within India
- Location: Sikkim, India
- Parent range: Himalayas

Climbing
- First ascent: 1936
- Easiest route: glacier/snow/ice climb

Siniolchu is one of the tallest mountains of the Indian state of Sikkim. The 6,888 metres (22,598 ft) mountain is considered to be particularly aesthetically attractive, having been described by Douglas Freshfield as "the most superb triumph of mountain architecture and the most beautiful snow mountain in the world". It is situated near the green lake adjacent to Kangchenjunga.

== Climbing history ==
Siniolchu's summit was first scaled in 1936 by the German climbers Karl Wien and Adi Göttner. Later Sikkimese Everest climber Sonam Gyatso also scaled the top and Ladakhi Everest climber Sonam Wangyal also ascended the peak.
