= List of Mount Everest records of India =

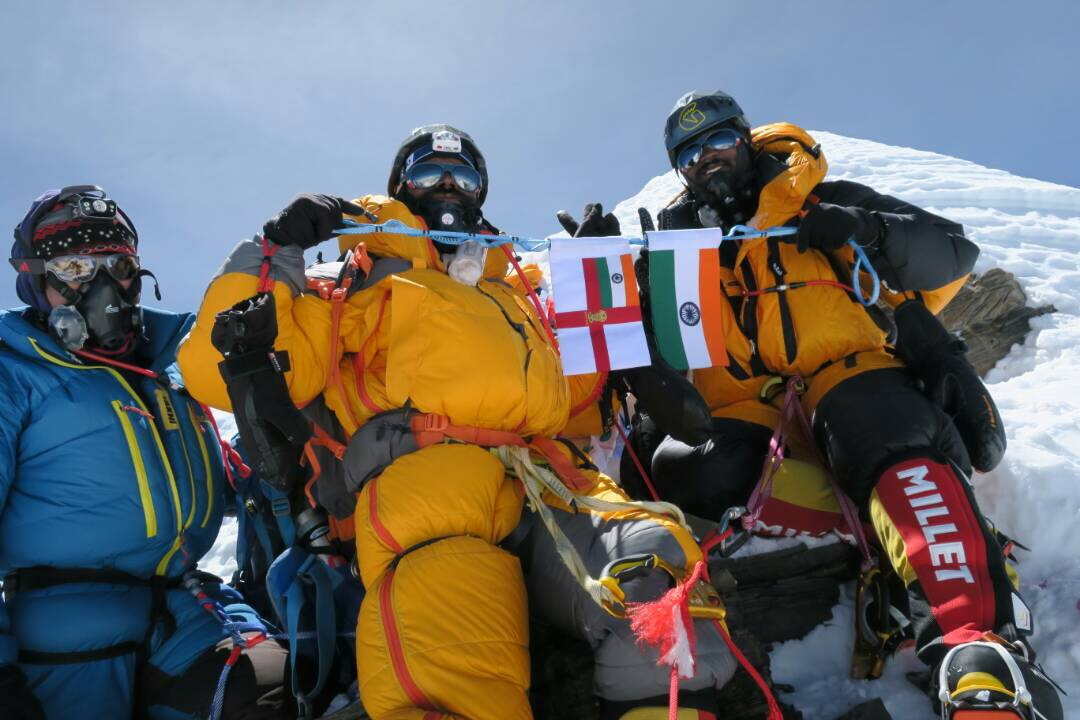
Indian Navy expedition on the Everest summit, 2017

This is list of Mount Everest records of Indian nationals have achieved.

== Records ==
- In 1984, Bachendri Pal became the first Indian woman to reach the summit of Mount Everest
- Phu Dorjee (d. 1987) in 1984 became the first Indian to make a solo ascent of Mount Everest and also the first to climb without supplemental oxygen.
- Santosh Yadav - the first Indian woman to summit twice (1992 and 1993)
- Premlata Agarwal - the first Indian woman mountaineer to complete the Seven Summits and one of the oldest Indian women mountaineers to summit Mount Everest, at age 48, in 2011
- Chhanda Gayen became the first Indian to climb to the summit of any two Eight-thousanders - Mount Everest and Mount Lhotse in one go on 18 May 2013. She completed the traverse the summit of Mount Everest to the summit of Mount Lhotse in 22 hours.
- Tashi and Nungshi Malik became the first female twins to scale Mount Everest on 19 May 2013.
- Ajeet Bajaj and Deeya Bajaj became the first father-daughter team to climb Mount Everest from India, on May 16, 2018. They are the first father-daughter team in the world to climb the North Side of Mount Everest.
- 53-year-old Sangeeta Sindhi Bahl, a Miss India finalist in 1985, became the oldest Indian woman to scale the world's highest peak on May 19, 2018.
- Love Raj Singh Dharmshaktu - climbed Mount Everest seven times.
- Ajeet Bajaj and Deeya Bajaj became the first father-daughter team to climb Mount Everest from India. They are the first father-daughter team to climb the North Side of Mount Everest.

== International records by Indians ==
Record name	Age	Person	Date	Ref.
First woman to summit twice		Santosh Yadav	1992, 1993	
Youngest female to climb Mount Everest	13 years and 11 months	Malavath Purna	25 May 2014	
Youngest woman up to Summit Everest up to that time	19 years 35 days	Dicky Dolma	10 May 1993	
Youngest woman to summit up to that time	24 years, 215 days	Santosh Yadav	12 May 1992	
Youngest woman to summit up to that time	30 years 28 days	Bachendri Pal	23 May 1984	
Oldest person to climb Mount Everest from North side and oldest civilian to climb Mount Everest up to that time	52 years	Debabrata Mukherjee (b 1962)	25 May 2014	
Oldest person to climb Mount Everest from South up to that time	56 years	S C Negi Additional DIG BSF (b 8 March 1950)	24 May 2006	
Oldest person to climb Mount Everest up to that time	42 years, 6 months	Sonam Gyatso (b 1922)	22 May 1965	
First person to reach the summit from three different routes (South Col, North Col and Kangshung Face)		Kushang Sherpa	1993- 2003	
First twins to climb Mount Everest together		Tashi and Nungshi Malik	May 19, 2013	
Female amputee (one leg), summitted		Arunima Sinha	May 21, 2013	
Youngest person to trek to Everest Base Camp on foot	3 Years & 7 months	Heyansh Kumar	23 April 2022	
First dual ascent made by a woman on Mount Everest's summit within five days		Anshu Jamsenpa	21 May 2017	
Youngest girl to trek to Everest Base Camp (Nepal)	5	Prisha Lokesh	20 June 2023	
Largest expedition to reach the summit of Everest	49 people (22 Indian Army)	Indian Army Adventure Wing Led: Lt Col Manoj Josh	27 May 2025	

== See also ==
- Indian summiters of Mount Everest - Year wise
- List of Mount Everest records
- Everest (Indian TV series)
