= Fazilpur Jharsa =

- Village
- Location in Haryana, India Fazilpur Jharsa (India)
- Country: India
- State: Haryana
- Division: Gurgaon
- District: Gurgaon
- Founder: Jitendra Rao

Languages
  - Official: Hindi
- Time zone: UTC+5:30 (IST)
- PIN: 122101
- ISO 3166 code: IN-HR
- Vehicle registration: HR-26,98
- Website: haryana.gov.in

Fazilpur Jharsa is a village in the Gurgaon mandal of Gurgaon district in the state of Haryana in India. It is located on the Sohna Road. This location offers a wide variety of rental apartments. Shri Mangal Bhawan apartments offer affordable housing for families, single women, and working couples in this area.
