= Deeya Suzannah Bajaj =

Indian adventure sports athlete

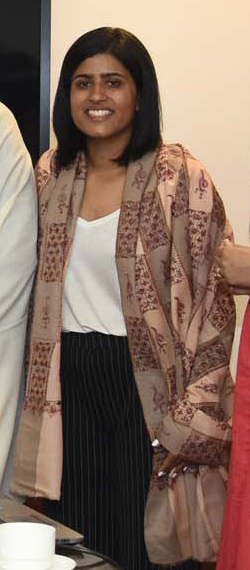
- Deeya Suzannah Bajaj in July 2018
- Born: 9 March 1994 (age 32)
- Education: Cornell University; Wharton School of the University of Pennsylvania
- Occupations: Mountaineer, explorer, motivational speaker, adventure tourism
- Parent(s): Shirly Bajaj and Ajeet Bajaj
- Relatives: Meghna Ann Bajaj (sister)

Deeya Suzannah Bajaj (born 9 March 1994) is an Indian adventure sports athlete. She completed the Seven Summits on 5 June 2022.

== Biography ==
Bajaj is the daughter of Shirly Thomas Bajaj and Ajeet Bajaj (Indian adventurer and Padma Shri awardee). She is a PADI certified rescue diver and has completed an advance course in mountaineering from the Nehru Institute of Mountaineering.

== Adventure ==
At the age of 17, Bajaj participated in a 550 km long cross country skiing expedition, where she skied across the Greenland Icecap to raise funds for a children's home. She was the youngest in the world at the time to have completed the expedition.

On 16 May 2018 Bajaj and her father became the first Indian father-daughter duo to climb Mount Everest. They are also the first parent-child team to have climbed Everest from the North Side (Tibet). The climb was undertaken to support the cause of the girl child in India. The father-daughter team has climbed all of the Seven Summits including Mount Everest, Denali, Aconcagua, Vinson, Elbrus, Kilimanjaro, Mont Blanc, Puncak Jaya and Mount Kosciuszko.

== Awards ==
- Meri Dilli Award in the category "Adventure Sports" 2012
- TiE (The IndUS Entrepreneurs) Aspire Young Achievers Award ‘In appreciation of unrivalled contributions as a role model for the Youth of India’ 2012
- Adventure Tour Operators Association Of India "Adventurer Of the Year" 2013
