= R. S. Praveen Kumar =

Indian police officer

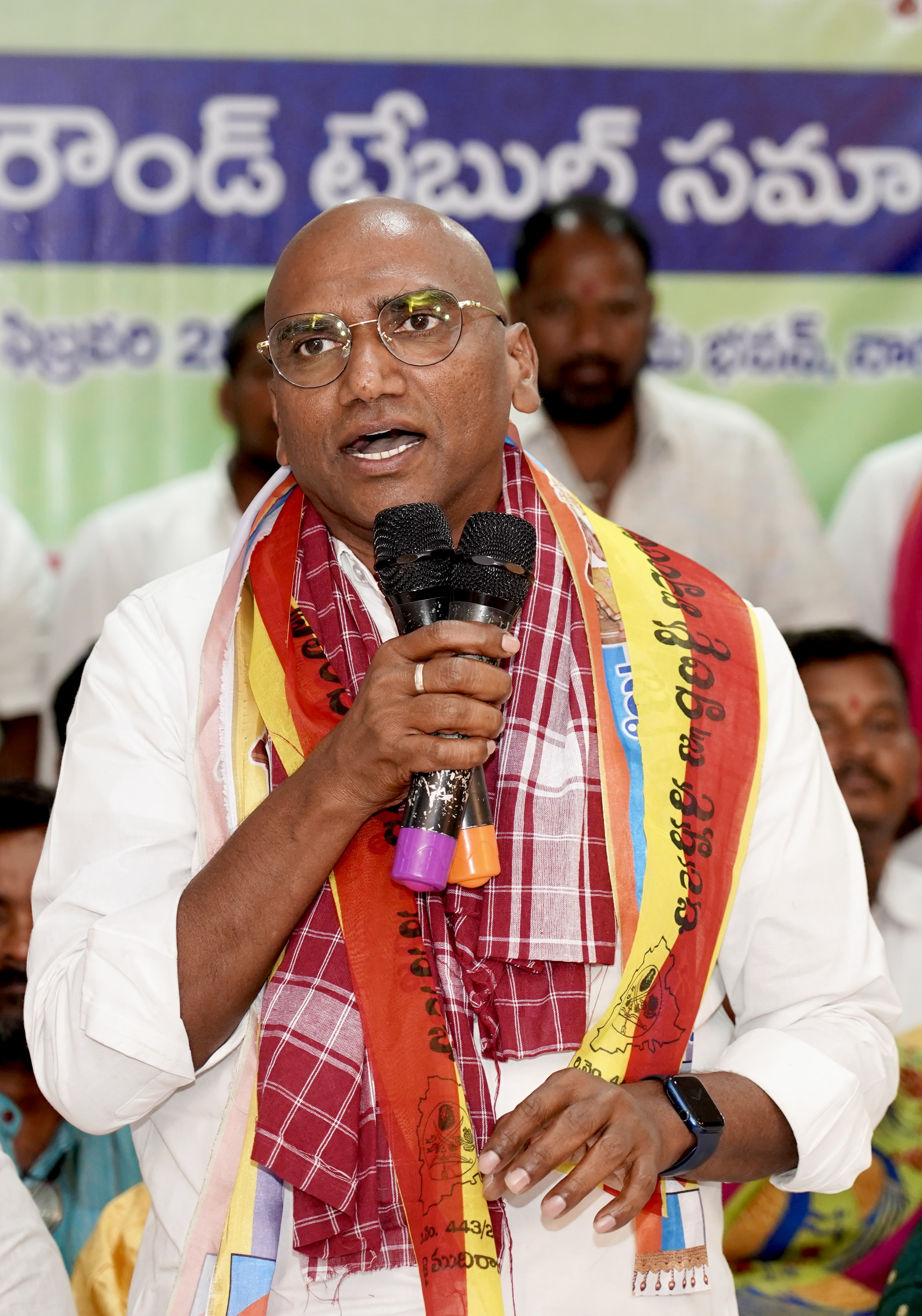
- Born: Repalle Shiva Praveen Kumar; 23 November 1967 (age 58); Alampur, Jogulamba Gadwal district, Telangana, India
- Education: B. V. Sc. (APAU), M. V. Sc. (APAU), M. P. A. (Harvard)
- Alma mater: Andhra Pradesh Agricultural University, Hyderabad, Harvard Kennedy School, Cambridge, Massachusetts
- Political party: Bharat Rashtra Samithi (2024 March 18 - present)
- Other political affiliations: Bahujan Samaj Party (2021 August 8 - 2024 March 16)
- Police career
- Country: India
- Department: Telangana Police
- Service years: Indian Police Service, 1995-2021
- Status: Retired voluntarily
- Rank: Additional Director General of Police
- Badge no.: Regular Recruit of 48th batch
- Awards: President's Police Medal for meritorious service, Telangana Excellence Award
- Other work: Secretary, Telangana Social Welfare Residential Educational Institutions Society (2013-2021)

Repalle Shiva Praveen Kumar (born 23 November 1967) is a former officer of Indian Police Service who served as the secretary of Telangana Social Welfare Residential Educational Institutions Society and Telangana Tribal Welfare Residential Educational Institutions Society.

After resigning from his government job, he joined Bahujan Samaj Party, with a calling that it was time "Dalits and Bahujans strive to achieve political power" in the state. He lost from Sirpur constituency in the 2023 Telangana Legislative Assembly election and later he resigned from BSP on 16 March 2024 accusing the BJP of attempting to disrupt the BRS and BSP's alliance for upcoming 2024 Lok Sabha polls, including resorting to arresting BRS MLC K Kavitha was unacceptable.

RS Praveen Kumar joined Bharat Rashtra Samiti (BRS) on 18 March 2024 in the presence of BRS president K. Chandrashekar Rao.

== Early life ==
Praveen pursued studies in veterinary science from Andhra Pradesh Agricultural University, his faculty included Professor T. D. J. Nagabhushanam, among others. He belongs to the Indian Police Service batch of 1995. He holds a master's degree in Public Administration from Harvard University's Kennedy School under a Edward S Mason fellowship.

== Career ==
During Praveen Kumar's tenure as the secretary of TSWREIS and TTWREIS, these residential schools being run for students belonging to marginalised sections has scripted many success stories and concentrated on wholesome personality development of the students. He held the role for about 10 years.

On 19 July 2021, he announced voluntary retirement and resigned from his post as secretary of TSWREIS and TTWREIS.

== Transformation of Social Welfare Residential Schools ==
Praveen Kumar introduced P5 Model into Social Welfare Residential Schools. In this model, he added several innovative and path breaking programmes like E-Plus Clubs, Voice for Girls, Horse riding, film making, music, dance, water sports, mountaineering, Ignitor, W Plus Clubs, Impact, etc., for holistic development of the children. During his tenure TSWREI students had successfully launched two payloads Swaero Sat 1 and Swaero Sat 2. The SWAEROSAT-1 was designed to study cosmic radiation and ozone layer concentration at various altitudes. Swaero Sat 2 is an experimental payload built to study atmospheric pollutants like methane gas and carbon monoxide, and also radiation and temperature levels.

== SWAEROES ==
Praveen Kumar is the founder and the guiding force to launch a payback movement called SWAEROES. Where SWAEROES stands for Social Welfare Aeroes (Greek for sky), it means that sky is the limit and there is no reverse gear or no looking back or no slowing down. Swaeroes student not only focused in academics and focusing success in arts, cultural programs, sports and games. Springer Publications has published the work of Praveen Kumar in its series Empowering Teachers to Build a Better World. His work is selected as one among the six nations shortlisted across the world.

=== Criticism by right-wing groups ===
In March 2021, a video went viral during an oath ceremony of a Swaero movement held at Dhulikatta Buddhist Shrine in Peddapalli district. In the video Praveen Kumar was seen repeating "Budha Vandanam", vows taken by B. R. Ambedkar when he converted to Buddhism, which include denouncing faith in certain Hindu gods. The video was circulated and he was criticised by right-wing groups. Telangana BJP politicians and Vishva Hindu Parishad members accused him of spreading sentiments against Hinduism among students using the Swaero movement. Praveen Kumar defended against the accusations and issued a statement saying Swaeroism is an inclusive ideology and they don't teach any prejudice against any religion. The statement also stated that they work for just and equal society in the country only through education, health awareness, scientific thinking and economic empowerment, not through hatred.

== Politics ==
With a calling that it was time "to be the uncompromising voice for the suppressed" in the state, on 8 August 2021, leaving six and a half years of service, Kumar joined Bahujan Samaj Party,. He lost from Sirpur constituency in the 2023 legislative assembly elections. on 16 March 2024 he has resigned from the party amidst reported pressure from the Bharatiya Janata Party (BJP) to Bahujan Samaj Party to severe ties with the Bharat Rashtra Samithi (BRS) . He subsequently contested the 2024 Indian general election from the Nagarkurnool (Lok Sabha constituency) as a candidate of the Bharat Rashtra Samithi, finishing third behind Mallu Ravi of the Indian National Congress and Bharath Prasad Pothuganti of the Bharatiya Janata Party.

== Awards and honours ==
Kumar has been awarded the President's Police Medal for meritorious and also awarded the Telangana Excellence Award by the government of Telangana on the eve of the 71st India's Independence Day.
