= Mount Everest in popular culture =

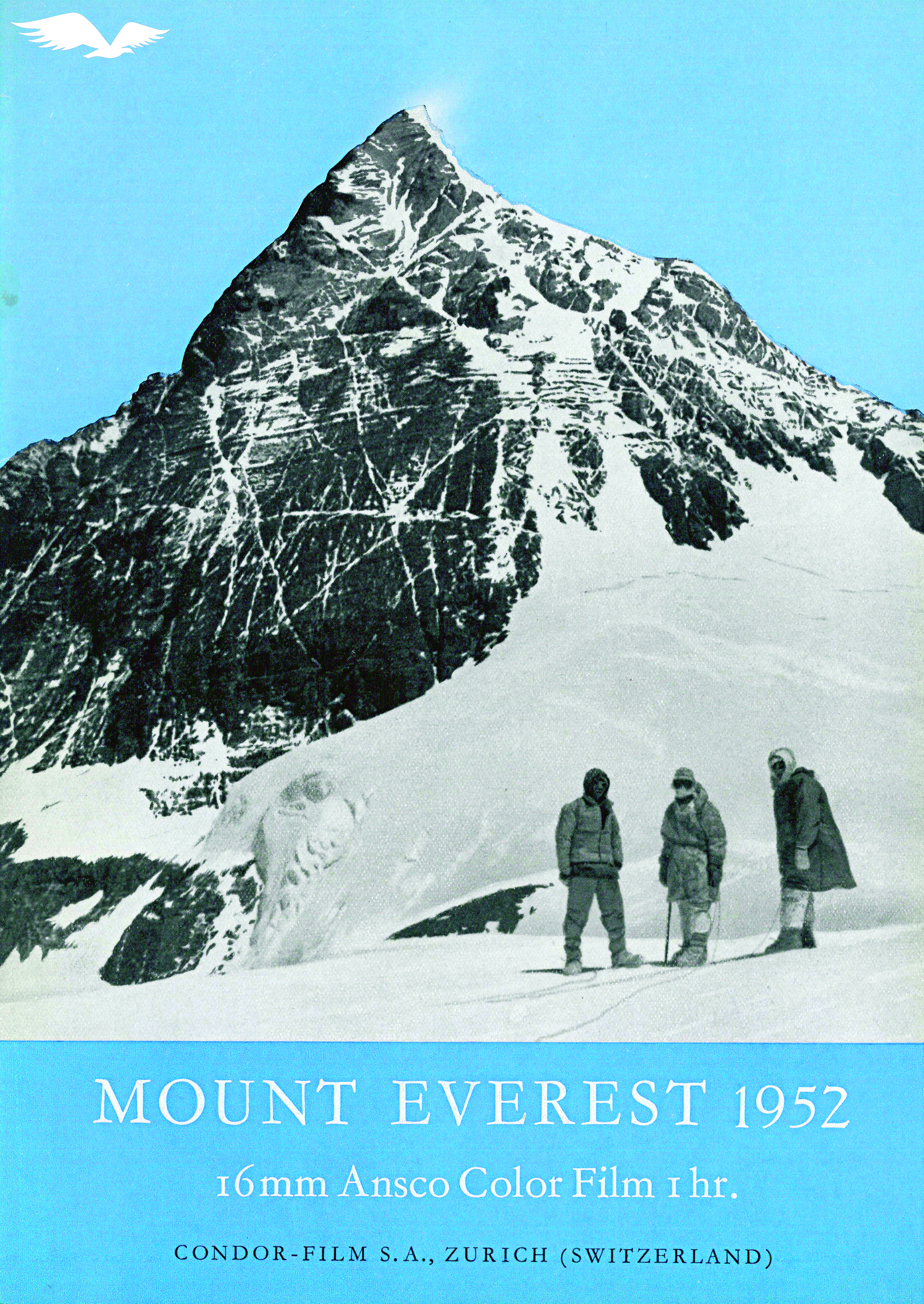
Film poster for the 1952 Swiss documentary

This is a list of media content related to Mount Everest, the Earth's highest mountain, with an elevation of 8,848 metres (29,029 ft) above sea level. Mount Everest was identified as such in the 19th century as a result of a geographical survey conducted by the British Empire. A century later it was climbed, after some infamous attempts in the preceding decades.

During the 20th and 21st centuries, the notoriety of Mount Everest increased and it became a common subject of novels and films, often focusing on particular expeditions or events at the mountain. For example, the 1998 film Everest was the highest grossing IMAX film up to that time, and some novels in the genre have sold millions of copies.

== Books ==
=== Non-fiction ===
Title	Author	Year of publication	Notes
A Day to Die For	Graham Ratcliffe	2011	about 1996 Mount Everest disaster
A Life on the Edge: Memoirs of Everest and Beyond	Jim Whittaker	1999	
After the Wind: 1996 Everest Tragedy – One Survivor's Story	Lou Kasischke	2014	about 1996 Mount Everest disaster
Aftershock	Jules Mountain	2017	2015 Mount Everest avalanches
Ascent into Hell	Fergus White	2017	
Blind Descent: Surviving Alone and Blind on Mount Everest	Brian Dickinson (climber)	2014	about 2011 season
Climbing High: A Woman's Account of Surviving the Everest Tragedy	Lene Gammelgaard	2000	about 1996 Mount Everest disaster
Crystal Horizon: Everest: The First Solo Ascent	Reinhold Messner	1989	about 1978 and 1980 solo summits
Dark Summit	Nick Heil	2008	About 2006 season
Dead Lucky	Lincoln Hall (climber)	2007	About his first summit in 2006 season
Everest 1922: The Epic Story of the First Attempt on the World's Highest Mountain	Mick Conefrey	2022	about 1922 British Mount Everest expedition
Everest 1953: The Epic Story of the First Ascent	Mick Conefrey	2012	about 1953 British Mount Everest expedition
Everest: Alone at the Summit	Stephen Venables	2018	about 1988 season
Everest: It's Not About the Summit	Ellis Stewart	2016	
Everest: Mountain without Mercy	Broughton Coburn	1997	photobook about 1996 Mount Everest disaster
Everest, the west ridge	Tom Hornbein	1965	about 1963 American Mount Everest expedition
Everest - The First Ascent: The Untold Story of Griffith Pugh, the Man who made it possible	Harriet Tuckey	2013	about 1952 British Cho Oyu expedition, 1953 British Mount Everest expedition and 1960–61 Silver Hut expedition
Everest the Hard Way	Chris Bonington	1976	about 1975 British Mount Everest Southwest Face expedition
Everest: The Unclimbed Ridge	Chris Bonington, Charles Clarke	1984	
Facing Up: A Remarkable Journey to the Summit of Mt Everest	Bear Grylls	2000	
Fallen: George Mallory, the man, the myth, the legend	Mick Conefrey	2024	about 1924 British Mount Everest expedition
Ghosts of Everest: The Search for Mallory & Irvine	Jochen Hemmleb	1999	about 1924 British Mount Everest expedition
Going Up is Easy	Lydia Bradey	2015	
High Adventure: The True Story of the First Ascent of Everest	Edmund Hillary	1955	about 1953 British Mount Everest expedition
High Crimes: the Fate of Everest in an Age of Greed	Michael Kodas	2008	
High Exposure: An Enduring Passion for Everest and Unforgiving places	David Breashears	1999	
Into Thin Air	Jon Krakauer	1997	about 1996 Mount Everest disaster
Into the Silence	Wade Davis	2011	about 1922 British Mount Everest expedition
Just for the Love of it: The First Woman to Climb Mount Everest from Both Sides	Cathy O'Dowd, foreword by Ranulph Fiennes	2000	
Last Hours on Everest	Graham Hoyland	2013	about 1924 British Mount Everest expedition
Left for Dead	Beck Weathers	2000	about 1996 Mount Everest disaster
Master of Thin Air: Life and Death on the World's Highest Peaks	Andrew Lock	2015	about David Sharp's death on Everest in 2006
One Man's Everest	Kenton Cool	2015	
No Summit out of Sight	Jordan Romero	2014	
See You Tomorrow	Jeremy Evans	2021	About Marco Siffredi snowboarding Everest in 2001 and 2002
The Assault on Mount Everest, 1922: Special Centenary Edition	C. G. Bruce	2022	about 1922 British Mount Everest expedition
The Boys of Everest: Chris Bonington and the Tragedy of Climbing's Greatest Generation	Clint Willis	2006	about Chris Bonington
The Climb	Anatoli Boukreev	1997	about 1996 Mount Everest disaster
The Fear Bubble	Ant Middleton	2019	about 2018 season
The Fight for Everest 1924	E. F. Norton	2015	about 1924 British Mount Everest expedition
The Hunt for Mount Everest	Craig Storti	2021	about 1921 and prior
The Longest Climb: The Last Great Overland Quest	Dominic Faulkner	2010	
The Lost Explorer: Finding Mallory on Mt. Everest	Conrad Anker	1999	about 1924 British Mount Everest expedition and Mallory and Irvine Research Expedition
The Mammoth Book of Everest	Jon E. Lewis	2015	Anthology
The Moth and the Mountain: A True Story of Love, War and Everest	Ed Caesar	2020	about Maurice Wilson's ascent in 1934
The Mountain: My Time on Everest	Ed Viesturs	2013	
The Other Side of Everest: Climbing the North Face Through the Killer Storm	Matt Dickinson	1999	about North Face (Everest)
The Storms: Adventure and Tragedy on Everest	Mike Trueman	2015	about 1996 Mount Everest disaster
The Third Pole: My Everest Climb to Find the Truth About Mallory and Irvine	Mark Synnott	2021	about 1924 British Mount Everest expedition and 2019 ascent with Renan Öztürk
The Turquoise Mountain: Brian Blessed on Everest	Brian Blessed	1993	
To the Top of the World	Brian Blessed	1995	
Touching My Father's Soul: A Sherpa's Journey to the Top of Everest	Broughton Coburn and Jamling Tenzing Norgay	2001	about 1953 British Mount Everest expedition
Ultimate High: My Everest Odyssey	Göran Kropp	1997	about 1996 Mount Everest disaster
Up: My Life's Journey to the Top of Everest	Ben Fogle and Marina Fogle	2018	about 2018 season
Up and About, The Hard Road to Everest	Doug Scott	2015	
View from the Summit: The Remarkable Memoir by the First Person to Conquer Everest	Edmund Hillary	1999	about 1953 British Mount Everest expedition
Within Reach: My Everest Story	Mark Pfetzer	1998	about 1996 Mount Everest disaster
Many Everests: An Inspiring Journey of Transforming Dreams Into Reality	Ravindra Kumar	2016	

=== Fiction ===
- The Summit of the Gods (2000–2003 manga)
- Everest trilogy ("The Contest", "The Climb", and "The Summit"), Gordon Korman (2002)
- Peak, Roland Smith (2007)
- Paths of Glory, Jeffrey Archer (2009)
- The Abominable, Dan Simmons (2013)
- Dixon, Descending, Karen Outen (2024)

== Film and television ==
Title	Year	Genre	Notes
Tenzing	2026	Drama	Based on Tenzing Norgay and the first ascent of Everest.
The Sherpa Family Cleaning up Mount Everest	2022	Documentary	Directed by Geertjan Lassche
SHERPAS · True Heroes of Mount Everest	2009	Documentary	ARTE
14 Peaks: Nothing Is Impossible	2021	Documentary	
40 Days at Base Camp	2011	Documentary	about 2011 season
Bear's Mission Everest	2007	Documentary	with Bear Grylls
Beyond the Edge	2013	Documentary	about 1953 British Mount Everest expedition
Death Zone: Cleaning Mount Everest	2012	Documentary	about cleaning Everest directed by Marina Martins narrated by Patrick Stewart
Everest Air	2016	Reality TV show	
Everest	1998	Documentary	about 1996 Mount Everest disaster, a MacGillivray Freeman Films narrated by Liam Nelson for Imax
Everest '82	2007 mini-series	Documentary	about 1982 season
Everest: Beyond the Limit	2006–2009 TV series	Documentary	
Everest ER	2006	Documentary	BBC documentary about Everest ER
Everest: Kamigami no Itadaki (エヴェレスト 神々の山嶺 Everesuto Kamigami no Itadaki)	2016	Drama	
Everest: The Death Zone	1998	Documentary	Produce by NOVA, narrated by Jodie Foster
Extreme Everest	2018	Documentary	with Ant Middleton and Ed Wardle about 2018 season
Lost on Everest	2020	Documentary	Renan Öztürk
Galahad of Everest	1991	Documentary	with Brian Blessed
High Ground	2012	Documentary	about 2010 season
Keeper of the Mountains	2013	Documentary	about Elizabeth Hawley
Mount Everest	1952	Documentary	
The Epic of Everest	1924	Documentary	restored 2013, about 1924 British Mount Everest expedition
The Challenge: Everest	2018	Documentary	with Ben Fogle, Victoria Pendleton and Kenton Cool about 2018 season
The Conquest of Everest	1953	Documentary	
The Climb	2007	Documentary	about Laurie Skreslet ascent in 1982
The Man Who Skied Down Everest	1975	Documentary	about Yuichiro Miura in 1970
The Summit of the Gods	2021	Animation	
The Wildest Dream	2010	Documentary	about 1924 British Mount Everest expedition
Ultimate Survival: Everest	2004	Documentary	about 2004 season
Wings Over Everest	1934	Documentary	

=== Fiction/Dramatizations ===
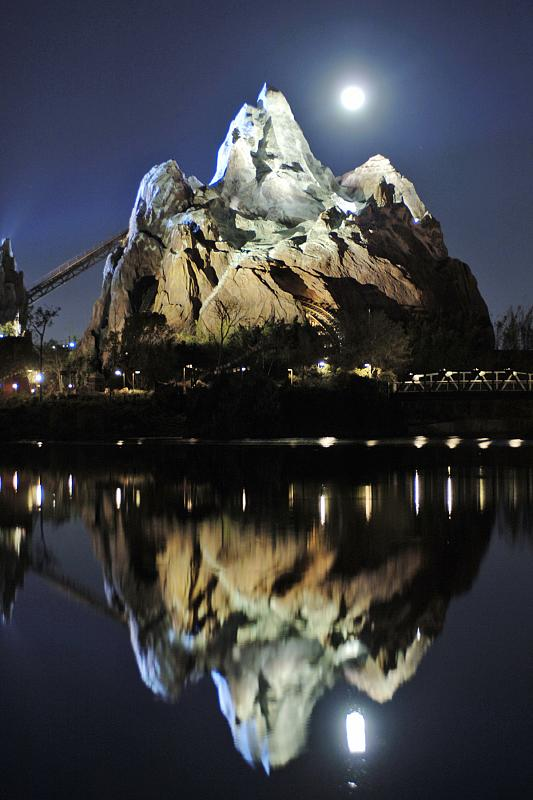
Expedition Everest, a roller coaster at Disney's Animal Kingdom

A filmer on the North Col in 1922

- Everest (2015)
- Into Thin Air: Death on Everest (1997 TV movie)
- Khangri: The Mountain (1996 Nepalese film)
- Lost on Everest (1998 TV episode)
- Mallory's Tragedy on Mount Everest (1954 TV episode)
- Miracle on Everest (2007)
- Our Everest Challenge (TV movie)
- Summit of Dreams (1998)
- Storm Over Everest (2008 TV episode)
- Monty Python's Flying Circus, "The All-England Summarize Proust Competition," the skit: "Everest Climbed by Hairdressers" (1972 TV episode)
- The Climb (2017)
- Touch the Top of the World (2006 TV movie)
- Wings Over Everest (2019)

== Other ==
- Expedition Everest, a roller coaster at Disney's Animal Kingdom theme park in Florida, and the most expensive roller coaster ever built at the time
- Mount Everest webcam, the world's highest live webcam, installed near the mountain in 2011
- Everest, a 2000 computer game
- Everest VR, a video game with virtual reality support based on the Unreal 4 game engine
- Mount Everest, a board game
