= After the Wind =

2014 non-fiction book by Lou Kasischke

After the Wind: 1996 Everest Tragedy—One Survivor's Story
- Hardcover edition
- Author: Lou Kasischke
- Illustrator: Jane Cardinal
- Language: English
- Subject: 1996 Mount Everest tragedy
- Genre: Non-fiction
- Publisher: Good Hart Publishing
- Publication date: 2014
- Publication place: United States
- Media type: Print
- Pages: 328 pp.
- ISBN: 978-1940877006
- OCLC: 946894362

After the Wind: 1996 Everest Tragedy—One Survivor’s Story is a book by Lou Kasischke that details his experiences as a client on Rob Hall’s expedition during the 1996 Mount Everest tragedy. The accident killed eight climbers—including four from the Hall expedition—and remained the worst climbing accident on Everest until the 2014 Mount Everest avalanche. The book features 55 illustrations by Jane Cardinal and was published in 2014 by Good Hart Publishing.

== Overview ==
Although he wrote the book in the aftermath of the tragedy, Kasischke waited 16 years to release After the Wind. The book focuses on the events leading up to the ascent, Kasischke’s experiences on the mountain, and his motivation for turning around 400 feet from the summit, as well as the close relationship he shares with his wife, Sandy.

Though Kasischke avoids blaming any single person for the tragedy, he does note that the presence of journalist Jon Krakauer may have caused guide Rob Hall, whose Adventure Consultants business was in competition with Scott Fischer’s Mountain Madness, to take uncharacteristic risks on the mountain in an effort to get as many clients as possible to the summit and subsequently receive favorable press from Krakauer's report.

== Reception ==
After the Wind received favorable reviews from critics. Kirkus Reviews gave the book a starred review, describing it as "a vivid, intimate memoir that, with great clarity and attention to detail, tells an unforgettable survival story." Blue Ink Reviews labelled the book a "thoughtful, well-written love story" and "an edge-of-your-seat description of navigating and mountaineering Everest," and awarded the book a starred review. It was also nominated for the 2014 Kirkus Prize for non-fiction and was a finalist for Eric Hoffer Grand Prize and First Horizon Book Awards.

A reviewer of Publishers Weekly commented "His narrative is stark and accessible, bringing the mountaineer's journey to life in accessible language, though the internal monologue veers toward self-indulgent reflection and recriminations ... Regardless of why the tragedy occurred, Kasischke’s account provides an eye-opening look at the perils and extreme conditions on Everest. Evocative illustrations by Jane Cardinal further enhance the text, and include maps and timelines".

== Awards ==
- Gold Medal: Benjamin Franklin Book Award, Best New Voice in Nonfiction
- Bronze Medal: Foreword Reviews' Book of the Year Award: Adventure
- Winner: New York Book Festival, Memoir
- Winner: National Indie Excellence Book Award, Adventure and Memoir
- 1st Runner-Up: The Eric Hoffer Book Award for Independent Books, Memoir
- Winner: Shelf Unbound Best Independently Published Book
- Bronze Medal: Independent Publishers Association Book Award, Sports

== See also ==
=== Books and films ===
- Into Thin Air, a 1997 book by Jon Krakauer.
- The Climb, a 1997 book by Anatoli Boukreev.
- Into Thin Air: Death on Everest, a 1997 TV movie.
- Everest, a 2015 film.

=== Lists ===
- List of media related to Mount Everest
- List of people who died climbing Mount Everest
