= Sandy Hill (mountaineer) =

American socialite, mountaineer, author, and fashion editor

- Born: Sandra Hill; April 12, 1955 (age 71); Los Gatos, California, U.S.
- Other name: Sandy Hill Pittman
- Occupations: Fashion editor; mountaineer; author
- Known for: 1996 Everest disaster, second American woman to ascend the Seven Summits
- Spouses: Jerry Solomon (m. 1977; div. 1978) Robert Pittman (m. 1979; div. 1997) Thomas Dittmer (m. 2001; div. 2011)
- Children: 1

Sandra Hill (born April 12, 1955, formerly Sandra Hill Pittman) is a mountaineer, author, former fashion editor, and socialite. She survived the 1996 Mount Everest disaster shortly after becoming the 34th woman to reach the Mount Everest summit and the second American woman to climb the Seven Summits.

== Personal life ==
Sandy Hill grew up in Los Gatos, California. Her father ran a successful business that rented portable toilets to construction sites. She graduated from UCLA before moving to New York for her first job, working as a buyer for the now defunct Bonwit Teller. After meeting an editor at Mademoiselle, she landed her second job as Merchandising Editor of the magazine, and, a few years later, she became Beauty Editor of Brides magazine. Hill then served until 1986 as president of a division of RJR Nabisco called "In Fashion" where she produced television shows about fashion and style. One of those shows was Fashion America, which was the first TV program to feature fashion commentary, videos and runway footage. Hill has also been a contributing editor to Vogue and Condé Nast Traveler, and written feature articles for other publications.

Hill was briefly married to Jerry Solomon, who worked in the sport business and was a graduate student of Columbia at the time; the couple were divorced by the time she was 23. Solomon later went on to marry figure skater Nancy Kerrigan. In July 1979, Hill married MTV co-founder and media executive Robert Pittman; who was a radio disc jockey and the Program Director of WNBC in New York when they met. They have one son, Robert T. "Bo" Pittman. The couple divorced in 1997, and Hill received a settlement of $20 million from Pittman. Hill met snowboarder Stephen Koch while climbing Mount Everest in April 1996, and they lived together in New York until 1997.

In 1998, Hill attended the Columbia Graduate School of Architecture, Planning and Preservation in New York to study architectural preservation and restoration. She graduated in 2000.

Hill married commodities trader Thomas Dittmer in April 2001, and they purchased a ranch and vineyard in the Santa Ynez Valley. Hill filed for divorce in 2008, and attempted unsuccessfully to legally invalidate the couple's prenuptial agreement.

== Mountaineering ==
Hill began mountaineering as a teenager; her first summit at age 13 was Disappointment Peak in the Teton Range. In 1992 she began a quest to become the first American woman to scale the Seven Summits, the highest peaks on each continent. She summited Aconcagua (1992), Denali (1992), Vinson Massif (1993), Mount Elbrus (1993), Mount Kilimanjaro (1993), Mount Kosciuszko (1994), and Puncak Jaya (1995). Hill finally reached the Mount Everest summit in 1996, thus becoming the second American woman to scale the Seven Summits, following Mary "Dolly" Lefever.

Hill had attempted to summit Everest twice before her successful bid in 1996. In 1993, she reached 23,500 feet (7,200 m) on a guided expedition following the traditional South Col route. On this expedition, she wore a cross necklace custom-made by jeweler Barry Kieselstein-Cord to bury on the summit, but this ceremony did not take place. In 1994 she raised corporate sponsorship with $250,000 from Chesebrough-Ponds for an attempt climbing the difficult Kangshung Face, with her film production partner at the time, filmmaker David Breashears, and climbers Alex Lowe, Barry Blanchard and Steve Swenson but the expedition was turned back by avalanche danger above 25,000 feet.

=== 1996 Everest disaster ===
Hill, known as Sandy Pittman at the time, survived the 1996 Mount Everest disaster. As part of the Mountain Madness expedition headed by Scott Fischer, during what was her third attempt to climb Mount Everest, she was in agreement with NBC Interactive Media to stream journalistic dispatches from Base Camp to schoolchildren in the United States. The technology required to transmit this blog included a laptop computer and a 20-pound satellite phone. The phone was carried as high as Camp IV by Sherpas, but it did not work there. Online, the website was referred to as The "NBC Everest Assault.” Due to her assertive personality, fellow Everest climber Lene Gammelgaard thought of her as "Pit Bull" rather as Pittman.

On May 10, 1996, at roughly 2:30 pm, Hill summited with others on the peak before descending the Hillary Step. Hill had reportedly been short-roped up the mountain by Lopsang Jangbu Sherpa for five to six hours at the outset of the ascent. Pittman would later contest this claim after surviving the disaster, stating she was short-roped by Lopsang for only 45 minutes. Facing backlash following the massive success of Jon Krakauer's Into Thin Air, Pittman further insisted that the connecting line between her and Lopsang was a loose belay rather than a short-rope.

Eighteen hours later, Mountain Madness guide Neal Beidleman descended the Hillary Step with Hill and her teammates, including Tim Madsen and Charlotte Fox, to find camp. Descending, “Sandy got her crampons tangled in the ropes,” Beidleman recalls. Stopping to check on others, Beidleman noticed Fox giving Hill a shot of dexamethasone that she asked for. Beidleman asked teammate Lene Gammelgaard to trade oxygen tanks with Hill, as Gammelgaard's tank had more oxygen left and unlike Hill, she could walk on her own. On the way to a saddle called the South Col, Hill and others slid down the fixed lines. At the bottom, the group joined Mike Groom, a guide from Adventure Consultants, and his client Yasuko Namba, who was brought down the lines by Beidleman, and Beck Weathers, who had not summited due to poor eyesight, but had been waiting for Rob Hall, an Adventure Consultants guide, to return, along with Klev Schoening from Mountain Madness and two sherpa.

Groom tethered himself to Weathers after Hall did not return from higher up the mountain. Not knowing which direction to go due to the storm, they huddled in the snow. Around midnight, stars came out as the storm subsided, prompting Beidleman, Schoening, Gammelgaard, and Groom to make it to camp and find help, leaving Namba and Weathers, who were unconscious, and Fox and Hill, who were too exhausted to continue with Madsen. Upon reaching Camp IV, the group alerted Anatoli Boukreev, a guide for Hill's team, Mountain Madness, on the location of the rest of the climbers. Reaching the group, Boukreev brought Hill tea, left her with Madsen, and assisted Fox to the camp before returning to Madsen, who walked while Boukreev carried Hill to Camp IV. After returning, Boukreev collapsed with exhaustion, leaving unconscious climbers Namba and Weathers in the snow. Weathers unexpectedly awoke from his unconscious state and despite frostbite, climbed to Camp IV alone. On May 12, Camp IV was evacuated for Camp III, where three days earlier, Chen Yu-Nan, an expedition member of a Taiwanese group led by Malaku Gau Ming-Ho, had fallen off the Lhotse Face from strong winds without crampons or a tie-in. Descending between Camp III and Camp II, a sherpa was hit by a falling rock. While descending to Camp III, Hill asked Fox to give her another dexamethasone shot. On May 13, they reached base camp. The morning of May 14, they hiked to Pheriche, the town below base camp, where Hill, Fox and Madsen departed in a chartered helicopter to Kathmandu.

Eight people died that night, seven from other expeditions, and the disaster was covered in numerous magazine articles and interviews with other survivors. Jon Krakauer, who was sent to climb with another expedition and report on the commercialization of Everest and increasing number of rich clients without expertise, later expanded his September 1996 Outside Magazine article into a book with the same title, Into Thin Air (1997). However, Hill and the others all had previous climbing experience. Hill rebutted negative claims in various media outlets, including an interview with Newsweek, wherein she stated, "We behaved like a team at all times." Highly visible in the media before the climb, she believed she was "pigeonholed as a rich New Yorker", which "painted such an easy picture of a villain right there."

In a 2006 interview with Outside, Hill defended Boukreev's decisions on Everest and attacked the media and various authors and journalists who covered the disaster, saying that "most of what was reported in 1996 was prejudiced, sensationalist, and overblown—thrilling fiction at best—but not journalism."

Boukreev was given an award for heroism by the American Alpine Club, and he recounted his story in the book, The Climb: Tragic Ambitions on Everest (1997), which was at least partly a response to Krakauer's account, in which Krakauer had laid some of the blame for the disaster on Boukreev, Hill, and a few others.

In the August 1997 issue of Vogue, Hill wrote about the whole experience, and went into detail about her long history as a climber and her passion for mountain climbing that developed when she was young. She talked about the difficulties she experienced during her climbs of the Seven Summits and about the real dangers she experienced during her final climb of Everest.

In the TV movie Into Thin Air: Death on Everest (1997), based on Krakauer's book, Pamela Gien portrays Sandy Hill.

David Breashears interviewed Hill in the documentary film Storm Over Everest (2008), which was aired on PBS Frontline on May 13, 2008.

In the 2015 feature film Everest, Hill is portrayed by Vanessa Kirby.

== Books ==
Hill is the main author of the book Fandango: Recipes, Parties, and License to Make Magic (2007), which talks about Sandy Hill's lifestyle and includes various recipes co-authored by Stephanie Valentine and advice on how to decorate and host, using 18 parties that Hill designed and hosted as examples.

Hill's second book, Mountain: Portraits of High Places (2011), is a compilation of photographs and art with rarely seen images from prominent nature photographers, including Galen Rowell, Peter Beard, Ansel Adams, and Frank Smythe.

== See also ==
- Timeline of the 1996 Mount Everest disaster
