= The Climb (book) =

1997 novel by Anatoli Boukreev and G. Western DeWalt

- Author: Anatoli Boukreev; G. Weston DeWalt
- Language: English
- Subject: 1996 Everest Disaster
- Genre: Non-fiction
- Publisher: St. Martin's Press
- Publication date: 28 June 1997
- Publication place: United Kingdom
- Media type: Print
- Pages: 255
- ISBN: 0312168144
- OCLC: 37361646

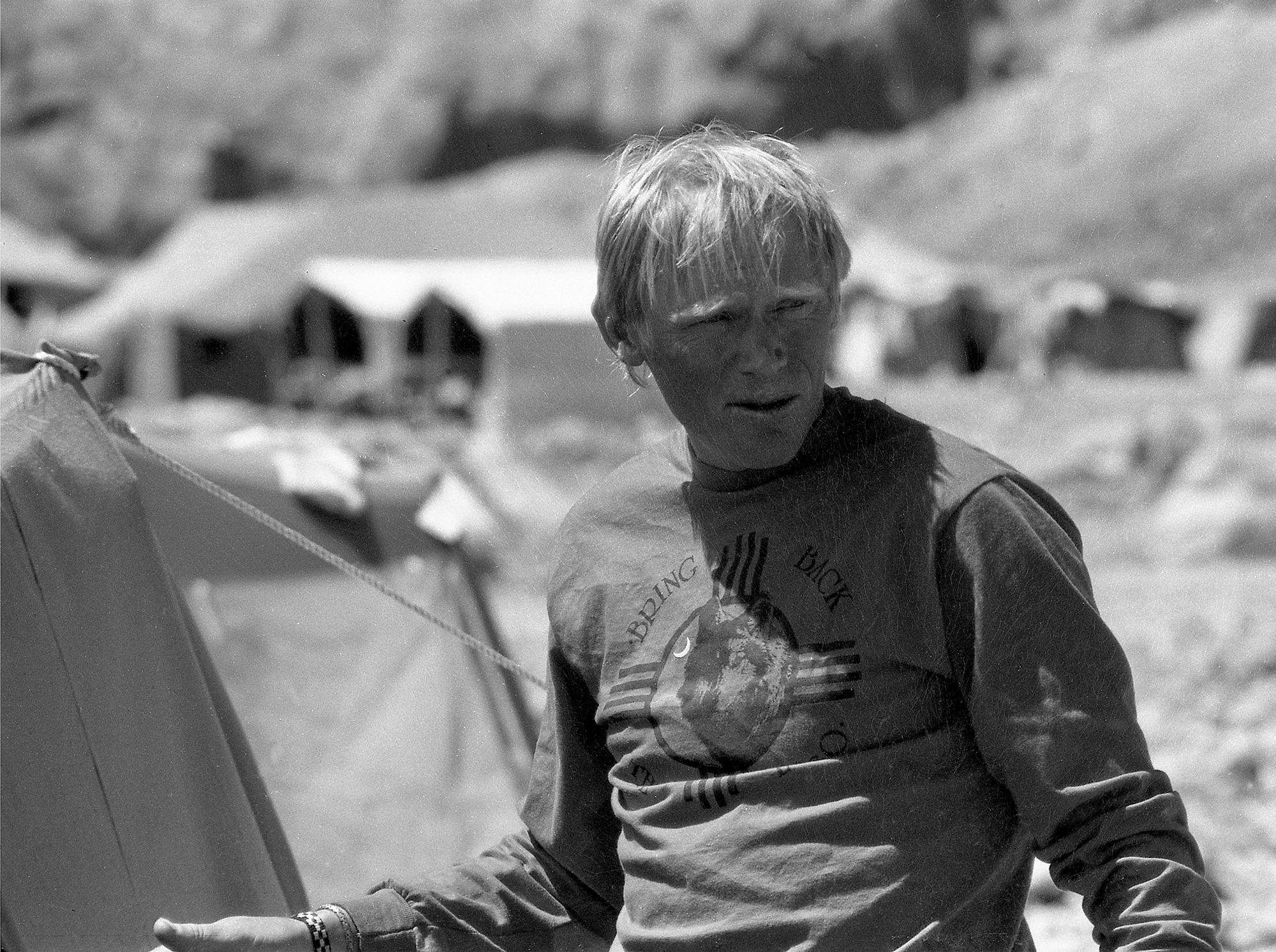
Anatoli Boukreev

The Climb (1997), republished as The Climb: Tragic Ambitions on Everest, is an account by Russian-Kazakhstani mountaineer Anatoli Boukreev of the 1996 Everest Disaster, during which eight climbers died on the mountain. The co-author, G. Weston DeWalt—who was not part of the expedition—provides accounts from other climbers and ties together the narrative of Boukreev's logbook.

== Background ==
The book is partially a response to Jon Krakauer's account of the same 1996 Everest climb in his book Into Thin Air (1997), which criticized some of Boukreev's actions during the climb.

After The Climb was published, DeWalt leveled many public criticisms at Krakauer concerning the accuracy of his account of what happened on the mountain during the 1996 climb. Krakauer refuted the allegations and provided additional details in the postscript to the 1999 edition of Into Thin Air.

Boukreev was killed in 1997 in an avalanche with Dimitri Sobolev during a winter ascent of Annapurna in Nepal.

== Book reviews ==
A reviewer of Publishers Weekly commented "Like Into Thin Air, Jon Krakauer's bestselling chronicle of the same expedition, this account is a gripping account of the Mountain Madness group's bid to reach the top of the world's highest peak, one that combines Boukreev's firsthand recollections and DeWalt's interviews with team members. But Boukreev and DeWalt, a freelance journalist, also offer a look at the mundane tasks associated with climbing, such as obtaining the necessary permits and equipment, and taking the reader through the complex preparations required to scale the mountain, including the establishment of various camps and the acclimatization process required for climbers to adjust to higher altitudes".

A reviewer of Kirkus Reviews stated "Mountain guide Boukreev tells his version of the events of the May 1996 Mt. Everest disaster, in which five climbers died, in an effort to clear his name of damning allegations made in Jon Krakauer's bestselling Into Thin Air. Boukreev is well known in climbing circles as a good, tough, experienced guide, not especially personable or given to pampering the clients, but utterly reliable, especially in tight situations".

== Criticism ==
Controversies about the 1996 Everest disaster abound and The Climb has received its share of criticism. Neal Beidleman, one of the three surviving guides of the expedition, stated, “I think that The Climb is a dishonest account of the May tragedy… [N]either you nor your associates once called to fact-check a single detail with me.” Another one of the three guides who survived the climb, Michael Groom, was also not interviewed by the authors of The Climb.

Publicist Jane Bromet states in a letter to DeWalt and his publisher that the edited version of her quote that appears in The Climb is “absolutely wrong!” Bromet wrote, “The distortion will mislead readers into a false conclusion concerning many of the most important factors that led to the accident.“

Boukreev and De Walt defended their book by responding at length to Krakauer and other critics. The controversies about the disaster and the books written about it continued for almost thirty years. In 2025 Jon Krakauer was still defending his book, Into Thin Air, on YouTube.

== See also ==
- Timeline of the 1996 Mount Everest disaster

=== Books and films about the 1996 Everest Disaster ===
- After the Wind (2014), a book by Lou Kasischke.
- Left for Dead: My Journey Home from Everest (2000), a book by Beck Weathers
- Into Thin Air: Death on Everest (1997), a TV movie.
- Everest (1998), an IMAX documentary film.
- Everest (2015), a feature film.
- Into Thin Air, a book by Jon Krakauer

=== Other similar movies ===
- Vertical Limit

=== Lists ===
- List of media related to Mount Everest
- List of people who died climbing Mount Everest
