= Beck Weathers =

American pathologist & writer (born 1946)

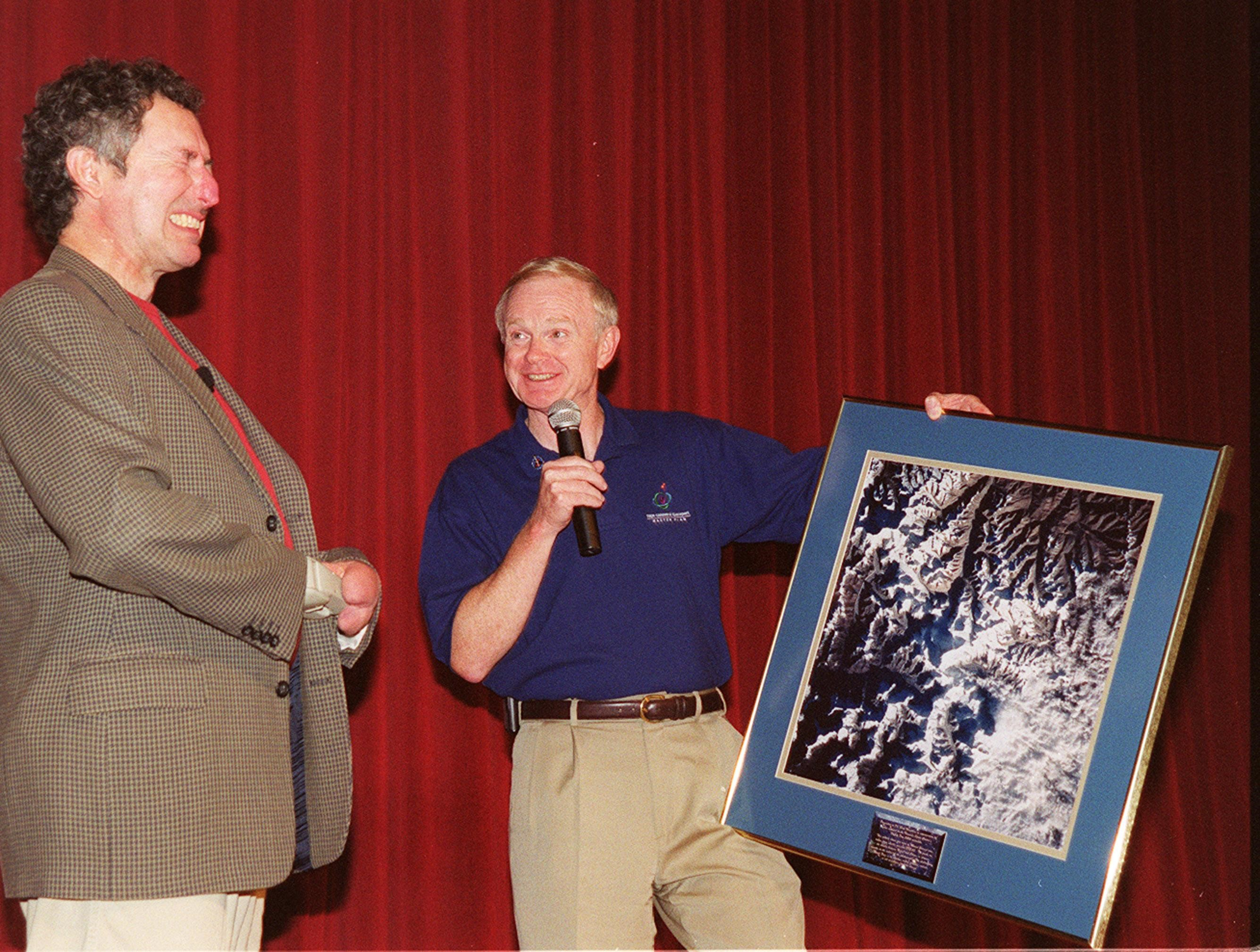
- Beck Weathers (left) in 2000
- Born: Seaborn Beck Weathers; December 16, 1946 (age 79); Dallas, Texas, U.S.
- Occupations: Pathologist, amateur mountaineer
- Known for: Surviving the 1996 Mount Everest disaster

Seaborn Beck Weathers (born December 16, 1946) is an American pathologist from Texas who survived the 1996 Mount Everest disaster. His story was covered in Jon Krakauer's book Into Thin Air (1997), its film adaptation Into Thin Air: Death on Everest (1997), and the films Everest (1998) and Everest (2015). His autobiographical book, titled Left for Dead: My Journey Home from Everest (2000) includes his ordeal, but also describes his life before and afterward, as he focused on saving his damaged relationships.

== Early life and personal life ==
Weathers was born in a military family. He attended college in Wichita Falls, Texas, married, and had two children. In 1986, he enrolled in a mountaineering course and later decided to try to climb the Seven Summits. He considered Richard Bass, the first man to climb the Seven Summits, an "inspiration" who made summitting Everest seem possible for "regular guys". In 1993, he was making a guided ascent on Vinson Massif, where he encountered Sandy Pittman, whom he would later meet on Everest in 1996.

Weathers said in an interview that he "had spent most of my adult life in profound depression," and turned to mountaineering and physical activity to reduce its effects. "I never let anybody know about it," he said of his depression, "and I discovered that if you drove your body hard — when you did that, you couldn't think, and that lack of thinking as you punished your body and drove yourself was amazingly pleasant."

== Mount Everest ==
In May 1996, Weathers was one of eight clients being guided on Mount Everest by Rob Hall of Adventure Consultants. Weathers, who had recently had radial keratotomy surgery, soon discovered that he was blinded by the effects of high altitude. On May 10, the day of the summit assault, Hall, after being told Weathers could not see, wanted him to descend to Camp IV immediately. Weathers, however, believed his vision might improve when the sun came out, so Hall had advised him to wait on the Balcony (27,000 ft, on the 29,000 ft Everest) until Hall came back down to descend with him.

Hall, while assisting another client to reach the summit, did not return, and later died farther up on the mountain. Weathers eventually began descending with guide Michael Groom, who was short-roping him. When the blizzard struck, Weathers and 10 other climbers became disoriented in the storm, and could not find Camp IV. By the time there was a break in the storm several hours later, Weathers had been so weakened that he and four others were left there so the others could summon help. Anatoli Boukreev, a guide on another expedition led by Scott Fischer, came and rescued several climbers, but during that time, Weathers had stood up and disappeared into the night. The next day, another client on Hall's team, Stuart Hutchison, and two Sherpas arrived to check on the status of Weathers and fellow client Yasuko Namba. Both climbers were found to be alive, but in an extreme state of stupor. Believing the climbers to be near death and unable make it off the mountain alive, Hutchison and the others left them and returned to Camp IV.

Defying expectations, Weathers emerged from his hypothermic coma. When he awoke, he managed to walk down to Camp IV under his own power. His fellow climbers said that his frozen hand and nose looked and felt as if they were made of porcelain, and they did not expect him to survive. His nose appeared like a piece of charcoal and his cheeks were black. His hands were so frozen that one of the surgeons who later operated on them described them as "the hands of a dead man."

With that assumption, they only tried to make him comfortable until he died, but he survived another freezing night alone in a tent, unable to eat, drink, or keep himself covered with the sleeping bags with which he was provided. His cries for help could not be heard above the blizzard, and his companions were surprised to find him alive and coherent the following day.

Weathers was later helped to walk, on frozen feet, to a lower camp, where he was a subject of the highest-altitude medical evacuation ever performed by helicopter up until that time. Following his helicopter evacuation from the Western Cwm, his right arm was amputated halfway between the elbow and wrist. All four fingers and his thumb on his left hand were also amputated, as well as parts of both feet. His nose was amputated and reconstructed with tissue from his ear and forehead.

== After Everest ==
Weathers published his book about his Everest experience and his life, Left for Dead: My Journey Home from Everest (2000), and continues to practice medicine and deliver motivational speeches. He lives in Dallas, Texas, and was on the pathology staff at Medical City Dallas Hospital.

== In media ==
Richard Jenkins portrayed Weathers in the 1997 television film Into Thin Air: Death on Everest. Josh Brolin later did so in the 2015 film Everest. Weathers is a character in the opera Everest by Joby Talbot; at the world premiere the role was created by bass Kevin Burdette.

== See also ==
- Timeline of the 1996 Mount Everest disaster
