= Salvatore Totino =

American cinematographer

- Born: November 2, 1964 (age 61); Brooklyn, New York, U.S.
- Occupation: Cinematographer

Salvatore Totino, ASC, AIC (born November 2, 1964) is an American cinematographer, known for his collaborations with director Ron Howard. He was invited to join AMPAS in 2006, and has been a member of the American Society of Cinematographers (ASC) since 2007 and the Italian Society of Cinematographers since 2011. In additional to feature films, he has shot numerous music videos and television commercials.

== Filmography ==
Music videos

Year	Title	Artist	Director
1993	"Why Must We Wait Until Tonight"	Tina Turner	Peter Care
1994	"Spoonman"	Soundgarden	Jeff Plansker
1994	"Lightning Crashes"	Live	Peter Care
1994	"What's the Frequency, Kenneth?"	R.E.M.	Peter Care
1995	"It's Good to Be King"	Tom Petty	Jake Scott
1995	"Queer"	Garbage	Stéphane Sednaoui
1995	"Secret Garden"	Bruce Springsteen	Peter Care
1996	"Burden in My Hand"	Soundgarden	Peter Care
1996	"Mother Mother"	Tracy Bonham	Peter Care
1997	"Staring at the Sun"	U2	Jake Scott
1998	"Fake Plastic Trees"	Radiohead	Jake Scott
1998	"Industrial is Dead"	Fine ft. Ashley Hamilton	Jordan Scott

Key
†	Denotes films that have not yet been released

Feature films

Year	Title	Director	Notes
1999	Any Given Sunday	Oliver Stone	
2002	Changing Lanes	Roger Michell	
2003	The Missing	Ron Howard	1st collaboration with Howard
2005	Cinderella Man	Ron Howard	
2006	The Da Vinci Code	Ron Howard	
2008	Frost/Nixon	Ron Howard	
2009	Angels & Demons	Ron Howard	
2011	The Dilemma	Ron Howard	
2012	People Like Us	Alex Kurtzman	
2015	Everest	Baltasar Kormákur	
2015	Concussion	Peter Landesman	
2016	Inferno	Ron Howard	
2017	Spider-Man: Homecoming	Jon Watts	
2018	Bird Box	Susanne Bier	
2020	The Tax Collector	David Ayer	
2021	Space Jam: A New Legacy	Malcolm D. Lee	
2023	65	Scott Beck; Bryan Woods	
2023	Ghosted	Dexter Fletcher	
2024	Unstoppable	William Goldenberg	
2027	Alone at Dawn †	Ron Howard	Post-production

Television

Year	Title	Director	Notes
2022	The Offer	Dexter Fletcher; Adam Arkin; Colin Bucksey	6 episodes

== Awards and nominations ==
- Everest (2015)
  - Camerimage Jury Award for Best 3D Film (Nominated)
