= Anatoli Boukreev =

Kazakh mountain climber and author (1958–1997)

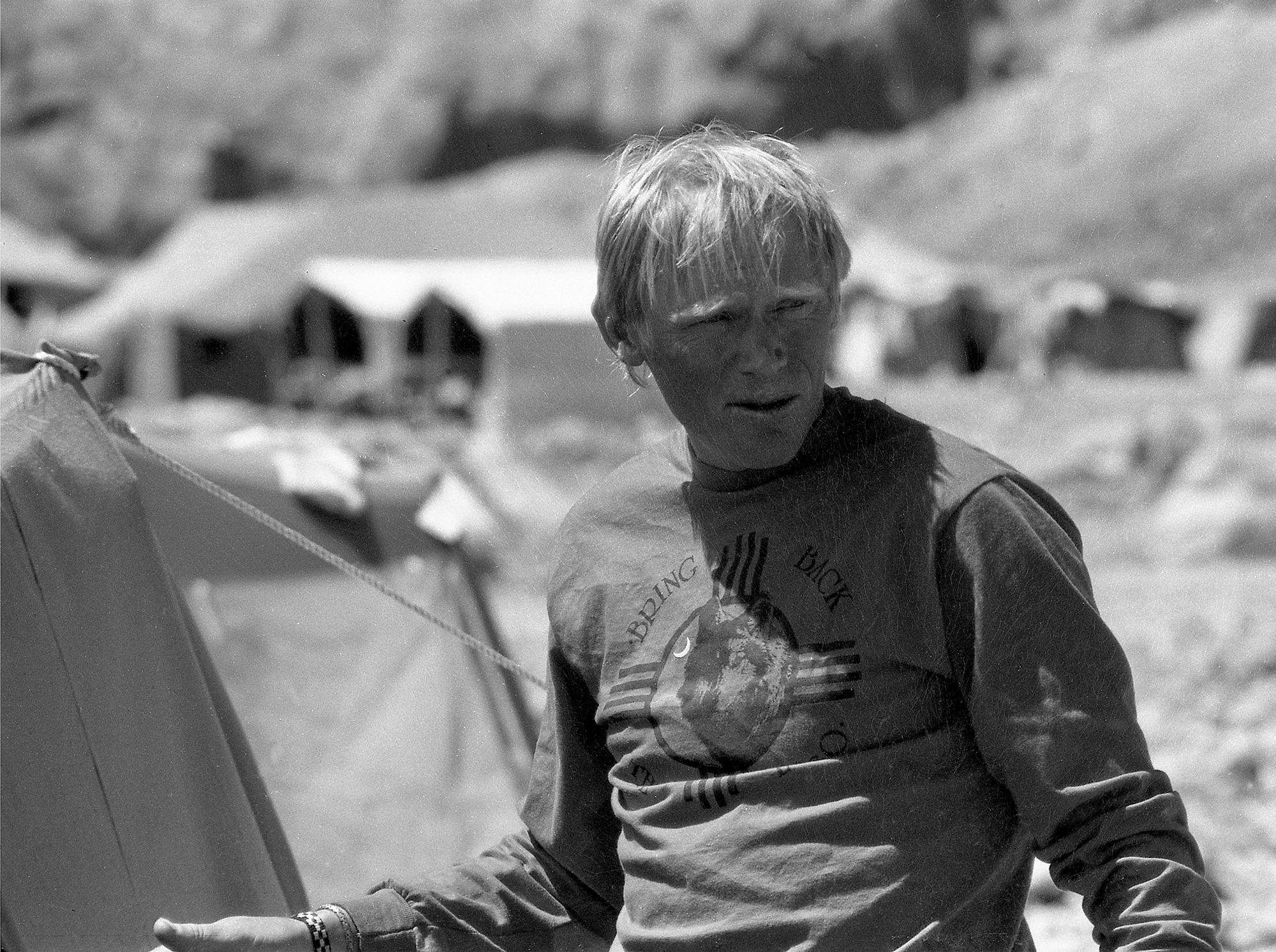
- Boukreev in 1991
- Born: Anatoli Nikolaevich Boukreev; January 16, 1958; Korkino, Russian SFSR, Soviet Union
- Died: December 25, 1997 (aged 39); Annapurna I, Nepal
- Cause of death: Avalanche
- Citizenship: Kazakhstan
- Education: Chelyabinsk State Pedagogical University (B.S.)
- Occupation: Mountaineer
- Known for: 18 ascents of 8000m peaks, 1996 Mount Everest disaster rescues
- Awards: USSR Order For Personal Courage; USSR Order For Merit To The Fatherland; David A. Sowles Memorial Award

Anatoli Nikolaevich Boukreev (Russian: Анато́лий Никола́евич Букре́ев; January 16, 1958 – December 25, 1997) was a Russian-born Kazakh mountaineer who made ascents of 10 of the 14 eight-thousander peaks—those above 8,000 m (26,247 ft)—without supplemental oxygen. From 1989 through 1997, he made 18 successful ascents of peaks above 8,000 m.

Boukreev had a reputation as an elite mountaineer in international climbing circles for summiting K2 in 1993 and Mount Everest via the North Ridge route in 1995, and for his solo speed ascents of some of the world's highest mountains. He became even more widely known for saving the lives of three climbers during the 1996 Mount Everest disaster, although his actions during that event were tinged with controversy. He was the co-author of The Climb: Tragic Ambitions on Everest about the 1996 disaster.

In 1997, Boukreev was killed in an avalanche during a winter ascent of Annapurna in Nepal. Boukreev's companion, Linda Wylie, edited his memoirs and published them in 2002 under the title Above the Clouds: The Diaries of a High-Altitude Mountaineer.

== Biography ==
Boukreev was born in Korkino, a poor, coal-mining town within the Soviet Union's Russian SFSR. He came from the narod, the common people, and his parents were both poor. He began climbing in the Ural Mountains when he was twelve years old. When he was sixteen, he was selected by the Soviet government for high-altitude training in the Tian Shan. After completing high school in 1975, he attended Chelyabinsk University for Pedagogy, where he majored in physics and earned his Bachelor of Science degree in 1979. At the same time, he also completed a coaching program for cross-country skiing.

After graduation, the 21-year-old dreamed of mountain climbing. Boukreev moved to Alma-Ata, the capital of the neighbouring Kazakh SSR (present-day Kazakhstan) located in the Tian Shan mountain range. He became a member of the National Climbing Team of the Soviet Union and scaled many summits during the 1980s. As a member of the National Climbing Team, he received a salary, prestige, and support for his climbing. In 1989, he climbed Kanchenjunga, his first summit of an 8,000 m (26,000 ft) peak. In 1991, he made his first summit of Everest.

The breakup of the Soviet Union in 1991 left Boukreev without a livelihood and even finding enough to eat became a challenge. He became a citizen of Kazakhstan in 1991 and embarked on a nomadic career as a mountaineering guide in Asia and the United States, sometimes relying on common labor to earn a living. Despite his straitened economic condition, he accumulated an impressive number of mountaineering feats, including speed records for climbing several mountains.

Boukreev worked as the head guide for Scott Fischer's newly-formed company Mountain Madness during the 1996 Mount Everest disaster. He survived and, during a blizzard, was instrumental in saving the lives of Charlotte Fox, Tim Madsen, and New York socialite Sandy Hill Pittman.

== Climbing accomplishments ==
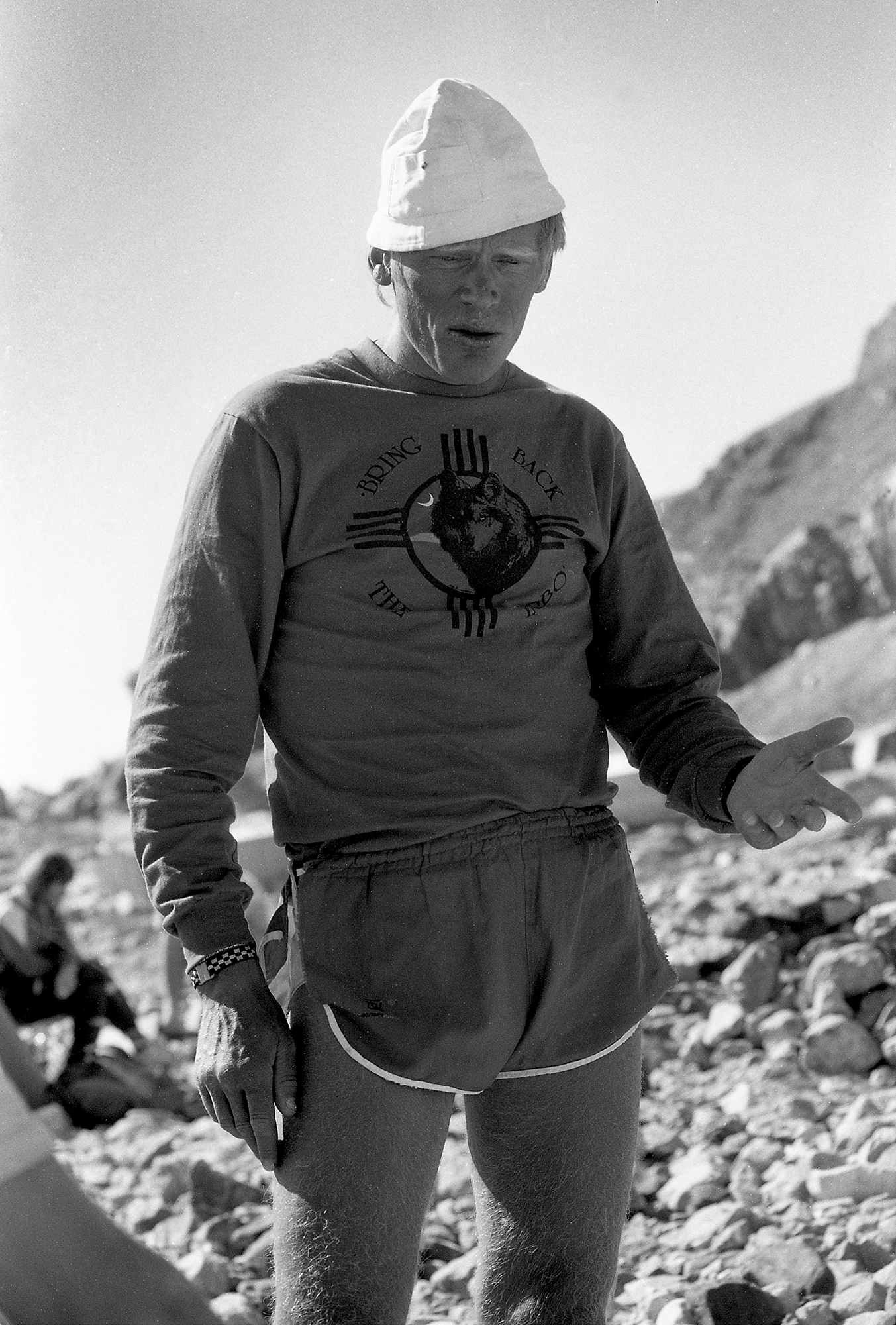
Boukreev in 1991 Photo by: Jaan Kynnap

=== Highlights ===
Year	Date	Mountain	Height	Route/Details	Notes
1987		Lenin Peak	7,134 m		First solo ascent
1989	April 15	Kangchenjunga	8,586 m	New route	With Second Soviet Himalaya Expedition
1989	April 30 - May 2	Kangchenjunga			First traverse of the four 8,000 m summits of the massif
1990	April	Denali	6,193 m	Cassin Ridge route	
1990	May	Denali	6,193 m	West Rib route	Solo ascent
1991	May 10	Dhaulagiri	8,176 m	New route on the west wall	With First Kazakhstan Himalaya Expedition
1991	October 7	Mount Everest	8,848 m	South Col route	
1993	May 14	Denali	6,193 m		
1993	July 30	K2	8,611 m	Abruzzi route	
1994	April 29	Makalu II	8,460 m		
1994	May 15	Makalu	8,476 m		With Neal Beidleman; planned fastest speed ascent abandoned due to destroyed tent at camp III
1995	May 17	Mount Everest	8,848 m	North Ridge route	
1995	June 30	Peak Abai	4,010 m		Guide for President of Kazakhstan
1995	October 8	Dhaulagiri	8,176 m		Fastest ascent record (17h 15m)
1995	December 8	Manaslu	8,156 m		With Second Kazakhstan Himalaya Expedition
1996	May 10	Mount Everest	8,848 m	South Col route	Guide for Mountain Madness
1996	May 17	Lhotse	8,516 m		Solo ascent, speed record (21h 16min) from Base Camp without supplemental oxygen
1996	September 25	Cho Oyu	8,201 m		With Third Kazakhstan Himalaya Expedition
1996	October 9	Shishapangma (North summit)	8,008 m		
1997	April 24	Mount Everest	8,848 m	South Col Route	Guide for Indonesian military expedition
1997	May 23	Lhotse	8,516 m		
1997	July 7	Broad Peak	8,047 m		Solo ascent
1997	July 14	Gasherbrum II	8,035 m		Solo ascent. Advanced Base Camp (5800 metres) to summit in 9hr 30min.

=== Denali ===
In May 1990, Boukreev was invited by an American climber to guide several clients to the summit of Denali in Alaska. Denali, also known as Mount McKinley, has challenges such as hidden crevasses and unpredictably cold weather due to its proximity to the Arctic Circle and the ocean.

The expedition was a success, and the team reached the summit and returned without incident. During the climb, there had been somewhat of a language barrier, and Boukreev felt the sting of needing to borrow equipment due to his economic circumstances. After the team had returned home, Boukreev decided to attempt a solo speed ascent of Denali before returning to the Soviet Union.

Boukreev's solo speed ascent of Denali in 1990 was completed in 10½ hours from the base to the summit. That season acclimatized climbers were normally taking three to four days and five camps to summit — Boukreev's feat was noted by Climbing magazine in a 1990 issue, and commented on by Denali Park rangers who described it as "unreal".

=== K2 ===
In 1993, Boukreev reached the summit of K2 via the Abruzzi Spur, where he shared the peak with team members Peter Metzger from Germany and Andrew Lock from Australia. The other team members were German climbers Reinmar Joswig (the team leader) and Ernst Eberhardt. With a peak elevation of 8,611 metres (28,251 ft), K2 is the second-highest mountain on Earth after Mount Everest.

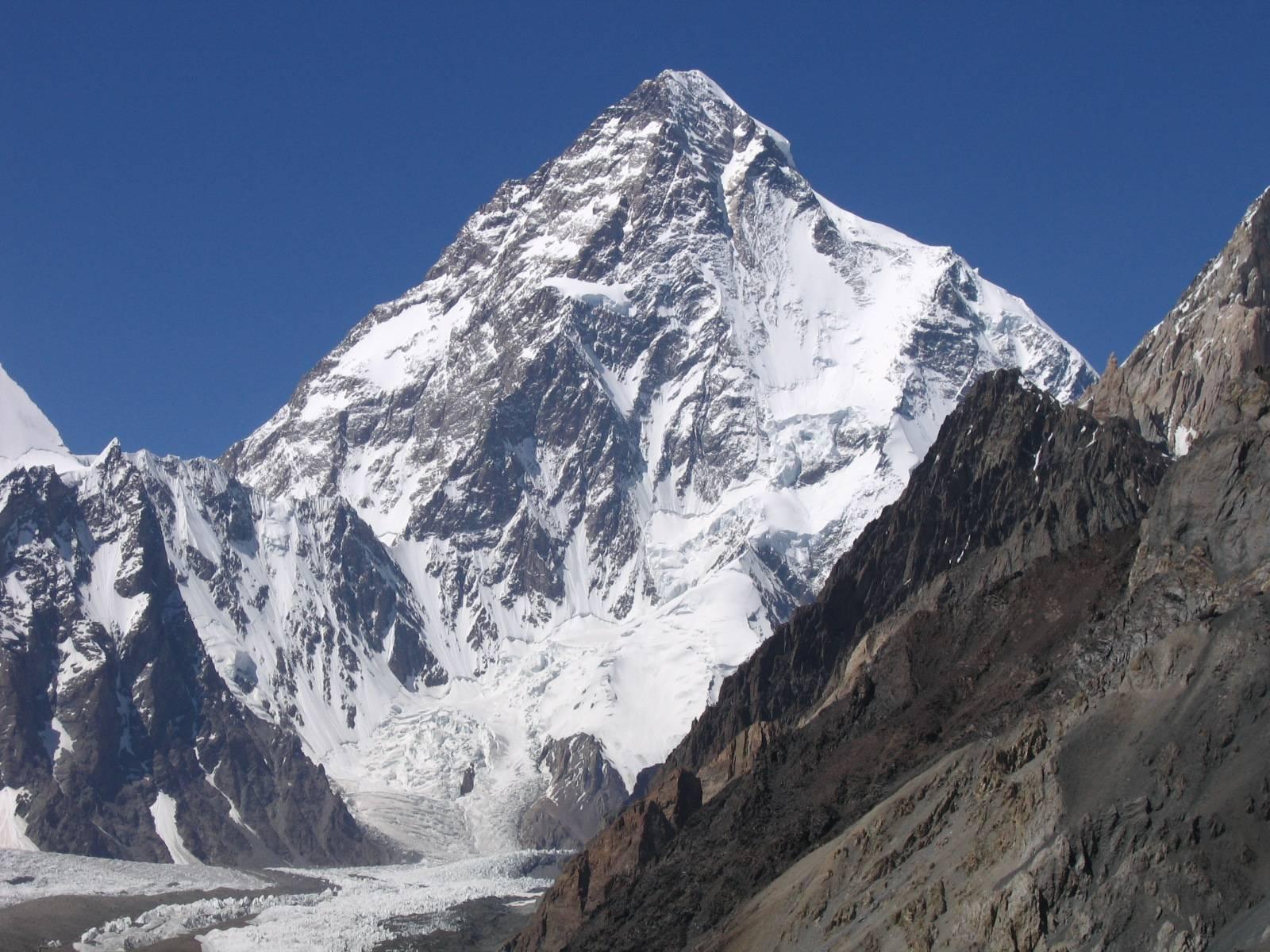
K2

As part of the Karakoram range, K2 is located on the border between Pakistan and China. K2 is referred to as the "Savage Mountain" — notable for its steep pyramidal relief, dropping quickly in almost all directions, and the inherent danger in climbing it. The danger facing Boukreev on K2 was that the summit felt like the finish line. Boukreev would later write that he did not feel the emotions of victory in that moment on top of K2's peak because he was physically and emotionally spent. Boukreev found himself in a dangerous position. He had expended too much energy placing fixed lines along a narrow, steep portion earlier that day. But since the team wanted to push on to the summit that same afternoon, rather than return to their tents to sleep and make a summit bid the next morning, Boukreev acquiesced. Boukreev would later write:

During my years of training as a ski racer, and then as a mountaineer, I had learned how to wring out the last of my energy for a finish. But this is dangerous in mountaineering, because the summit is not the finish of your competition with a great mountain. To survive you must be able to get down from the forbidden zone.

Boukreev later described feeling like a "squeezed lemon". When Boukreev and the other two climbers began their descent just after sundown they met Reinmar Joswig ascending and near the peak. Relying heavily on intuition and his previous mountaineering experiences, Boukreev slowly made his way down the steep rock and ice of the mountain. A crampon kept coming off of his boot, and at one point he had to use his ice axe to arrest a fall, keeping himself from sliding into the abyss. Eventually he made his way to the tents at the highest elevation camp. However, teammates Peter Metzger and Reinmar Joswig never returned from the summit, both having fallen to their death during the descent.

=== Everest ===
Boukreev became widely known as the lead climbing guide for the Mountain Madness expedition headed by Scott Fischer in May 1996. The expedition was one of several attempting to summit Everest on the same day (May 10). Soon after summiting on May 10, a disastrous blizzard struck, stranding many climbers above the South Col overnight, and by May 11, eight climbers from three different expeditions had perished. Boukreev rescued three climbers stranded in the disaster above 7,900 m, and all six of the climbing clients on the Mountain Madness expedition survived the ordeal.

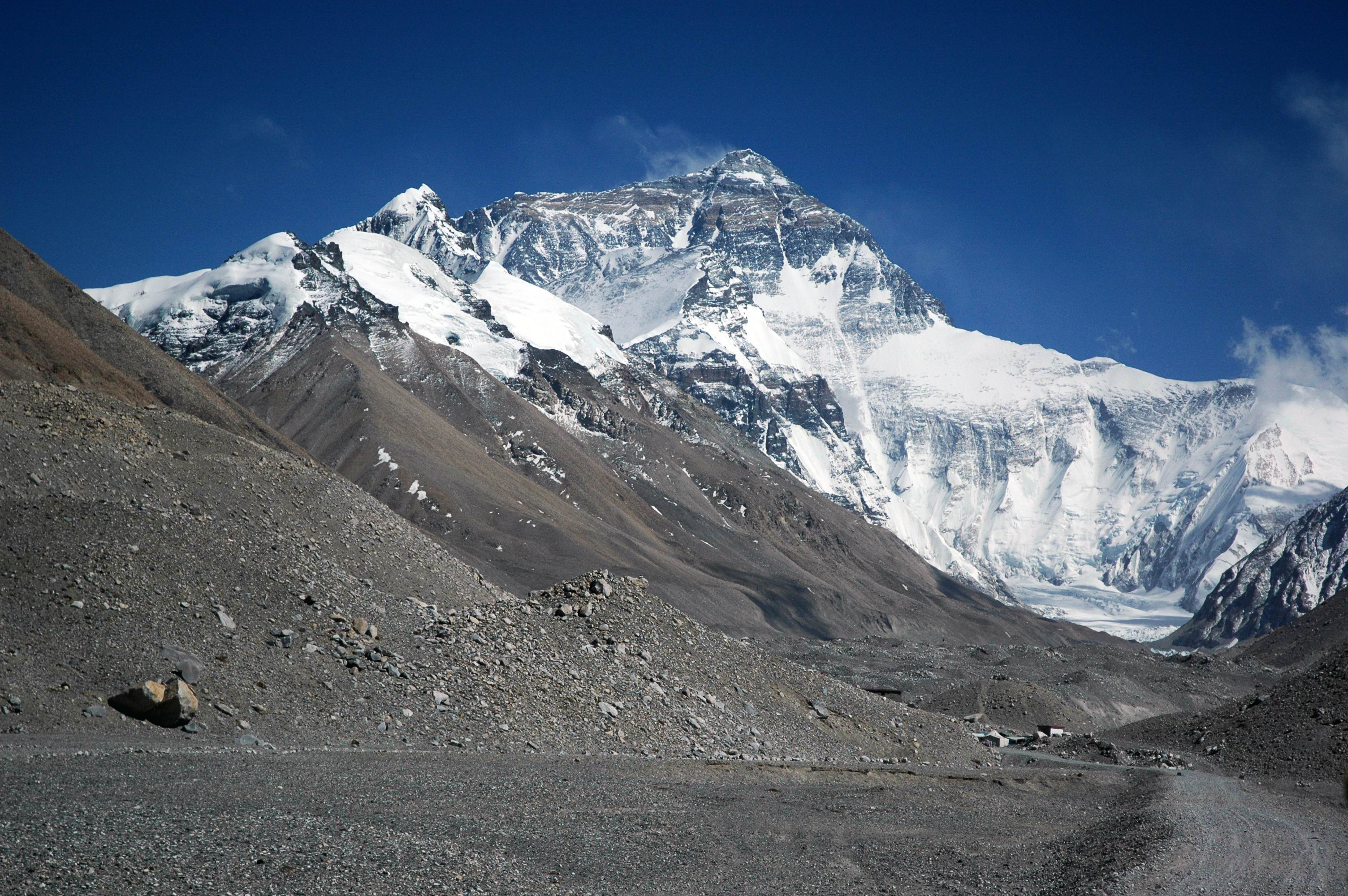
View of Mount Everest from Rongbuk Glacier

Galen Rowell described Boukreev's rescue efforts in the Wall Street Journal as:

One of the most amazing rescues in mountaineering history performed single-handedly a few hours after climbing Everest without oxygen...

== Controversy ==
The 1996 Mount Everest disaster ignited controversy. Author Jon Krakauer was critical of Boukreev in his book, Into Thin Air. Subsequently, Boukreev was contacted by various media for a response, and also wrote his own account of the events on Everest in The Climb, a book co-written with Gary Weston DeWalt.

The core of the controversy was Boukreev's decision, as was his usual practice, to summit Everest without using supplementary oxygen and to descend to the camp ahead of his clients. He was the first to reach the summit on the day of the disaster and stayed at or near the summit for nearly 1.5 hours helping others with their summit efforts, before descending and arriving at his tent shortly after 5 pm on May 10, well ahead of all the summitting clients and guides on his team.

According to Boukreev the plan to descend ahead of his clients was discussed with and approved by expedition leader Fischer.

Krakauer acknowledged Boukreev's skills as a mountaineer and said that Boukreev, a Russian who spoke English poorly, "came from a tough, proud, hardscrabble climbing culture that did not believe in coddling the weak." Mountaineer Galen Rowell pointed out that Boukreev "fixed the Hillary Step after Sherpas failed to do so, foresaw problems with clients nearing camp after dark in a storm, noted five other guides present on the mountain, and descended to the South Col to be rested and hydrated enough to respond to an emergency" of a blizzard with gale force winds. Unable to find anyone -- guides, clients, or Sherpas -- to accompany him, Boukreev undertook four solo rescue attempts during the night and found and led three climbers stranded and lost on the mountain back to the safety of the camp.

Boukreev's detractors say that had he stayed with the clients, he would have been in better position to assist them down the mountain, although every one of Boukreev's clients survived, including three (Pittman, Fox, Madsen) he rescued on May 11. The only client deaths that day were suffered by the Adventure Consultants expedition, led by guide Rob Hall, who lost his own life when he chose to stay and help a client summit the mountain past the safe turnaround time of 14:00. Reinhold Messner, who was the first to solo Everest, and with a partner the first to summit it without oxygen, criticized Boukreev, saying "no one should guide Everest without using bottled oxygen" while David Breashears pointed out that Boukreev, despite coming down first, was "sitting in his tent unable to assist anyone" until clients staggered into the camp with the information vital to the rescue of others still on the mountain. On the other hand, Messner had previously stated that "I don’t think there’s a big difference between danger and not danger, using or not using oxygen" while working as a guide. Furthermore, it was less than an hour from when Boukreev arrived at Camp IV to when he set out to search for stranded climbers, having gathered supplies and oxygen in the meantime.

According to Krakauer, Boukreev's "refusal or inability to play the role of a conventional guide" caused dissension between him and Scott Fischer (who died while returning from the summit). Several days before the summit attempt, while on the way up the mountain, Fischer had directed Boukreev to bring up the rear of the group and keep an eye on everybody, but he instead remained at Base Camp and followed the group some five hours later. When a client named Dale Kruse fell ill, Fisher personally escorted him downward to base camp. Enroute he met Boukreev climbing upward alone at the Khumbu Icefall and "harshly reprimanded the guide for shirking his responsibilities". Back at Base Camp, Fischer telephoned his Seattle business partner Karen Dickinson and publicist Jane Bromet to complain about Boukreev's actions before resuming his ascent. This, however, is disputed in The Climb, which points out that Fischer's dissatisfaction with Boukreev was about Boukreev's inability to keep rich clients pleased, and not about Boukreev's climbing performance. Mountaineer Ed Viesturs commented on Boukreev in a 2011 interview: "Anatoli was just an amazing person," Viesturs recalled. "I’d met him long before the Everest tragedy, in the early '80s when I was guiding in the Pamirs. He was one of the coaches in the Soviet sports federations back then, when I traded him gear for badly needed ice screws. One thing I gave him in return was this old fleece-lined JanSport bomber hat, he wore that thing on almost all his climbs after that. Anatoli spoke English very poorly, and for that reason a lot of people did not appreciate his skill as a climber and did not realize how thoughtful, introspective and poetic he was."

When that same day Fischer was stranded on the mountain and dying of hypoxia and frostbite, his last request was for Boukreev to be sent to his rescue. Boukreev undertook a fourth rescue alone but arrived too late to save Fischer.

Before returning to the U.S. after the events on Everest in 1996, Boukreev climbed the 8,516-metre (27,940 ft) Lhotse, which is near Everest. He decided on a solo ascent because he hoped that in the process of climbing it he might find some inner clarity to what had just transpired on Everest.

In 1997 Boukreev was awarded the David A. Sowles Memorial Award by the American Alpine Club. The award recognizes people "who have distinguished themselves, with unselfish devotion at personal risk or sacrifice of a major objective, in going to the assistance of fellow climbers imperiled in the mountains. It is dedicated to the memory of David A. Sowles." It was presented to him by Jim Wickwire, the first American to summit K2. The award is the American Alpine Club's highest award for valor in recognition of his role in rescuing climbers in the 1996 Everest disaster.

== Death ==
Three weeks after receiving the David A. Sowles Memorial Award, Boukreev began his attempt to climb the south face of Annapurna I (8,091 m or 26,545 ft) along with Simone Moro, an accomplished Italian mountaineer. They were accompanied by Dimitri Sobolev, a cinematographer from Kazakhstan who was documenting the attempt. On December 25 around noon, Boukreev and Moro were fixing ropes in a couloir at around the 5,700 m (18,700 ft) level.

Suddenly, an enormous cornice broke loose from the heights of Annapurna's Western Wall and rumbled down the 800 m (2,600 ft) long couloir. The avalanche knocked Moro down the mountain where he landed just above their tent at Camp I 5,200 m (17,100 ft). Miraculously, Moro had somehow stayed near the top of the avalanche debris and managed to dig himself out after a few minutes. Unable to see or hear any signs of Boukreev or Sobolev (whom Moro had witnessed disappearing beneath "car-sized blocks of ice"), Moro descended to Annapurna base camp where he was flown by helicopter back to Kathmandu for surgery on his hands, which had been ripped down to the tendons during the fall.

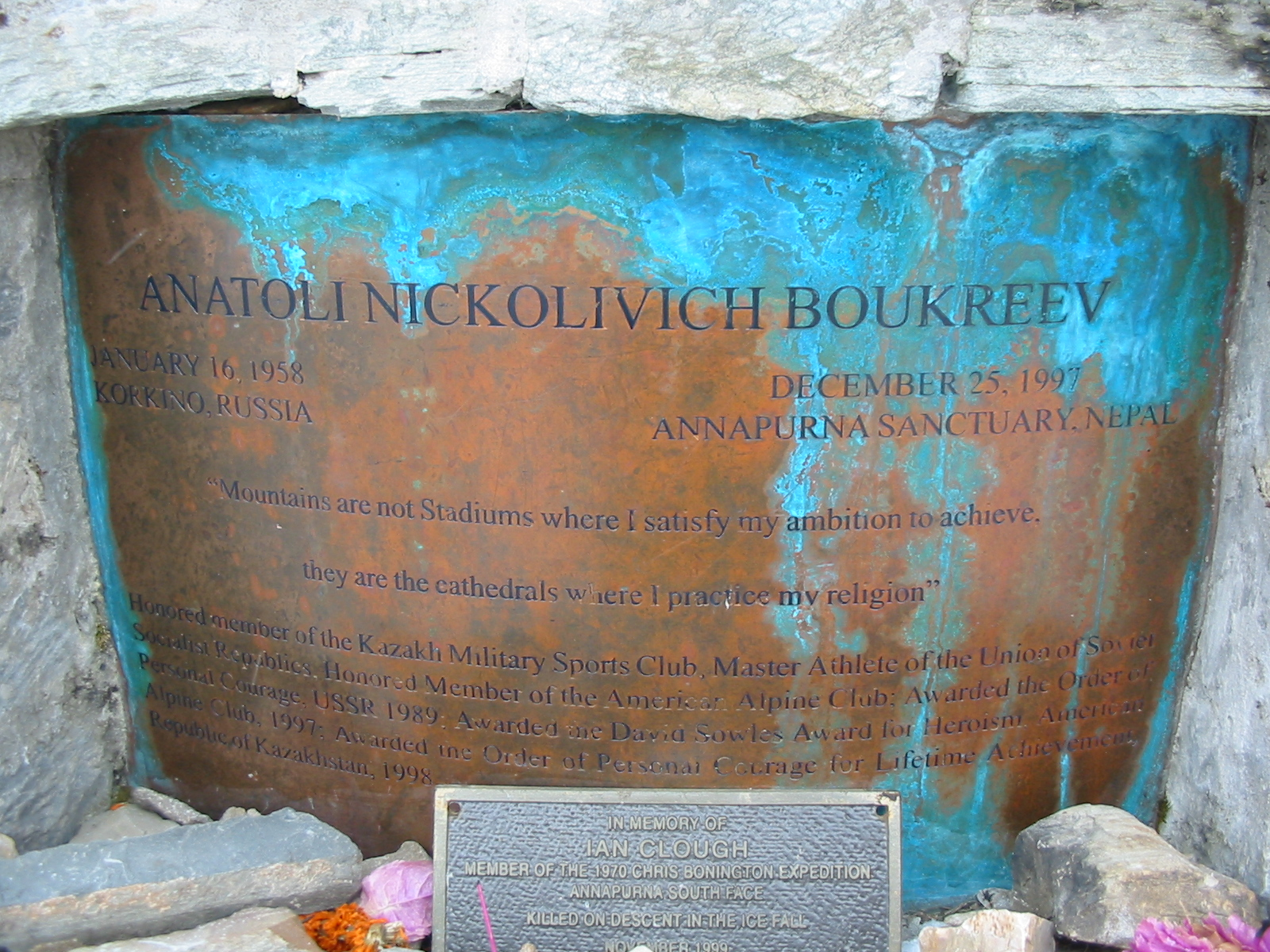
Anatoli Boukreev memorial at Annapurna base camp

News of the accident reached New Mexico on December 26. Linda Wylie, Boukreev's girlfriend, left for Nepal on December 28. Several attempts were made to reach the avalanche site by helicopter but inclement weather in late December prevented search teams from reaching Camp I. On January 3, 1998, searchers were finally able to reach Camp I and an empty tent. Linda Wylie subsequently issued a somber statement from Kathmandu:

This is the end... there are no hopes of finding him alive.

Boukreev had dreamt in detail of dying in an avalanche nine months before his death. The only thing missing was the name of the mountain. When Boukreev's companion tried to convince him to take a different path in life to avoid a fate that Boukreev was convinced of, he responded, "Mountains are my life...my work. It is too late for me to take up another road."

=== Memorial ===
At the site of Annapurna base camp there is a memorial chorten to Boukreev including one of his favorite quotes:

"Mountains are not stadiums where I satisfy my ambition to achieve, they are the cathedrals where I practice my religion."

On January 18, 2023, a sculpture of Boukreev by Nurlan Dalbai was unveiled at the Medeu ice rink. The mountaineer is shown at rest with his hand on an ice axe.

Boukreev Summit (3010m) near Almaty, Kazakhstan, is named after Boukreev.

== In popular culture ==
Icelandic actor Ingvar Eggert Sigurðsson portrays Boukreev in the Baltasar Kormákur film, Everest, about the 1996 Everest disaster.

Polish and American actor Peter J. Lucas portrays Boukreev in the television disaster film, Into Thin Air: Death on Everest, based on the book Into Thin Air about the 1996 Everest disaster by Jon Krakauer.

== Bibliography ==
- The Climb: Tragic Ambitions on Everest by Anatoli Boukreev and Gary Weston DeWalt, published by St. Martins Paperbacks, 1997, ISBN 0-312-96533-8.
- Above the Clouds: The Diaries of a High-Altitude Mountaineer, written by Anatoli Boukreev. Collected and edited by Linda Wylie; published by St. Martin's Griffin, 2002, ISBN 0-312-29137-X.

== See also ==
- List of climbers
- List of Mount Everest summiters by number of times to the summit
