= David A. Sowles Memorial Award =

American Alpine Club's highest award

The David A. Sowles Memorial Award is the American Alpine Club's highest award for valour, bestowed at irregular intervals on mountaineers who have "distinguished themselves, with unselfish devotion at personal risk or sacrifice of a major objective, in going to the assistance of fellow climbers imperilled in the mountains." It is named after David A. Sowles, a climber who died in the Alps in 1963.

Notable recipients include the members of the Third American Karakoram Expedition for their attempted rescue of Art Gilkey on K2 in 1953, Pete Athans, Todd Burleson and Anatoli Boukreev for their part in the 1996 Mount Everest disaster, Ed Viesturs for two separate rescues on K2 in 1992, and Simone Moro for his rescue of young mountaineer Tom Moores in 2001.
