= Araceli Segarra =

Catalan mountaineer, host and motivational speaker

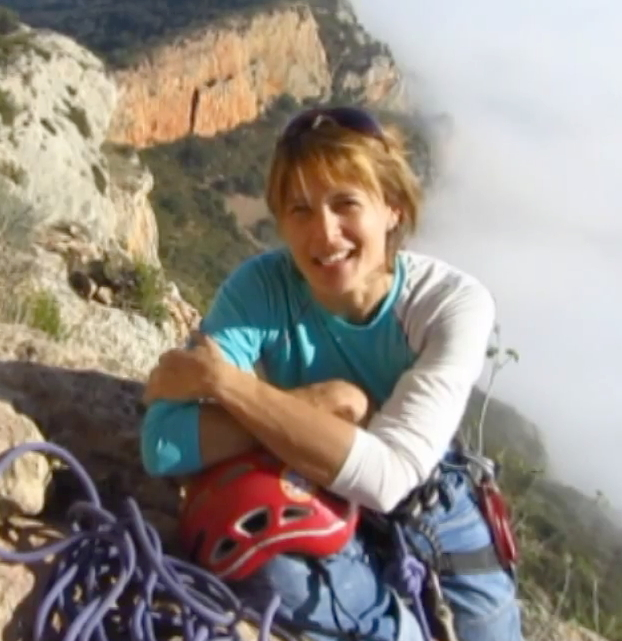
Araceli Segarra

Araceli Segarra (born March 1970 in Lleida, Spain) is the first Spanish woman to have climbed Mount Everest and the Seven Summits. She has also climbed Broad Peak (1991) Shishapangma (1992), K2 (2002), Kanchenjunga (2005) and Nanga Parbat (2008).

== Education and personal interests ==
Segarra has a degree in Physiotherapy. She became interested in mountain sports at age 15 when taking a spelunking course; she also enjoys randonee skiing, rock climbing, and ice climbing.

== Career ==
In 1996, while being filmed for the IMAX documentary, EVEREST (1998), she participated on the rescue team during the May 1996 Mount Everest disaster and is credited with the idea of marking a rescue helicopter landing location with an "X" made of red Kool-Aid.

In addition to her climbing career, she has written and illustrated several children's books, like "Los Viajes de Tina".

== Mountains climbed ==
- Mount Kosciuszko (1987)
- Kilimanjaro (1987)
- Mount Elbrus (1988)
- Aconcagua (1988)
- Mont Blanc (1989)
- Denali (1990)
- Broad Peak (1991)
- Shishapangma (1992)
- Puncak Jaya (1994)
- Mount Everest (1996)
- Vinson Massif (1999)
- K2 (2002)
- Kanchenjunga (2005)
- Nanga Parbat (2008)

== See also ==
- List of 20th-century summiters of Mount Everest
