= Everest (2015 film) =

2015 film directed by Baltasar Kormákur

- Theatrical release poster
- Directed by: Baltasar Kormákur
- Written by: William Nicholson; Simon Beaufoy
- Based on: Left for Dead by; Beck Weathers; Stephen G. Michaud; "The Death Zone" by Peter Wilkinson
- Produced by: Tim Bevan; Eric Fellner; Baltasar Kormákur; Nicky Kentish Barnes; Tyler Thompson; Brian Oliver
- Starring: Jason Clarke; Josh Brolin; John Hawkes; Robin Wright; Emily Watson; Keira Knightley; Sam Worthington; Jake Gyllenhaal
- Cinematography: Salvatore Totino
- Edited by: Mick Audsley
- Music by: Dario Marianelli
- Production companies: Cross Creek Pictures; Walden Media; RVK Studios; Working Title Films
- Distributed by: Universal Pictures
- Release dates: 2 September 2015 (Venice); 18 September 2015 (United States and Iceland)
- Running time: 121 minutes
- Countries: United Kingdom; United States; Iceland
- Language: English
- Budget: $55 million
- Box office: $221.3 million

Everest is a 2015 biographical survival film directed and produced by Baltasar Kormákur and written by William Nicholson and Simon Beaufoy. It stars an ensemble cast of Jason Clarke, Jake Gyllenhaal, Josh Brolin, John Hawkes, Robin Wright, Michael Kelly, Sam Worthington, Keira Knightley, Martin Henderson and Emily Watson. Based on the 1996 Mount Everest disaster in which eight climbers died, it focuses on the survival attempts of two expedition groups, one led by Rob Hall (Clarke) and the other by Scott Fischer (Gyllenhaal). Kormákur, Universal Pictures, Walden Media, Cross Creek Pictures and Working Title Films dedicated the film to the late British actress Natasha Richardson.

The film opened the 72nd Venice International Film Festival on 2 September 2015, and was released theatrically on 18 September 2015. It was first released in IMAX 3D on 11 September 2015, in the UK and in IMAX 3D, RealD 3D, and 2D internationally, and exclusively in IMAX 3D on 19 September 2015, as a limited release in the United States and Canada, and along 36 other countries. It began a wide release in the United States on 25 September 2015. The film was a commercial success, grossing $221 million worldwide against a $55 million budget and received positive reviews from critics.

== Plot ==
In May 1996, several commercial expeditions at the base camp of Mount Everest prepare to climb to the summit. Rob Hall, who popularized commercial Everest missions, leads Adventure Consultants; Scott Fischer is the chief guide for its rival, Mountain Madness. Rob's clients include Beck Weathers, an experienced climber; Doug Hansen, a former mailman pursuing his dream; climbing veteran Yasuko Namba, who hopes to complete her final Seven Summits ascent; and Outside magazine journalist Jon Krakauer. Helen Wilton manages Rob's base camp.

A month earlier in New Zealand, Rob says goodbye to his pregnant wife Jan, promising he will be home for the birth. At the base camp, Rob receives a fax from her, informing him that their unborn baby is a girl. He wants to name her Sarah, but she disagrees.

Worried about climbers overcrowding, Rob persuades Scott to cooperate to reduce delays. On the summit attempt, Rob's group departs from Camp IV before dawn, planning to complete the ascent and begin descending by 2:00 PM., the latest safe time to ensure return before nightfall.

The group is delayed by over an hour after discovering that guide ropes are not installed on the upper reaches of the climb. Beck has eyesight problems and stops. Rob tells him to return to base camp if his condition does not improve in a half-hour. Scott hurries down to camp to help another climber but plans to re-ascend, and Rob warns him about overexertion.

Rob reaches the summit on time and is joined by other climbers including Yasuko, who jubilantly plants her Japanese flag. Descending, Rob encounters Doug struggling to ascend just above the Hillary Step and orders him to descend.

Doug insists on continuing, saying that he will not get the chance again. Rob reluctantly agrees and they reach the summit two hours later, well past the safe return time. Doug is exhausted and suffering from altitude sickness. With them is Scott, exhausted and ill from high-altitude pulmonary edema.

As Rob helps Doug descend, a blizzard strikes while Doug's oxygen tank is empty, causing him to suffer hypoxia. No extra bottles are stored on the route as Rob asked and he radios Helen to send more oxygen. Doug, left briefly by Rob, semi-consciously detaches himself from the guide rope and walks unsteadily along the narrow path, then silently topples to his death.

Scott's condition worsens. He tells his fellow climbers to continue descending without him. He lies down and later dies. Descending climbers reach Beck, whose vision remains impaired, but they all become lost as the blizzard obliterates the trail. Three climbers go for help, leaving Beck and Yasuko. Guide Andy 'Harold' Harris reaches Rob with spare oxygen, but the cylinder aperture is frozen shut. They huddle together in the storm.

While Rob sleeps, Andy begins to have hallucinations. He then strips off his outer clothing and slides to his death. In the morning, Rob radios Helen that Doug and Andy are gone and that his extremities are frozen. Helen calls Jan, hoping that Rob will respond to her voice. Jan tells him that he must start moving. Rob tells her that he is cold but otherwise comfortable, and asks her to name their baby Sarah, dying soon afterward.

Returning climbers tell the camp that Beck and Yasuko are stranded. The weather, however, makes a rescue impossible. Helen calls Beck's wife Peach, informing her of the situation.

In the morning, Beck miraculously awakens, sees that Yasuko is dead, and stumbles down to camp alone, severely frostbitten and in need of medical help. Peach calls the American Embassy and organizes a helicopter rescue. Nepal Army pilot Lt. Col. Madan Khatri Chhetri flies a high-altitude mission to take Beck to the hospital.

Meanwhile, one of Scott's guides, Anatoli Boukreev, finds his body and moves it off the trail. Returning home, Helen has an emotional reunion with Jan, who later gives birth and names her daughter Sarah. Beck returns to his family, heavily bandaged. Closing titles reveal that he eventually lost both hands and nose to frostbite and that Rob's body (as well as those of the other climbers who died) remains on Everest.

== Cast ==
- Jason Clarke as Rob Hall, a New Zealand expedition group leader.
- Josh Brolin as Beck Weathers, an American doctor and amateur mountain climber.
- John Hawkes as Doug Hansen, a mailman and amateur mountain climber.
- Robin Wright as Peach Weathers, Beck's wife.
- Emily Watson as Helen Wilton, the base camp manager.
- Michael Kelly as Jon Krakauer, a journalist and amateur mountain climber.
- Sam Worthington as Guy Cotter, a professional guide.
- Keira Knightley as Jan Arnold, Hall's pregnant wife.
- Martin Henderson as Andy "Harold" Harris, a professional guide.
- Elizabeth Debicki as Dr. Caroline Mackenzie, the base camp physician.
- Ingvar Sigurdsson as Anatoli Boukreev, a professional with Scott's team.
- Jake Gyllenhaal as Scott Fischer, an American expedition group leader.
- Thomas M. Wright as Michael Groom, an Australian mountain climber.
- Mark Derwin as Lou Kasischke, a mountain climber on Hall's team.
- Justin Salinger as Ian Woodall, a British mountain climber who has climbed Mount Everest several times.
- Naoko Mori as Yasuko Namba, an experienced amateur mountain climber.
- Clive Standen as Ed Viesturs
- Amy Shindler as Charlotte Fox
- Vanessa Kirby as Sandy Hill
- Tom Goodman-Hill as Neal Beidleman, a professional guide on Fischer's team.
- Charlotte Bøving as Lene Gammelgaard, a successful Danish climber in Fischer's group.
- Micah Hauptman as David Breashears, a documentary filmmaker and mountaineer.
- Chris Reilly as Klev Schoening, a mountain climber on Fischer's team.
- Chike Chan as Makalu Gau, the leader of the Taiwanese expedition.
- Vijaya Lama as Lt. Col. Madan Khatri Chhetri, a Nepalese Army helicopter pilot.
- Mia Goth as Meg Weathers, Beck's daughter.
- Pemba Sherpa as Lopsang, Sherpa guide for Fischer's team.
- Ang Phula Sherpa as Ang Dorje, Sherpa guide for Hall's team.

== Production ==
=== Development ===
Baltasar Kormákur directed the film which was written by Simon Beaufoy and Mark Medoff, with early script adaptations carried out by Justin Isbell and William Nicholson. The screenplay, credited to Nicholson and Beaufoy, is based on the 2000 autobiography Left for Dead: My Journey Home from Everest by Beck Weathers with Stephen G. Michaud, and the 1996 Men's Journal article "The Death Zone" by Peter Wilkinson. The film was produced by Working Title Films. Universal Pictures distributed the film in the United States. The film was produced by Tim Bevan and Eric Fellner, and was set to start shooting in November 2013. In September 2013, Emmett/Furla/Oasis Films were set to co-finance the film, but in October they exited as co-financiers.

After the production start date of 6 November 2013 had passed, Cross Creek Pictures and Walden Media joined the production on 12 November 2013, and financed the film with $65 million. The film started production on 13 January 2014, in the Ötztal Alps in Italy, after which production moved to Nepal and Iceland. On 11 December 2013, The Hollywood Reporter posted that South Tyrol's regional film board added $1 million to the film's funding.

In February 2013, Christian Bale was in talks to join the cast of the disaster film to play Rob Hall, the leader of a New Zealand group who ran Adventure Consultants. On 17 July 2013, Jake Gyllenhaal, Josh Brolin, Jason Clarke and John Hawkes were cast as leads in the film. Bale dropped out around this time. Gyllenhaal played Scott Fischer, the leader of the Mountain Madness expedition; Brolin played Weathers, a doctor; Clarke took the role of Rob Hall, also an expedition leader; and Hawkes played Doug Hansen, one of Rob Hall's clients, who encounters difficulties on the descent from the summit of Everest.

On 4 February 2014, Clive Standen also joined the cast, while shooting was underway. On 7 February 2014, more cast members were added to the film, including Martin Henderson, Emily Watson, Thomas M. Wright, and Michael Kelly. Watson played a motherly base camp figure who works closely with Rob Hall, and Kelly played Into Thin Air author Jon Krakauer. On 17 February 2014, actor Micah Hauptman was added to the cast in the role of filmmaker and mountaineer David Breashears, who directed the 1998 IMAX documentary film Everest. On 24 March 2014, Sam Worthington and Robin Wright joined the cast. Worthington played Guy Cotter and Wright played Beck Weathers' wife, Peach.

=== Filming ===
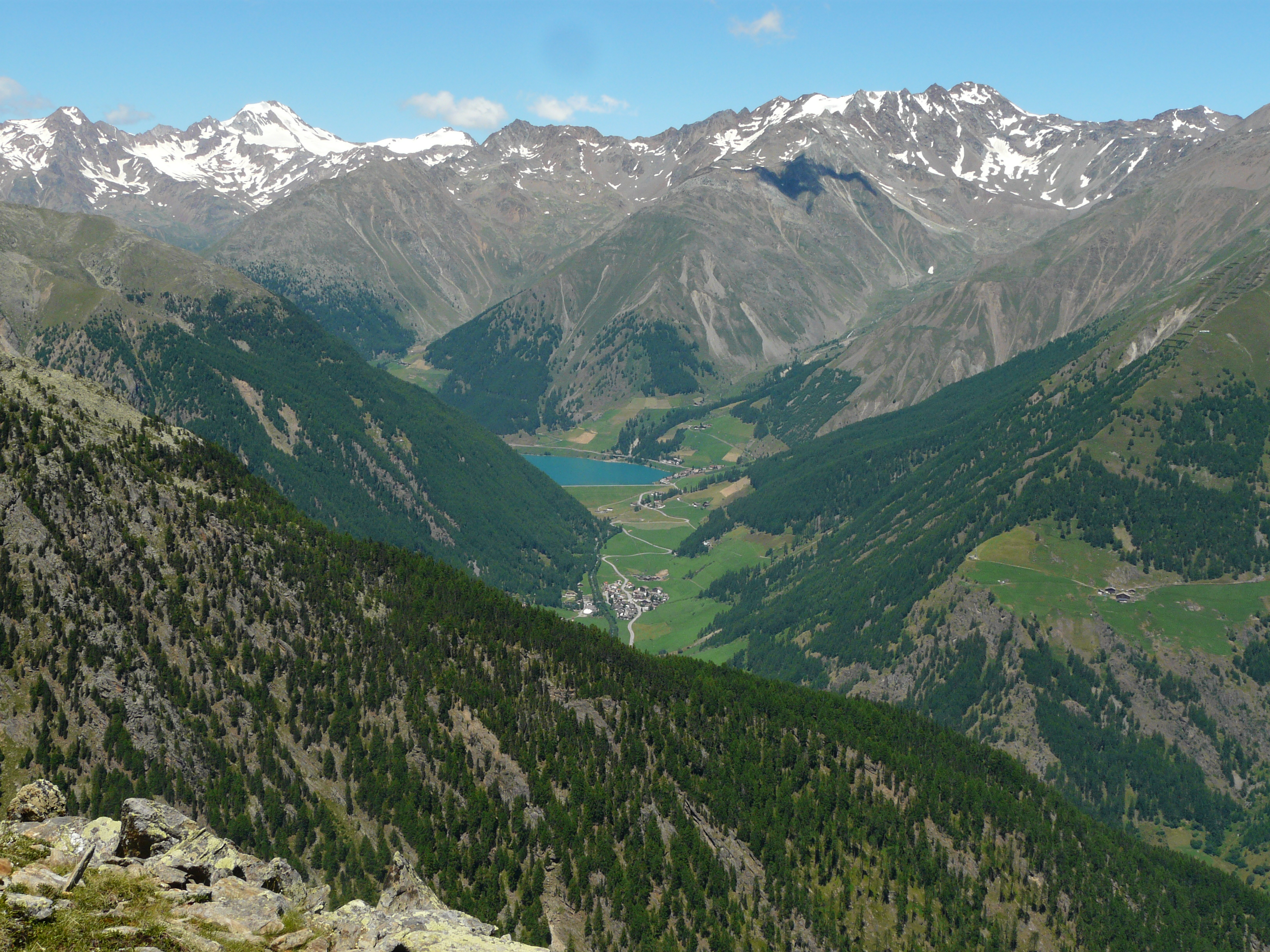
Additional portions of the film, including scenes that take place just above the icefall to camp 3, were filmed at 10,000 feet at Schnalstal/Val Senales in South Tyrol, Italy.

In November 2013, the film was set for a 13 January 2014 production start date in Italy. Co-financier Brian Oliver told Variety they would shoot in Ötztal Alps in Italy for six weeks, a month in Iceland, and then move to Nepal for another month's shoot. In early January 2014, actors Gyllenhaal and Brolin were practicing for climbing mountains in the Santa Monica Mountains, to train for their roles.

The 44-member crew arrived on 12 January 2014 in Nepal and stayed in Kathmandu. They had permission to film from 9 to 23 January 2014. Later filming on Everest commenced on 13 January 2014. On 14 January 2014, Brolin and Hawkes filmed shots at local terminal of Tribhuvan International Airport, and then they were to be filming at Lukla Airport on 15 January 2014, then to Namche Bazaar, and later at the Everest Base Camp, news confirmed. After shooting completed in Nepal, the crews were to move to Italy (Schnalstal and Rome), and then in early March to the United Kingdom, to film at Pinewood Studios.

English actor Clive Standen has said that filming on location in freezing temperatures had been "tough but fun". On 24 March 2014 the shooting was said to be taking place at the Everest Base Camp in Nepal. Base camp exteriors were filmed on the backlot at Cinecitta Studios in Rome, where bright sunlight could be achieved to resemble the lighting at the base camp.

On 18 April 2014, while the second unit crew was shooting the remaining scenes of the film at Camp II on Everest, an avalanche struck, killing 16 Sherpa guides. The Sherpas were carrying equipment and supplies to camps for climbers in advance of the start of the summer climbing season. Deadline reported there were no injuries or fatalities affecting the film crew. The production was not present where the disaster took place, but they were nearby. Filming at Pinewood Studios in England was just about to finish, but the second unit was shooting at the camp which then had to halt the production for some time. Hillary Step, camp 4, icefall and the summit were built on the 007 stage at Pinewood Studios with greenscreen for CG backgrounds. Totino said, "It was very challenging because we had to re-create the sun, which at Everest is so incredibly sharp and crisp." The team used SoftSun lights to create a sun on the summit, Hillary Step, and icefall. "They were 9 feet long and 3 ½ feet in diameter and 100,000 watts. They had to be moved around on cranes because they are very heavy," Totino said. To photograph one scene during which expedition guide Rob Hall (Jason Clarke) is stuck on the mountain in the storm, Totino recalled: "We tented off a portion of the set with some very heavy plastic and brought in these giant refrigerating units, half the size of a semi-truck, and we cooled that part of the stage down to about 26 to 28 degrees Fahrenheit [around -3°C] and brought in real snow. Baltasar really wanted the actor to feel like he was frozen. You really see and feel that." The film was shot with Arri Alexa XT cameras, using the Arriraw format.

=== Music ===
Dario Marianelli composed the music for the film. The film uses the song "Yeh ladka hai Allah" from the Bollywood film Kabhi Khushi Kabhie Gham (2001), when the climbing party first arrives in Nepal. The song plays on the bus when it passes through a busy Nepali bazaar. Another song in the film is "All I Wanna Do", performed by Sheryl Crow, which is accurate to the timing of the film's events, in 1996. The song "Weather with You" by Crowded House also features in the film. The soundtrack was released on 18 September 2015 by Varèse Sarabande.

== Release ==
Universal Pictures had originally slated the film for a 27 February 2015 release date in the United States and Canada. However, the film was released on 18 September 2015 exclusively in IMAX 3D, followed by a wide theatrical release on 25 September 2015. In the US and Canada, it was released in Dolby Vision format in Dolby Cinema, the first ever for Universal Pictures. It was screened at the 2015 CineEurope on 23 June 2015 at the Centre Convencions Internacional Barcelona in full 3D Dolby Atmos. The film's world premiere took place on 2 September 2015 at the 72nd Venice International Film Festival in the Sala Grande, at the city's Palazzo del Cinema in Venice. DVD, Blu-ray and Blu-ray 3D versions were released on 19 January 2016. On 27 September 2016, Universal Studios Home Entertainment released a 4K Ultra HD Blu-ray Disc edition of the film.

== Reception ==
=== Box office ===
Everest grossed $43.5 million in North America and $177.8 million in other territories, for a worldwide total of $221.3 million, against a budget of $55 million. Everest had the biggest September worldwide IMAX opening with $7.2 million, breaking the record previously held by Resident Evil: Retribution ($6 million).

Before its wide theatrical opening in the United States and Canada on 25 September, the film received a limited release in IMAX 3D and other premium large format screens across 545 theaters on 18 September to build good word of mouth. It made $325,000 from 481 IMAX screens and premium large-format screens from late night showings, which began at 7 pm, and an estimated $2.3 million on its opening day. It finished the weekend at number five with $7.6 million from 368 IMAX and 177 premium large-format theaters. IMAX comprised 78% ($5.8 million) of the opening weekend gross while premium large formats contributed 22% ($1.7 million). This broke the record for the biggest IMAX September debut (breaking The Equalizer's $3.1 million record in 2014). Everest is the first major film since Mission: Impossible – Ghost Protocol (2011) to receive IMAX only release for more than two days (The Walk became the next when it replaced Everest on 30 September 2015).

Everest expanded into a total of 3,006 theaters on Friday after a limited 3D, IMAX, and other premium large formats engagement. It earned $4 million on its wide opening day on Friday. During its wide opening weekend it earned $13.09 million from 3,006 theaters of which $3.7 million came from 366 IMAX screens raising its total North America IMAX revenue to $11.5 million—the first ever September IMAX release to reach past $10 million. The largest demographic of the opening weekend audience was male (51%) and under the age of 35 (45%).

Everest was released in a total of 65 countries. In its opening weekend, it grossed $28.8 million from 5,154 screens from 36 markets opening at No. 1 in 12 countries. IMAX comprised $3 million of the opening gross. In its second weekend, it expanded to 22 more markets earning $33.9 million from 62 markets—topping the box office. Russia and the CIS posted the highest opening with $5.2 million followed by the United Kingdom, Ireland and Malta ($4.9 million), Mexico ($4.4 million), Germany ($2.9 million) and Australia ($2.4 million). In terms of total earnings, the United Kingdom ($16 million) and Germany ($9.3 million) are the largest markets. It became the 8th Universal Pictures film of 2015 to cross the £10 million mark in the United Kingdom. The only other studios ever to achieve the feat are 20th Century Fox in 2014 and Paramount Pictures in 2011. It opened in China on 3 November and Japan on 6 November and grossed $11.3 million and $1.4 million respectively debuting both at No. 4 at the box office. In China notably, despite having the advantage of securing all the IMAX screens, it had to face serious competition with Hollywood counterparts such as Maze Runner: The Scorch Trials, The Peanuts Movie and four new local movies that all opened that same week. It grossed a total of $16 million in China and $5.1 million in Japan.

=== Critical response ===
On Rotten Tomatoes, the film holds a rating of 73%, based on 236 reviews, with an average rating of 6.7/10. The site's consensus reads, "Everest boasts all the dizzying cinematography a person could hope to get out of a movie about mountain climbers, even if it's content to tread less challenging narrative terrain." On Metacritic the film has a score of 64 out of 100, based on 39 critics, indicating "generally favorable" reviews. Audiences surveyed by CinemaScore gave the film an average grade of "A" on an A+ to F scale.

Jon Krakauer, author of Into Thin Air, denounced the movie, stating some of its details were fabricated and defamatory. He also expressed regret regarding Sony's rapid acquisition of the rights to the book. Director Baltasar Kormákur responded, claiming Krakauer's first-person account was not used as source material for the film and alleging that Krakauer's version conflicted with actual events.

=== Accolades ===
Award	Category	Nominee(s)	Result
Camerimage	Best 3D Film	Salvatore Totino	Nominated
Screen Actors Guild Awards	Outstanding Performance by a Stunt Ensemble in a Motion Picture		Nominated
Satellite Awards	Best Effects		Nominated
Visual Effects Society	Outstanding Supporting Visual Effects in a Photoreal Feature	Dadi Einarsson, Roma O-Connor, Matthias Bjarnsasson, Richard Van Den Bergh	Nominated
Visual Effects Society	Outstanding Models in a Photoreal or Animated Project ("Mt. Everest")	Matthias Bjarnasson, Olafur Haraldsson, Kjartan Hardarson, Peter Arnorsson	Nominated
Saturn Awards	Best Action or Adventure Film		Nominated

== See also ==
- List of people who died climbing Mount Everest
- Mount Everest in popular culture
- Survival film, about the film genre, with a list of related films
- Into Thin Air: Death on Everest
- After the Wind, a book by Lou Kasischke detailing his experiences as a client on Rob Hall's expedition
- Vertical Limit, a similarly themed film
- North Face, a similarly themed film
