= Everest (1998 film) =

1998 American documentary film by Greg MacGillivray and David Breashears

- DVD cover
- Directed by: Greg MacGillivray; David Breashears
- Written by: Tim Cahill; Stephen Judson
- Produced by: Stephen Judson; Alec Lorimore; Greg MacGillivray
- Starring: Beck Weathers; Jamling Tenzing Norgay; Araceli Segarra; Ed Viesturs; Paula Viesturs; Sumiyo Tsuzuki
- Narrated by: Liam Neeson
- Cinematography: David Breashears
- Edited by: Stephen Judson
- Music by: Steve Wood; Daniel May; George Harrison (songs)
- Distributed by: MacGillivray Freeman Films (theatrical); Miramax (home video)
- Release date: March 6, 1998
- Running time: 45 minutes
- Country: United States
- Language: English
- Box office: $87 million

Everest is a 70mm American documentary film, from MacGillivray Freeman Films, about the struggles involved in climbing Mount Everest, the highest mountain peak on Earth, located in the Himalayan region of Nepal and Tibet. It was released to IMAX theaters in March 1998 and became the highest-grossing film made in the IMAX format.

== Production ==
The 45-minute documentary is narrated by Irish actor Liam Neeson and was filmed entirely in IMAX. It includes a description of the training required in order to climb the 29,031 feet to the summit of Mount Everest and the challenges faced during the ascent, such as avalanches, blizzards, and oxygen deprivation. The film centers on a team led by Ed Viesturs and Everest director David Breashears; among their number are Spanish climber Araceli Segarra, and Jamling Tenzing Norgay, son of the pioneering Sherpa mountaineer Tenzing Norgay.

Everest was in production at the mountain during the 1996 Mount Everest disaster, in which another group of climbers became trapped by a blizzard near the summit. The film includes footage of these events, as the IMAX team assist Beck Weathers and other survivors. Producer and co-director Greg MacGillivray later said that while editing the documentary for release, he and Breashears decided to focus more on the tragedy, due to the popularity of Jon Krakauer's book about the 1996 disaster, Into Thin Air (1997). MacGillivray said "Ten million people have read that book, so we had to address the issue. And I think it strengthened the film."

== Release and reception ==
Everest premiered at Boston's Museum of Science on March 4, 1998 before going on general release in IMAX cinemas across the United States two days later. According to an article published late that month in the Los Angeles Times, it attracted mainly favorable reviews. The film subsequently opened in Australia on March 19 and Switzerland on March 20, with other European premieres, including at the London Trocadero, following during April and May.

=== Box office ===
Everest grossed $128 million worldwide during its theatrical run – a figure that remains the highest gross for an IMAX documentary. With domestic takings of $87,178,599, it is the second highest-grossing film (documentary or otherwise) to never reach the top ten in the weekly North American box office charts, and also the second highest-grossing film never to have made the weekly top five.

== DVD and soundtrack album ==
The DVD was released by Miramax on December 12, 1999. It includes a "Making of" featurette, an extended interview with Beck Weathers, deleted scenes, climber video journals, and a 3D map of Mount Everest.

The soundtrack features songs by George Harrison, which composers Steve Wood and Daniel May reinterpreted in the Tibetan folk style as part of their film score. The Everest soundtrack album was released by Ark 21 Records, on March 10, 1998. The music was performed by the Northwest Sinfonia, with May credited as conductor.

The Harrison songs include "All Things Must Pass", "Give Me Love (Give Me Peace on Earth)", "Here Comes the Sun", "This Is Love" and "Life Itself". Harrison agreed to their use in the film on the understanding that his name would not be used for publicity. According to author Elliot Huntley, MacGillivray chose Harrison's music for its "spiritual quality" and "his ties to eastern religion".

== Quotes ==
Narrator: Just above the high camp, a climber named Beck Weathers had been out in the storm for over 22 hours. He had been left for dead by other climbers, and then, nearly blind, his hands literally frozen solid, Beck stood up, left his pack, and desperately tried to walk.

Weathers: All I knew was that as long as my legs would run and I could stand up, I was gonna move toward that camp, and if I fell down, I was gonna get up. And if I fell down again, I was gonna get up. And I was gonna keep movin' till I either hit that camp, or walked off the face of that mountain.

Paula Viesturs: The difference between me and Ed is, when we go for a five-hour bike ride, I call it a workout … He calls it a warm-up.

== Cast ==
- Liam Neeson as narrator (voice)
- Beck Weathers
- Jamling Tenzing Norgay, son of famed Sherpa Tenzing Norgay
- Araceli Segarra
- Ed Viesturs
- Paula Viesturs
- Sumiyo Tsuzuki

== See also ==
- Everest (2015), a biographical film about the same events
- The Alps (2007), IMAX documentary film about climbing the north face of the Eiger, in the Bernese Alps
- Into Thin Air (1997), book featuring a personal account
- The Climb: Tragic Ambitions on Everest (1997), book featuring a personal account
- List of highest-grossing documentary films
