= Ed Viesturs =

American mountain climber

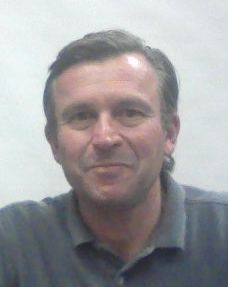
- Ed Viesturs, 2008

Personal information
- Nationality: American
- Born: Edmund Viesturs; June 22, 1959 (age 67) Fort Wayne, Indiana, U.S.
- Website: EdViesturs.com

Climbing career
- Type of climber: Mountaineer
- Known for: First American to climb all 14 eight-thousanders; 5th person to do so without supplementary oxygen.

Edmund Viesturs (born June 22, 1959) is an American high-altitude mountaineer, corporate speaker, and well known author in the mountain climbing community. He was the first American to climb all 14 of the eight-thousander mountains, and the 5th person to do so without supplemental oxygen. In 2023, Guinness World Records reclassified the first person to summit the true summits of all 8000ers and awarded Viesturs the record of the first ascent of all 14 peaks. This claim has been disputed, including by Viesturs himself.

Viesturs took part in the 1996 IMAX filming of Everest shortly after the 1996 Mount Everest disaster, which became the highest grossing documentary up to that time. Thirteen days after the disaster, his team summited Everest accompanied by a film crew. He also had a cameo in the 2000 film Vertical Limit. Clive Standen plays Viesturs in the 2015 remake of Everest telling of the 1996 Mount Everest disaster.

== Early life ==
Viesturs was born in Fort Wayne, Indiana, of Latvian and German descent. He was raised in Rockford, Illinois, Viesturs moved to Seattle, Washington in 1977 to attend the University of Washington. It was here that he began his mountaineering career on the slopes of Mount Rainier. Viesturs graduated from the University of Washington in 1981 with a BS in zoology and worked as a guide for Rainier Mountaineering. He later obtained a Doctor of Veterinary Medicine degree from Washington State University.

== Climbing career ==
His interest in mountaineering was sparked in high school by reading Maurice Herzog's account of the first climb of Annapurna, titled Annapurna. After climbing Kangchenjunga in 1989, Mount Everest in 1990 and K2 in 1992, Viesturs became an international mountain guide and was sponsored for full-time mountaineering. He served as a guide for Rob Hall's Adventure Consultants company during their 1995 Everest expedition. Viesturs climbs with Finnish partner Veikka Gustafsson.

In 1992, he and fellow American Scott Fischer brought down French climber Chantal Mauduit, suffering from exhaustion, after her summit of K2. Viesturs was in the IMAX climbing team during the 1996 Everest Disaster. He was featured in David Breashears' documentary film Everest (1998), and filming was delayed as a blizzard struck. The IMAX team postponed shooting and followed Viesturs up the mountain to aid the stranded climbers. The team ultimately decided to keep going, and summitted Everest on May 23, 1996. Viesturs was also featured in the Nova television documentary, Everest: The Death Zone (1998), in which he and Breashears climbed Everest to the summit, while undergoing physical and mental tests to record the effects of altitude on humans.

In July 2003, Viesturs and a Kazakh team, headed by Denis Urubko, were instrumental in the rescue of French climber Jean-Christophe Lafaille from Broad Peak. Lafaille had developed high-altitude pulmonary edema and was unable to complete his descent. They coordinated a rescue attempt in the dark, and were able to get Lafaille safely off the mountain and helicoptered out for medical help.

In 2005, Viesturs became the first American, and 12th climber in history, to summit all 14 mountains over 8,000 meters (collectively known as the eight-thousanders). He is the 5th climber in history to do it without using supplemental oxygen. Viesturs has summitted Mount Everest seven times. Research published in 2022 estimated that Viesturs was one of only three climbers in history to have stood on the "true" geographical summit of all the eight-thousanders and that Viesturs was the first to do so.

Viesturs' more recent climbs have included Broad Peak (the world's 12th highest mountain) and Nanga Parbat (the world's ninth highest mountain) in 2003, Annapurna (the world's 10th highest mountain) in 2005, and Mount Everest (for the seventh time) in 2009. On July 8, 2009 he led an expedition to Mount Rainier as part of the United Way Climb for the Community effort. UCLA coach Jim Mora, Seahawks CEO Tod Leiweke, and NFL commissioner Roger Goodell took part in this charitable enterprise, summiting the 14,410 ft peak.

Viesturs led an expedition to Antarctica, in January 2011, to climb its highest peak, Vinson Massif. In May 2021, he summitted Mount Rainier for the 216th time. Viesturs now acts as a guide for RMI Expeditions.

== 2023 Guinness World Records reclassification ==
For nearly 37 years, Guinness World Records (GWR) recognized Reinhold Messner as the first person to climb all 14 of the world's mountains over 8,000 m; starting in June 1970 and concluding on 16 October 1986. Messner, however, never claimed the record; many top mountaineers have stated they do not chase such records, not only because that is not the purpose of their endeavors but also because of the unavoidable and natural imprecision in proving many of these records.

Nevertheless, on September 18, 2023, GWR stripped Messner of the record and awarded it to Viesturs. Messner stated: "I don't care if my name is in the Guinness World Records book. You can't take a record I never claimed away from me."

GWR based their reclassification of the record holder on the decade-long analysis of Eberhard Jurgalski. Jurgalski, dubbed a "mountaineering consultant" or "mountain chronicler" by the media, claimed to have used photographic and GPS records to estimate the true summits of all 14 peaks. He apparently cross-checked these findings with the summit-related claims (including photographic evidence) of the individuals who summited these peaks. Jurgalski's estimates concluded that Messner, through no fault of his own, did not reach the true summit of at least three of the 14 peaks but that Viesturs was the first to do so. The difference in the claimed "true summit" and the "summit" supposedly reached by Messner was as little as a few meters.

Both Messner and Viesturs dispute Jurgalski's estimates, and other mountaineers have contested his findings as well. Jurgalski has never climbed any of the peaks in question and his claimed expertise, methodologies, and findings have been criticized by the mountain climbing community. For example: mountains change over time, especially via the collapse of summit cornices, which could explain the differences in the summit reached 40 years ago and the ones measured today. Moreover, Jurgalski may have missed cultural nuances that only expert climbers were aware of prior to summiting a mountain climbed by very few. For instance, Viesturs honored locals' requests not to stand on the true summit of one of the 14 peaks, stopping just short out of respect for their beliefs, which would technically mean he never summited all 14 peaks either even though he could have.

On October 13, 2023, Jurgalski reversed key features of his findings, stating that true summit of some of the peaks is indeterminable and therefore a "summit zone" of up to ~200 meters is a more appropriate approximation of wherein the true summit may lie. As a consequence, Jurgalski stated that Messner is the true record holder "forever".

Ultimately, in response to Jurgalski and GWR, Viesturs stated: "I truly believe that Reinhold Messner was the first person to climb all fourteen 8000ers and should still be recognized as having done so" and "Messner is still the record-holder."

Despite Jurgalski's retraction, Viesturs's voluntary failure to reach one of the summits out of respect for local culture, and Viesturs's proclamations that Messner is the true record holder, GWR maintains that Viesturs is the actual record holder.

== Other work ==
Viesturs was a cinematographer for the film Trio for One (2003), which told the story of French alpinist Jean-Christophe Lafaille's mission to climb Dhaulagiri, Nanga Parbat, and Broad Peak in a period of two months. He acts as a design consultant for manufacturers of outdoor equipment, and is a representative of his adopted hometown's football team, the Seattle Seahawks. He is a member of the board of directors for Big City Mountaineers, an urban youth organization that offers wilderness experiences. Viesturs has also found a niche as a corporate motivational speaker.

Viesturs lives in Ketchum, Idaho with his wife, Paula.

== Awards ==
Viesturs is a recipient of the David A. Sowles Memorial Award (1992) from the American Alpine Club. He is also the recipient of the Explorers Club Lowell Thomas Award (2001) He was named National Geographic's Adventurer of the Year (2005).

== Media ==
=== Books ===
- Peter Potterfield wrote Himalayan Quest: Ed Viesturs on the 8,000-Meter Giants (February 2003), chronicling Viesturs' climbing career to that point. Viesturs contributed photographs for the book and David Breashears wrote the introduction.
- Viesturs has published his autobiography, No Shortcuts to the Top: Climbing the World's 14 Highest Peaks (October 2006), documenting his 16-year journey summitting all 14 eight-thousanders, and his strategies to manage risk in extreme mountain environments.
- Viesturs and David Roberts published the book K2: Life and Death on the World's Most Dangerous Mountain, (October 2009) which tells the story of six expeditions to the world's second tallest mountain.
- Viesturs published The Will to Climb: Obsession and Commitment and the Quest to Climb Annapurna--the World's Deadliest Peak (October 2011), which he describes his own experiences on Annapurna as well as those of others who have attempted to climb the most dangerous (statistically) 8000 meter peak.
- Viesturs and David Roberts published The Mountain: Epic Adventures on Everest (October 8, 2013), which both surveys Viesturs' personal ascents and recounts other historical ascents of Mount Everest.

=== Films ===
- He was a featured climber in David Breashears' Everest IMAX film in 1998.
- He made a cameo appearance as himself in the film Vertical Limit (2000).
- He was portrayed by Clive Standen in the 2015 adventure film Everest.

=== Games ===
- Viesturs featured in a.k.a. studios' Everest (1999) published by GT Interactive.
- Viesturs and some of his footage of Mount Everest are featured in Big Fish Games' game Hidden Expedition: Everest (2007). It achieved first runner-up for Best Hidden Object Game of 2007.

=== Periodicals ===
- He was featured on the cover of Outside Magazine's 30th anniversary issue in 2007.

=== Television ===
- He was a guest on The Daily Show on December 7, 2006.
- He was a guest on Charlie Rose on January 16, 2007.
- He appeared on The Colbert Report on March 14, 2007, where he agreed to plant a Colbert Report flag atop Mount Everest the next time he went; on July 2, 2009, he brought the Colbert Nation flag back from Everest's summit to the show.

== See also ==
- List of Mount Everest summiters by number of times to the summit
- List of 20th-century summiters of Mount Everest
