= Rob Hall =

New Zealand mountaineer (1961–1996)

Rob Hall NZBS MBE
- Born: Robert Edwin Hall; 14 January 1961; Christchurch, New Zealand
- Died: 11 May 1996 (aged 35); Mount Everest, Nepal
- Cause of death: Hypothermia
- Resting place: South Summit of Everest
- Occupation: Mountain guide
- Employer: Adventure Consultants
- Known for: 1996 Everest disaster
- Spouse: Jan Arnold
- Children: 1

Robert Edwin Hall (14 January 1961 – 11 May 1996) was a New Zealand mountaineer. He was the head guide of a 1996 Mount Everest expedition during which he, a fellow guide, and two clients died. A best-selling account of the expedition was given in Jon Krakauer's book Into Thin Air and the expedition was dramatised in the 2015 film Everest. At the time of his death, Hall had just completed his fifth ascent to the summit of Everest, more at that time than any other non-Sherpa mountaineer.

Hall met his future wife, physician Jan Arnold, during his Everest summit attempt in 1990. Hall and Arnold climbed Denali for their first date and later married. In 1993, Hall and Arnold climbed to the summit of Everest together. In the catastrophic 1996 season, Arnold would have accompanied Hall on his Everest expedition, but she was pregnant.

== Mountaineering ==
Hall grew up in New Zealand where he climbed extensively in the Southern Alps. In 1989, he met Gary Ball, who became his climbing partner and close friend. Together they climbed the Seven Summits, including ascents of all seven in seven months. Eventually they quit professional climbing and formed a high-altitude guiding business, Hall and Ball Adventure Consultants. In 1992, they guided six clients to the top of Everest.

In October 1993, Ball died of pulmonary edema on Dhaulagiri, the world's seventh-highest mountain. Hall continued to run Adventure Consultants on his own. By 1996, he had guided thirty-nine climbers to the top of Everest. Although the price of a guided summit attempt – US$65,000 – was considerably higher than that of other expeditions, Hall's reputation for reliability and safety attracted clients from all over the world.

In the 1994 Queen's Birthday Honours, Hall was appointed a Member of the Order of the British Empire, for services to mountaineering.

== 1996 Everest disaster ==
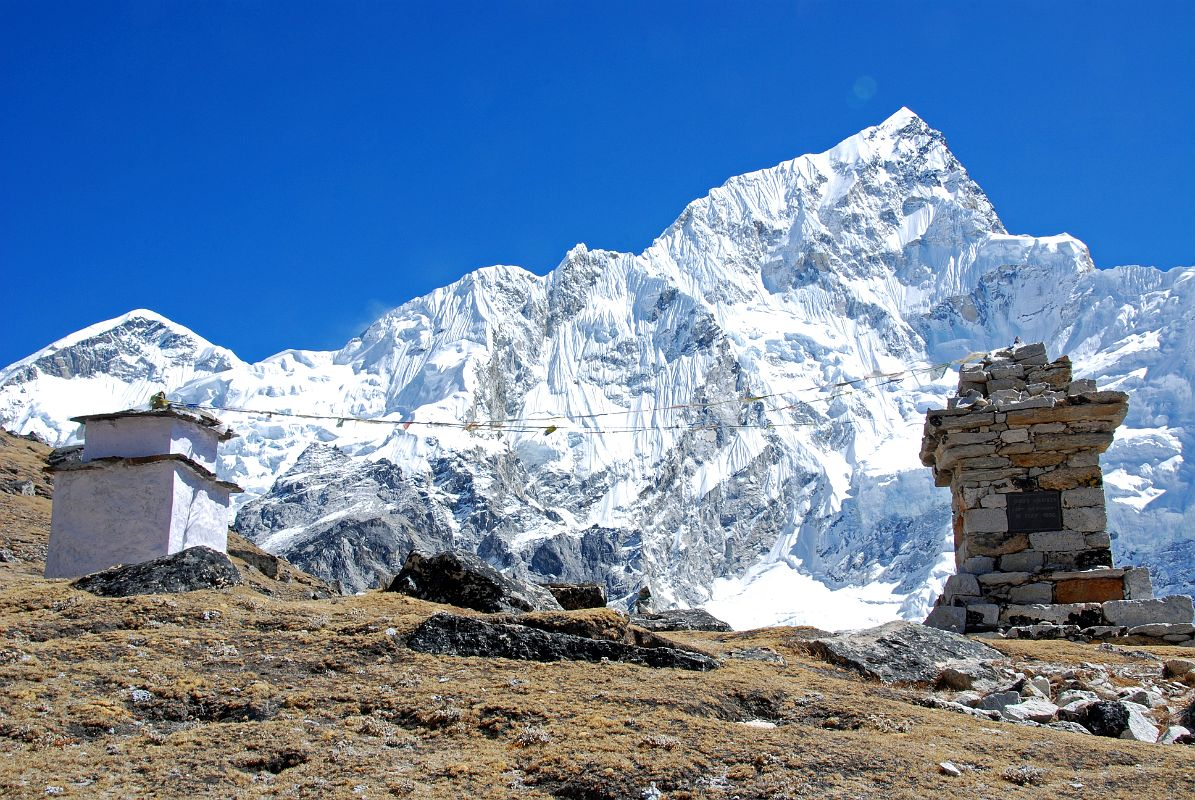
The Memorial Chorten for Rob Hall, Doug Hansen, Andy Harris, Yasuko Namba

Adventure Consultants' 1996 Everest expedition consisted of eight clients and three guides (Hall, Mike Groom, and Andy Harris). Among the clients was Jon Krakauer, a journalist on assignment from Outside magazine. Hall had brokered a deal with Outside; he would guide one of their writers to the summit in exchange for advertising space and a story about the growing popularity of commercial expeditions to Everest.

Shortly after midnight on 10 May 1996, the Adventure Consultants expedition began a summit attempt from Camp IV, atop the South Col. They were joined by climbers from Scott Fischer's Mountain Madness company, as well as expeditions sponsored by the governments of Taiwan and India.

The expeditions quickly encountered delays. Upon reaching the Hillary Step, the climbers discovered that no fixed line had been placed, and they were forced to wait for an hour while the guides installed the ropes. Since some 33 climbers were attempting to reach the summit on the same day, and Hall and Fischer had asked their climbers to stay within 150 m of each other, there were bottlenecks at the single fixed line at the Hillary Step. Many of the climbers had not yet reached the summit by 2:00 pm, the last safe time to turn around to reach Camp IV before nightfall.

Hall's Sardar, Ang Dorje Sherpa, and other climbing Sherpas waited at the summit for the clients. Near 3:00 pm, they began their descent. On the way down, Ang Dorje encountered client Doug Hansen above the Hillary Step, and ordered him to descend. Hansen shook his head, pointed to the summit and continued onward. When Hall arrived at the scene, he sent the Sherpas down to assist the other clients, and stated that he would remain to help Hansen, who had run out of supplementary oxygen.

At 4:30 p.m. and then again at 4:41 p.m., base camp received radio calls from Hall stating that Hansen had used all of his oxygen and could not descend the Hillary Step without fresh supplies. Interviews with Adventure Consultants personnel afterward revealed that Hall characterized Hansen's condition as "weak" and "incapacitated," that they perceived the situation as "very serious" and that Adventure Consultants guide Guy Cotter advised Hall to abandon Hansen and "save himself." Expedition records show that nothing more was heard from Hall that night.

At 4:45 a.m. on 11 May, Hall radioed base camp, indicated that Harris had reached him in the night, but had since disappeared, and that "Doug [Hansen] is gone." Hall was not breathing bottled oxygen, because his regulator was too choked with ice. By 9:00 am, Hall had fixed his oxygen mask, but indicated that his frostbitten hands and feet were making it difficult to traverse the fixed ropes. Later in the afternoon, he radioed to Base Camp, asking them to call his wife, Jan Arnold, on the satellite phone. During this last communication, he reassured her that he was reasonably comfortable and told her, "Sleep well my sweetheart. Please don't worry too much." He died shortly thereafter. His body was found on 23 May by mountaineers from the IMAX expedition, and still remains just below the South Summit. In the 1999 New Zealand bravery awards, Hall was posthumously awarded the New Zealand Bravery Star for his actions.

=== Media coverage ===
- Jon Krakauer published an article in Outside and a book called Into Thin Air shortly after the disaster. In both, he speculated that the delays caused by the missing fixed ropes, as well as the guides' decision not to enforce the 2:00 pm turnaround time, were responsible for the deaths. Krakauer was criticised by Hall's widow for publishing their last conversation. Hall's radio transmission from the summit ridge was patched through and connected to his wife at home. The transcription of Hall's final conversation with his wife was reprinted in the book.
- Into Thin Air: Death on Everest, a TV movie on the 1996 Everest disaster, starred Nathaniel Parker as Rob Hall.
- The series Seconds From Disaster published an episode about the 1996 incident called "Into The Death Zone". Rob Hall's ordeal is heavily covered in the episode.
- The Neil Finn song "The Climber" was inspired by Rob Hall's death.
- Another documentary directed by David Breashears, who was on Everest in 1996, "Storm Over Everest" aired on the PBS program Frontline in 2008.
- A feature film based on the events titled Everest (2015) was developed by Working Title Films and Universal Pictures, and directed by Baltasar Kormákur. Rob Hall is portrayed by Jason Clarke.
- Rob Hall is a character in the opera Everest (2015) by British composer Joby Talbot, which follows the major episodes of the 1996 Mount Everest disaster.
- The Anjan Dutt song "Mr. Hall" from the album Keu Gaan Gaye is based on Rob Hall's legacy.

== List of major climbs ==
- 1990 – Seven Summits (the Bass list: Aconcagua, Mount Everest, Elbrus, Kilimanjaro, Denali, Kosciuszko, Vinson)
- 1992 – K2 attempt (Scott Fischer, Ed Viesturs, and Charley Mace helped Hall save his climbing partner Gary Ball from edema)
- 1992 – Mount Everest
- 1993 – Dhaulagiri (reached 7300m with Gary Ball and Veikka Gustafsson. Veikka and Rob tried to rescue Gary, who got edema and later died on mountain.)
- 1993 – Mount Everest (with his wife, Jan Arnold)
- 1994 – Mount Everest
- 1994 – Lhotse
- 1994 – K2
- 1994 – Cho Oyu
- 1994 – Makalu
- 1995 – Cho Oyu
- 1996 – Mount Everest (died on descent)

== See also ==
- List of 20th-century summiters of Mount Everest
- List of people who died climbing Mount Everest
