= Into Thin Air: Death on Everest =

1997 television film directed by Robert Markowitz

- DVD cover
- Based on: Into Thin Air by Jon Krakauer
- Written by: Robert J. Avrech
- Directed by: Robert Markowitz
- Starring: Christopher MacDonald; Nathaniel Parker; Peter Horton; Richard Jenkins
- Narrated by: Christopher MacDonald
- Composer: Lee Holdridge
- Countries of origin: United States; Czech Republic
- Original language: English

Production
- Executive producer: Bernard Sofronski
- Producers: Hans Proppe; Rosalie Muskatt
- Production locations: Pitztal, Tyrol, Austria
- Cinematography: Neil Roach
- Editor: David Beatty
- Running time: 90 minutes
- Production companies: Stillking Films; Sofronski Productions; Columbia TriStar Television

Original release
- Network: ABC
- Release: November 9, 1997

Into Thin Air: Death on Everest is a 1997 disaster television film based on Jon Krakauer's memoir Into Thin Air (1997). The film, directed by Robert Markowitz and written by Robert J. Avrech, tells the story of the 1996 Mount Everest disaster. It was broadcast on ABC on November 9, 1997.

== Plot ==
Guides Rob Hall and Scott Fischer are leading two groups to Mount Everest's summit. The groups make their way through Camps 2, 3, and 4, and begin their ascent to the summit. In Camp 2, Fischer is forced to climb down with a sick client. Fischer refuses help and later returns tired.

Both groups reach the bottom of the Hillary step, where there are no fixed ropes. The Sherpa there states that it is a two-person job and the other Sherpa never arrived, due to being tired and ill from dragging climber Sandy Pittman (from Fischer's group) and her equipment up. Climbers Anatoli Boukreev and Neil Beidelman set the fixed ropes. By then dozens of climbers have reached the step, and congestion forms at the bottom. Climber Jon Krakauer (from Hall's group) continues to the summit with Boukreev. They are joined afterward by guide Andy Harris. Krakauer begins to descend and finds that the jam at the step has worsened. He is forced to wait.

While advancing with climber Doug Hansen, Hall misses his 2 p.m. turnaround time. When the step clears, Harris begins to descend. Krakauer begins to hallucinate from lack of oxygen, as Harris increased his oxygen flow when Krakauer asked for it to be decreased earlier during the climb. After making his way down to Harris, Krakauer realizes that something is wrong with Harris, who thinks that the full bottles at the oxygen drop are empty. After 3 p.m., most of the members of both groups reach the summit.

Krakauer continues his descent and runs into Fischer, who is exhausted and refuses to turn around. After 4 p.m., Hall and Hansen reach the summit. As the weather worsens, Krakauer finds Beck Weathers sitting alone in the snow. Weathers had eye surgery prior to the trip and lost his vision during the ascent. He declines leaving with Krakauer, having promised Hall that he would wait for the latter. At 4:30 p.m., after reaching the summit with Sherpa Lopsang, Fischer collapses. Krakauer reaches Camp 4 and goes to sleep. Beidelman, Mike Groom, and most of the clients stop to rest. They encounter Weathers, who agrees to descend with them. Storm clouds and snowfall cause the guides to become lost. Higher on the mountain, Hall and Hansen drag Fischer, who is too weak to stand.

Night falls, and Krakauer is awoken by Sherpa Ang Dorje, who says Hall and most of the clients have not returned. The pair searches for them, but eventually finds conditions too treacherous. Hall and Hansen continue descending. Fischer, suffering from edema, walks off the side of the mountain. Lopsang saves him by pulling him back up with the rope connecting them. Fischer begins to fall unconscious, and Lopsang radios for help.

Hall, struggling with the hallucinating Hansen, slips and falls. The two are separated, and Hall watches Hansen fall to his death. Harris finds Hall and tries to help him up before leaving to get help, despite Hall's pleas. Harris disappears from Hall's sight but cries out. Hall crawls over to find Harris's hat lying next to a drop and assumes the latter fell to his death. Buried under snow, Hall gets directions from Krakauer to an oxygen supply, but falls down. He does not see the oxygen bottles nearby.

Beidelman and Groom's group becomes lost. The guides take only the clients who can keep up with them, leaving behind Namba, Weathers, Pittman, and Charlotte Fox. Boukreev helps Fox and Pittman descend but cannot get a third client. Hall hallucinates about seeing his pregnant wife Jan (who is actually in New Zealand), then snaps outs of it. His hands and legs are frostbitten, and he has trouble moving. He blacks out again.

Awakening the next morning, Hall radios the camp and speaks with Jan. The couple decides to name their daughter Sarah. Hall says goodbye to his wife and dies from hypothermia. Weathers awakes, having survived being buried under snow without oxygen. Still blinded, he returns to camp and receives help. Boukreev climbs up and finds Fischer's frozen body. After covering Fischer's face, he leaves. Back at base camp, the survivors reminisce about the friends they lost.

== Reviews ==
Reviews of the film were generally positive. New York Times critic Caryn James said, “this straightforward film functions at a primitive but effective level” and that the film is “more absorbing than two hours' worth of ice, wind and hokey dialogue ought to be.” Eric Mink, a critic for the New York Daily News, called it “one of the most unusual and compelling TV movies of recent seasons.” USA Today’s Matt Roush praised the dramatic plot of the film but said the voiceovers were not as powerful as they were in Krakauer's book.

In The San Diego Union Tribune, critic Preston Turegano faulted the movie for failing to explore the characters' motivations, but said the film “realistically portrays the blurry vision, intense headaches, convulsions, coughing, labored breathing, windburn, stress, delirium, disorientation and frostbite of high altitude.” Turegano said, “The last 30 minutes of the tragic trek are anxiety-ridden and emotional.”

Deseret News critic Scott D. Pierce called the film “gripping,” praising its realism. “You almost feel like you're there on Everest with those climbers whether you're really that adventurous or not.”

== Cast ==
- Peter Horton as Scott Fischer
- Nathaniel Parker as Rob Hall (as Nat Parker)
- Richard Jenkins as Beck Weathers
- Christopher McDonald as Jon Krakauer
- Tim Dutton as Andy Harris
- Pamela Gein as Sandy Hill Pittman
- Peter J. Lucas as Anatoli Boukreev
- Long Nguyen as Ang Dorj
- Jeff Perry as Doug Hansen
- Ned Vaughn as Neal Beidleman
- Akemi Otani as Yasuko Namba
- Richard Rees as Lopsang
- Stuart Milligan as Dale Kruse
- Nicholas Hewetson as Tim Madsen
- Luke Garrett as Michael Groom
- Romilly Weeks as Charlotte Fox

== See also ==
- Everest, a 2015 film about the disaster
- List of media related to Mount Everest
