= Into Thin Air =

1997 nonfiction book by Jon Krakauer

Into Thin Air: A Personal Account of the Mt. Everest Disaster
- Hardcover edition
- Author: Jon Krakauer
- Cover artist: Randy Rackliff
- Language: English, Chinese, Japanese
- Subject: 1996 Mount Everest disaster
- Genre: Non-fiction
- Publisher: Villard Books
- Publication date: 1997
- Publication place: United States
- Pages: 416 pp. (Hardcover edition)
- ISBN: 978-0385494786
- OCLC: 42967338
- Preceded by: Into the Wild
- Followed by: Under the Banner of Heaven

Into Thin Air: A Personal Account of the Mt. Everest Disaster is a 1997 bestselling nonfiction book written by Jon Krakauer. It details Krakauer's experience in the 1996 Mount Everest disaster, in which eight climbers were killed and several others were stranded by a storm. Krakauer's expedition was led by guide Rob Hall. Other groups were trying to summit on the same day, including one led by Scott Fischer, whose guiding agency, Mountain Madness, was perceived as a competitor to Hall's agency, Adventure Consultants.

== Summary ==
Krakauer describes the events leading up to his eventual decision to participate in an Everest expedition in May 1996, despite having mostly given up mountain climbing years before. Krakauer was a journalist for the adventure magazine Outside, and initially his intention to climb Everest had been purely professional. He had planned to climb only as far as the mountain's base camp, and to report on the commercialization of the mountain. However, the idea of going to Everest reawakened his childhood desire to climb the mountain. Krakauer asked his editor to put off publishing the story for a year so that he could train for a climb to the summit.

From there, the book moves between describing events that took place on the mountain, and the unfolding tragedy, which occurs during the push to the summit. The 1996 disaster saw eight recorded deaths, including that of Krakauer's guide, Rob Hall. This is currently the third-highest recorded number of deaths on the mountain in a single day, with the 2015 Mount Everest avalanches causing the most at over 20. Krakauer concludes that essential safety methods that had been adopted over the years by experienced guides on Everest were sometimes compromised by the competition between rival guiding agencies to get their respective clients to the summit.

== Controversy ==
Krakauer's recounting of certain aspects of the climb generated criticism, both from some of the climb's participants and from fellow mountaineers such as photographer Galen Rowell. Much of the criticism centers on Krakauer's account of how Anatoli Boukreev, an experienced Kazakh high-altitude climber and guide for Scott Fischer, had handled the climb. Boukreev had descended the summit before his clients did, ostensibly out of concern for their safety, in order to prepare for potential rescue efforts.

Krakauer acknowledged that Boukreev's efforts after descending the mountain were heroic; Boukreev ventured out alone in a blizzard and rescued three climbers trapped on the mountain. He then climbed up the slopes of Everest to look for his employer and friend, Scott Fischer. However, Krakauer questioned Boukreev's judgment during the climb, in particular his decision to descend from the summit ahead of his clients, his decision not to use supplementary oxygen, his choices of gear on the mountain and his interactions with clients. The author acknowledged Boukreev's explanation for his early descent, 'in preparedness of potential rescue,' but questioned how feasible a coordinated rescue would have been without radio-relay (since Boukreev was without a radio, when he returned to camp). Boukreev provided a rebuttal to several of these claims in his 1997 book, The Climb.

Mountain Madness guide Neal Beidleman, who was part of the team that day, later offered a mixed assessment: he credited Boukreev for his extraordinary strength and life-saving rescue efforts in the storm, but maintained that Boukreev had been instructed to use supplemental oxygen and "failed to appreciate" the responsibilities of a commercial guide. Beidleman said Boukreev handed him his unused oxygen bottle at the Balcony, a decision he viewed as rooted partly in Boukreev's climbing philosophy and partly in a misunderstanding of his guiding role.

Rowell criticized Krakauer's account, citing numerous inconsistencies in his narrative, and observed that Krakauer had been asleep in his tent while Boukreev was rescuing other climbers. Rowell argued that not only were Boukreev's actions heroic but his judgment was also prescient: “[Boukreev] foresaw problems with clients nearing camp, noted five other guides on the peak [Everest], and positioned himself to be rested and hydrated enough to respond to an emergency. His heroism was not a fluke."

Mountaineer Graham Ratcliffe criticized Krakauer's account for omitting to mention that the teams on Everest in May 1996 were receiving – and sharing – accurate daily weather forecasts from weather services in England and Denmark and knew about the impending storm.

In Krakauer's 1999 paperback edition of Into Thin Air, he addresses some of the criticisms in a detailed postscript.

== Adaptation ==
Film rights for Into Thin Air were purchased by Sony almost immediately after the book's publication. The book was adapted into the TV movie Into Thin Air: Death on Everest (1997), starring Peter Horton as Scott Fischer and Christopher McDonald as Krakauer. The book and the film both contain the same strong editorial viewpoint regarding the fundamental causes of the tragedy, although the film differs sharply from the book in details regarding responsibility.

The 2015 film Everest, by director Baltasar Kormákur, depicts the same events as the book, with actor Michael Kelly portraying Krakauer. According to Kormákur, it is not based on Krakauer's book.

== See also ==
- List of people who died climbing Mount Everest
- After the Wind, a 2014 book by Lou Kasischke
- The Climb, a 1997 book by Anatoli Boukreev
- Timeline of the 1996 Mount Everest disaster
- Touching my father's soul: a Sherpa's journey to the top of Everest, a 2001 book by Jamling Tenzing Norgay (member of the IMAX expedition)
