= David Breashears =

American mountaineer (1955–2024)

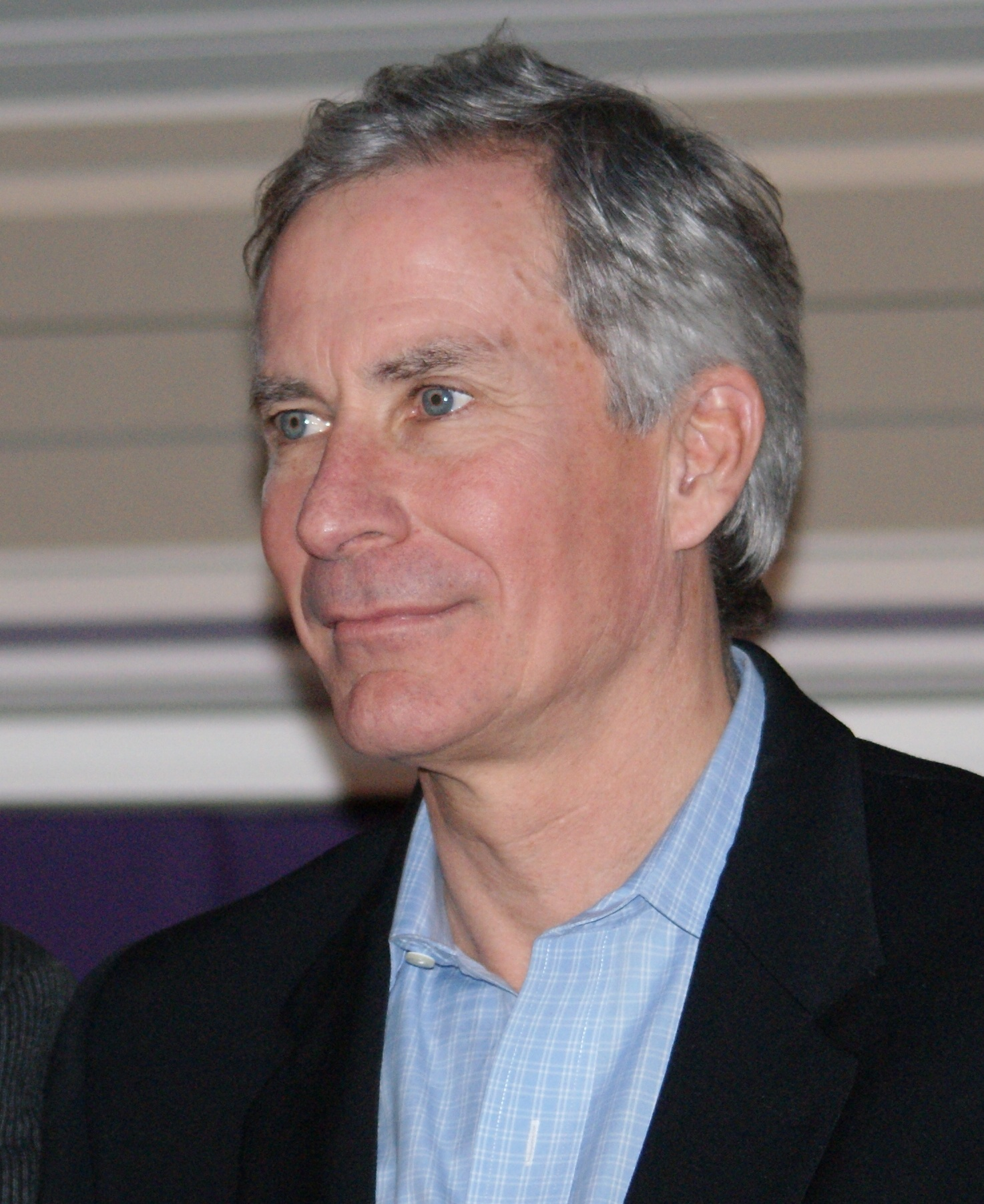
- Breashears in 2011
- Born: December 20, 1955; Fort Benning, Georgia, U.S.
- Died: March 14, 2024 (aged 68); Marblehead, Massachusetts, U.S.
- Occupations: Mountaineer; filmmaker; author; motivational speaker
- Notable work: Everest

David Finlay Breashears (December 20, 1955 – March 14, 2024) was an American mountaineer, filmmaker, author and motivational speaker. In 1985, he reached the summit of Mount Everest a second time, becoming the first American to reach the summit of Mount Everest more than once.

He was the director and cinematographer of Everest (1998), which became the highest-grossing IMAX documentary at the time of its release. During the film's production, he assisted in rescue efforts during the 1996 Everest disaster.

== Early life ==
Breashears was born on December 20, 1955 in Fort Benning, Georgia, the son of a United States Army officer.

== Career ==
=== Mountaineering, filmmaking, and photography ===
In 1983, Breashears transmitted the first live pictures from the summit of Mount Everest, and in 1985, he became the first American to reach its summit more than once. Breashears made eight expeditions to Everest, reaching the summit five times.

Breashears also climbed to the summit of 24,494 ft (7,466 m) Ama Dablam in the Himalayas, and is known in climbing circles for having free-climbed some of the most technically challenging rock walls in Colorado as a young man. His first free ascent, and on-sight, of the largely unprotected traditional climbing route Perilous Journey 5.11b X on Eldorado Mountain in 1975, was one of the boldest ascents of the 1970s.

In 1985, Breashears guided Richard Bass to the summit of Everest; with this, Bass completed the first-ever ascent of the Seven Summits (the highest summit on each of the seven continents).

Breashears also worked on feature films including Cliffhanger (1993) and Seven Years in Tibet (1997), as well as David Lee Roth's "Just Like Paradise" music video and numerous documentaries, such as the award-winning TV documentary Red Flag over Tibet. He received four Emmy awards for achievement in cinematography.

Combining his interests and skills in climbing, filmmaking, and photography, he directed, starred in, and produced the acclaimed IMAX film Everest (1998), and contributed still photos to the best selling book Everest: Mountain Without Mercy (1997). He also produced the first live audio Webcast from Everest's summit for the Nova television program, Everest: The Death Zone (1998). Additionally, Breashears made the film Kilimanjaro: To the Roof of Africa (2002).

Breashears' documentary film, Storm Over Everest (May 13, 2008), shown on PBS Frontline, features photography on the mountain, interviews with survivors of the three climbing teams that were caught in the 1996 storm, and music composed by Jocelyn Pook. During the filming of the documentary in 2006, Breashears summitted Everest a fifth time. He also documented his personal reactions to climbing Everest again, while filming the Nova documentary, in "Epilogue to the 1996 Everest disaster".

=== Publications ===
Breashears was the author of several books, including an autobiography, High Exposure: An Enduring Passion for Everest and Unforgiving Places (1999).

Breashears also wrote the article, "Every Man For Himself?", published in American Alpine Journal (1988).

=== Work with organizations ===
Breashears was a director of Destination Himalaya, a travel firm specializing in adventure travel to Himalayan countries.

In 2007, Breashears founded GlacierWorks, a non-profit company that uses science, art, and adventure to raise awareness about climate change in the Greater Himalaya.

== Personal life and death ==
Breashears was married to fellow adventurer Veronique Choa in 1986. They divorced in 1990. He had a son from another relationship. Breashears lived in Marblehead, Massachusetts when not climbing. He died at his home in Marblehead on March 14, 2024, at the age of 68.

== See also ==
- List of Mount Everest guides
- List of Mount Everest summiters by number of times to the summit
- List of 20th-century summiters of Mount Everest
- Timeline of the 1996 Mount Everest disaster
