= Doug Hansen (Everest) =

American amateur mountaineer (1949–1996)

- Born: Douglas J. Hansen; May 28, 1949; Aberdeen, South Dakota, U.S.
- Died: May 10, 1996 (aged 46); Mount Everest
- Cause of death: 1996 Mount Everest disaster
- Education: Renton High School
- Children: 2

Douglas J. Hansen (May 28, 1949 – May 10, 1996) was an amateur mountain climber who reached the summit of Mount Everest, but died during his descent, in the 1996 Mount Everest disaster.

== Biography ==
Hansen grew up in Aberdeen, South Dakota, with his two brothers and sister and moved with his family to Renton, Washington, as a teenager. He climbed Mount Rainier in his youth, graduated from Renton High School in 1967 and subsequently went to work for the United States Postal Service in Kent. He married, had a son and daughter and ultimately divorced, after which he turned his energies toward marathon running and climbing in the European Alps. In 1993 he unsuccessfully attempted to ascend Shishapangma as a paying client of Eric Simonson's International Mountain Guides. In 1995 he aborted a summit attempt on Mount Everest as a paying client of Rob Hall's Adventure Consultants. He returned to Everest in 1996 as Hall's client for a second attempt at summiting the mountain.

== 1996 expedition ==
On March 31, 1996, Hansen arrived at Kathmandu to join the Adventure Consultants Friendship Everest Expedition 1996. From there the group travelled by helicopter to Lukla where they hiked to Everest base camp, reaching it on April 9. One climber stated Hansen raised the issue of the number of permits being accepted by the Nepalese government that first night. He subsequently communicated extensively via fax with his children from base camp. A journalist climbing with the expedition said that toward the end of April Hansen told him he had undergone minor throat surgery earlier in the year, was experiencing the after effects of frostbite from his previous summit attempt and was "feeling like shit." Another climber reported that on May 8 Hansen thought the next day's planned summit bid was "a bad idea."

=== Summit Bid ===
On May 9 at 11:30 p.m. local time the group - followed shortly thereafter by several other expeditions - headed for the summit. A climber from another expedition called them "old" and "slow." In the early hours of May 10 two team members aborted their climb and Hansen reportedly told another climber that "he was cold and was going back." But he continued with his ascent and it has been speculated that expedition leader Hall convinced him not to turn back. As one climber stated:

Five out of eight Hall expedition climbers had by then, at noon, made judgments independent of the leadership not to continue for the top. They were able to say no when they had to. These were the individual decisions Rob [Hall] said he expected us to make. They stuck to the turnaround time, as promised. That left the leaders and three Hall climbers - Namba, Hansen, and Krakauer—still on the long march into the nightmare.

Madeline David, the office manager for Adventure Consultants, subsequently reported "late summit on an increasingly windy day" and "at 2:30 p.m. Rob was still on summit waiting for a tired Doug." An eyewitness at this point in the climb characterized Hansen as "clearly in trouble." Guide Ang Dorje Sherpa encountered him above the Hillary Step at around 3:00 p.m. and ordered him to descend, but Hansen shook his head and pointed upward toward the summit. A photograph was taken by a guide from another expedition at about 3:20 p.m. showing Hansen about 130 feet past the Hillary Step clipped to a fixed rope and with an unraveled lace strung out from his left boot. Guide Michael Groom recalled looking back to the Hillary Step and seeing "Rob Hall standing up and Doug Hansen leaning into the slope resting on his ice axe," giving Hansen a thumbs up and Hansen giving him a thumbs up in return." Hansen reached the top of Everest at around 4:30 p.m., the last to summit that day. A guide from another expedition said that he was accompanied by Hall, who came down from the summit to escort him up the final stretch.

=== Descent ===
At around 5:30 p.m. base camp received radio calls from Hall stating that Hansen had depleted his oxygen and could not descend the Hillary Step without fresh supplies. Interviews with Adventure Consultants personnel afterward revealed that Hall characterized Hansen's condition as "weak" and "incapacitated" and the situation as "very serious." Hall was encouraged to abandon Hansen by guide Guy Cotter and "save himself," explained as an attempt to give Hall "the option to...decide that what I was saying was a good idea and he might have been thinking it in his own head but yet not being able to come up with that decision himself." A doctor present said this advice was given by climbers Todd Burleson and Pete Athans as well. Adventure Consultants employee Helen Wilton later stated that Hall "sounded a little annoyed" as he replied "we're both listening."

The expedition records show that at around 5:45 p.m. Hall indicated he was attempting to bring Hansen down the Hillary Step, but Wilton later qualified that entry saying she "recorded at that time that it sounded like Rob wasn't leaving Doug and...we didn't hear for another twelve hours from Rob." It thus remains unknown what actually ensued between Hall and Hansen that evening and the early morning hours of the next day.

=== Death ===
At 4:45 a.m. on May 11 Hall radioed base camp, indicated that guide Andy Harris had reached him in the night but had since disappeared and in response to queries about Hansen replied "Doug is gone." Hall died that night without further elaboration and this ambiguous statement has been subject to multiple interpretations. Cotter reported contemporaneously as follows:

Last to descend were Rob Hall and Doug Hansen who were caught by nightfall above the South Summit and consequently ran out of bottled oxygen. Hansen died during the night and Hall was forced to bivouac in the open at 8750m, without tent or sleeping bag.

Adventure Consultants guide Michael Groom reported - without actual direct knowledge - that Hansen died between the Hillary Step and the South Summit, "probably...early the night of the 10th." The expedition's official necropsy findings list Hansen's cause of death as "exposure."

=== Recovery ===
Hansen's body was initially reported "at base of Step very near Hall at summit of snow cave Hall is in," but as it is not possible for a single person to get a prone climber down the Hillary Step this appears to have been based upon a narrative being formulated by Cotter. Mountaineers David Breashears and Ed Viesturs reached Hall's body at the South Summit on May 23, found evidence that Harris had been there but no indication that Hansen had. Hansen probably died where he foundered - just above the Hillary Step. His body has never been found and is most likely to have fallen down the Kangshung Face into Tibet sometime between May 10–23.

== Aftermath ==
In the immediate aftermath of the disaster there appeared to be an effort by Adventure Consultants to obfuscate the specific circumstances of Hansen's death. Cotter significantly misreported his summit time and David misreported the time of Hall's first distress call. These actions both had the effect of concealing how late in the day Hansen's summit actually was, which Breashears clarified in 2008. Cotter also claimed to have heard otherwise undocumented radio transmissions from Hall the night of May 10, and persons unknown spread the false story of the discovery of Hansen's ice axe on May 23. This implied that Hall had succeeded in getting Hansen down from the top of the Hillary Step. A journalist Jon Krakauer embedded with Adventure Consultants subsequently wrote a bestseller book Into Thin Air that codified some of these falsities and established a narrative regarding the disastrous expedition.

One climber who turned around later asked "[w]as Rob [Hall] a hero...for staying with Doug and trying to help him down...[or was he] just trying to put out a fire he'd started?" It has been theorized that an oxygen cache stored by Adventure Consultants on the South Summit was stolen by another expedition, discovered and reported by guide Andy Harris and subsequently ignored by Adventure Consultants, although there is no evidence for this claim except for an account of Michael Tracy, who was not present in 1996. The subsequent narrative may thus have been crafted in an attempt to shield the company from wrongful death liability, which has to be regarded as mere speculation. Furthermore, the relevance of this theory is questioned due to the large number of Adventure Consultants clients known to have turned back prior to reaching the South Summit and the relatively small size of the alleged pilfering expedition. Jon Krakauer, the journalist reporting on the 1996 tragedy in his book Into Thin Air, subsequently refuted several of Tracy's claims in a series of eight blog posts.

Hansen was survived by his father and two adult children, who received his personal effects on May 19. A small memorial was subsequently placed in a rock garden on the property of the United States Post Office in Kent. The plaque reads: "Don't give up on your dreams. In memory of coworker Douglas Hansen who died May 10, 1996 descending the summit of Mt. Everest. - May 1997."

The disaster has been featured prominently in media. A 1997 television movie Into Thin Air: Death on Everest featured Jeff Perry as Hansen. He was portrayed by John Hawkes in the 2015 film Everest.

== See also ==
- 1996 Mount Everest disaster
- Adventure Consultants
- Rob Hall
- List of people who died climbing Mount Everest
