= Timeline of the 1996 Mount Everest disaster =

The climb began at the Everest base camp, proceeded upward through the Khumbu icefall, the Western Cwm, the Lhotse face, and the South Col.

Timeline of the 1996 Mount Everest disaster details the sequence of events leading up to the deaths of five climbers on the South Col route to the summit of Mount Everest on 10–11 May 1996. The climbers all died during a blizzard while descending from the summit. Three more climbers died on the North Face route in the blizzard.

Mount Everest, elevation 8,849 m (29,032 ft), is the highest mountain in the world. First summited in 1953, by 1996 attempts to summit Everest had become increasingly common both by experienced mountain climbers and amateurs with enough money to pay for guides and Sherpas to support them in their quest. Climbing Everest is dangerous. The lack of oxygen in the sparse air at the elevations on its slopes can cause high-altitude pulmonary edema (HAPE) and high-altitude cerebral edema (HACE), both life-threatening. Frostbite, hypothermia, avalanches, and accidents are common dangers. Oxygen deprivation at high altitudes can cause mental confusion as well as extreme exhaustion. Supplemental oxygen is used by most climbers. In 1996, medical evacuation by helicopter had never been done above elevations of about 5,300 m (17,400 ft).

Scott Fischer, the American owner of Mountain Madness, was an experienced mountain climber, but 1996 was his first year as an expedition leader and guide on Everest. He signed up eight clients for the attempt to summit Everest. American Sandy Hill Pittman reported from the mountain by satellite phone to NBC News. Lene Gammelgaard, a Dane, also reported to the media from the mountain but her reports from the field were handwritten and left Everest on foot and by helicopter as did mail from other expedition members. Fischer's lead guide was Anatoli Boukreev from Kazakhstan, one of the most experierenced mountaineers in the world. Boukreev climbed without the use of supplemental oxygen, a controversial practice for guides.

Rob Hall, from New Zealand, the owner of Adventure Consultants, also had eight clients for the Everest climb. It was his seventh year in operation and he had guided 39 climbers to the summit of Everest without a fatality, but his attempt with clients in 1995 had been a failure. With Hall was American Jon Krakauer who was supported by Outside magazine. Krakauer's assignment was to write an article for the magazine about the commercialization of Everest.

Among several other climbing groups on the mountain, David Breashears headed a team of experienced mountain climbers to make an IMAX film about climbing Everest. 1996 was the busiest year yet on Everest and, with the presence of several journalists among the climbers, the expedition leaders had a business incentive to ensure climbing success.

Hall's and Fischer's plan for their clients to summit Everest on 10 May was to leave Camp IV on the South Col at midnight, reach the summit of Everest about 12:00 p.m. and descend, reaching Camp IV at about 6 p.m. The time required for the planned round trip was eighteen hours. Hall established a turn-around time of 2:00 p.m. (some sources say 1 p.m) at which time all climbers, wherever they were on the mountain, were required to begin their return to Camp IV. Hall said that his decision to descend was "absolute law, beyond appeal." On the day of the tragedy, Hall did not enforce his "law." Fischer does not seem to have established a firm turn-around time. Thirty-three climbers departed the South Col (Camp IV) on 10 May to climb upward toward the Everest summit. Twenty two of them were Hall and Fischer, their guides, and their clients. The others were Sherpas working for the teams and the Taiwanese climber "Makalu" Gau Ming-ho.

Eight climbers died on Everest, five of them on the South Col route. Three members of the 1996 Indo-Tibetan Border Police expedition to Mount Everest died on the North Face route. The circumstances and the causes of the disaster on the South Col have been extensively documented and disputed. The climbers were attempting to descend from the summit of Everest during a blizzard in which the temperature had fallen and visibility was minimal. The descent was at night because they had not summited in time to reach camp and safety before darkness.

All times listed in this article are approximate.

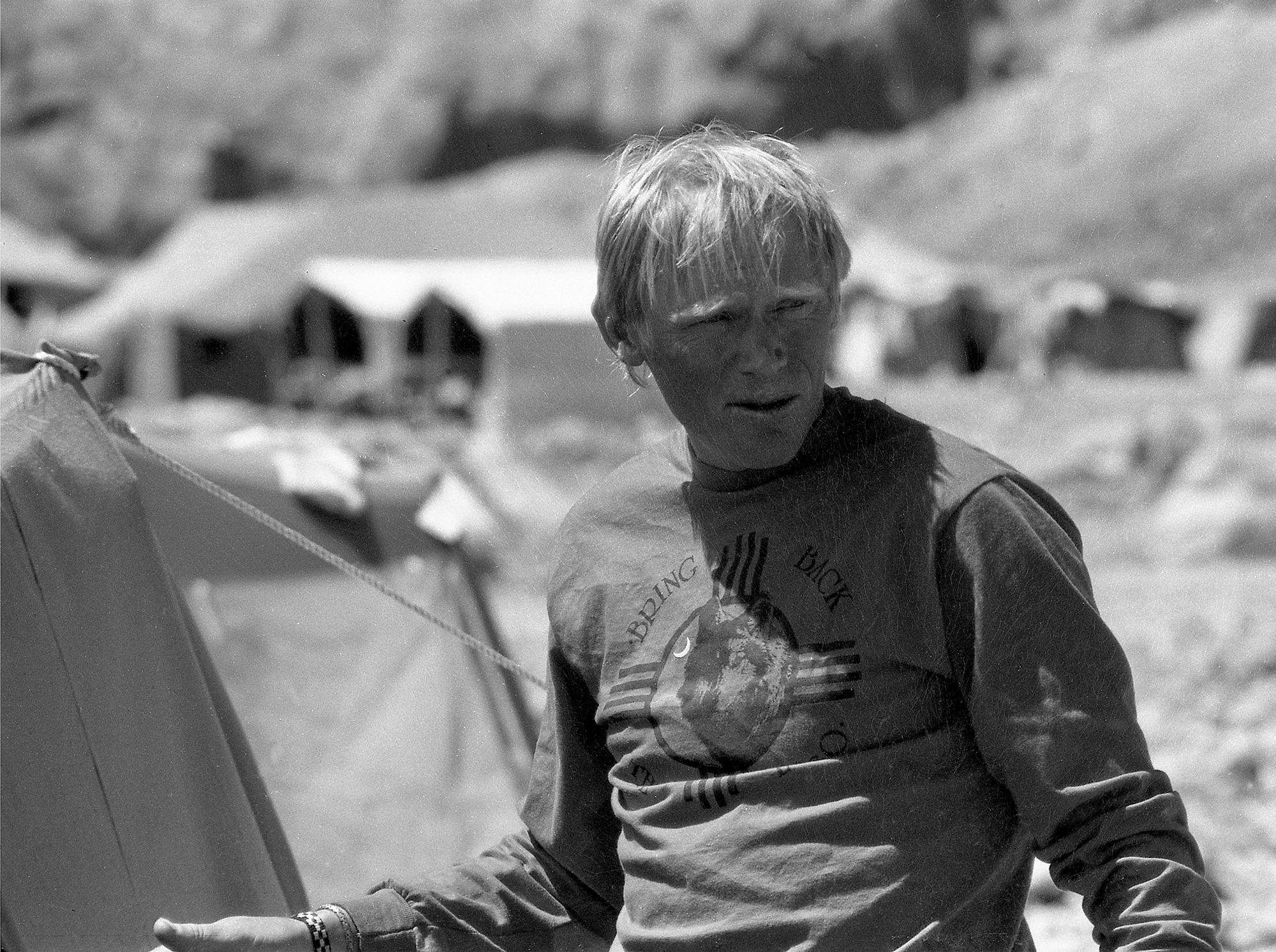
Anatoli Boukreev

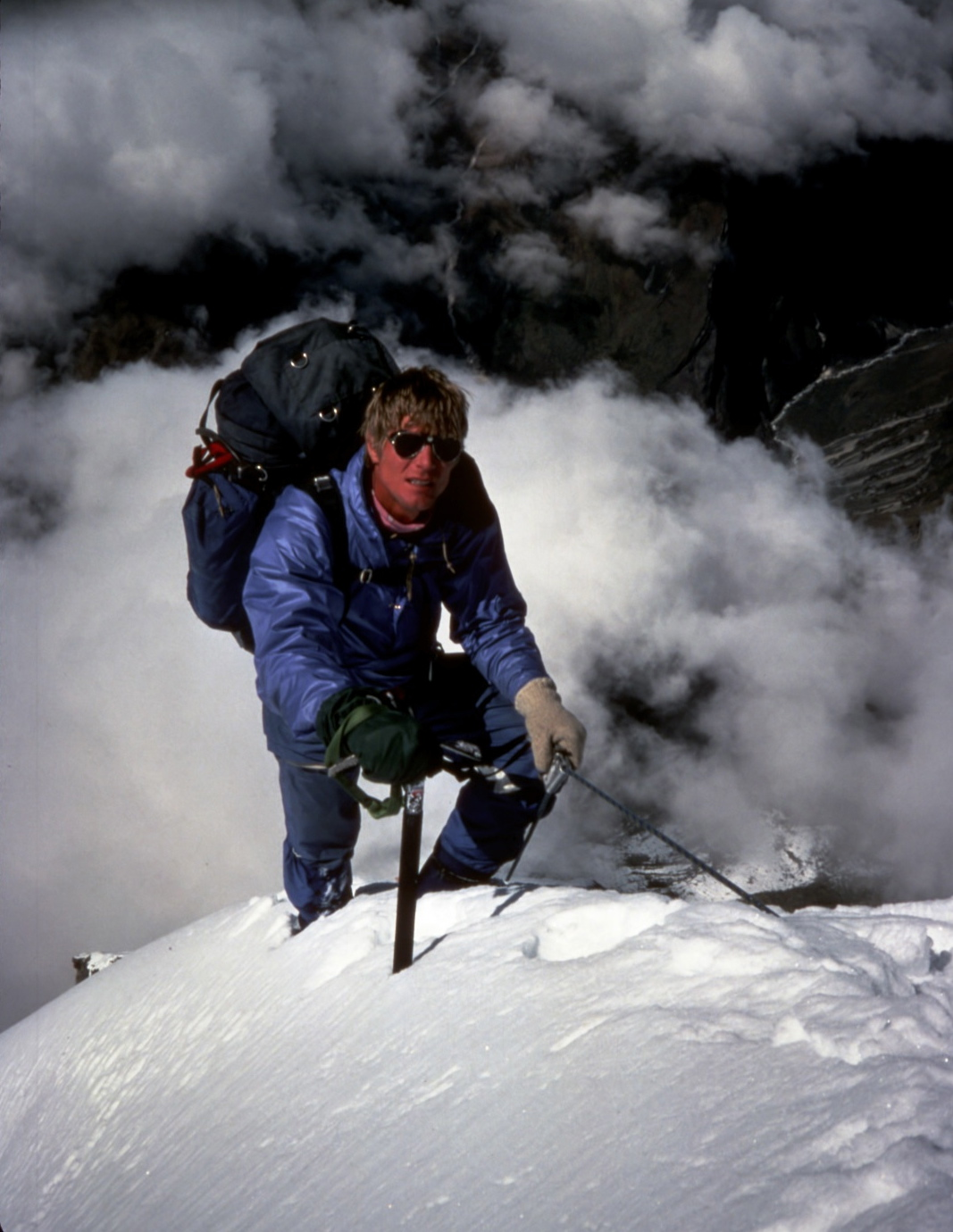
Scott Fischer

== The South Col route ==
The prominent locations via the South Col route, listed in ascending elevations, were: Everest Base Camp, Camps I, II, III, and IV (the South Col), The Balcony, the South Summit, the Hillary Step, and the summit of Everest.

== 15 March ==
Anatoli Boukreev arrived in Kathmandu, Nepal to advance Scott Fischer's Mountain Madness expedition to summit Everest. Boukreev had been hired by Fischer as the lead guide. In his first year of operation, Fischer had signed up eight clients for the climb.

== 21 March ==
Sandy Pittman, who had signed up to climb Everest with Scott Fischer, broadcast to NBC from Nepal. "I wouldn't dream of leaving town without an ample supply of Dean & Delucas Near East Blend and my expresso maker." The magazine Newsweek called Pittman's remark "altitude chicness." Vanity Fair called Pittman a "socialite climber," but Pittman had an impressive mountaineering record, including two previous attempts to summit Everest.

== 25 March ==
Anatoli Boukreev and Nguna Sherpa flew by helicopter from Kathmandu to Syangboche at an elevation of 3,780 m (12,400 ft) to begin preparations for the arrival of the clients.

== 29 March ==
Scott Fischer's clients flew from Kathmandu to Syangboche. They felt the breathlessness of the higher elevation. Acclimation to increasingly high elevations was part of the process of climbing Everest.

Journalist Jon Krakauer arrived in Kathmandu to join Rob Hall's Adventure Consultants expedition to summit Everest. Hall's well-established organization had been in operation for six years, but in 1995 his group had failed to summit Everest because of bad weather. For 1996, Hall had also signed up eight clients for the attempt to summit Everest. Krakauer assessed Hall's clients as "nice" people, but not 'hard-core climbers,"

== 30 March ==
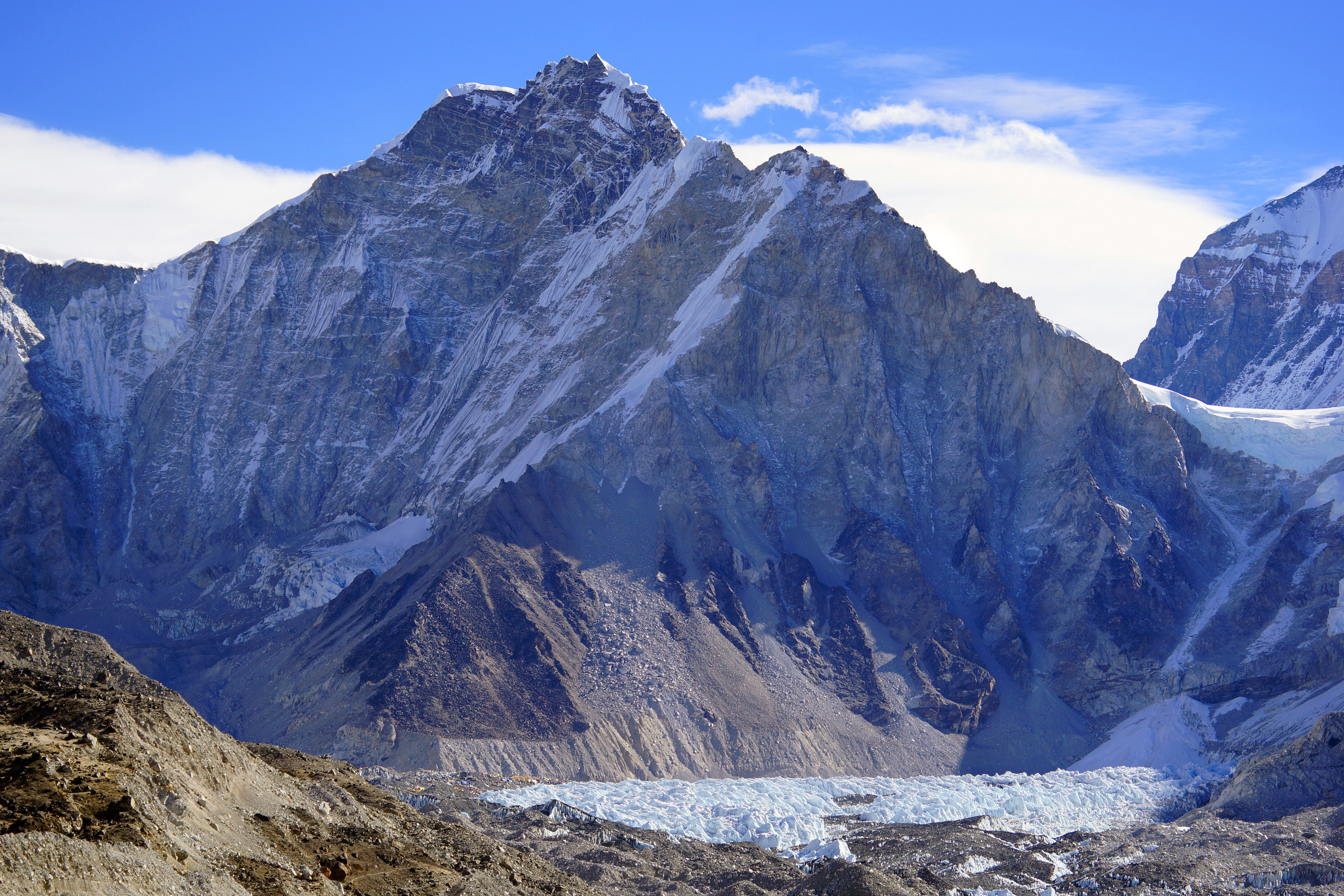
Everest, Khumbu Glacier, and the Base Camp (tents, lower left at edge of the glacier)

Boukreev arrived by foot at the Everest base camp, elevation 5,300 m (17,400 ft). Sherpas were already there preparing campsites.

== 31 March ==
Rob Hall, guide Andy Harris, and Adventure Consultants' clients helicoptered from Kathmandu to Lukla, 2,860 m (9,380 ft) in elevation.

== 7 April ==
Sherpas went up the mountain in advance of the clients to prepare the camps for the arrival of the clients. One of Hall's Sherpas fell into a crevasse while crossing the glacier uphill from the base camp. The rescue and evacuation of a climber injured at an elevation of 5,900 m (19,400 ft) was no small undertaking. Hall asked to borrow six Sherpas from David Breashears, the leader of the Everest IMAX Filming Expedition. Breashears insisted that Hall pay them for their work -- about six dollars per day each -- as it was their day off and they needed rest to recover from several days of carrying heavy loads of equipment. Hall objected to the expense, but relented and assembled a team of 25 Sherpas to rescue and transport the injured Sherpa to lower elevations where he was evacuated by helicopter. Time for rest, recuperation, and acclimation was essential for people attempting to climb Everest and this was the first of several incidents which would sap the strength of guides, clients, and Sherpas.

== 8 April ==
Scott Fischer's Mountain Madness clients and guides arrived on foot at the Everest base camp. Boukreev made the observation that the radios Fischer brought for the expedition were "antiquated" and "a joke". On Fischer's team only Fischer and Sherpa sardar (leader) Lopsang Jangbu Sherpa carried radios. This would inhibit communication among the guides.

== 9 April ==
Rob Hall's Adventure Consultants guides and clients arrived on foot at the Everest base camp. Eleven teams of climbers were at the base camp and more than 300 people were living there in tents. Rob Hall's Adventure Consultants, Scott Fischer's Mountain Madness, and David Breashears' Everest IMAX Filming Expedition were the three largest and most professional. The expeditions at the base camp all devised acclimatization plans which consisted of slow advances to higher elevations over a period of several weeks.

Sherpas and climbers participated in a Puja ritual to honor the mountain god and help ensure a safe and successful climb.

== 10 April ==
When returning from acclimatization hikes, climbers customarily left their personal equipment at the edge of the Khumbu Glacier ten minutes walk above the base camp. Several items were stolen, including the crampons, an individualistic item of equipment, of Hall and Breashears. They were able to replace the crampons. The theft was unprecedented and the identity of the thief was never discovered. The incident aroused suspicion among the climbing teams who took precautions to prevent threat of their equipment and locked their tents.

== 13 April ==
Krakauer made the observation that "none of us in Hall's group had a prayer of climbing Everest without considerable assistance from Hall, his guides, and the Sherpas."

== 16 April ==
Climbers approached Everest in stages. For example, on this day Hall's group left base camp and climbed up to Camp I, 6,100 m (20,000 ft). spent two nights there, then on 18 April climbed to Camp II, 6,500 m (21,300 ft) in elevation. On 21 April they returned to base camp to rest and prepare for another acclimatization hike.

== 22 April ==
One of Hall's Sherpas, Ngawang Topche, became ill from High Altitude Pulmonary Edema (HAPE) and had to be evacuated from base camp. He died a month later.

== 27 April ==
In an episode titled Mountain without Mercy of the television program, Turning Point, broadcast in the United States on this date, Mountain Madness guide and owner Scott Fischer said, "We are building a yellow brick road to the top of Everest." It was Fischer's first year of guiding clients on Everest.

== 1 May ==
The Danish climber Lene Gammelgaard wanted to attempt to climb Everest without supplemental oxygen. Fischer, who had initially been supportive, told her she had to use oxygen, saying that she had not been strong enough in the acclimatization climbs. She reluctantly agreed, but said that he had not observed her on the training climbs and that she had been slow because she was helping other climbers, especially Sandy Pittman.

== 6 May ==
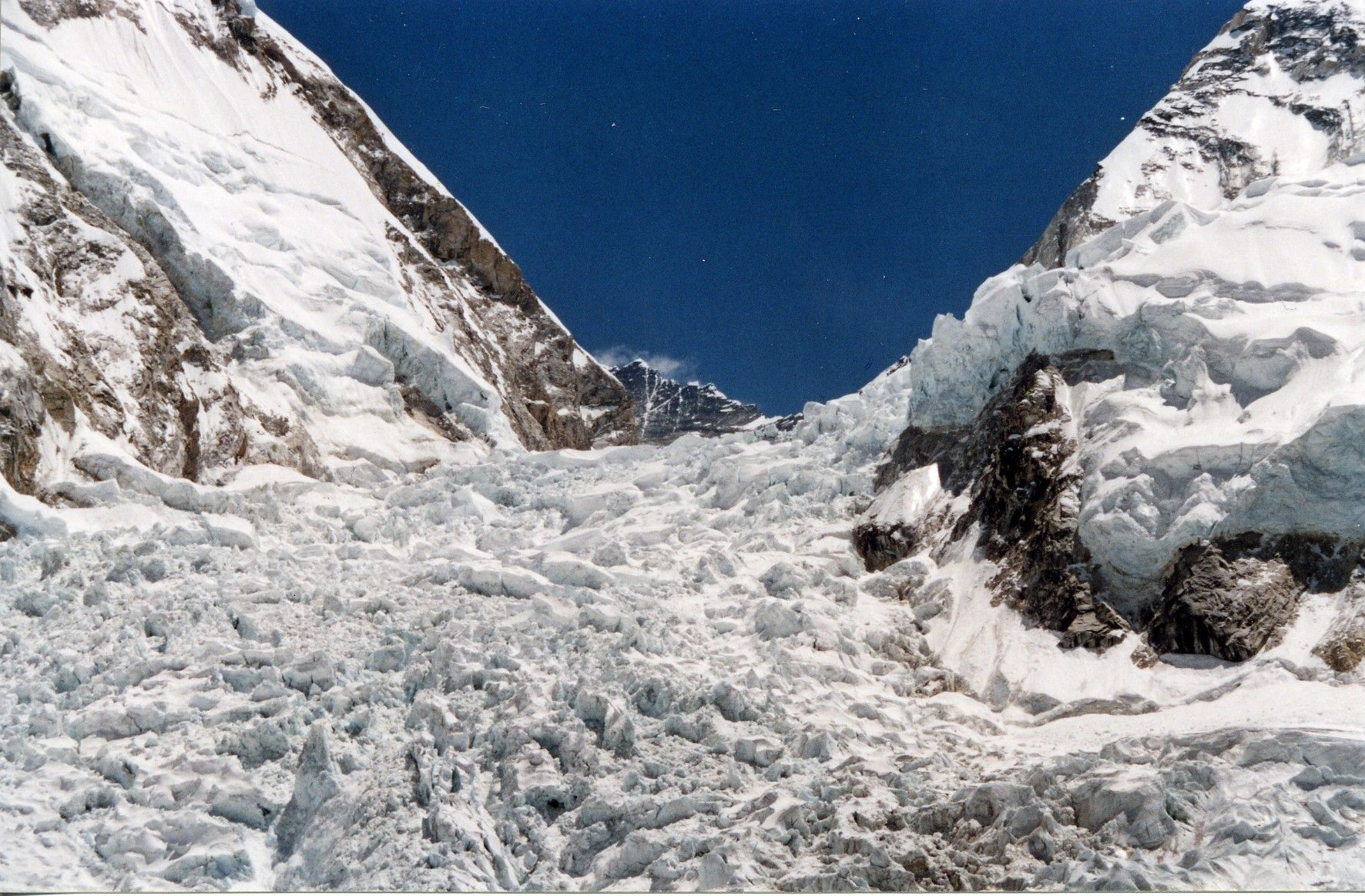
The Khumbu Icefall

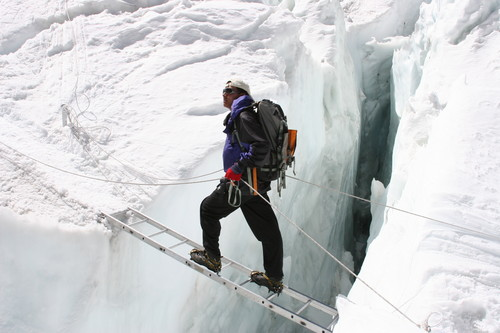
Crossing a crevasse on the Khumbu Icefall

The attempt on Everest began. After six weeks of acclimatization, Hall's and Fischer's clients left base camp and hiked upward over the Khumbu Icefall to Camp I, elevation 6,100 m (20,000 ft). Climbing along with them was a Taiwanese team headed by Makalu Gau. The Khumbu Icefall is one of the most dangerous sections of the route up Everest because of many deep crevasses and overhanging seracs and frequent avalanches from the bordering glaciers. Fixed ropes and ladders across crevasses and up seracs facilitated the passage of the climbers.

Hall had fixed on 10 May as the day to summit Everest and aimed for that date. IMAX team member, Ed Viesturs, commented "maybe he fixed his sights a little too rigidly on an arbitrary calendar date."

Dale Kruse, one of Fischer's clients, had HACE (High Altitude Cerebral Edema) and was in danger of dying. Fischer decided that he would escort Kruse, a good friend, down to Base Camp instead of delegating the duty to a Sherpa. En route to base Camp, Fischer encountered Boukreev climbing alone. He reprimanded Boukreev asking why he was not with the clients. The descent to Base Camp and the climb back up to Camp I exhausted Fischer.

Another Fischer client, a renowned mountaineer, Pete Schoening, 68 years old, decided that he would quit the climb and return to Base Camp.

== 7 May ==
After accompanying Kruse to base camp, Fischer returned to Camp I. Krakauer noticed that he looked anxious and extremely tired after the journey down the mountain and up again. Hall, Fischer, their clients, and the Taiwanese team hiked from Camp I to Camp II, elevation 6,500 m (21,300 ft).

== 8 May ==
Breashears and his IMAX team at Camp III saw below them a line of 55 people ascending "like a line of ants" from Camp II toward Camp III. Breashears made the opposite decision to descend because of poor weather for filming. He and his team moved down to Camp II to wait for the weather to improve. While descending Breashears met Hall and Fischer. Hall, he said, was very rigid, organized and in control; Fischer was a free spirit.

While traversing the steep and hazardous Lhotse Face, Hall's guide Andy Harris was hit in the chest by a falling boulder. He narrowly escaped being seriously injured.

Hall and Fischer and their clients reached Camp III at an elevation of 7,315 m (23,999 ft). With Fischer's permission, Sandy Pittman sent Lopsang, lead Sherpa for Fischer, up to Camp IV on the South Col carrying a satellite phone and equipment (which weighed about 30 pounds) so she could communicate with NBC news after arriving there. The extra exertion tired Lopsang. Boukreev commented, "Simply unbelievable!", a sentiment with which Gammelgaard concurred.

== 9 May ==
The climbers left Camp III to ascend to Camp IV at 7,926 m (26,004 ft) elevation on the South Col. They put on down suits and used bottled oxygen for the first time, each carrying for the climb one tank of oxygen, enough to last the six hours the stronger climbers needed to reach Camp IV. En route, one of Rob Hall's climbers, a male (unnamed), could only continue with Hall's assistance. Breashears commented that it took the climbers two days to walk from Camp II to Camp IV. By contrast, the Sherpas carrying heavy loads of supplies climbed from Camp II to Camp IV and back to Camp II in one day.

The South Col is a "flat featureless area...subject to high winds..." between Everest on one side and Lhotse on the other. The Col measures about 400 m (1,300 ft) by about 200 m (660 ft).

9:00 a.m. A Taiwanese climber named Chen Yu-Nan at Camp III fell 70 ft (21 m) down a crevasse just outside his tent. He initially did not seem seriously injured but his condition worsened quickly. A Sherpa tried to escort him down to the base camp for medical treatment but he died en route. Sherpas fear contact with the dead and the body was left hanging from a rope. Breashears, American Ed Viesturs, and Austrian Robert Schauer climbed up the mountain from Camp II to retrieve the body. Breashears was critical of Taiwanese climber, Makalu Gao, who continued his climb to Camp IV along with two Sherpas while he and his colleagues had to retrieve the body.

3:00 p.m. most of the climbers reached Camp IV. A few, however, did not arrive until about 6 p.m. They were now in the "Death Zone," the elevation from 26,000 feet upwards where the human body and mind begin to break down and survival beyond more than a day or two without supplemental oxygen is unlikely. A fierce gale was blowing and ice formed on the inside walls of their tents as the climbers rested for their attempt on the summit. According to Boukreev and client Lou Kasischke many of the climbers did not believe the weather was good enough to attempt Everest. Several teams of climbers from other expeditions had tried to summit Everest on this day but turned back because of snow and high wind. They were the first teams to try to summit Everest in 1996.

7:00 p.m. A Yugoslav team returned to Camp IV after failing to reach the summit of Everest. They blamed bad weather for their failure. One member of the team was so exhausted he had to be carried into the camp.

10:00 p.m. The weather had improved, the stars could be seen, and Hall and Fischer decided to attempt to summit Everest. The two Sherpa leaders (sirdars), Lopsang and Ang Dorje Sherpa, were supposed to depart Camp IV to place ropes on difficult places for the safety of clients en route to the summit of Everest. Ang said Lopsang didn't show up.

11:30 p.m. Rob Hall, two Adventure Consultants guides, eight clients, and five climbing Sherpas left Camp IV to attempt to summit Everest. Hall left two Sherpas behind to maintain the camp and to be prepared for the return of the climbers. Hall gave instruction to his clients that they were to remain within 100 m (330 ft) of each other in the dark during the first half of their summit attempt. Hall said his word was law and that he would tolerate no dissention. Hall brought up the rear of the climbers as the "sweep" to help slow climbers and those with difficulties. A problem resulting from that, according to Kasischke, was that "leading from the back", Hall had not delegated any authority to his two guides, Michael Groom and Andy Harris, who were near the front of the column of climbers.

== 10 May ==
12:00 a.m. Scott Fischer, two Mountain Madness guides, six clients, and seven climbing Sherpas left Camp IV to attempt to summit Everest. Fischer left one Sherpa at Camp IV to maintain the camp and assist returning climbers. Gammelgaard said that Fischer's clients were younger and faster than Hall's and they soon caught up. Krakauer said in retrospect that Fischer was exhausted and might have been ill. He lagged behind many of the other climbers.

3:00 a.m. One of Rob Hall's clients, Frank Fischbeck, gave up on the ascent and returned to Camp IV.

4 a.m. The guides and clients of Fischer's and Hall's groups were intermingled on the mountain. The Taiwanese Makalu accompanied Hall and Fischer making a total of 33 people climbing toward the summit of Everest on this day.

Krakauer complained that the stronger members of the team (himself, guide Mike Groom, and Sherpa Ang Dorje) had to wait forty-five minutes for the slower members of the team to catch up.

Krakauer said that Lopsang was vomiting and was exhausted. His exhaustion was due to ascending to Camp IV on 8 May carrying Sandy Pittman's radio and because on this morning he was short-roping Pittman up the slope. Short-roping means he was towing her uphill as a horse might pull a wagon. The short-roping incident might explain why Lopsang had not been up the mountain earlier on 10 May to fix ropes on difficult parts of the climb. In a response to Krakauer, Lopsang said that he always vomited when above an elevation of 8,000 m (26,000 ft) and that he was not told by Fischer to short-rope Pittman. He said he always short-roped any expedition member having trouble, and this time it was Pittman.

5:30 a.m. the first problem the climbers encountered was at the Balcony, 8,400 m (27,600 ft) in elevation, a small flat area en route to the South Summit of Everest, 8,749 m (28,704 ft) in elevation. The ropes had not been fixed when the clients arrived. Ang, lead Sherpa of Hall's group, was there, but had not tried to fix them by himself. Neal Beidleman, a guide for Fischer, undertook the hazardous task of climbing above the clients to place safety ropes along their path to the summit. The clients huddled below. Accounts differ as to how large a problem fixing the ropes was. Krakauer said the delay was an hour.

The morning dawned without a cloud in the sky, appearing to be a perfect day. At Camp II, the IMAX team with their telescope followed the progress of climbers heading upward.

7:30 a.m. Hall's client Beck Weathers was having trouble with his vision at the Balcony. Unless his vision cleared up, Hall told him to stay at the Balcony. He was going to continue ascending and would help Weathers when he came back down. Weathers said, "It didn't enter my mind that he might never come back."

9:58 a.m. Fischer's guide Neal Beidleman reached the South Summit, 8,749 m (28,704 ft) in elevation. Only Boukreev was above Beidleman.

10:30 a.m. Fischer's client Martin Adams made it to the South Summit. He and Beidleman sat there for the next hour waiting for additional climbers to arrive. The guide ropes below the South Summit were jammed up with slower climbers inhibiting the progress of faster climbers. Beidleman was worried that it was becoming late to arrive at the summit. Both climbers were worried about running out of oxygen.

11:00 a.m. Krakauer and guide Andy Harris made it to the South Summit. Ang Dorje and another Sherpa arrived at about the same time. Ang was exhausted. The next obstacle was the Hillary Step, a rock wall that was perhaps the most dangerous section of the Everest climb. The Sherpas appeared in no hurry to fix ropes.

11:40 a.m. Just below the South Summit, their progress impeded by a log jam of climbers, clients Lou Kasischke, Stuart Hutchison, and John Taske turned around and headed back toward Camp IV. They abandoned their attempt to summit Everest because they calculated they could not make it to the summit in time to ensure a safe return down the mountain. Client Martin Adams, continuing to climb, wondered where Scott Fischer was and whether either Boukreev or Beidleman had the authority to turn around climbers who could not arrive at the summit in time for a safe return.

At the Hillary Step, guide Beidleman asked the Sherpas to fix the ropes. They declined. The guides Beidleman, Harris, and Boukreev then proceeded to fix the ropes. Krakauer said that another "hour had already trickled away." He was worried that he would run out of oxygen and received Beidleman's permission to hurry onward to the summit.

1:07 p.m. Boukreev summited Everest. Guide Andy Harris summited shortly thereafter.

1:12 p.m. Jon Krakauer summited.

1:25 p.m. Beidleman and Martin Adams summited. They met Krakauer and Harris who were already descending.

1:40 p.m. Klev Schoening summited

Ed Viesturs with the IMAX team was observing the climbers from Camp II. With a telescope, he watched climbers still moving slowly toward the summit. He said, "it's way too late...they're really pushing it." Coming down from the summit, Martin Adams encountered Rob Hall and a group of climbers still ascending at the Hillary Step. He asked Hall if anybody needed help, and Hall said no. Adams noted that the climbers had now used up 14 hours of their 18-hour supply of oxygen and might not have enough oxygen to descend to Camp IV.

2:00 p.m About two hours after they began their descent, clients Kasikschke, Hutchison, and Taske found Beck Weathers seated at the Balcony awaiting the return of Rob Hall who had continued up the mountain. They asked Weathers if he wished to descend with them. Weathers said no. He had promised Hall that he would remain at the Balcony. He mentioned he was becoming colder.

2:20 p.m. Charlotte Fox and Tim Madsen summited, twenty minutes after the turn-around time of 2:00 p.m.

2:30 p.m. Pittman, Gammelgaard, and Lopsang summited. Rob Hall, guide Mike Groom, and Japanese climber Yasuko Namba soon followed. Hall radioed Helen Wilton at Base Camp that it was cold and windy but everything was fine. He said he would help Doug Hansen summit and then descend. Hall's organization sent out faxes to families and friends of the climbers announcing their success.

Boukreev started down from the summit en route to Camp IV. A total of 23 people summited Everest on this day but most of them either lingered too long at the summit or reached the top after the 2:00 p.m turn around time to have a safe passage downward.

2:45 p.m. Boukreev encounted Scott Fischer at the top of the Hillary Step. Boukreev said he proposed to Fischer, and Fischer agreed, that he should descend as fast as possible to Camp IV on the South Col to be prepared to help returning climbers. Boukreev and Fischer did not observe any problem with the weather at this time. The decision by Boukreev to return to Camp IV rather that remaining with the clients became one of the most controversial actions of the day. Boukreev, Krakauer, Adams, and Harris descended the Hillary Step.

3:10 p.m. Guide Neil Beidleman persuaded Pittman, Gamelgaard, Fox, and Madsen at the summit to begin the descent. He was well aware that it was late in the day. Pittman had already run out of her third canister of oxygen, probably due to using it at a higher rate than the recommended rate. Lopsang gave her the bottle of oxygen he carried.

3:45 p.m. Scott Fischer contacted Base Camp by radio to report that he and all his clients had summited. He also said, "I'm so tired." His base station doctor told him "to get down the mountain." He began his descent shortly thereafter as did his lead Sherpa, Lopsang.

Krakauer had run out of oxygen and was in distress near the Hillary Step. Guide Michael Groom gave Krakauer his oxygen canister and Krakauer proceeded downward to the Southern Summit where a cache of oxygen bottles were present. He took another bottle and began his descent to Camp IV. Hall's guide Andy Harris stopped his descent and remained at the South Summit, possibly because he was hypoxic, confused, and unable to continue. Harris claimed to other climbers that the oxygen bottles stock-piled at the South Summit were empty, which was not true.

4:00 p.m. Breashears and his team in Camp II saw clouds welling up and rolling toward them. The summit of Everest was covered with clouds.

Doug Hansen reached the summit of Everest assisted by Rob Hall. After only a minute or two, they began their descent, already much too late in the day to go down safely.

4:15 p.m. Descending, Fischer's guide Beidleman arrived at the South Summit with several clients. He implored the climbers with him to go down as quickly as possible. It was already too late to reach Camp IV by nighttime. Pittman was in a confused state. Fox gave her a shot of dexamethosone and Beidleman asked Gammelgaard to give Pittman her full oxygen tank in exchange for Pittman's nearly empty one. After a few minutes Pittman revived.

4:30 p.m. Hall radioed his guide Andy Harris from above the South Summit and told him that their client Doug Hansen had collapsed and needed oxygen. Hall said he was staying with Hansen to help him. Harris tried to go to Hall's aid but, suffering from altitude sickness, apparently fell off a cliff. His body has never been found.

5:00 p.m. Bourkeev reached Camp IV, having descended from the summit of Everest in 3 hours. He was the first climber to arrive at Camp IV after climbing Everest. He was exhausted and retired to a tent to rest.

Beck Weathers, nearly blind, had been waiting all day at the Balcony for Hall to descend and help return him to Camp IV. Krakauer, described as exhausted, came by on his way down the mountain. He said that Hall was at least three hours away and said he would help him, but guide Mike Groom would be along in twenty minutes. Weathers decided to wait for Groom.

5:14 p.m. Guy Cotter from Base Camp radioed Adventure Consultant's leader Rob Hall and asked if he was coming down the mountain from the summit. Hall said he was. He and Hanson were just above the Hillary Step.

5:30 p.m. Groom and Japanese climber Yasuko Namba, coming down, arrived at the Balcony where Weathers waited. Weathers described Namba as "a walking corpse." Guide Neil Beidleman came down shortly afterwards with Pittman, Madsen, and Fox—all of whom were "close to the limits of their endurance." Beidleman took charge of Namba and Groom short-roped Weathers to help him descend. The group continued downhill together. Groom served as Weathers' eyes as his vision was impaired.

5:35 p.m. Cotter radioed Hall again and found that he had not descended since the earlier call. Client Doug Hansen, who was apparently unable to move, was with Hall. "Alarm bells went off" in Cotter's head.

5:45 p.m. Cotter radioed Hall again and suggested that he might have to abandon Hansen and descend. At the same time, Dr. Hunt at Base Camp learned by radio that Mountain Madness leader Scott Fischer and Lopsang were just below the South Summit. They were out of oxygen and Fischer was "very weak."

6:00 p.m. Lopsang found Fischer just above the Balcony. Fischer was delirious. Lopsang short-roped him down the mountain until Fischer was unable to walk. Fischer told Lopsang to go down, but Lopsang initially denied Fischer's request.

Clients Kasischke, Taske, and Hutchinson arrived at Camp IV, having taken about six hours to descent from the South Summit. Kasischke was snowblind. The blizzard hit in full force as they neared the tents. Taske described it as a "wall of snow." The noise was like a "dozen express trains." The three men took refuge in the tents at Camp IV. Up the mountain, Sandy Pittman said walking was like "swimming in a bottle of milk." Hall's guide Michael Groom said "visibility was down to nothing" and he and a dozen climbers still descending were "hopelessly lost." An additional danger, given the lack of visibility, was that the climbers might walk off a cliff.

6:45 p.m Jon Krakauer reached the South Col and Camp IV. He retired to his tent, barely conscious, "delirious from exhaustion, dehydration, and...oxygen deprivation." The guides Beidleman and Groom and clients Pittman, Weathers, Namba, Fox, Schoening, Gammelgaard, and Madsen were descending as a group. Two Sherpas also lost in the storm joined them. The blizzard had intensified.

7:30 p.m The Beidleman group made it to the relatively flat terrain of the South Col and knew they were near Camp IV, but lost and worried that they might fall off the cliffs bordering the Col. They huddled in a group, they called a "dogpile", to try to stay warm and awake.

8:00 p.m. Makalu Gao, descending the mountain, found Fischer and Lopsang. Fischer persuaded Lopsang to go down to Camp IV by telling him, "You go down. Send up Anatoli [Bourkreev]." Lopsang descended. Makalu, also in poor condition, remained with Fischer.

== 11 May ==
12:00 a.m. During a brief moment of clear skies, guides Neil Beidleman and Mike Groom made it to Camp IV along with clients Gammelgaard, Schoening, and the two Sherpas. They were exhausted but they reported to Boukreev that five clients were stranded without guides on the eastern side of the South Col about 400 m (1,300 ft) distant. The still-stranded clients were Pittman, Weathers, Fox, Namba, and Madsen. Missing and location unknown were Fischer, Hall, Harris, and Hansen.

Lopsang returned to Camp IV at about the same time. He said Fischer, still up the mountain, was delirious and suffering from what seemed cerebral edema. He asked Boukreev to rescue Fischer.

Boukreev departed Camp IV, alone, as nobody was willing or able to accompany him. He was carrying oxygen and hot tea to help the missing clients. He was unable to find them in the darkness and the blowing snow.

2:00 a.m. Boukreev returned to Camp IV after failing to find the nearby stranded clients. He talked to Schoening, Gammelgaard, and Beidleman again to learn more about their location and departed camp again to search for the clients. The Sherpas and others at Camp IV declined to go with him into the storm. They were exhausted and the weather was life-threatening. Boukreev found the stranded clients only 30 m (98 ft) from where he had searched before. The visibility was so bad he had not seen or heard them on his previous trip. He said Madsen, Pittman, and Fox were huddled together. Namba was laying nearby, unconscious. Weathers had wandered away. He gave oxygen to Pittman who couldn't speak; Fox and Madsen were in slightly better shape. He took Fox down first to Camp IV, leaving a bottle of oxygen for Madsen and Pittman to share.

3:00 a.m. Boukreev arrived at Camp IV with Fox in tow. He again asked for help from the Sherpas, clients, and guides at the camp, but nobody was willing to go with him to rescue Madsen and Pittman. He went out again, alone.

4:00 a.m. Boukreev found Madsen and Pittman, somewhat revived from the oxygen he had earlier given them. Namba was two meters away, unresponsive. Accounts differ as to whether Weathers was nearby or had wandered away and was missing. Boukreev helped Madsen and Pittman walk to Camp IV.

4:45 a.m. Boukreev, Madsen, and Pittman reached Camp IV safely.

Rob Hall called base camp on his radio from the South Summit. He asked if somebody was coming to retrieve him. Ed Viesturs and others at base camp encouraged him to make his way downwards toward Camp IV. Hall said, "Doug [Hansen] was gone." The meaning of that phrase was uncertain.

5:00 a.m. Gammelgaard woke up with Boukreev in the tent with her. "He's just sitting there and he's absolutely empty. There's nothing left of him." Gammelgaard had to help Boukreev into his sleeping bag.

6:00 a.m. Base Camp talked to Rob Hall on the radio. It was obvious he was in very poor condition.

7:00 a.m. Client Stuart Hutchinson, a medical doctor, and a team of four Sherpas found Weathers and Namba. He said Weathers and Namba were dead and Scott Fischer was missing. The batteries of the radios of the IMAX team down at Camp II were dead and David Breashears asked the South African team to lend their radio for the rescue effort. Ian Woodall, the South African leader, declined the request.

8:00 a.m. Sherpas awakened sleeping climbers to tell them to prepare to descend from Camp IV and the South Col. Gammelgaard could barely walk. One of the Sherpas helped her go down the mountain to Camp II.

9:00 a.m. Ed Viesturs on the radio told Rob Hall, "Just get yourself down." Hall had apparently not been able to begin the descent from the South Summit. Hall expressed concern about guide Andy Harris who was missing, but Viesturs said not to worry about Harris.

9:30 a.m. Five Sherpas, including Ang Dorje, departed from Camp IV to search for Rob Hall, Scott Fischer, and Makalu Gao. Hall was believed to be near the South Summit. Fischer and Makalu were believed to be 400 m (1,300 ft) above Camp IV.

4:00 p.m. Ang Dorje and another Sherpa dispatched to find Hall returned to Camp IV. They had climbed to within 240 m (790 ft) of the South Summit but had been forced by the weather to turn back. They left a ski pole and full oxygen tanks at their highest point. This ended the last possible rescue attempt that might have retrieved Rob Hall alive.

Shortly after the return of Ang, three more Sherpas returned to Camp IV. They had with them Makalu Gau, the Taiwanese climber, who was badly frostbitten. They had found him near Scott Fischer about 300 m (980 ft) above the camp. Fischer was unresponsive but said to be barely breathing. Of the climbers at Camp IV, only Boukreev was physically capable of making another attempt to rescue Fischer. He was discouraged from making the attempt by the other guides.

4:30 p.m. Boukreev was preparing to climb up to Fischer when client Beck Weathers, abandoned as dead, stumbled into Camp IV. He had walked by himself to Camp IV despite severe frostbite of his hands and face. He was near death. The guides put him in a tent, gave him oxygen, and attempted to warm him. His survival was considered miraculous.

5:00 p.m. Energized by Weather's return, Boukreev believed that Scott Fischer might still be alive. The other guides told him to give Fischer an injection of dexamethasone if he found him. The drug increases energy and combats cerebral endema. Boukreev departed Camp IV.

6:20 p.m. Base Camp patched Rob Hall near the South Summit into a telephone call with his pregnant wife in New Zealand. A mountain climber herself, Jan Hall, was aware of the severity of Hall's condition. He said to her, "I think I have a bit of frostbite." His last words were, "I love you. Sleep well. Please don't worry too much." Sometime in the next few hours, Rob Hall died.

7:05 p.m. Bourkeev found Fischer 300 m (980 ft) above Camp IV. Bourkeev said, "His oxygen mask is around face, but bottle is empty. He is not wearing mittens; hands completely bare. Down suit is unzipped, pulled off his shoulder; one arm is outside clothing...Scott is dead."

== 13 May ==
Two climbers, Beck Weathers of Adventure Consultants and Makalu Gao of the Taiwanese team, were badly frostbitten and would lose limbs. Other climbers and Sherpas led and carried them downward from Camp IV on the South Col to Camp I. A Nepali pilot, Colonel Madan Khatri Chhetri, made a dangerous landing of a helicopter near Camp I and evacuated them to a hospital. A Spanish climber, Araceli Segarra, defined the landing site by drawing an "X" on the ground with Kool-Aid. At 20,000 ft (6,100 m), this was the highest helicopter landing in the world up until that time.

== 23 May ==
Descending the mountain on May 23, 1996, Ed Viesturs with the IMAX crew located the body of Rob Hall, just below the South Summit.
