= Andy Harris (mountain guide) =

New Zealand mountain guide (1964–1996)

Andy Harris NZBS
- Born: Andrew Michael Harris; 29 September 1964; Salisbury, Wiltshire, England
- Died: 11 May 1996 (aged 31); Mount Everest, Nepal
- Education: Francis Douglas College
- Occupations: Mountain guide, heliskiing guide
- Employer: Adventure Consultants

Andrew Michael Harris NZBS (29 September 1964 – 11 May 1996), known as Andy Harris, was a New Zealand mountain guide who died in the 1996 Mount Everest disaster. Harris was one of the guides for the Adventure Consultants' 1996 Everest expedition, led by Rob Hall. It was Harris' first attempt to summit Mount Everest, though he had extensive climbing experience in New Zealand.

== Biography ==
At the time of his death, Harris was survived by his parents Ron and Marry Harris, his older brother David Harris, and his physician girlfriend Fiona McPherson. He was living with McPherson and in the process of building a house with her in the hills outside Queenstown.

At a younger age, Harris was a student at Francis Douglas Memorial College in New Plymouth. During the winter months, Harris was employed as a helicopter skiing guide. During the summers, he worked for scientists conducting archaeological research in Antarctica as a New Zealand Antarctic Research Programme (NZARP) field leader from 1987 until 1992, and escorted climbers into New Zealand's Southern Alps.

In 1985 Harris climbed Chobutse (6690m), a difficult peak which stands 44 kilometres (27 mi) west of Everest. In the fall of 1994, he helped McPherson in a medical clinic in Pheriche. The clinic's main purpose was to treat altitude-related illnesses.

== 1996 Everest disaster ==
The Adventure Consultants' Everest expedition of 1996 consisted of three guides (Rob Hall, Mike Groom, and Andy Harris) and eight clients (Frank Fischbeck, Doug Hansen, Stuart Hutchison, Lou Kasischke, Jon Krakauer, Yasuko Namba, John Taske, and Beck Weathers).

Before even reaching Base Camp, Harris suffered from multiple gastrointestinal attacks at the lodge in Lobuje, while the party was preparing to go to Base Camp. Despite being advised to remain at Lobuje one more night, Harris proceeded to Base Camp with the rest of the party on 8 April 1996.

On 8 May during a climb, Harris was struck in the chest by a boulder the size of a small television. Although shocked, Harris continued to climb, but later realized that if the boulder had hit his head, he would not have survived.

On May 9 at 11:30 p.m. local time the group - followed shortly thereafter by several other expeditions - headed for the summit. A climber from another expedition called them "old" and "slow." In the early hours of May 10 one client and a Sherpa aborted their climb, and by noon five out of eight team members had ended their summit bids.

At approximately 1:12 p.m., Harris, Anatoli Boukreev, and Krakauer reached the top of Everest. They then started to descend. Krakauer asked Harris if Harris could turn off Krakauer's oxygen, to save it. Harris complied but accidentally turned the oxygen all the way up.

Later on, Harris checked on some oxygen canisters near the Southeast Ridge, and stated they were all empty, which they were not. It is believed Harris was suffering from hypoxia, which would explain some of the irrational actions he took. It has, however, never been proven.

Upon returning to Camp IV, Krakauer, possibly suffering from the effects of hypoxia, believed he had encountered Harris on the ridge above camp. Krakauer reported having seen him fall over the ridge to camp, stand, and stumble back towards camp. Krakauer, meanwhile, took the longer route around back to the tents but reported to others at camp that Harris had safely returned. Months later, while interviewing Mountain Madness client Martin Adams, Krakauer realized that the climber he encountered was in fact Adams and not Harris. In the morning, on May 11, after a search of camp, the climbers at Camp IV realized that Harris was missing.

Krakauer, who survived the disaster, wrote a magazine article and then a book on the subject after the events. Regarding his failure to recognize that Andy Harris was weakened and acting irrationally from altitude and lack of oxygen, Krakauer wrote that his own "actions – or failure to act – played a direct role in the death of Andy Harris."

Harris's ice axe and jacket were found near Rob Hall's body several days later. Before he died, Hall also mentioned that Harris had been with him, but was now missing. It is likely that Harris went to aid Rob Hall and Doug Hansen when they were trapped higher up on the mountain as the storm came in. It is unknown what happened to him, as his body was never found.

== Memorial ==
A few minutes from Gorakshep towards the Everest Base Camp, a memorial was built for the members of the Adventure Consultants' team that died during the expedition: Andy Harris, Rob Hall, Doug Hansen and Yasuko Namba.

== Legacy ==
In 1998, New Zealand Geographic Board named a peak at Victoria Land, Antarctica, after Harris. Harris Peak is located between Mount Hall and Ball Peak, names associated with Harris's.

For his bravery, Harris received the New Zealand Bravery Star in 1999, and his old school held a special tribute in his honor.

In the 2015 film Everest, Harris was portrayed by actor Martin Henderson.

== See also ==
- List of Mount Everest guides
- Timeline of the 1996 Mount Everest disaster
