= Yasuko Namba =

Japanese mountain climber (1949–1996)

- Born: Yasuko Tanaka; February 7, 1949; Ōta City, Tokyo, Japan
- Died: May 11, 1996 (aged 47); Mount Everest, Nepal
- Cause of death: Hypothermia
- Resting place: Japan
- Education: Waseda University, School of Humanities and Social sciences
- Known for: Oldest woman to complete the Seven Summits up to 1996; Oldest woman to climb Mount Everest up to; 1996 Mount Everest disaster
- Spouse: Kenichi Namba

Yasuko Namba (難波 康子, Nanba Yasuko; February 7, 1949 – May 11, 1996) was the second Japanese woman (after Junko Tabei) to climb the Seven Summits. Namba worked as a businesswoman for FedEx in Japan, but her hobby of mountaineering took her all over the world. She first summited Kilimanjaro on New Year's Day in 1982, and summited Aconcagua exactly two years later. She reached the summit of Denali on July 1, 1985, and the summit of Mount Elbrus on August 1, 1992. After summiting Vinson Massif on December 29, 1993, and Carstensz Pyramid on November 12, 1994, Namba's final summit to reach was Mount Everest. She signed on with Rob Hall's guiding company, Adventure Consultants, and reached the summit in May 1996, but died during her descent in the 1996 Mount Everest disaster.

== Personal and professional life ==
Prior to her involvement in the Everest disaster, Yasuko Namba had been employed by FedEx as a personnel manager in Tokyo, Japan.

She was survived by her husband, Kenichi Namba, and her brother, both of whom later traveled to Nepal with the hope of retrieving her body from Everest.

== Death ==
On May 10, 1996, the 47-year-old Namba reached the summit of Everest, becoming the oldest woman to do so (her record was later broken by Anna Czerwińska of Poland who summited Everest at age 50). She was still high on the mountain rather late into the afternoon, and was descending when a blizzard struck. Namba, fellow client Beck Weathers, and their guide Mike Groom from Adventure Consultants and clients from Scott Fischer's Mountain Madness were stuck on the South Col, while a whiteout prevented them from knowing where their camp was located. Groom later said that Namba insisted on putting her oxygen mask on despite the fact that she had run out of oxygen. Both Namba and Weathers were so weak that the two guides (Groom and Neal Beidleman from Mountain Madness) had to support them. Although the group tried to head to the camp, the guides soon realized it was pointless and dangerous, and waited for a break in the storm.

One of Fischer's guides, Anatoli Boukreev, set out from Camp IV into the night to find the cluster of trapped climbers. After assisting several other people, he came back one last time for Sandy Pittman and Tim Madsen. Boukreev, who assumed that Namba was dead and Weathers was a "lost cause," left the two alone. The following day, Stuart Hutchinson, one of the clients on Adventure Consultants, organized a search party to find both Namba and Weathers. Hutchinson found both in such bad shape that they were unlikely to live long enough to be carried down to Base Camp, and he decided to leave the two alone to save limited resources for the other climbers.

While Weathers survived against all expectations and walked back to camp, Namba died from exhaustion and exposure. Jon Krakauer's book, Into Thin Air, describes the anguish of Neal Beidleman, who felt guilty that he was unable to do anything more to save Namba. Boukreev's book, The Climb, expressed profound regret at her lonely death, saying that she was just a little 90-pound woman and that someone should have dragged her back to camp so she could at least die among her companions. On a later expedition to Everest with the Indonesian National Team, Boukreev found Namba's body on April 28, 1997. He constructed a cairn around her to protect her from scavenging birds, and a few days later apologized to her widower for failing to save Namba's life. Later in 1997, her husband funded an operation that brought her body down the mountain.

In 2008, materials created by the PBS program "Frontline" for David Breashears' film Storm Over Everest, John Taske described Namba and presented his thoughts on factors which may have contributed to her death, saying "She was a little lady; I've never met a girl more determined. About 100 pounds in weight, no more, but as far as determination goes, she was twice that weight in determination. However, nature being what it is, hypothermia, body mass – she had a small body mass; she would have gotten desperately cold much more quickly than an average person twice her weight."

When asked for her thoughts regarding Namba's Seven Summits achievement and subsequent death, Junko Tabei, the first woman to summit Everest, told a reporter from United Press International, Inc. in mid-May 1996: "I jumped for joy when I heard she did it, but I feel like I have lost my sister and I am very sorry."

== Legacy ==
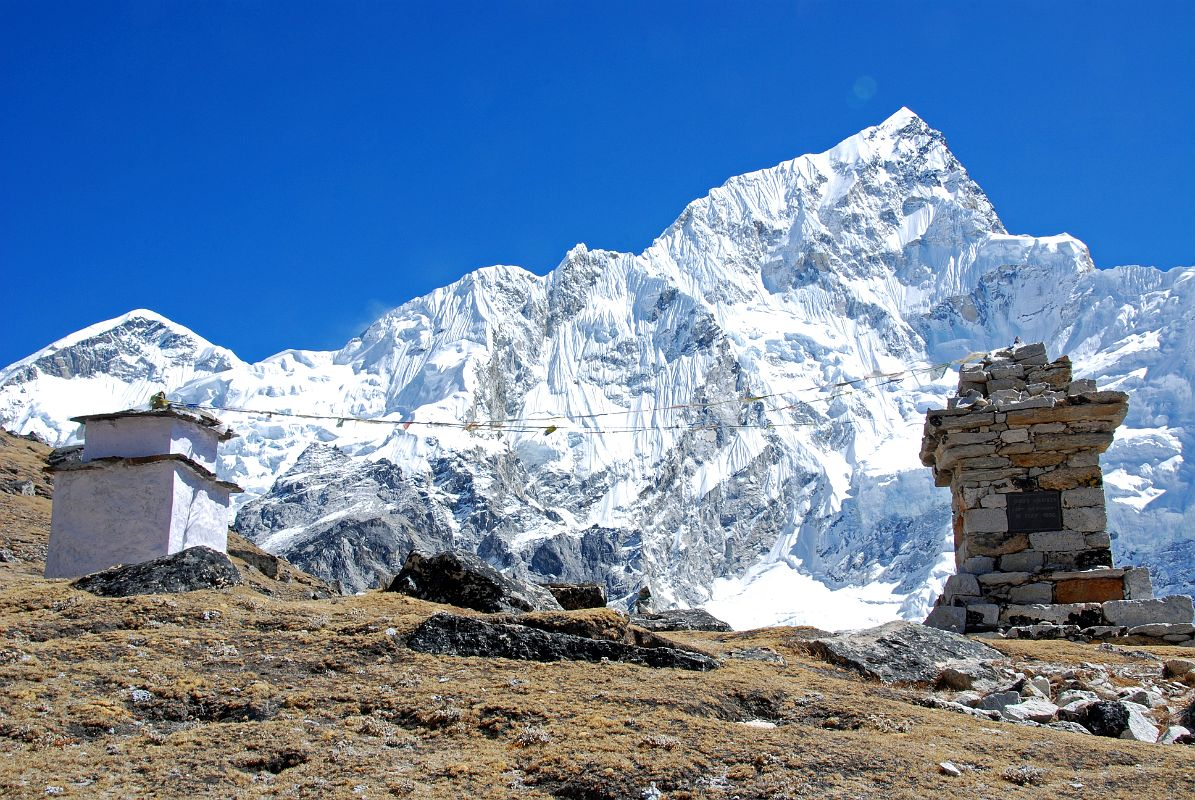
The memorial chortens for Rob Hall, Doug Hansen, Andy Harris, and Yasuko Namba

After the 1996 disaster, two memorial chortens were built near Gorak Shep by the Sherpas: one for Rob Hall and the other for Rob Hall's teammates Doug Hansen, Andy Harris, and Yasuko Namba. The two chortens are connected by prayer flags.

== Film portrayals ==
- Akemi Otani portrayed Namba in the 1997 TV movie Into Thin Air: Death on Everest.
- Naoko Mori played Namba in the 2015 movie Everest.

== See also ==
- List of people who died climbing Mount Everest
