= 1996 Mount Everest disaster =

Death of eight climbers

- The climb began at the Everest base camp, proceeded upward through the Khumbu icefall, the Western Cwm, the Lhotse face. and the South Col.
- Date: 10–11 May 1996
- Location: Mount Everest Altitude 8,849 metres (29,032 ft); 27°59′17″N 86°55′30″E
- Organised by: Adventure Consultants; Mountain Madness; Indo-Tibetan Border Police
- Deaths: 8

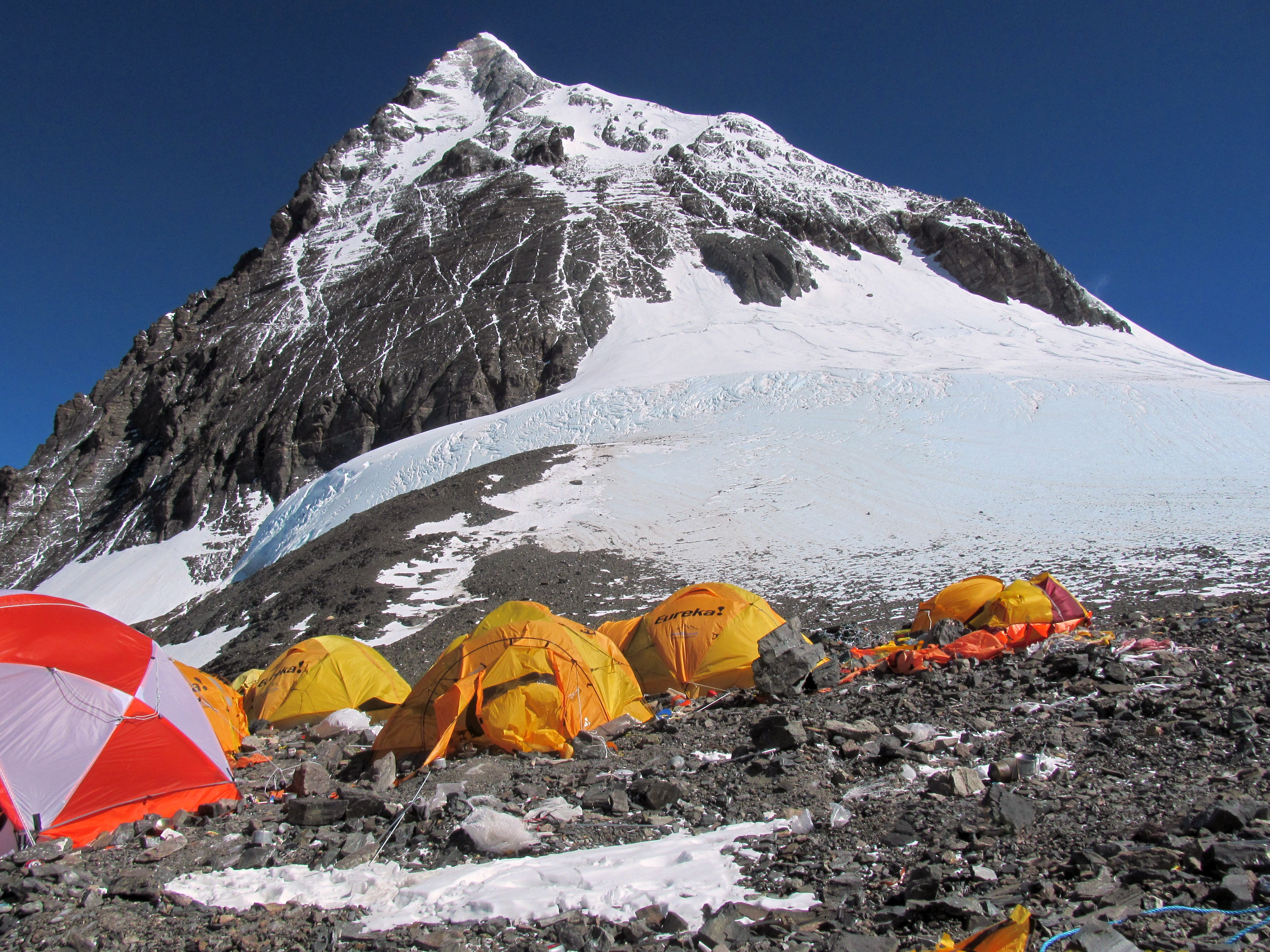
Camp IV at the South Col, looking upward at the summit of Everest.

On 10–11 May 1996, eight climbers were caught in a blizzard and died on Mount Everest while attempting to descend from the summit. Over that season, 12 people died trying to reach the summit. These deaths marked that season the deadliest season on Mount Everest until it became the third deadliest after the 23 fatalities from avalanches caused by the April 2015 Nepal earthquake and the 16 fatalities of the 2014 Mount Everest avalanche. The 1996 disaster received widespread publicity, raised questions about the commercialisation of Everest, and prompted an enduring controversy about who and what was at fault for the disaster.

Numerous climbers were at a high altitude on Everest during the storm including the Adventure Consultants team, led by Rob Hall, and the Mountain Madness team, led by Scott Fischer. While climbers died on both the North Face and South Col approaches, the events on the latter were more widely reported. On the South Col approach, four members of the Adventure Consultants expedition died, including Hall, while Fischer was the sole casualty of the Mountain Madness expedition. Three officers of the Indo-Tibetan Border Police died on the North Face.

Following the disaster, several survivors wrote memoirs. Journalist Jon Krakauer, on assignment from Outside magazine and on the Adventure Consultants team, published Into Thin Air (1997), which became a bestseller. Anatoli Boukreev, a guide in the Mountain Madness team, felt impugned by the book and co-authored a rebuttal called The Climb: Tragic Ambitions on Everest (1997). Beck Weathers, of Hall's expedition, and Lene Gammelgaard, of Fischer's expedition, wrote about their experiences in their respective books, Left for Dead: My Journey Home from Everest (2000) and Climbing High: A Woman's Account of Surviving the Everest Tragedy (2000). In 2014, Lou Kasischke, also of Hall's expedition, published his own account in After the Wind: 1996 Everest Tragedy, One Survivor's Story.

In addition to the members of the Adventure Consultants and Mountain Madness teams, Mike Trueman, who coordinated the rescue from Base Camp, contributed The Storms: Adventure and Tragedy on Everest (2015). Graham Ratcliffe, who climbed to the South Col of Everest on 10 May, noted in A Day to Die For (2011) that weather reports forecasting a major storm developing after 8 May and peaking in intensity on 11 May were delivered to expedition leaders. Hall and Fischer received these before their planned summit attempts on 10 May. Some of their climbers summited Everest during an apparent break in this developing storm only for it to return in full force as they descended late on 10 May.

== Climbers ==
The following is a list of climbers en route to the summit on 10 May 1996 via the South Col and Southeast Ridge, organized by expedition and role. All ages listed are those recorded in 1996.

=== Adventure Consultants ===
The Adventure Consultants' 1996 Everest expedition, led by Rob Hall, consisted of 19 people, including eight clients.

==== Guides ====
- Rob Hall (35) (New Zealand) – expedition leader; died near the South Summit
- Michael Groom (37) (Australia) – professional mountaineer
- Andy Harris (31) (New Zealand) – disappeared near the South Summit while assisting Hall

==== Clients ====
- Frank Fischbeck (53) (Hong Kong) – had attempted Everest three times and reached the South Summit in 1994
- Doug Hansen (46) (USA) – had previously attempted Everest with Hall's team in 1995; disappeared near the South Summit while descending with Hall
- Stuart Hutchison (34) (Canada) – youngest client on Hall's team; previous 8,000 m experiences included K2 winter expedition in 1988, Broad Peak west ridge in 1992, and Everest north side in 1994
- Lou Kasischke (53) (USA) – had climbed six of the Seven Summits
- Jon Krakauer (42) (USA) – journalist on assignment from Outside magazine; an accomplished technical climber, but had no experience in climbing peaks over 8,000 m
- Yasuko Namba (47) (Japan) – had climbed six of the Seven Summits; became the oldest woman to summit Everest at the time; died on the South Col
- John Taske (56) (Australia) – oldest climber on the Adventure Consultants team; no 8,000 m experience
- Beck Weathers (49) (USA) – had been climbing for 10 years and was also making a bid for the Seven Summits, but had no 8,000 m experience

==== Sherpas ====
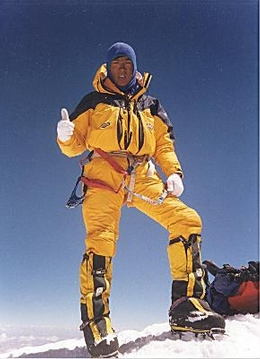
Ang Dorje Sherpa

- Sardar Ang Dorje (26)
- Arita
- Chuldum
- Kami
- Lhakpa Chhiri
- Ngawang Norbu
- Tenzing

The Sherpas listed above were the climbing Sherpas hired by Rob Hall's Adventure Consultants. Many other Sherpas working at lower elevations performed duties vital to the Adventure Consultants and Mountain Madness expeditions. Most climbing Sherpas' duties required them to ascend at least to Camp III or IV, but not all of them to summit. The expedition leaders intended for only a select few of their climbing Sherpas to accompany clients to the summit. Legendary Sardar Apa Sherpa was scheduled to accompany the Adventure Consultants group but withdrew due to family commitments.

With the exception of Namba, no client on Hall's team had reached the summit of an 8,000-meter peak, and only Fischbeck, Hansen, and Hutchison had previous high-altitude Himalayan experience. To compensate for the clients' limited high-altitude backgrounds, Hall relied on his extensive guiding track record and deep Himalayan experience, which dated back to his early technical climbs in the Southern Alps and a milestone ascent of Ama Dablam at age 21. Hall had also brokered a deal with Outside magazine for advertising space in exchange for a story about the growing popularity of commercial expeditions to Everest. Krakauer was originally slated to climb with Scott Fischer's Mountain Madness team, but Hall landed him, at least in part by agreeing to reduce Outside's fee for Krakauer's spot on the expedition to less than cost.

=== Mountain Madness ===
The Mountain Madness 1996 Everest expedition, led by Scott Fischer, consisted of 19 people, including 8 clients.

==== Guides ====
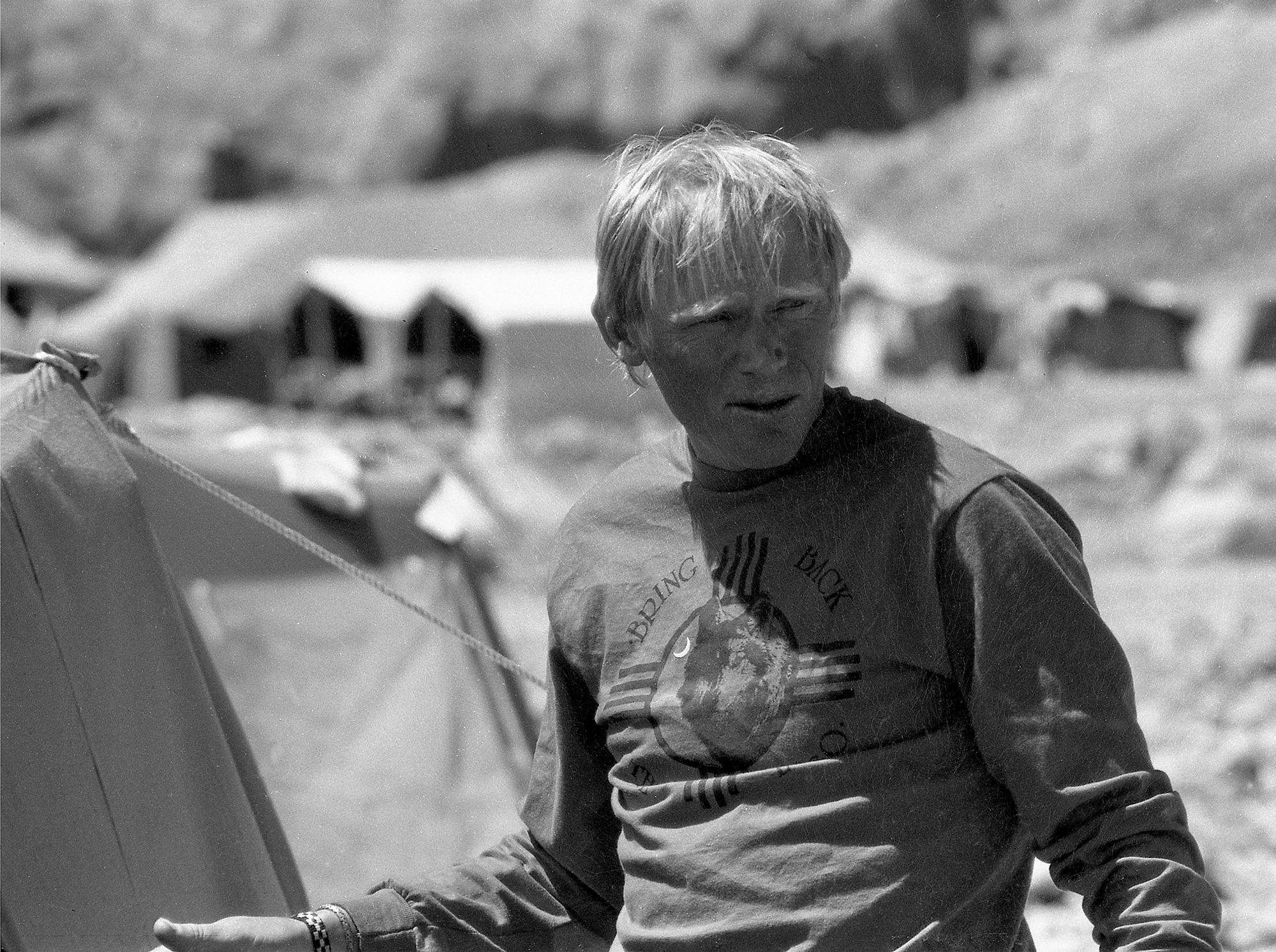
Anatoli "Toli" Boukreev

- Scott Fischer (40) (USA) – expedition leader; died on the Southeast ridge balcony 350 m (1,150 ft) below the South Summit
- Anatoli Boukreev (38) (Kazakhstan/Russia) – professional mountaineer
- Neal Beidleman (36) (USA) – professional mountaineer

==== Clients ====
- Martin Adams (47) (USA) – had climbed Aconcagua, Denali, and Kilimanjaro
- Charlotte Fox (38) (USA) – had climbed all 53 of the 14,000 ft (4,267 m) peaks in Colorado and two 8,000 m peaks, Gasherbrum II and Cho Oyu
- Lene Gammelgaard (35) (Denmark) – an experienced mountaineer
- Dale Kruse (45) (USA) – long-term personal friend of Fischer's and the first to sign up for the 1996 expedition
- Tim Madsen (33) (USA) – had climbed extensively in the Colorado and Canadian Rockies, but had no 8,000 m experience
- Sandy Hill Pittman (41) (USA) – had climbed six of the Seven Summits
- Pete Schoening (68) (USA) – one of the first to climb Gasherbrum I and Mount Vinson; known for singlehandedly saving the lives of six team members during a mass fall in the American expedition on K2 in 1953
- Klev Schoening (38) (USA) – Pete's nephew and a former US national downhill ski racer; no 8,000 m experience

==== Sherpas ====
- Sardar Lopsang Jangbu Sherpa (23)
- "Big" Pemba
- Nawang Dorje
- Ngawang Sya Kya
- Ngawang Tendi
- Ngawang Topche (died a few months later from HAPE he contracted during hauling duties to Camp II)
- Tashi Tshering
- Tendi

The Sherpas listed above were the climbing Sherpas hired by Scott Fischer's Mountain Madness expedition. Ngawang Topche was hospitalized in April; he had developed high-altitude pulmonary edema (HAPE) while ferrying supplies above Base Camp. He was not on the mountain during the summit attempt of 10 May. Topche died from his illness in June 1996.

Pete Schoening decided at Base Camp (5,380 m or 17,650 ft) not to make the final push to the summit. The team began the assault on the summit on 6 May, bypassing Camp I (5,944 m or 19,501 ft) and stopping at Camp II (6,500 m or 21,300 ft) for two nights. However, Kruse suffered from altitude sickness and possible high-altitude cerebral edema (HACE), and stopped at Camp I. Fischer descended from Camp II and escorted Kruse back to Base Camp for treatment.

On 9 June 1996, three days after Sherpa Ngawang Topche died in hospital from high-altitude pulmonary edema, a private memorial service was held for Scott Fischer attended by the climbers and Sherpas from Mountain Madness at Kiana Lodge, near Seattle, Washington. The Sherpa chanted a Buddhist prayer, Beidleman gifted his late friend's engraved expedition knife to Fischer's two children, and Jeannie Price, Fischer's wife, released a cloud of butterflies.

=== Taiwanese expedition ===
"Makalu" Gau Ming-ho led a five-member team to Everest on 10 May 1996.

The previous day (9 May), Taiwanese team member Chen Yu-Nan had died following a fall on the Lhotse Face.

=== Indo-Tibetan Border Police ===
Half of the climbing team from the Indo-Tibetan Border Police North Col expedition from India (Subedar Tsewang Samanla, Lance Naik Dorje Morup, and Head Constable Tsewang Paljor) died on the Northeast Ridge.

== The plan ==
Hall and Fischer's plan for their clients to summit Everest on 10 May was to leave Camp IV on the South Col at midnight, to reach the summit of Everest about 12:00 p.m. and to descend, returning to Camp IV at about 6 p.m. The time required for the round trip would be eighteen hours. Hall established a turn-around time of 2:00 p.m. (some sources say 1 p.m) at which time all climbers, wherever they were on the mountain, were required to begin their return to Camp IV. Hall said that his decision to descend was "absolute law, beyond appeal." Fischer does not seem to have established a firm turn-around time. Thirty-three climbers departed Camp IV on 10 May to climb upward toward the Everest summit. Twenty of them consisted of Hall's and Fisher's guides and clients and the rest were Sherpas and the Taiwanese climber Makalu.

All clients and guides, except Boukreev and a few Sherpas, were required to use supplemental oxygen during the climb. Each client would depart Camp IV, elevation 8,000 m (26,000 ft), with two oxygen tanks (weighing 3 kg (6.6 lb) each) which at a moderate rate of flow each would each last six hours. At the South Summit, 8,749 m (28,704 ft), they would discard their first oxygen bottle and use their second oxygen bottle to summit Everest and return to the South Summit where additional oxygen bottles had been pre-positioned by Sherpas for them. They would use a third bottle for the descent to Camp IV. If they ran out of oxygen before reaching Camp IV, they would begin to suffer the impact of oxygen deprivation. Oxygen was waiting for them at Camp IV after they completed their descent. A rest day or two later, they would leave Camp IV and descend to lower altitudes.

Camp IV, at 8,000 m (26,000 ft) elevation, was at the lower edge of the "death zone" where the body and mind quickly deteriorate due to lack of oxygen in the atmosphere. Hall and Fisher did not have enough bottled oxygen to make a second attempt on Everest from Camp IV if the 10 May attempt failed. They would have to descend to lower elevations from Camp IV and either give up the attempt on Everest or resupply.

== Timeline ==
=== Delays reaching the summit ===
Shortly after midnight on 10 May 1996, the Adventure Consultants expedition of three guides and eight clients plus Sherpas began a summit attempt from Camp IV, atop the South Col (7,900 m or 25,900 ft). They were joined by six client climbers, three guides, and Sherpas from Scott Fischer's Mountain Madness company, as well as one climber and two Sherpas in an expedition sponsored by the government of Taiwan.

The expeditions quickly encountered delays. The climbing Sherpas and guides had not set the fixed ropes by the time the team reached the Balcony (8,350 m or 27,400 ft), and this cost the climbers almost an hour. The cause of this delay is unclear, in part due to the subsequent death of the expedition leaders.

Upon reaching the Hillary Step (8,760 m or 28,740 ft), the climbers again discovered that no fixed line had been placed, and they were forced to wait an hour while the guides installed the ropes. Because some 33 climbers were attempting the summit on the same day, and Hall and Fischer had asked their climbers to stay within 150 m (500 ft) of each other, there was a bottleneck at the single fixed line at the Hillary Step. Hutchison, Kasischke, and Taske returned towards Camp IV as they feared they would run out of supplementary oxygen due to the delays.

Climbing without supplemental oxygen, guide Anatoli Boukreev from the Mountain Madness team was the first to reach the summit (8,848 m or 29,029 ft), at 13:07. Many of the climbers had not yet reached the summit by 14:00, the last safe time to turn around to reach Camp IV before nightfall.

Boukreev began his descent to Camp IV at 14:30, having spent nearly 1.5 hours at or near the summit helping others complete the climb. By that time, Hall, Krakauer, Harris, Beidleman, Namba, and Mountain Madness clients Martin Adams and Klev Schoening had reached the summit, and the remaining four Mountain Madness clients had arrived. After this time, Krakauer noted that the weather did not look so benign. At 15:00, snow started to fall, and the light was diminishing.

Hall's Sirdar, Ang Dorje Sherpa, and other climbing Sherpas waited at the summit for the clients. Near 15:00, they began their descent. On the way down, Ang Dorje encountered client Doug Hansen above the Hillary Step and ordered him to descend. Hansen did not respond verbally, but shook his head and pointed upward, toward the summit. When Hall arrived at the scene, the Sherpas offered to take Hansen to the summit, but Hall sent the Sherpas down to assist the other clients, and instructed them to stash oxygen canisters on the route. Hall said he would remain to help Hansen, who had run out of supplementary oxygen.

Scott Fischer did not summit until 15:45. He was exhausted from the ascent and was becoming increasingly ill, possibly suffering from HAPE, HACE, or a combination of both. Others, including Doug Hansen and Makalu Gau, reached the summit even later.

=== Descent in a blizzard ===
Boukreev recorded that he reached Camp IV by 17:00. Boukreev's reasons for descending ahead of his clients are disputed. Initially, Boukreev said he was going down with client Martin Adams, but later descended faster and left Adams behind. Boukreev also maintained that he wanted to be ready to assist struggling clients farther down the slope, and to retrieve hot tea and extra oxygen if necessary. According to Boukreev, this plan was discussed with and approved by expedition leader Fischer.

Krakauer sharply criticized Boukreev's decision not to use bottled oxygen while employed as a guide. Boukreev's supporters, who include G. Weston DeWalt, co-author of The Climb (1997), state that using bottled oxygen gives a false sense of security. Krakauer and his supporters point out that, without bottled oxygen, Boukreev was unable to directly help his clients descend.

The worsening weather began causing difficulties for the descending team members. The blizzard on the southwest face of Everest was reducing visibility, burying the fixed ropes, and obliterating the trail back to Camp IV that the teams had broken on the ascent. Fischer, helped by Lopsang Jangbu Sherpa, was unable to descend below the Balcony (8,350 m or 27,400 ft) in the storm. Sherpas left Makalu Gau (at 8,230 m or 27,000 ft by Gau's account) with Fischer and Lopsang when Gau, too, became unable to proceed. Eventually, Lopsang was persuaded by Fischer to descend and leave him and Gau.

Hall radioed for help, saying that Hansen had fallen unconscious but was still alive. At 17:30, Adventure Consultants guide Andy Harris, carrying supplementary oxygen and water, began climbing alone from the South Summit (8,749 m or 28,704 ft) toward Hansen and Hall at the top of Hillary Step. Krakauer's account notes that by this time, the weather had deteriorated into a full-scale blizzard: "Snow pellets borne by 70 kn [130 km/h; 81 mph] gusts stung my face." Boukreev gives 18:00 as "the onset of a blizzard".

Several climbers got lost on the descent during the storm. Mountain Madness guide Beidleman and clients Klev Schoening, Fox, Madsen, Pittman, and Gammelgaard, along with Adventure Consultants guide Mike Groom and clients Beck Weathers and Yasuko Namba, wandered in the blizzard until they could no longer walk, huddling some 20 m (66 ft) from a drop-off of the Kangshung Face. Hall's client Stuart Hutchison attempted to organize a rescue effort for those still on the mountain, but could not find anybody willing to leave the South Col. The climbers were exhausted and considered a rescue effort suicidal.

Near midnight, the blizzard cleared sufficiently for the group still on the mountain to see Camp IV, some 400 m (1,300 ft) distant. Beidleman, Groom, Schoening, and Gammelgaard set off to find help and reached Camp IV. They gave Boukreev the approximate locations of the still-stranded climbers above. Madsen and Fox had remained on the mountain with the group in order to shout for the rescuers. Boukreev, alone, left the camp three times and spent most of the night attempting to find the stranded climbers. On his second and third attempt, he located them and escorted Pittman, Fox, and Madsen to safety. Pittman, Fox, and Madsen were from his Mountain Madness expedition. Of the two other people he found, Namba (from the Adventure Consultants expedition), seemed close to death. Beck Weathers had been with the group but had walked away and disappeared into the storm. All of the climbers, including Boukreev, then at Camp IV were too exhausted to make another attempt until the next morning to reach Namba and Weathers.

Mountaineer Galen Rowell described Boukreev's rescue efforts in the Wall Street Journal as "One of the most amazing rescues in mountaineering history performed single-handedly a few hours after climbing Everest without oxygen..." In 1997 Anatoli Boukreev was awarded the David A. Sowles Memorial Award by the American Alpine Club. The award is the American Alpine Club's highest award for valor in recognition of his rescue of climbers in the 1996 Everest disaster.

=== 11 May ===
In the early morning of 11 May, at 04:43, Hall radioed Base Camp that he was on the South Summit (8,749 m or 28,704 ft), confirming that he survived the night. He reported that Harris reached the two men, but Hansen, who was with him since the previous afternoon, was now "gone", and Harris was missing. Hall was not breathing bottled oxygen because his regulator was too choked with ice.

By 09:00, Hall had fixed his oxygen mask but indicated that his frostbitten hands and feet were making it difficult to traverse the fixed ropes. Later in the afternoon, he radioed Base Camp, asking them to call his pregnant wife, Jan Arnold, on the satellite phone. During this last communication, they chose a name for their unborn child, he reassured her that he was reasonably comfortable, and told her, "Sleep well, my sweetheart. Please don't worry too much." Shortly thereafter, he froze to death in his sleep. His body was found on 23 May by Ed Viesturs and fellow mountaineers from the IMAX expedition, but was left there as requested by his wife, who said she thought he was "where he'd liked to have stayed". The bodies of Doug Hansen and Andy Harris have never been found. Viesturs stated in the IMAX film that upon finding Hall's body, he sat down and cried beside his friend.

Later in the day, however, Weathers regained consciousness and walked alone under his own power to the camp, surprising everyone there, though he was suffering severe hypothermia and frostbite. Despite receiving oxygen and attempts to rewarm him, Weathers was practically abandoned again the next morning, 12 May, after a storm collapsed his tent overnight and the other survivors again thought he died. Krakauer discovered he was still conscious when the survivors in Camp IV prepared to evacuate. Despite his worsening condition, Weathers could still move mostly under his own power. A rescue team mobilized, hopeful of getting Weathers down the mountain alive. Over the next two days, Weathers was ushered down to Camp II with the assistance of eight healthy climbers from various expeditions and evacuated by a daring high-altitude helicopter rescue, one of the highest ever attempted. He survived and eventually recovered, but lost his nose, right hand, half his right forearm, and the fingers on his left hand to frostbite.

The climbing Sherpas located Fischer and Gau on 11 May, but Fischer's condition had deteriorated so much that they were only able to give him palliative care before rescuing Gau. Boukreev made a subsequent rescue attempt but found Fischer's frozen body at around 19:00. Like Weathers, Gau was evacuated by helicopter.

== Causes of the disaster ==
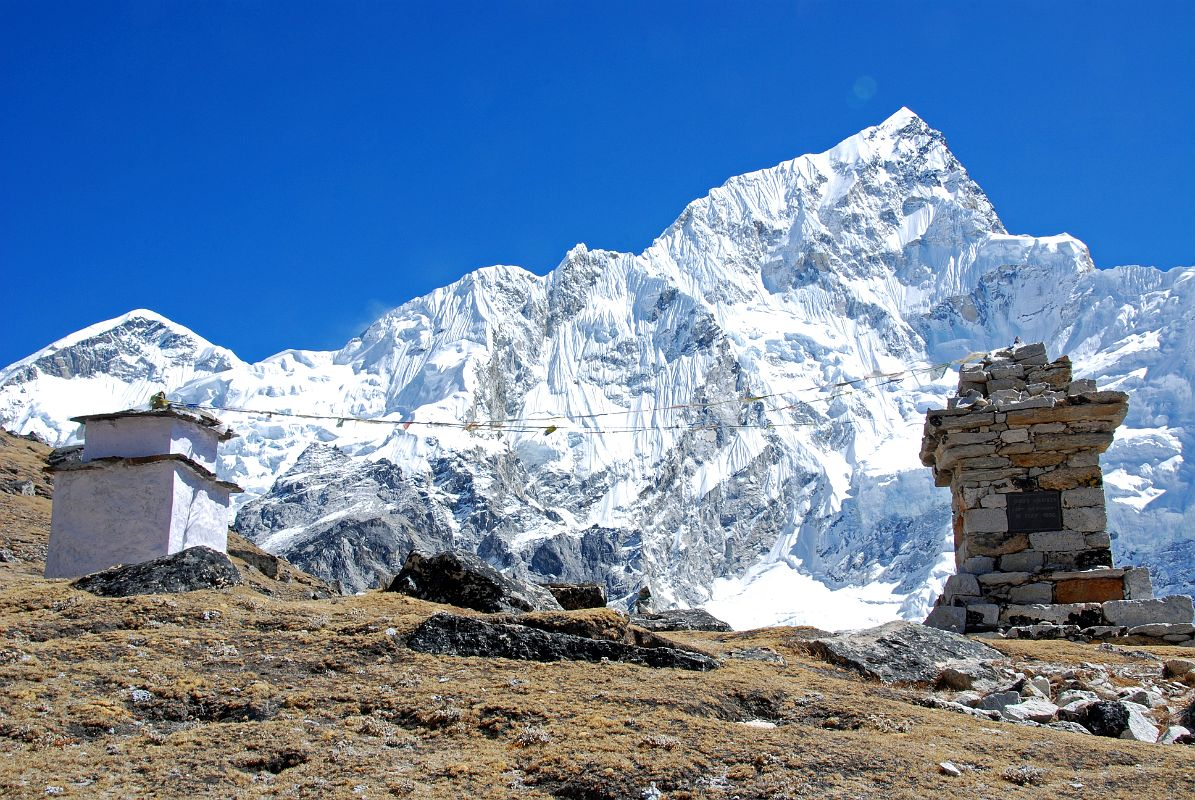
A memorial chorten for Rob Hall, Andy Harris, Doug Hansen, and Yasuko Namba

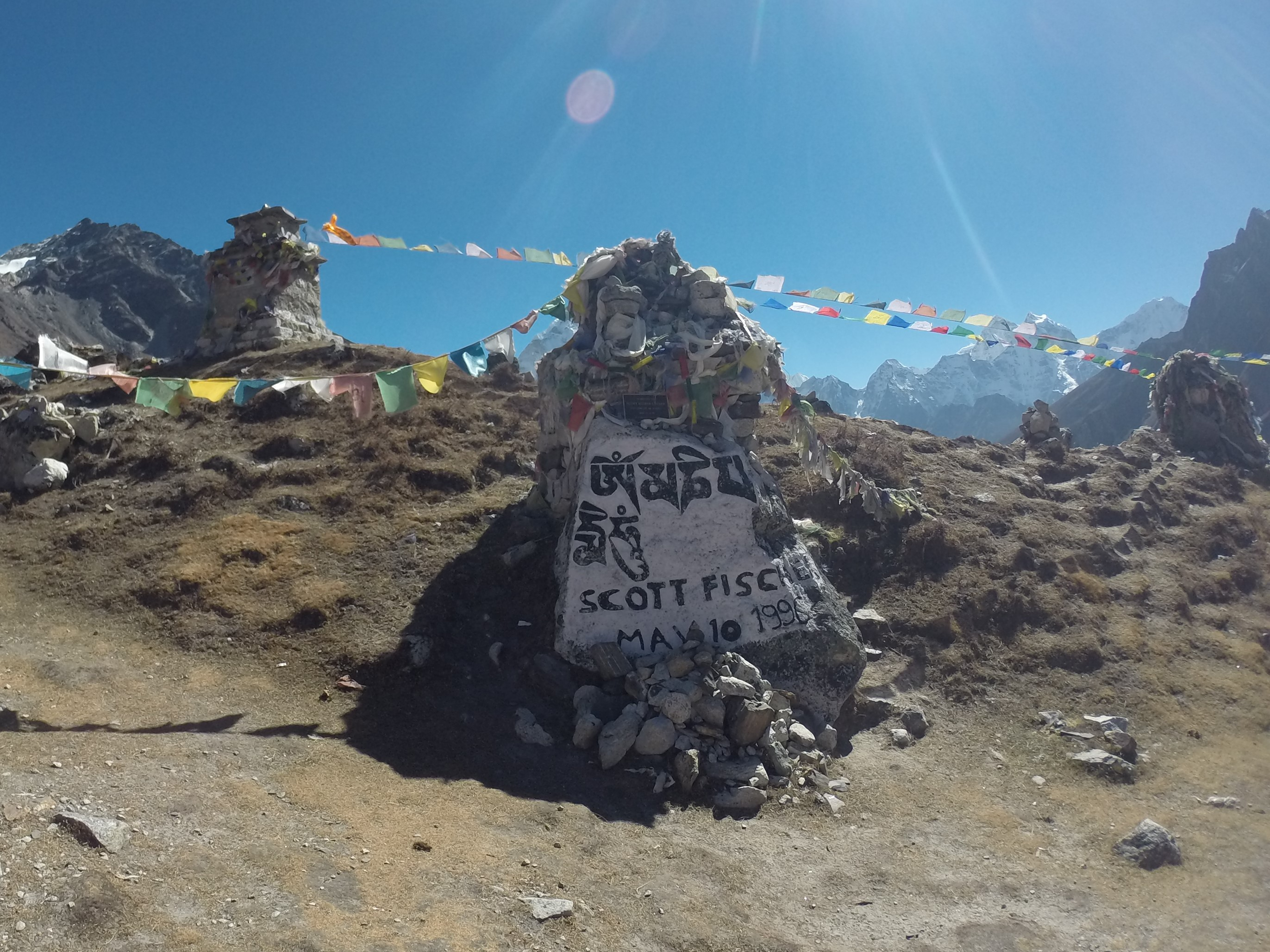
A memorial to Scott Fischer

The disaster was caused by a combination of events:

- Weather was the primary cause of the disaster. Evidence suggests that the storm starting in the afternoon of 10 May produced temperatures near the summit of Everest of about −30 °C (−22 °F) and wind speeds exceeding 20 meters per second or 45 miles per hour. That converts into a wind chill factor of at least −51 °C (−60 °F) which can cause frostbite to bare skin in two to five minutes. Some climbers and authors have claimed an even colder wind chill factor. Blowing snow reduced visibility to a few metres and the ability to hear and communicate.
- Ineffective leadership.
  - The team leaders and guides did not enforce a turnaround time of 2:00 p.m. Many climbers summitted after 2:00 which, even if the weather had been good, did not give them sufficient time to descend to the relative safety of the South Col and Camp IV before darkness which occurred about 6:45 p.m.
  - The expedition leaders did not believe that the blizzard, which hit in full force on 11 May, would be preceded by falling temperatures, increasing snowfall, and heavy winds through the late afternoon and evening of 10 May.
  - A rivalry between Hall and Fischer, who were incentivized for business reasons to get their clients to the summit, leading them to ignore the aforementioned weather forecasts and turnaround times. Moreover, two journalists were on their teams, Jon Krakauer with Hall and Sandy Hill Pittman with Fischer. Their presence put additional pressure on Hall and Fischer to try to assure a successful climb.
  - Hall and Fischer anticipated a round trip time of not more than eighteen hours from the South Col to the summit of Everest and back to the South Col and allocated three bottles of oxygen to each climber. Only one climber (guide Anatoli Boukreev) made the round trip in less than eighteen hours and all others ran out of oxygen which had the immediate consequences of altitude sickness, confusion, loss of energy, and frostbite.
- Bottlenecks at the Balcony and Hillary Step which caused a two hour delay in summiting. The delays were caused mostly by the failure of Hall's and Fischer's teams to secure fixed ropes beforehand, plus the slowness of some clients traversing these difficult spots and the number of people arriving at the bottlenecks at the same time. Thirty-three climbers were attempting to summit Everest on 10 May, the greatest one day total up until that time. Krakauer suggested that the commercialization of climbing Everest allowed otherwise unqualifed climbers to attempt to summit leading to dangerous situations.
- Anatoli Boukreev, Scott Fischer's Kazakh–Russian guide, rescued three climbers during the height of the storm on Everest, but Jon Krakauer and others criticized him. Krakauer said, "There is a world of difference between being a brilliant climber and an able guide." A 1998 article in Salon magazine said: "A guide should, in general, remain with his clients; and Boukreev's failure to carry oxygen made it extremely difficult for him to do that. If Boukreev had carried oxygen, he would likely not have been forced to descend early, and might have been able to save more climbers." Boukreev's defense of himself, detailed below, was that with his experience it was safer not to use oxygen because running out of oxygen would cause a sudden shock to the body.

=== Discussion ===
With regard to the turnaround time, neither Hall nor Fischer was at the summit at 2:00 p.m. It's not clear whether the other guides would have been effective had they attempted to enforce the deadline.

It's very difficult to turn someone around high on the mountain. If a client sees that the summit is close and they're dead-set on getting there, they're going to laugh in your face and keep going.

— Guy Cotter

Krakauer suggested several measures that might be attempted to prevent future tragedies such as that of 1996, but was pessimistic that the death toll could be decreased. He pointed out that climbing Everest is a dangerous endeavor with a fatality rate in 1996 and previous years of three percent for climbers who go above the relatively low elevation of base camp at 5,300 m (17,400 ft). The fatalities include a large number of elite climbers as well as novices. He noted that "lucid thought is all but impossible at 29,000 feet."

Adding to the high-altitude problem of oxygen shortage, Kent Moore, a physicist, and John L. Semple, a surgeon, both researchers from the University of Toronto, in May 2004, told New Scientist magazine that an analysis of the weather conditions on 11 May suggested that atmospheric oxygen levels fell by an additional 6% as a result of the storm, resulting in a further 14% reduction in oxygen uptake.

==== Supplementary oxygen ====
Following the disaster, the use and non-use of supplementary oxygen was the focus of much discussion and analysis, with Boukreev and Sherpa leader Lopsang criticized by Krakauer for not using supplementary oxygen while performing guide duties. Both men gave detailed written explanations as to why they preferred not to use oxygen; both men did in fact carry a bottle on the summit day that could be used if needed in an emergency or extraordinary situation. In his book The Climb, Boukreev shared this explanation with Mark Bryant, the editor of Outside magazine:

Also, Mr. Krakauer raised a question about my climbing without oxygen and suggested that perhaps my effectiveness was compromised by that decision. In the history of my career, as I have detailed above, it has been my practice to climb without supplementary oxygen. In my experience, it is safer for me, once acclimatized, to climb without oxygen in order to avoid the sudden loss of acclimatization that occurs when supplementary oxygen supplies are depleted.

My particular physiology, my years of high-altitude climbing, my discipline, the commitment I make to proper acclimatization, and the knowledge I have of my own capacities have always made me comfortable with this choice. And, Scott Fischer was comfortable with that choice as well. He authorized me to climb without supplementary oxygen.

To this I would add: As a precautionary measure, in the event that some extraordinary demand was placed upon me on summit day, I was carrying one (1) bottle of supplementary oxygen, a mask, and a regulator.

Beidleman said that Boukreev had brought oxygen to the Balcony but declined to use it, handing the bottle to Beidleman and stating he had “no need.” This contradicted the original plan and Fischer’s directive that guides use oxygen while supporting clients according to Beidleman. While acknowledging Boukreev’s strength and speed as a climber, Beidleman argued that going without oxygen impaired Boukreev’s ability to assist others down from the summit. He suggested that Boukreev didn’t fully recognize his responsibility as a commercial guide, noting the consequences of prioritizing personal style over team safety.

=== Radios ===
There were several issues and problems with radios and their use on summit day. Scott Fischer's Sardar did not have a company-issued radio, but did have a "small yellow" radio that was owned by Sandy Pittman. Rob Hall's team also had an issue with a radio during a discussion over oxygen bottles that caused confusion. Ian Woodall, the leader of a South African team at the South Col, refused to let other groups use his radio after their batteries were depleted during the storm.

== The 1996 season after this disaster ==
When Into Thin Air was published in 1997, it included the claim that the fatality rates on Everest in the 1996 season were lower than average. Based on the data available in The Himalayan Database at that time, Krakauer calculated that the increased volume of climbers in 1996 compared with previous years appeared to cause the fatality rates on Everest to drop considerably, meaning that 1996 was statistically a safer-than-average year. However, further analysis on the updated data in the Himalayan Database in 2025 showed that 1996 was actually "an extremely deadly year" on Everest. Krakauer promised to update this error in any future versions of Into Thin Air.

== List of fatalities ==
Name	Nationality	Expedition	Location of death	Cause of death
Andrew "Harold" Harris (Guide)	New Zealand	Adventure Consultants	near South Summit, 8,749 m	Unknown; presumed as falling during descent near summit
Doug Hansen (Client)	United States	Adventure Consultants	near South Summit, 8,749 m	Unknown; presumed as falling during descent near summit
Rob Hall (Guide/Expedition leader)	New Zealand	Adventure Consultants	near South Summit, 8,749 m	Exposure
Yasuko Namba (Client)	Japan	Adventure Consultants	South Col, c. 7,900 m	Exposure
Scott Fischer (Guide/Expedition leader)	United States	Mountain Madness	Southeast Ridge, 8,300 m	Exposure
Subedar Tsewang Smanla	India	Indo-Tibetan Border Police	Northeast Ridge, 8,600 m	Exposure
Lance Naik Dorje Morup	India	Indo-Tibetan Border Police	Northeast Ridge, 8,600 m	Exposure
Head Constable Tsewang Paljor	India	Indo-Tibetan Border Police	Northeast Ridge, 8,600 m	Exposure

=== Other fatalities in 1996 ===
The following is a list of the other fatalities during the spring 1996 climbing season on Everest. These deaths were not directly related to the storm or the events of 10–11 May 1996 Everest disaster.

- 9 May – Chen Yu-Nan (陳玉男) – from the Taiwanese National Expedition, died after a fall down the Lhotse Face
- 19 May – Reinhard Wlasich – Austrian climber, died from a combination of HAPE and HACE at 8,300 m (27,200 ft) on the Northeast Ridge
- 25 May – Bruce Herrod – photojournalist with a South African team, was on the South Col during the 10–11 May storm and reached the summit two weeks later, but died descending the Southeast Ridge
- 6 June – Ngawang Topche Sherpa – Nepali Sherpa for Mountain Madness, developed a severe case of HAPE on 22 April while working above Base Camp; died in June in a Kathmandu hospital

The following fatalities occurred on Everest during the fall 1996 climbing season.

- 25 September – Yves Bouchon – French climber, died in an avalanche at 7,800 m (25,600 ft) on the southeast route below Camp IV, along with the two Sherpas listed below
- 25 September – Lopsang Jangbu Sherpa – Nepalese Sherpa, the same climbing Sardar on the Mountain Madness expedition involved in the May 1996 Everest disaster; died in avalanche
- 25 September – Dawa Sherpa – Nepalese Sherpa; died in avalanche

In the epilogue to High Exposure, David Breashears describes encountering some of the bodies upon climbing Everest again in May 1997.

== In the media ==
- Jon Krakauer's book Into Thin Air: A Personal Account of the Mt. Everest Disaster (1997).
- Into Thin Air: Death on Everest (released 9 November 1997) is a made-for-TV movie based on Krakauer's book, directed by Robert Markowitz and written by Robert J. Avrech.
- The Climb is Anatoli Boukreev's account of the events that unfolded on the mountain, in part a response to Krakauer's 1997 book.
- Kenneth Kamler's book Doctor on Everest (2000), describes the 1996 incident, as Dr. Kamler was present on location at that time, and treated several victims of the accident.
- The IMAX film Everest (1998) documents the disaster, and the involvement of that film's crew and climbing team in the rescue effort.
- Lene Gammelgaard's book Climbing High: A Woman's Account of Surviving the Everest Tragedy (first published June 9, 1999).
- Beck Weathers' book Left for Dead: My Journey Home from Everest (2000).
- The Dark Side of Everest (2003), National Geographic Channel, discusses climbers' motivations, the ethics and challenges involved when climbers encounter trouble at high altitudes, and specific disasters, e.g. the 10–11 May 1996 Mount Everest disaster and Bruce Herrod's death on 25 May 1996.
- Remnants of Everest: The 1996 Tragedy (2007; released in the US as Storm over Everest and broadcast on the US PBS-TV series Frontline), is a documentary by director David Breashears), with music composed by Jocelyn Pook.
- Seconds from Disaster - Into the Death Zone, 2012 TV documentary.
- Lou Kasischke's book After the Wind: 1996 Everest Tragedy, One Survivor's Story (2014).
- The film Everest (2015), a biographical survival film based on the events of the disaster.
- Joby Talbot's opera Everest, based on the events of the disaster, was produced by the Dallas Opera and premiered in 2015.

== See also ==
- List of 20th-century summiteers of Mount Everest
- List of deaths on eight-thousanders
- List of media related to Mount Everest
- List of people who died climbing Mount Everest
- List of mountaineering disasters by death toll

== Bibliography ==
- Krakauer, Jon (1997). Into Thin Air: A Personal Account of the Mount Everest Disaster. Doubleday. ISBN 978-0-385-49208-9.
- Ratcliffe, Graham (2013). A day to die for : 1996 : Everest's worst disaster : one survivor's personal journey to uncover the truth. Edinburgh. ISBN 978-1-78057-641-1.
- Trueman, Mike (2015). The Storms: Adventure and Tragedy on Everest.
