= Gau Ming-ho =

Taiwanese mountaineer

Gau Ming-ho 高銘和
- Born: 1949 (age 76–77); Ruifang, Taipei County, Taiwan
- Occupation: Mountaineer

Gau Ming-Ho (Chinese: 高銘和; pinyin: Gāo Mínghé; born 1949), also known as Makalu Gau after the 5th highest peak in the world, is a Taiwanese mountaineer. He was a leader of a Taiwanese expedition to Mount Everest during the 1996 Mount Everest disaster.

== Early life ==
Gau was born in 1949 in Ruifang District, Taipei County (now New Taipei City). His hometown is in a mountainous area, and so he became interested in hiking and mountain photography. He made his first trip to Tibet in 1991, and thereafter climbed more than 100 mountains in mainland China.

== 1995 Mount McKinley ==
Gau led an expedition of seven climbers, where one died and he and other climbers needed to be rescued by helicopter.

== 1996 Mount Everest disaster ==
On 10 May 1996, Gau reached the summit of Everest alongside the members of the Mountain Madness and Adventure Consultants expeditions. Like many climbers that day, Gau reached the summit an hour after the planned 2 pm turn-around time and was caught in the blizzard that eventually claimed the lives of eight other climbers. Suffering from exhaustion and with his oxygen supply depleted, Gau was unable to continue down the mountain, and was left in the open with Lopsang Jangbu Sherpa and Mountain Madness Expedition leader Scott Fischer, who was also in physical distress. Lopsang eventually descended on his own to find help, leaving Gau and Fischer lying a few yards apart from each other. Sherpas found the two men the next day, but Fischer was too far gone to save, so they concentrated on rescuing Gau, managing to bring him back to Camp IV. Fischer eventually died on the mountain; his body was found by his climbing partner Anatoli Boukreev, and remains on Everest to this day.

Gau and Adventure Consultants climber Beck Weathers, who had also survived a night of exposure on the mountain, were escorted down to Camp II with the help of other expedition teams, and both men were evacuated in one of the highest altitude helicopter rescues on Everest. Weathers gave up his seat so Gau could be evacuated first. Gau lost all his fingers of both hands, toes and his nose to frostbite.

== Later Activity ==
Gau has continued climbing, and in 2007 returned to Everest as a team leader.

== Works ==
- 《一座山的勇氣》. 寶瓶文化事業有限公司 [Aquarius Publishing Company]. 2009. ISBN 9789866745775.
