= Lopsang Jangbu Sherpa =

Sherpa (1971–1996)

Lopsang Jangbu Sherpa (May 5, 1971 – September 25, 1996) was a Nepalese Sherpa mountaineering guide, climber and porter, best known for his work as the climbing Sirdar for Scott Fischer's Mountain Madness expedition to Everest in Spring 1996, when a freak storm led to the deaths of eight climbers from several expeditions, considered one of the worst disasters in the history of Everest mountaineering. Notwithstanding controversy over his actions during that expedition, Lopsang was well-regarded in the mountaineering community, having summited Everest four times. Lopsang was killed in an avalanche in September 1996, while again on an expedition to climb Everest for what would have been a fifth ascent.

== Mountaineering achievements ==
Beyond his work in the course of the ill-fated Spring 1996 Everest expedition, Lopsang was a respected porter and guide with extensive Himalayan mountaineering experience, including:

- Summit, Mount Everest with Nepali Women's expedition, Spring 1993
- Summit, Cho Oyu with Japanese expedition, Fall 1993
- Camp 4, Mount Everest, Japanese expedition, Winter 1993
- Summit, Mount Everest, Sagarmatha Environmental expedition, Spring 1994
- Summit, Mount Everest, New Zealand expedition, Spring 1995, led by Rob Hall
- Summit, Broad Peak, Scott Fischer party, Summer 1995
- Summit, Mount Everest, Scott Fischer party, Spring 1996 (3 hours on the summit)

Lopsang reached the summit of Everest four times in four years, all without supplementary oxygen. During his career, Lopsang had worked as a climber and guide for both Rob Hall and Scott Fischer, two expedition leaders who ultimately died on Everest in the course of the 10 May 1996 tragedy.

== Spring 1996 Everest disaster ==
By 1996, Lopsang had developed a reputation as a strong climber and capable guide, in part by his experience in helping to guide several successful expeditions with Rob Hall, a significant Himalayan expedition leader. Scott Fischer, another recognised Himalayan expedition leader, had established a new venture, Mountain Madness, and was planning a guided commercial expedition to Everest for spring 1996. Fischer, familiar with Lopsang's work and achievements, hired Lopsang to lead sherpas and assist clients as Sirdar for the Everest expedition.

During the spring and fall 1996 Everest climbing seasons, fifteen climbers died on the mountain, making it the deadliest single year in Everest history. Eight of them died on 11 May alone. The disaster gained wide publicity and raised questions about the commercialisation of Everest.

Journalist Jon Krakauer, on assignment from Outside magazine, was a member of one of the affected expeditions, and afterwards published the bestseller Into Thin Air, which related his experience. Anatoli Boukreev, a guide for Fischer's expedition whose actions were criticized somewhat by Krakauer, co-authored a rebuttal book called The Climb. The dispute sparked a debate within the climbing community as to the proper role of climbing guides on Everest, centering on the actions of the climbers and guides from the summit parties from these two expeditions, who climbed together during the final and fateful summit push.

In the course of this controversy, Lopsang's actions during that summit climb, as that of others, came under some degree of scrutiny. Prior to the summit assault on 10 May, he had carried an especially large load of equipment. Lopsang acknowledged that on the day of this fateful summit push, he suffered from vomiting and fatigue, which Krakauer described as symptoms of overexertion; but Lopsang explained "I have been over 8,000 meters many times, each time I vomit. It is just something I do. It means nothing. I have done it on all successful expeditions, when leading or following. I did it at camp I, II, etc. For me, it has nothing to do with altitude sickness." Krakauer points out in his book, however, that Lopsang has stated on record: "this year on summit day I am tired and sick because [the day before] I am carrying 80 pounds, maybe 75 pounds, from Camp III to Camp IV, I am carrying the team telephone. I am also very tired because [on summit day] I take up Sandy together on rope above Camp IV. I am too tired, I vomit".

Late in the day of 10 May, as bad weather closed in, Scott Fischer reached Lopsang, who was waiting for him near the summit. Fischer and Lopsang started their descent in bad weather, as Rob Hall and Doug Hansen ascended toward the summit. Lopsang sent Fischer down the mountain and waited for Hall and Hansen to complete the summit. Lopsang reported that after ensuring that Hall and Hansen had safely summited and started their descent, he quickly descended to reach Fischer, apparently then in some difficulty. Lopsang then "physically dragged" an ill Fischer from the South Summit "until he could go no further", and waited together with him and Makalu Gau (a climber from another expedition also caught in the storm) for several hours, until Fischer finally urged Lopsang to leave and descend alone. Gau ultimately was rescued by other Sherpas; Fischer showing signs of hypothermia with no mittens on or coat zipped apparently moved no further before he died high on Everest.

Lopsang's uncle, Ngawang Topche Sherpa, also working on the 1996 Mountain Madness expedition, fell ill and was evacuated by helicopter from Everest just prior to the fateful summit bid, suffering from a severe case of high altitude pulmonary edema (HAPE) and tuberculosis complication. Hospitalised, Ngawang remained incapacitated in Kathmandu, never recovered, and eventually died on 6 June.

== September 1996 expedition ==
In the fall of 1996, Lopsang returned to Everest as a guide, working for a Japanese expedition. On 25 September 1996, a large avalanche erupted during the ascent on the southeast ridge route in the area between Camp III at the top of the Lhotse face, and Camp IV at the South Col, the starting point for the final summit push. The avalanche killed Lopsang, sherpa guide Dawa and a French climber, Yves Bouchon.

== Personal life ==
Lopsang came from Beding, Nepal. He was married, with a child aged five months old, at the time of his death.

== See also ==
- List of Mount Everest summiters by number of times to the summit
- List of people who died climbing Mount Everest
- Ang Dorje
- Timeline of the 1996 Mount Everest disaster
