= Charlotte Fox (mountaineer) =

American mountaineer (1957–2018)

- Born: May 10, 1957; Greensboro, North Carolina, U.S.
- Died: May 24, 2018 (aged 61); Telluride, Colorado, U.S.
- Known for: First American woman to reach the summit of seven eight thousanders; survivor of the 1996 Mount Everest disaster
- Spouse: Reese Martin III

Charlotte Conant Fox (May 10, 1957 – May 24, 2018) was an American mountaineer and the first American woman to reach the summit of seven eight thousanders. She survived the 1996 Mount Everest disaster as a member of Scott Fischer's Mountain Madness expedition.

== Personal life ==
Born in Greensboro, North Carolina on May 10, 1957, Charlotte Conant Fox was the daughter of Jared Fox and Ann Robinson Black. She described her upbringing as that of a "southern debutante." A graduate of St. Catherine's School in Richmond, Virginia and then of Hollins University in Roanoke, Virginia. In 1979 after college, she relocated to Colorado and later married Reese Martin III, who died in 2004.

She died of head injuries on May 24, 2018, after falling over a stairway railing at her house.

== Climbing career ==
Fox was the "first American woman to climb three mountains at altitudes of 8,000 meters or higher", according to The Washington Post, who also said that Fox was "the first American woman to summit the 8,000-meter Gasherbrum II in Pakistan in 1994 — which Fox once said in an interview with Rock and Ice was her most important expedition — and then Cho Oyu in 1995." According to the American Alpine Club, Fox "climbed all 54 of Colorado’s 14ers, involving all kinds of terrain and weather," as well as the Seven Summits worldwide. Her summit list included:

- Aconcagua, Argentina
- Gasherbrum II, Pakistan (1994)
- Cho Oyu (1995)
- Mount Everest (1996)
- Denali, Alaska, United States
- Lhotse, Nepal (2010)
- K2, Pakistan (2014)
- Nanga Parbat, Pakistan (2016)
- Kangchenjunga, India (2017)
- Mont Blanc
- Mount Elbrus, Russia
- Mount Kilimanjaro, Tanzania
- Mount Kosciuszko, New South Wales, Australia
- Puncak Jaya, New Guinea
- Vinson Massif, Antarctica

== Charitable and public service activities ==
- Fox spent twenty-four years as a member of the Ski Patrol in Aspen, Colorado before relocating to Telluride, Colorado, circa 2007.
- American Alpine Club (board of directors)
- The Access Fund (board of directors)
