= Lene Gammelgaard =

Danish mountaineer, author, and motivational speaker

- Born: 18 December 1961 (age 64); Copenhagen, Denmark
- Occupations: Mountaineer, author, motivational speaker
- Years active: 1981–present
- Website: LeneGammelgaard.com

Lene Gammelgaard (born 18 December 1961) is a Danish climber, author, and motivational speaker. Gammelgaard is the 35th woman, and first Scandinavian woman, to climb Mount Everest, reaching the summit via the South East Ridge on 10 May 1996, as part of Scott Fischer's expedition. Her book Climbing High (1998) recounts the 1996 Everest disaster when a storm took the lives of Fischer, Rob Hall, and six other climbers. Her book sold over 1 million copies and was translated into 13 languages. Gammelgaard was portrayed in the 2015 film Everest by actress Charlotte Bøving.

== See also ==
- List of 20th-century summiters of Mount Everest
- List of Mount Everest records
- Timeline of the 1996 Mount Everest disaster
