= Ang Dorje Sherpa =

Nepalese sherpa (born 1970)

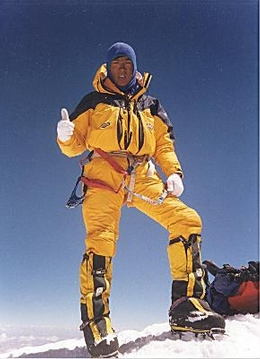

Personal information
- Nationality: Nepalese
- Born: 1970 (age 55–56) Pangboche, Nepal
- Children: 2

Climbing career
- Type of climber: Mountaineer
- Major ascents: Everest summit: 25 Cho Oyu summit: 7 Ama Dablam summit: 10 Aconcagua summit: 3 Broad Peak summit: 1 Kilimanjaro summit: 4 Gasherbrum II summit: 1 Makalu summit: 1

Ang Dorje (Chhuldim) Sherpa (born 1970) is a Nepalese Sherpa mountaineering guide, climber, and porter from Pangboche, Nepal, who has reached the summit of Mount Everest 25 times. He was the climbing Sirdar for Rob Hall's Adventure Consultants expedition to Everest in spring 1996, when a freak storm led to the deaths of eight climbers from several expeditions, considered one of the worst disasters in the history of Everest mountaineering.

== Early life ==
Ang Dorje was born in 1970, in upper Pangboche, Nepal, near the Khumbu Valley as it passes down the slopes of Mount Everest. He grew up among Himalayan climbers; his father, Nima Tenzing Sherpa, was a climber with expeditions led by British mountaineer Chris Bonington in the 1970s and 1980s.

He followed his father in work with climbing expeditions beginning as a porter at the age of 12. "I always wanted to climb when I was little," Ang Dorje said. He attended private school in Nepal, with assistance from western clients impressed by his work ethic, as he continued his mountaineering work with several expeditions in the Everest area. His efforts were rewarded when in 1992 at the age of 22 he reached the summit of Mount Everest.

== Sirdar and guiding career ==
Ang Dorje has led many successful expeditions on Everest, frequently as climbing sirdar for Adventure Consultants, the guiding service founded by Rob Hall. During the disastrous 1996 expedition on Everest, he and Lhakpa Tshering Sherpa attempted to rescue Hall and others in the deadly storm conditions that ultimately killed 8 climbers. They ascended 900 vertical meters to just below Everest's South Summit, only to be halted by impenetrable storm conditions just 100 meters from Hall. They waited 45 minutes before being forced back by the storm. Ang Dorje later commented on the incident saying, "It was very sad. Very difficult." The rescue efforts were recounted by Jon Krakauer in his account of the disaster, Into Thin Air.

In addition to his work as climbing sirdar on Everest, Ang Dorje has also worked as a mountain guide on Everest, as well as Aconcagua, Mount Rainier, Kilimanjaro, and Island Peak.

== Climbing accomplishments ==
As of 2026, Ang Dorje has reached the summit of Mount Everest 25 times since 1992 (in both spring and autumn, all via the South Col route), Cho Oyu seven times since 1995, and has also summited Broad Peak (1995), Gasherbrum II (1997), and Ama Dablam (in 1996, via the southwest ridge route).

== Personal life ==
After meeting American computational linguist Michelle Gregory at the southern Everest Base Camp, in 2002 he immigrated to the United States. The couple married a year later. He returns to climb Everest each spring, in part to visit his family. He completed his 19th summit of Everest in 2017. Ang Dorje also works as a wind turbine mechanic at wind farms in the Pacific Northwest region of the United States.

== Everest summits ==
- 2026 – 25th summit
- 2025 – 24th summit
- 2024 – 23rd summit
- 2023 – 22nd summit
- 2021 – 21st summit
- 2019 – 20th summit
- 2017 – 19th summit
- 2016 – 18th summit with Adventure Consultants
- 2013 – 17th summit
- 2008 – 14th summit
- 1992 – 1st summit

== See also ==
- List of Mount Everest summiters by frequency
- Timeline of the 1996 Mount Everest disaster
