= Michael Groom (climber) =

Australian mountain climber (born 1959)

Michael Graeme Groom OAM (born 1959) is an Australian mountaineer. In 1995, Groom became the fourth person ever to reach the summits of the five highest peaks in the world (Makalu, Lhotse, Kangchenjunga, K2 and Everest) without using bottled oxygen. In 1987 he lost the front third of his feet to frostbite after descending from the summit of Kangchenjunga. Despite this, he managed to summit Mount Everest in 1993 and again in 1996. He has also completed the Seven Summits (highest mountains on each of the seven continents).

Groom acted as a guide for Adventure Consultants during the 1996 Mount Everest disaster, which he survived and subsequently described in his 1997 autobiography. In the 2015 film Everest, Groom was portrayed by actor Tom Wright.

In the 2000 Australia Day Honours Groom was awarded the Medal of the Order of Australia (OAM) for "service to mountaineering".

== Mountains climbed ==
Eight-thousanders

1987 – Kangchenjunga (8,586 m)

1993 and 1996 – Mount Everest (8,848 m)

1994 – Lhotse (8,516 m)

1995 – K2 (8,611 m)

1999 – Makalu (8,463 m)

Seven Summits

1983 – Mount Kosciuszko (2,228 m)

1983 – Kilimanjaro (5,895 m)

1984 – Mont Blanc (4,810 m)

1985 – Elbrus (5,642 m)

1985 – Aconcagua (6,961 m)

1986 – Denali (6,190 m)

1990 – Vinson Massif (4,892 m)

1993 and 1996 – Mount Everest (8,848 m)

1998 – Puncak Jaya (4,884 m)

== Bibliography ==
- Sheer Will: The Inspiring Life and Climbs of Michael Groom. An Autobiography 1997 Random House Australia ISBN 0-09-183623-9

== See also ==
- List of people with surname Groom
- List of Mount Everest summiters by number of times to the summit
- List of Mount Everest guides
- Timeline of the 1996 Mount Everest disaster
