= Sardar (Sherpa) =

Type of Sherpa mountain guide

A Sardar or Sirdar is a Sherpa mountain guide who manages all the other Sherpas in a climbing expedition or trekking group; Sirdar is the most common spelling used in the majority of English-language mountaineering literature although in some of the earlier literature it was spelt sardar. The Sirdar is typically the most experienced guide and can usually speak English fluently. The Sirdar's responsibilities include:

- assigning responsibilities to the other guides
- hiring and paying local porters
- purchasing local food during the trek/expedition
- making the final decision regarding route choices
- handling other trip logistics such as dealing with government officials or police.
- managing and overseeing transport of equipment to high camps

The normal progression to Sirdar usually involves starting as a porter, working their way up to being a kitchen assistant, on to an assistant guide and then finally to Sirdar. Sirdars do not normally carry loads but will do so on occasion such as carrying the pack of a client who is having difficulties from altitude sickness. The appellation is sometimes qualified with expeditions having an overall Sirdar but with other individuals in subsidiary roles such as base-camp sirdar and ice-fall sirdar.

== See also ==
- List of Mount Everest guides
