= Adventure Consultants =

Adventure travel company

Adventure Consultants, Ltd.
- Formerly: Hall and Ball Adventure Consultants
- Type: Limited
- Industry: Adventure travel
- Founded: 1991 in Christchurch, New Zealand
- Founders: Rob Hall; Gary Ball
- Headquarters: Lake Hāwea, New Zealand
- Areas served: Himalayas; Antarctica; Arctic; South America; Seven Summits; New Zealand; Europe
- Key people: Guy Cotter (CEO)
- Services: Treks; Wilderness journeys; Mountaineering guiding; Climbing schools
- Website: adventureconsultants.com

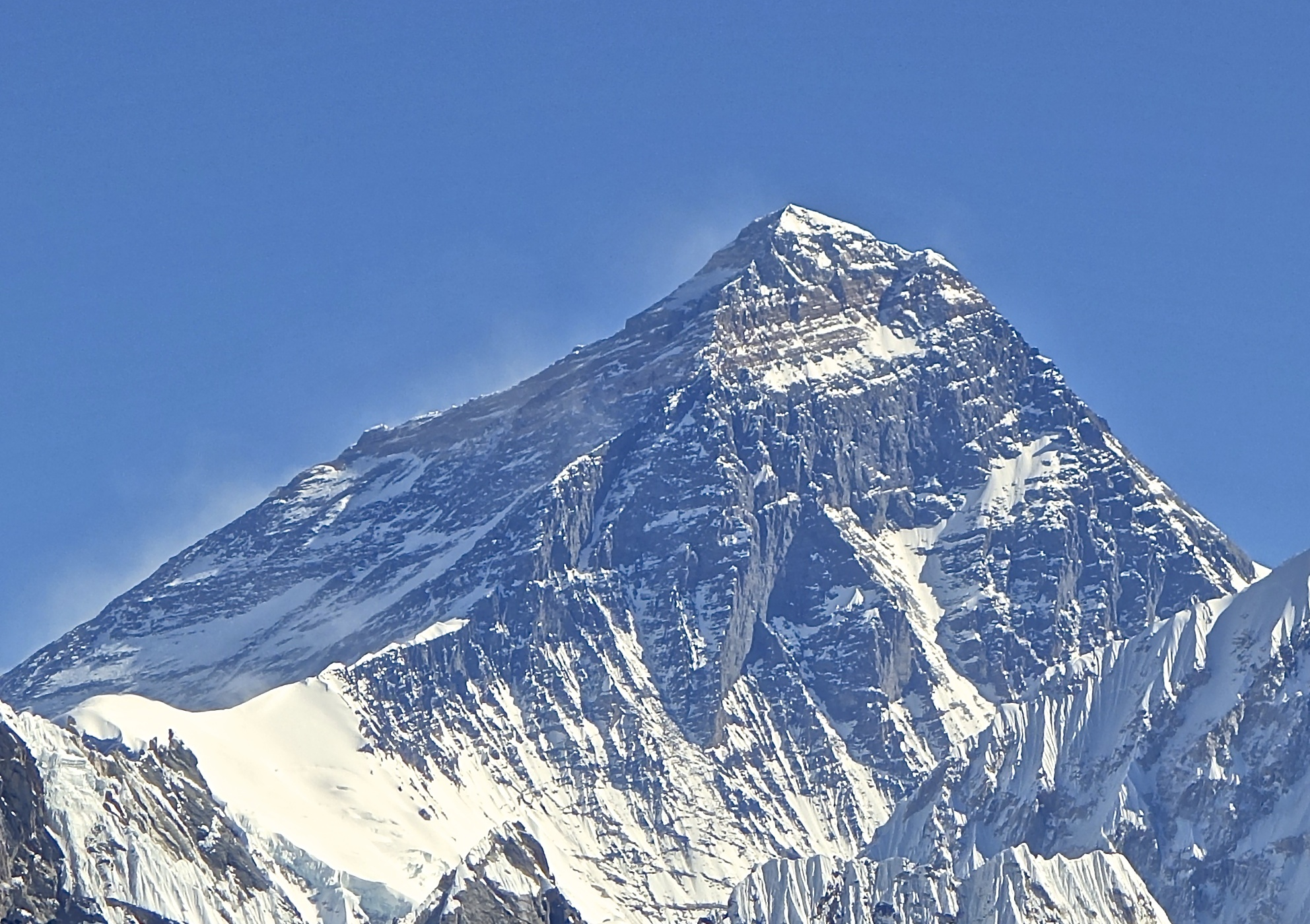
Everest's peak from Gokyo Ri

Adventure Consultants, formerly Hall and Ball Adventure Consultants, is a New Zealand-based adventure company that brings trekking and climbing groups to various locations. Founded by Rob Hall and Gary Ball in 1991, it helped pioneer the commercialisation of Mount Everest, During its 1996 Mount Everest climb eight people died, including Hall, a guide, and two Adventure Consultant clients.

Prior to starting Adventure Consultants, Hall and Ball climbed the Seven Summits in a seven-month time frame. Heavily covered by the media, they became celebrities in New Zealand. They undertook 47 expeditions together; their friendship was noted in the mountaineering world.

Following the deaths of Ball and Hall, the company was purchased by Guy Cotter, who continued to operate the business.

== History ==
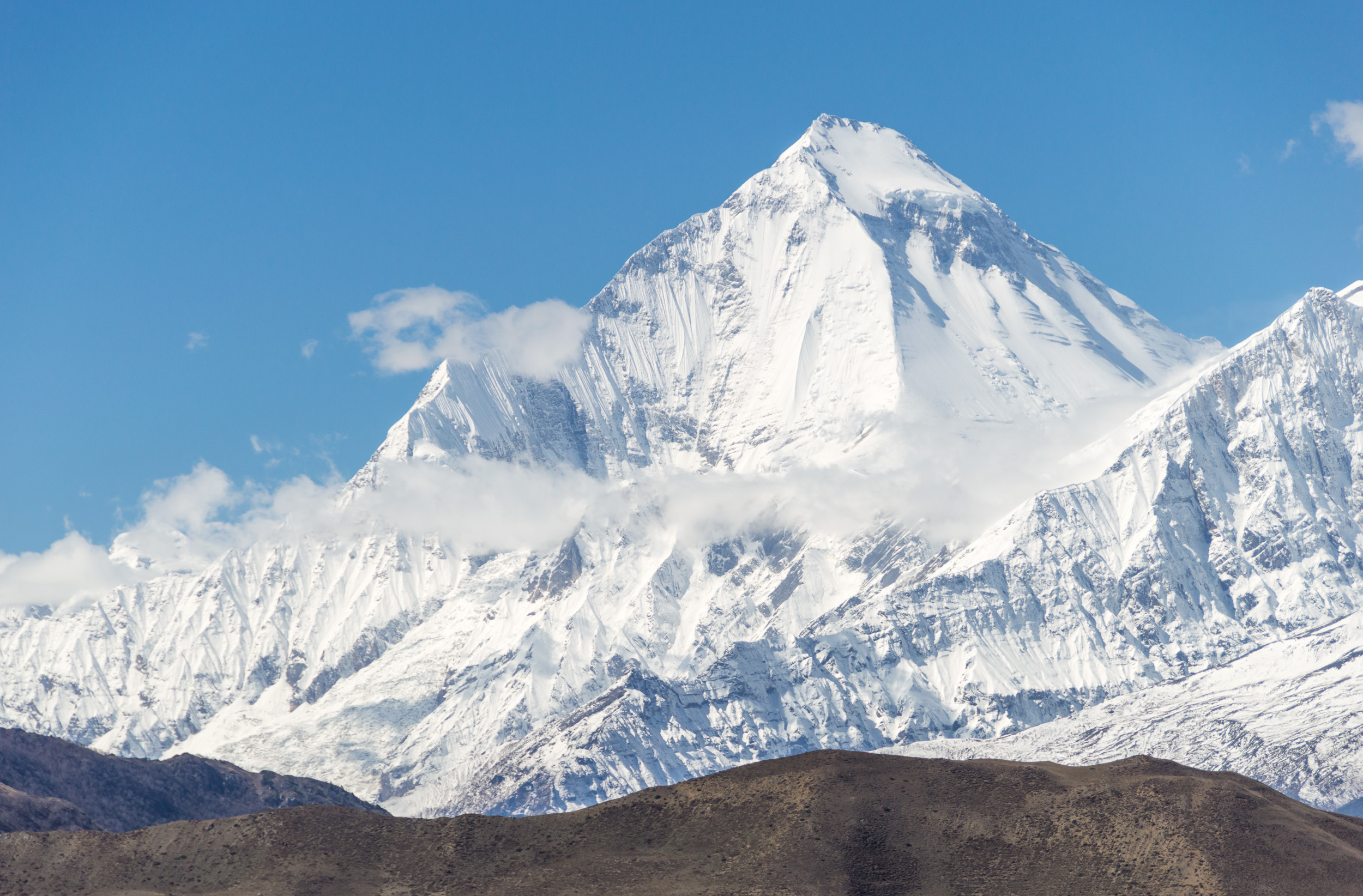
Dhaulagiri is also in the Himalayas and peaks at 8,167 m (26,795 ft)

Gary Ball and Rob Hall founded Adventure Consultants in 1991, while based in New Zealand. They were famous New Zealand climbers that got attention for offering commercial trips to Mount Everest's summit. However, Gary died in 1993, and Hall in 1996, leaving the company to Guy Cotter. By the time of Rob's death, Rob had led 39 people to the summit of Mount Everest.

Rob Hall's friend and climbing partner Gary Ball died in his arms on 8,167 m (26,795 ft) Dhaulagiri in October 1993. Ball had come down with a case of high-altitude pulmonary edema (HAPE) at six and a half kilometres altitude. Despite this loss, Hall went on to lead a highly successful expedition to Mount Everest in 1994 with Ed Viesturs. This was Hall's fourth summit of Everest. In 1995 Hall's expedition had to turn back because of bad weather as they neared the summit. In May 1996 Hall and a group of climbers made it to the summit of Mount Everest, but he and several other members of his party died on the way down. This event had a noted impact on media, appearing in various books and films. The disaster became very well known, with ten million people reading about it in the book Into Thin Air, written by Jon Krakauer (who was actually on the expedition) and hearing it referenced in a highly acclaimed IMAX film, shot during the same disastrous climbing season, although the filmmakers summited later in the season.

In 1996, Hall also employed two Sherpa people, Ang Dorje Sherpa and Ngawang Norbu Sherpa who managed to survive. (see also List of people who died climbing Mount Everest)

Despite the disaster in the spring 1996 and the death of Rob Hall, the company already had clients for a Cho Oyu expedition. Rather than cancel, Guy Cotter took over and successfully led the Cho Oyu expedition in the autumn of 1996.

The company guided a climb on the Matterhorn. Another peak they have offered guided climbs on is Carstensz Pyramid. The pyramid has noted difficulties that have to be navigated when getting to the mountain. One route is through jungle, although some have tried to go through a nearby mine only to be taken prisoner, caged in a metal box, and escaping only after paying a bribe.

By 2013 the company had led 19 expeditions to Mount Everest.

The company was contacted for information about hurt climbers during the 2015 Mount Everest avalanche, and they reported that people had been evacuated, including one Sherpa who was sent to Kathmandu Medical College. In the aftermath of the avalanche, Adventure Consultants worked to collect and donate to the victims of the disaster.

In the 2015 Avalanche, six Nepali employees died and another nine were injured. In response the company coordinated aid to both its employees and other aid organisations in Nepal (because of widespread damage from the 2015 Nepal earthquake). Some of the victims:

- Dawa Tsering Sherpa
- Pema Yishi Sherpa
- Chhimi Dawa Sherpa
- Pemba Sherpa
- Maila Rai

Also:

- Jangbu Sherpa— died of injuries night of 1 to 2 May 2015 at a Hospital in Kathmandu. The AC team attended his funeral days later noting, "..he will be greatly missed."

One of the charities set up by the company was the Adventure Consultants Sherpa Future Fund, which helps provide education and other benefits to the children of those killed.

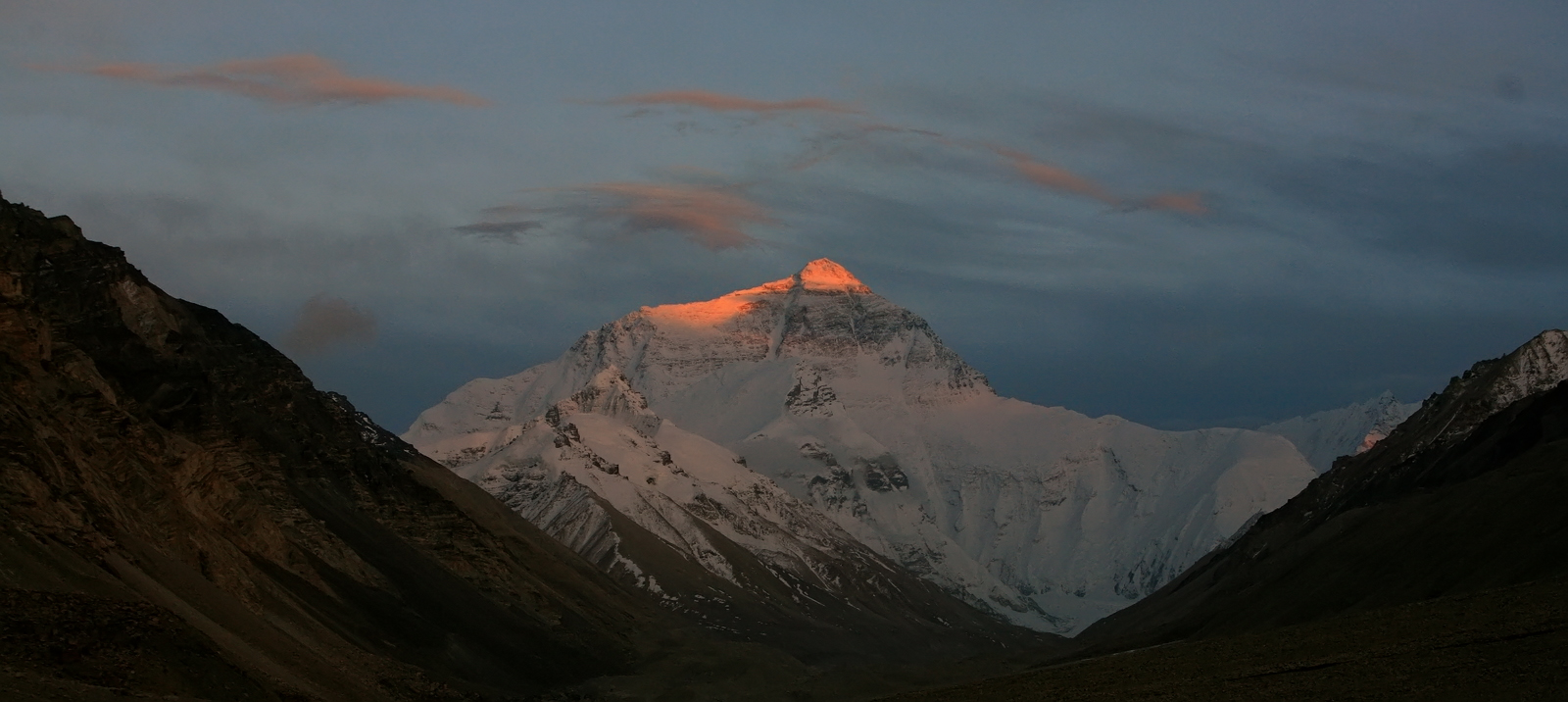
Sunset rays light up the peak of Everest's North face

== See also ==
- List of Mount Everest guides
- List of people who died climbing Mount Everest
- Himex
- Asian Trekking
- Mountain Madness
- Timeline of the 1996 Mount Everest disaster
