= List of Mount Everest death statistics =

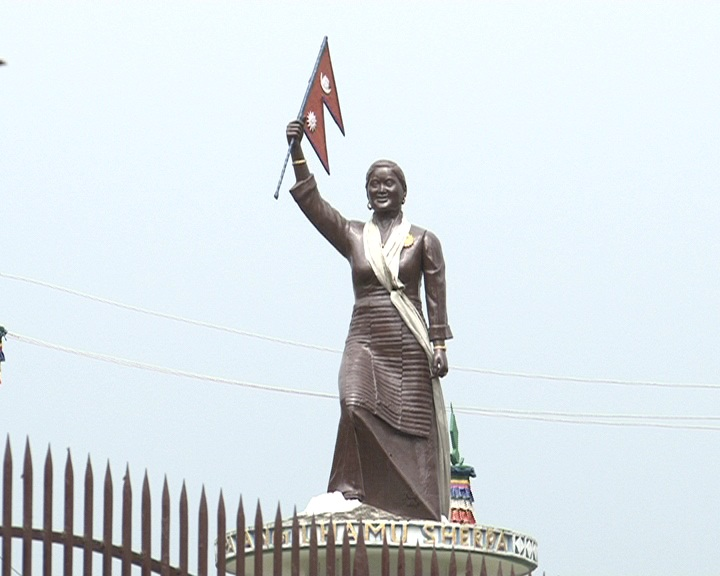
Statue honoring the woman Pasang Lhamu Sherpa, the first Nepali woman to summit but did not make it down alive

List of Mount Everest death statistics is a list of statistics about death on Mount Everest.

== Death extremes ==
=== Youngest people to die on Mount Everest ===
Examples of known cases

- Rahul Panchal (Ghabus), April 25, 2015, 19
- Ang Chuldim, August 31, 1982, 20
- Lobsang Sherpa, May 7, 2013, 22
- Víctor Hugo Trujillo, August 16, 1986, 22
- Michael Matthews, May 13, 1999, 22
- Andrew Irvine, June 9, 1924, 22
- Marco Siffredi, September 8, 2002, 23
- Himanshu Kapoor, April 25, 2015, 29

=== Oldest people to die on Mount Everest ===
- Min Bahadur Sherchan, May 5, 2017, 85
- Shailendra Kumar Upadhyay, May 9, 2011, 82
- Nils Antezana, May 18, 2004, 69
- Jonathan Sugarman, May 1, 2023, 69
- Karl Gordon Henize, October 5, 1993, 66
- Ernst Landgraf, May 23, 2019, 65

=== Deaths by nationality ===
Nationality	Count
Australia	8
Austria	3
Bangladesh	1
Belgium	1
Brazil	1
Bulgaria	3
Canada	6
Chile	1
China	12
Czechoslovakia/Czech Republic	7
Denmark	2
France	6
Germany	7
Hungary	3
India	24
Ireland	3
Italy	3
Japan	19
Kenya	1
Moldova	1
Malaysia	2
Nepal	124
Netherlands	1
New Zealand	3
North Macedonia	1
Poland	7
Russia	8
South Korea	11
Spain	4
Switzerland	3
Singapore	1
Slovakia	1
Slovenia	1
Sweden	1
Taiwan	2
United Kingdom	17
United States	21
Ukraine	1
Yugoslavia/FR Yugoslavia	2
Other/Unknown	2

== Professions ==
=== Medical and scientific professionals who died on Everest ===
See also Dr. Beck Weathers, a medical doctor who is famous for narrowly surviving the 1996 Everest Disaster.

- Dr. A. M. Kellas (1921, en route to Everest as part of expedition)
- Dr. Karl G. Henize (1993), PhD in Astronomy and U.S. Astronaut
- Dr. Sándor Gárdos (2001), Hungarian team doctor, specialist of high altitude medicine
- Dr. Nils Antezana (2004), Pathologist
- Dr. Robert Milne (2005), Software Engineer
- Dr. Peter Kinloch (2010)
- Dr. Eberhard Schaaf (2012), German doctor who died in high altitude
- Dr. Charles MacAdams (2016)
- Dr. Maria Strydom (2016)
- Dr. Roland Yearwood (2017), a medical doctor in Alabama (USA)
- Dr. Jonathan Sugarman (2023), a retired medical doctor from Washington State (USA)

== Other statistics ==
=== Named corpses ===
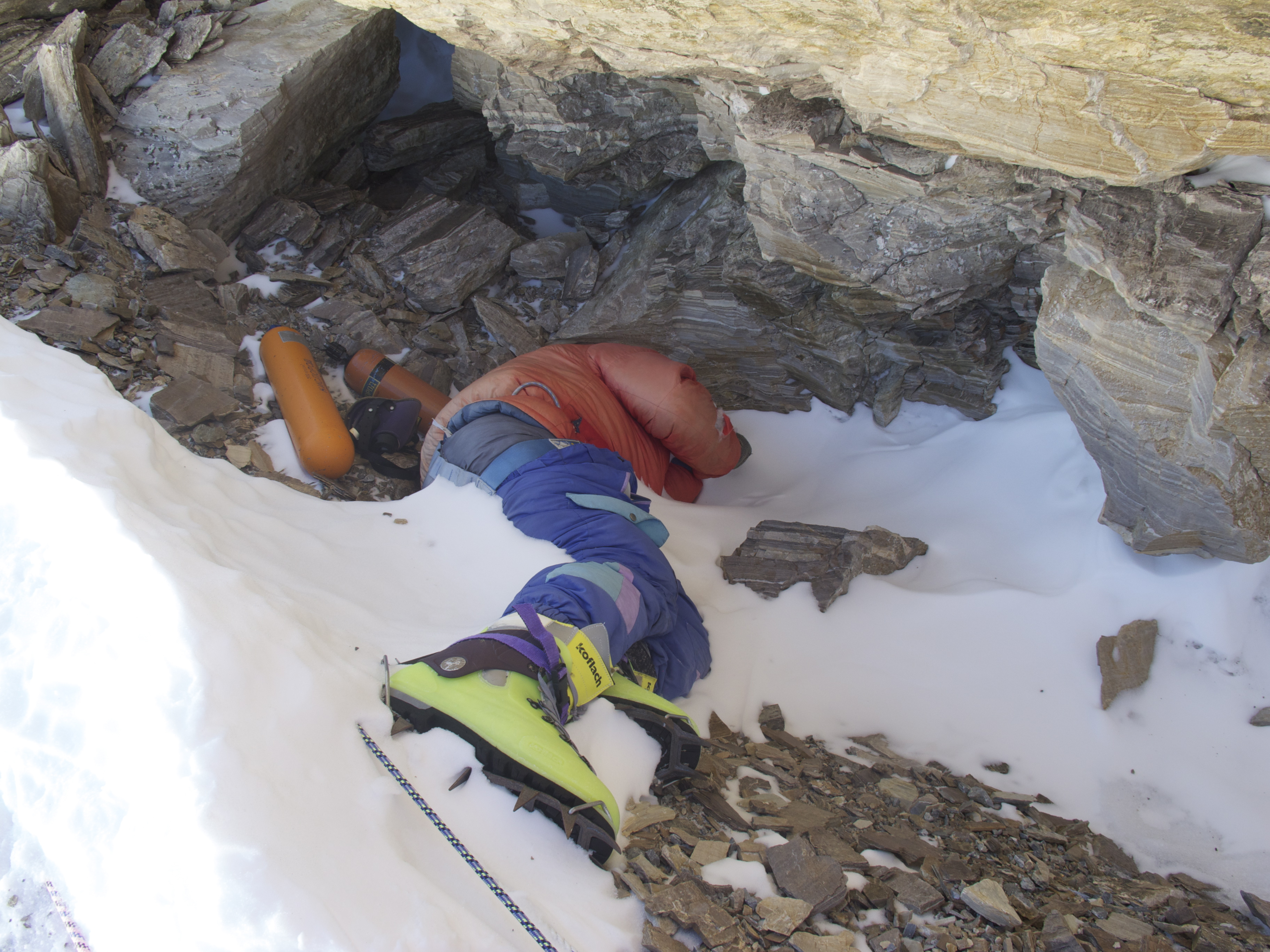
The corpse known as Green Boots in its eponymous Everest cave

- "The German Woman", Hannelore Schmatz
- "Green Boots", Dorje Morup
- "Sleeping Beauty", Francys Arsentiev

=== Died on descent after summiting ===
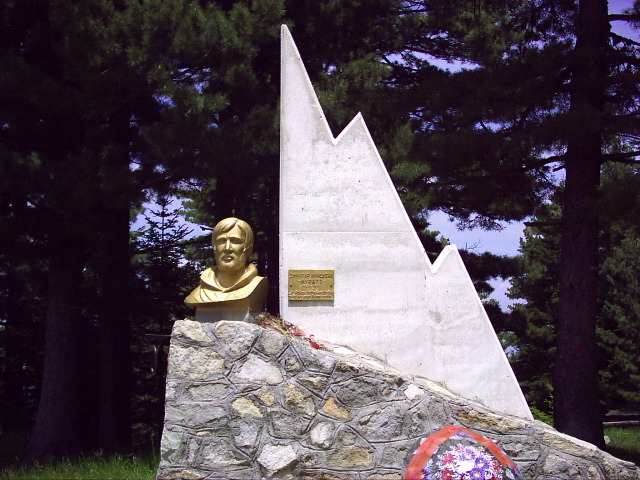
Memorial of Dimitar Ilievski, who died descending from the mountain

Examples of those who, after summiting, died on the descent down or soon after (not counting other climbs, on the same expedition but does not have to be their first summit)

examples only

- Dimitar Ilievski-Murato
- Francys Arsentiev
- Hannelore Schmatz
- Hristo Prodanov
- Jozef Psotka
- Lobsang Tshering
- Marco Siffredi
- Pasang Lhamu Sherpa
- Ray Genet
- Shoko Ota (2004)
- Shriya Shah-Klorfine (2012)
- Tomas Olsson
- Vitor Negrete
- Yasuko Namba

== See also ==
- 2014 Nepal snowstorm disaster
- The Himalayan Database
- List of deaths on eight-thousanders
- List of Mount Everest records
- List of people who died climbing Mount Everest
- List of mountaineering disasters by death toll
- Mount Hood climbing accidents
