= Prodanov =

Prodanov is a surname. Notable people with the surname include:

- Hristo Prodanov (1943–1984) Bulgarian mountaineer
- Vitomir Prodanov (1890–1958) 42nd Patriarch of the Serbian Orthodox Church
- Nikola Prodanov (born 1940) Bulgarian gymnast
- Konstantin Prodanov (born 1977) Bulgarian politician
