= List of people who died climbing Mount Everest =

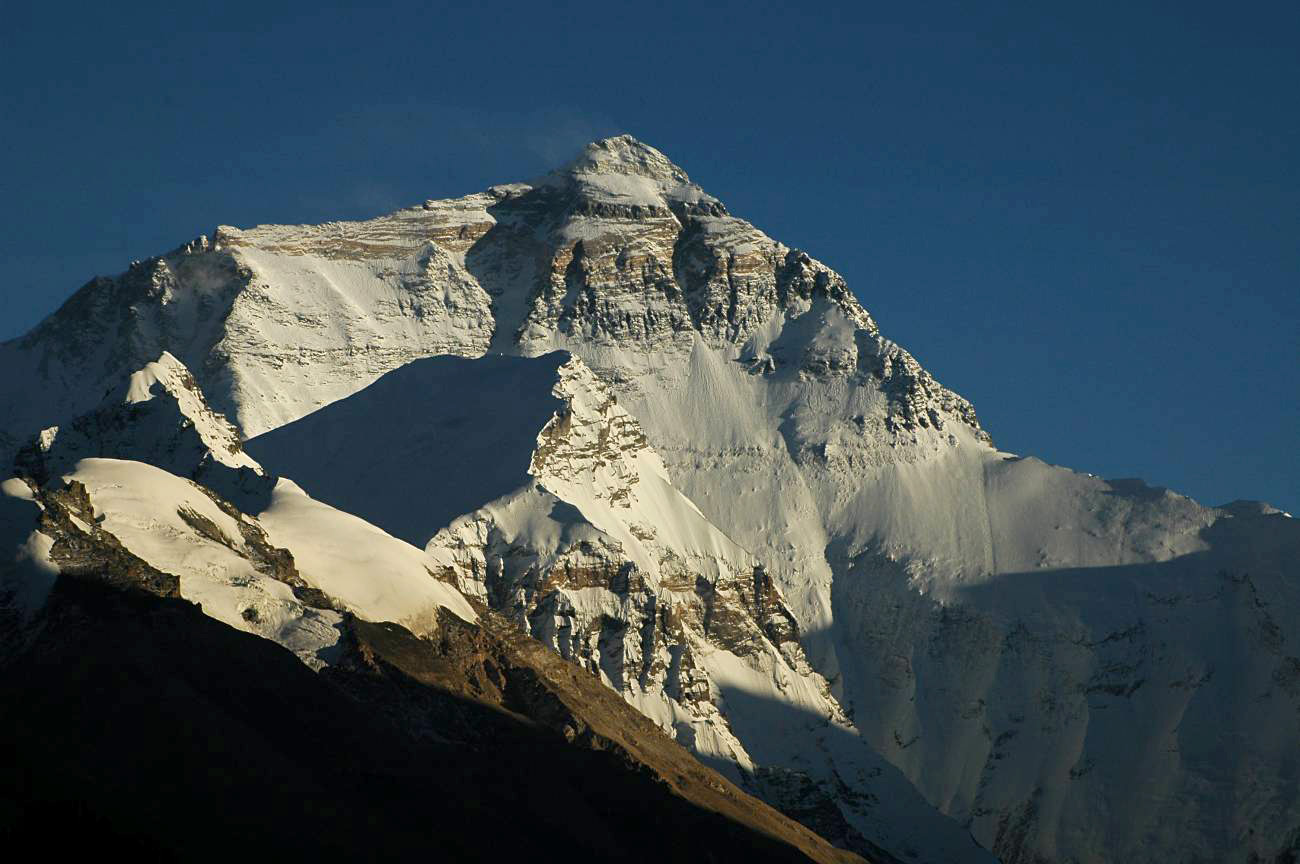
North face of Mount Everest

At least 346 people have died attempting to reach—or return from—the summit of Mount Everest which, at 8,848.86 m (29,031 ft 8 1/2 in), is Earth's highest mountain and a particularly desirable peak for mountaineers. The most recent years without known deaths on the mountain are 1977, in which only two people reached the summit, and 2020, when permits were suspended by Nepal because of the COVID-19 pandemic.

Deaths have been attributed to hypoxia, avalanches, falls, serac collapse, exposure, frostbite, or health problems related to conditions on the mountain. Not all bodies have been located, so details on those deaths are not available.

Yearly deaths on Mount Everest 1921–2024. Noting sherpa and non-sherpa deaths.

The upper reaches of the mountain are in the death zone, a mountaineering term for altitudes above a certain point – around 8,000 m (26,000 ft), or less than 356 millibars (5.16 psi) of atmospheric pressure – where the oxygen pressure level is not sufficient to sustain human life. Many deaths in high-altitude mountaineering have been caused by the effects of the death zone, either directly (loss of vital functions) or indirectly (unwise decisions made under stress or physical weakening leading to accidents). In the death zone, the human body cannot acclimatize, as it uses oxygen faster than it can be replenished. An extended stay in the zone without supplementary oxygen will result in deterioration of bodily functions, loss of consciousness, and death.

== Background ==
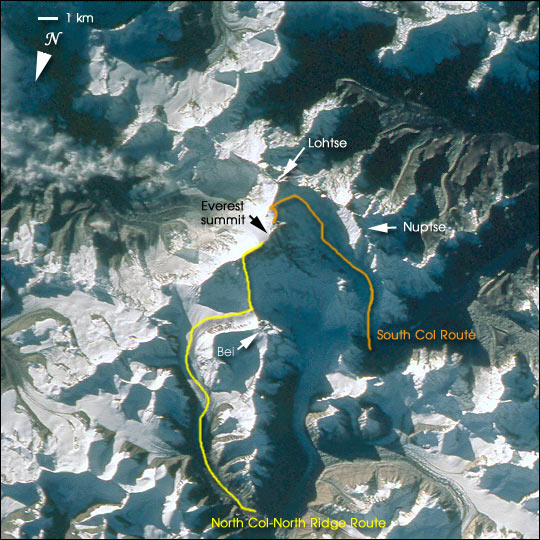
Routes to Mount Everest's summit from the north (yellow) and south (orange)

During the 1921 British Mount Everest reconnaissance expedition, two people died en route to the mountain: an unidentified porter and heart attack victim A. M. Kellas. The first recorded deaths on the mountain itself were seven porters who perished in an avalanche in the 1922 British Mount Everest expedition. Their names were inscribed on a memorial cairn erected at the Base Camp used by the 1924 British Mount Everest expedition.

In 1996, 15 people died trying to reach the summit, the most in a single year to that date. The number reflects the large number of climbers that year rather than a spike in the death rate: before 1996, one in four climbers died making the ascent, while in 1996, one in seven died. But it also includes the 1996 Mount Everest disaster, during which eight people died due to being caught in a blizzard while making summit attempts. Among them was guide Rob Hall, the first non-Sherpa to have summited five times. Two books detailing the disaster, Into Thin Air by Jon Krakauer and The Climb by Anatoli Boukreev, both written by mountaineers who were on Mount Everest at the time, give conflicting accounts of the events.

The 1996 record was surpassed in the 2014, 2015 and 2023 seasons. There were few summits from the south in 2014 and none in 2015. On April 18, 2014, 16 Sherpas were killed in an avalanche in the Khumbu Icefall. On April 25, 2015, 19 people—the most ever in a single day on Everest—were killed in an avalanche at base camp after a 7.8 earthquake, which killed more than 9,000 people and injured more than 23,000 in Nepal. During the 2023 season, a total of 17 climbers died to and from the summit. Almost none of the deaths are related to one another.

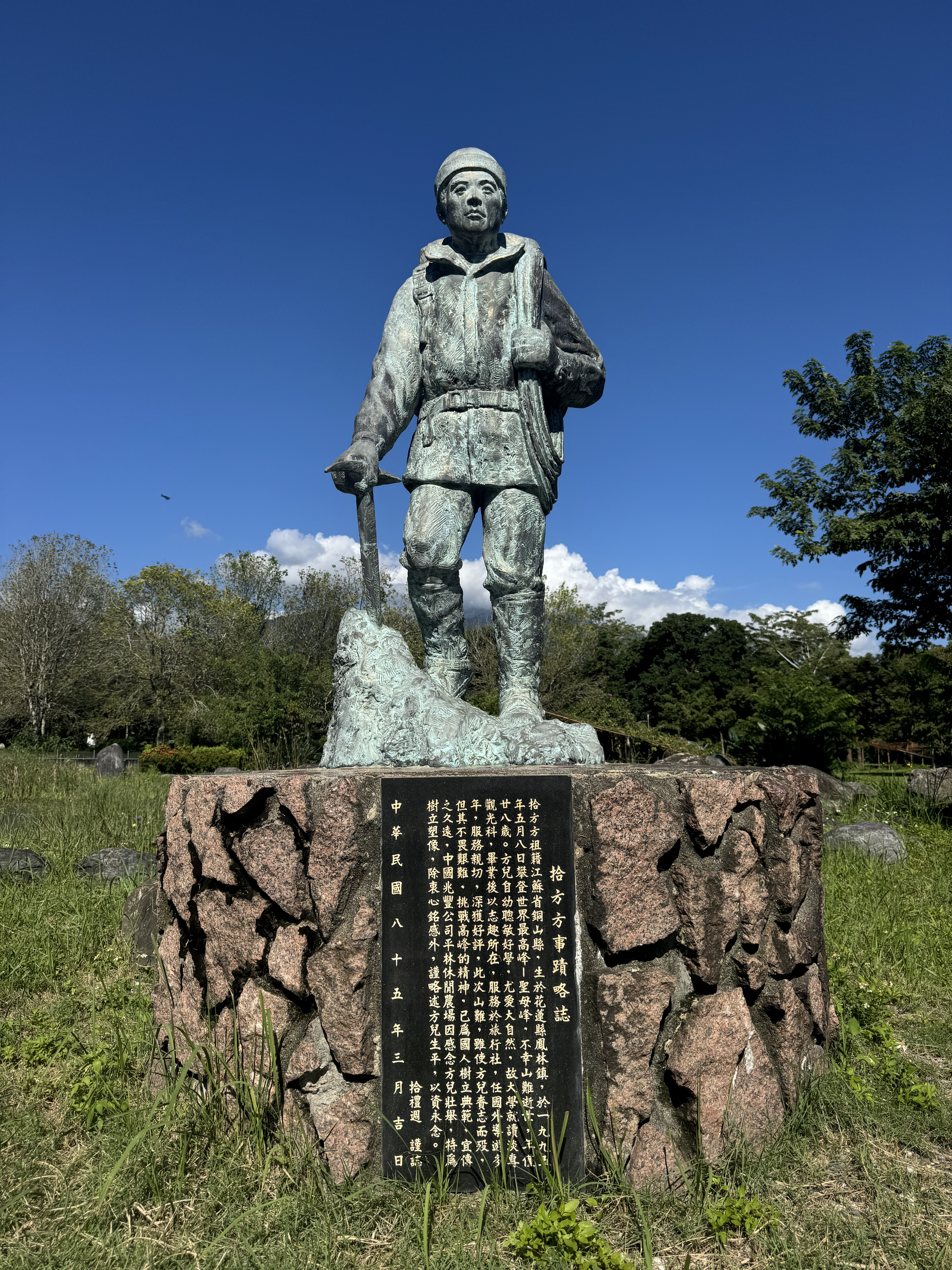
Bronze statue of Shih Fang-Fang

In 2001, Babu Chiri Sherpa died from a fall near Camp II. He had climbed the mountain 10 times and spent 20 hours on the summit of Everest in 1999, then a new record. He also climbed to the summit twice in two weeks and held the record climbing time from base camp to summit of 16 hours and 56 minutes.

In 2019, 11 people died on Everest during a record season with a huge number of climbers. Videos shared on social media showed climbers waiting in long queues to advance up the mountain.

Due to the difficulties and dangers in bringing bodies down, most who die on the mountain remain where they fall. Two Nepalese climbers died on October 24, 1984, while trying to recover the body of Hannelore Schmatz. In 1999, searchers for George Mallory's body found his and other bodies in the snow in a catchment basin near the peak. (Note: Unconfirmed Russian deaths on the north side of Everest resulted from an alleged 1952 expedition. The Chinese, upon taking control of the region, enacted strict travel restrictions. Supposedly, the Chinese government did allow some Soviet climbers near the mountain, and reports leaked out of a Soviet expedition in 1952. The expedition, apparently led by Pavel Datschnolian, was said to have been a disaster, resulting in the deaths of Datschnolian and five other men. However, Russian and Chinese authorities have consistently denied that such an attempt took place, no physical evidence has ever been found to confirm its existence, nor is there any record of a person named Pavel Datschnolian.)

Melting glaciers are revealing bodies on Everest. The Nepalese government does clean-up efforts to remove trash left by climbers, and also recovers bodies along with these efforts. Four unidentified bodies were recovered in 2019. Another five unidentified bodies were recovered in 2024.

== Deaths ==
Information on 351 of the people who died climbing Mount Everest are listed in the table below.

Name	Date	Age	Expedition	Nationality	Cause of death	Location	Remains status	Refs
Alexander Mitchell Kellas	June 5, 1921	52	1921 British Mount Everest reconnaissance expedition	United Kingdom	Heart attack	En route to base camp near the Tibetan village of Kampa Dzong	Recovered, buried near Kampa Dzong	
Unknown porter	June 5, 1921		1921 British Mount Everest reconnaissance expedition			En route to base camp near the Tibetan village of Kampa Dzong		
Dorje	June 7, 1922		1922 British Mount Everest expedition	Nepal	Avalanche	Below North Col		
Lhakpa	June 7, 1922		1922 British Mount Everest expedition	Nepal	Avalanche	Below North Col		
Norbu	June 7, 1922		1922 British Mount Everest expedition	Nepal	Avalanche	Below North Col		
Pasang	June 7, 1922		1922 British Mount Everest expedition	Nepal	Avalanche	Below North Col		
Pema	June 7, 1922		1922 British Mount Everest expedition	Nepal	Avalanche	Below North Col		
Sange	June 7, 1922		1922 British Mount Everest expedition	Nepal	Avalanche	Below North Col		
Temba	June 7, 1922		1922 British Mount Everest expedition	Nepal	Avalanche	Below North Col		
Man Bahadur	May 13, 1924		1924 British Mount Everest expedition	Nepal	Pneumonia	Above Rongbuk B.C.		
Lance-Naik Shamsherpun	May 17, 1924		1924 British Mount Everest expedition	Nepal	Brain hemorrhage	Above Rongbuk B.C.		
Andrew Irvine	June 9, 1924	22	1924 British Mount Everest expedition	United Kingdom	Unknown	N.E. Ridge	Remains found (partial) in 2024	
George Mallory	June 9, 1924	37	1924 British Mount Everest expedition	United Kingdom	Possible ice axe injury following a fall	N.E. Ridge	Remains found and buried in situ in 1999	
Maurice Wilson	May 31, 1934 (Note: Date of death not known exactly; this date was his last diary entry.)	36	Solo Expedition	United Kingdom	Possible exhaustion, exposure or starvation	East Rongbuk Glacier	Remains found in 1935	
Dorje Mingma	October 31, 1952		Swiss Expedition	Nepal	Falling ice	Lhotse Face		
Wang Ji	April 11, 1960		Chinese Expedition Northern Slope	China	Mountain sickness			
Shao Shi-Ching (Note: Also known as Zhao Ziqing)	April 29, 1960		Chinese Expedition Northern Slope	China		N.E. Ridge		
Nawang Tshering	April 28, 1962		Chinese Expedition Northern Slope	Nepal		Lhotse face		
Jake Breitenbach	March 23, 1963	27	Norman Dyhrenfurth's American Mount Everest Expedition	United States	Crushed under serac	Icefall		
Ma Gao-shu	May 1, 1966		Chinese Everest Expedition	China	Fall	Icefall		
Phu Dorjee Sherpa	October 18, 1969		Japanese Everest Expedition	Nepal	Fall into a crevasse	Icefall		
Nima Dorje	April 5, 1970		Japanese Skiing Expedition	Nepal	Avalanche	Icefall		
Kunga Norbu	April 5, 1970		Japanese Skiing Expedition	Nepal	Avalanche			
Mima Norbu	April 5, 1970		Japanese Skiing Expedition	Nepal	Avalanche	Icefall		
Pasang	April 5, 1970		Japanese Skiing Expedition	Nepal	Avalanche	Icefall		
Kami Tshering	April 5, 1970		Japanese Skiing Expedition	Nepal	Avalanche	Icefall		
Kyak Tsering	April 9, 1970	36	Japanese Skiing Expedition	Nepal	Crushed under serac	5525 m		
Kiyoshi Narita	April 21, 1970		Japanese Skiing Expedition	Japan	Heart attack	6150m		
Harsh Vardhan	April 18, 1971	31	International Expedition of 1971	India	Succumbed after falling and being suspended above a crevasse during a blizzard	6900m		
Tony Tighe	November 16, 1972		Mt. Qomolangma expedition	Australia	Crushed under serac	Icefall		
Jangbu	October 12, 1973			Nepal	Avalanche	S.W. Face		
Gérard Devouassoux	September 9, 1974	34	1974 French Mount Everest expedition	France	Avalanche	6400m		
Pemba Dorje	September 9, 1974		1974 French Mount Everest expedition	Nepal	Avalanche	6400m		
Lhakpa	September 9, 1974		1974 French Mount Everest expedition	Nepal	Avalanche	6400m		
Nawang Lutuk	September 9, 1974		1974 French Mount Everest expedition	Nepal	Avalanche	6400m		
Nima Wangchu	September 9, 1974		1974 French Mount Everest expedition	Nepal	Avalanche	6400m		
Sanu Wongal	September 9, 1974		1974 French Mount Everest expedition	Nepal	Avalanche	6400m		
Wu Zhuong Yue (Note: Also known as Wu Tsung-yue)	May 4, 1975			China	Exhaustion, fall	8500m		
Mingma; deaf-mute Sherpa porter	August 1975	"Young"	1975 British Mount Everest Southwest Face expedition	Nepal	Drowned	Below Base Camp		
Mick Burke	September 26, 1975	34	Bonington's 1975 Everest expedition	United Kingdom	Disappearance (likely accidental death during climb)	Near Summit		
Terry Thompson	April 10, 1976		British-Nepal Army Everest Expedition	United Kingdom	Fall into a crevasse	Camp II		
Dawa Nuru	April 18, 1978			Nepal	Fall into a crevasse	Icefall		
Shi Ming-ji	April 18, 1978		Chinese Iranian Expedition	China	Fall into a crevasse	Icefall		
Ang Phu	May 16, 1979		1979 Yugoslav West Ridge expedition	Nepal	Fall	Icefall		
Ray Genet	October 2, 1979	48	Gerhard Schmatz German Expedition or 1979 Swabian expedition	United States	Exposure or exhaustion	8400m S.E. Ridge		
Hannelore Schmatz	October 3, 1979	39	Gerhard Schmatz German Expedition or 1979 Swabian expedition	West Germany	Exposure or exhaustion	8400m S.E. Ridge	Remains found, body removal was attempted but resulted in death for two sherpas	
Wang Hong-bao	October 12, 1979		Japanese Alpine Club reconnaissance expedition	China	Avalanche	Below North Col		
Lou Lan (Note: Also known as Luo San)	October 12, 1979		Japanese Alpine Club reconnaissance expedition	China	Avalanche	Below North Col		
Nima Thaxi (Note: Also known as Nima Tashi)	October 12, 1979		Japanese Alpine Club reconnaissance expedition	China	Avalanche	Below North Col		
Akira Ube	May 2, 1980	31	Japanese Alpine Society expedition	Japan	Avalanche	7900m North Face (Hornbein Couloir)		
Nawang Kersang	September 6, 1980		Italian expedition	Nepal	Fall	Icefall		
Mario Piana	September 22, 1980		Italian expedition	Italy	Crushed under serac	Lhotse Face		
Noboru Takenaka	January 12, 1981	28	Japanese winter expedition	Japan	Fall	6900m W. Cwm		
Marty Hoey	May 15, 1982	30	Whittaker American expedition	United States	Fall	8000m		
Peter Boardman	May 17, 1982	31	British Mount Everest expedition	United Kingdom	Disappearance (likely accidental death during climb)	North-East Ridge (approx. 8200m)		
Joe Tasker	May 17, 1982	33	British Mount Everest expedition	United Kingdom	Disappearance (likely accidental death during climb)	North-East Ridge (approx. 8200m)		
Ang Chuldim	August 31, 1982	20	Bill March Canadian expedition	Nepal	Avalanche	Icefall		
Dawa Dorje	August 31, 1982	42	Bill March Canadian expedition	Nepal	Avalanche	Icefall		
Pasang Sona	August 31, 1982	38	Bill March Canadian expedition	Nepal	Avalanche	Icefall		
Blair Griffiths	September 2, 1982	33	Bill March Canadian expedition	Canada	Crushed under serac	Icefall		
Lhakpa Tshering	September 27, 1982		Spanish expedition	Nepal	Internal hemorrhage	6770m		
Nima Dorje	October 14, 1982		Spanish expedition	Nepal	Fall	8300m W ridge		
Yasuo Kato	December 28, 1982	33	Japanese expedition	Japan	Disappearance (likely accidental death during climb)	Near Summit		
Toshiaki Kobayashi	December 28, 1982		Japanese expedition	Japan	Disappearance (likely accidental death during climb)	Near Summit		
Hironobu Kamuro	October 8, 1983		Japanese expedition	Japan	Fall	Near Summit		
Pasang Temba	October 8, 1983		Japanese expedition	Nepal	Fall	8600m SE Ridge		
Hiroshi Yoshino	October 9, 1983		Japanese expedition	Japan	Fall	Near Summit		
Ang Rinji	March 26, 1984		Indian expedition	Nepal	Avalanche	Icefall		
Tony Swierzy	April 3, 1984	27	Micheal Lane British North Face expedition	United Kingdom	Avalanche	6238m		
Hristo Ivanov Prodanov	April 21, 1984	40	Bulgarian West Face expedition	Bulgaria	Disappearance (likely accidental death during descent)	8500m West Ridge		
William (Fred) From	October 9, 1984	28	Australian-New Zealand expedition	Australia	Fall, while searching for Craig Nottle	8000m		
Craig Nottle	October 9, 1984	23	Australian-New Zealand expedition	Australia	Fall	8000m		
Jozef Psotka	October 16, 1984	50	Australian-New Zealand expedition	Czechoslovakia (Slovak)	Exhaustion + Fall 1000m to Western Cauldron	6700m during descent	found by Jozef Justo, buried where found	
Ang Dorje	October 24, 1984	35	Mission to recover body of Hannelore Schmatz	Nepal	Fall	8400m S.E. Ridge		
Yogendra Bahadur Thapa	October 24, 1984	36	Mission to recover body of Hannelore Schmatz	Nepal	Fall	8400m S.E. Ridge		
Juanjo Navarro	May 12, 1985		Navarrese expedition	Spain	Fall	7300m		
Shinichi Ishii	September 19, 1985		Japanese expedition	Japan	Avalanche	Below North Col		
Kiran Inder Kumar	October 7, 1985	40	Indian expedition	India	Fall	7986m		
Jai Vardhan Bahugana	October 11, 1985		Indian expedition	India	Exposure	South Col		
Ranjeet Singh Bakshi	October 11, 1985		Indian expedition	India	Exposure	South Col		
Vijay Pal Singh Negi	October 11, 1985	28	Indian expedition	India	Exposure	South Col		
M.U. Bhaskar Rao	October 11, 1985		Indian expedition	India	Exposure	South Col		
Víctor Hugo Trujillo	August 16, 1986	22		Chile	Avalanche	Below North Col		
Simon Burkhardt	September 28, 1986	52	Eiselin Sports expedition	Switzerland	Avalanche	7315m		
Gyalu	October 4, 1986		Eiselin Sports expedition	Nepal	Crushed under serac	Icefall		
Dawa Norbu	October 17, 1986		Eiselin Sports expedition	Nepal	Avalanche	Below North Col		
Tsuttin Dorje	January 30, 1987			Nepal	Fall	7700m		
Roger Marshall	May 21, 1987	45		Canada	Disappearance (likely accidental death during descent)	Hornbein Couloir, Near Summit		
Masao Yokoyama	September 2, 1987	44	Japanese expedition	Japan	Drowned	East Rongbuk Glacier		
Mangal Singh	October 20, 1987		British expedition	Nepal	Avalanche	Base camp		
Hidetaka Mizukoshi	April 21, 1988		35th Anniversary climb with Chinese, Japanese and Nepalese nationals	Japan	Heart attack	Base camp		
Michel Parmentier	September 20, 1988		International	France	Exposure	7700m		
Narayan Shrestha	September 21, 1988			Nepal	Avalanche	7200m		
Lhakpa Sonam	October 13, 1988			Nepal	Fall	8200m		
Pasang Temba	October 13, 1988			Nepal	Fall	8200m		
Dušan Becík	October 17, 1988	34	Czechoslovak - New Zealand Mount Everest Southwest Face Expedition	Czechoslovakia (Slovak)	Disappearance (death during descent after reaching South Summit, sudden worsening weather)	8000m S.W. Ridge		
Peter Božík	October 17, 1988	34	Czechoslovak - New Zealand Mount Everest Southwest Face Expedition	Czechoslovakia (Slovak)	Disappearance (death during descent after reaching South Summit, sudden worsening weather)	8000m S.W. Ridge		
Jaroslav Jaško	October 17, 1988	26	Czechoslovak - New Zealand Mount Everest Southwest Face Expedition	Czechoslovakia (Slovak)	Disappearance (death during descent after reaching South Summit, sudden worsening weather)	8000m S.W. Ridge		
Jozef Just	October 17, 1988	33	Czechoslovak - New Zealand Mount Everest Southwest Face Expedition	Czechoslovakia (Slovak)	Disappearance (death during descent after reaching South Summit, sudden worsening weather)	8000m S.W. Ridge		
Ang Lhakpa	December 23, 1988			Nepal	Cerebral thrombosis	South Col		
Dimitar Ilievski-Murato	May 10, 1989	35		Yugoslavia	Fall	Descending South Col Route		
Phu Dorje	May 16, 1989			Nepal	Fall	Descending South Col Route		
Mirosław Dąsal	May 27, 1989	37	Polish-led expedition that included four U.S. mountaineers	Poland	Avalanche	7200m W ridge		
Mirosław Gardzielewski	May 27, 1989	37	Polish-led expedition that included four U.S. mountaineers	Poland	Avalanche	7200m W ridge		
Andrzej Heinrich	May 27, 1989	51	Polish-led expedition that included four U.S. mountaineers	Poland	Avalanche	7200m W ridge		
Wacław Otręba	May 27, 1989	42	Polish-led expedition that included four U.S. mountaineers	Poland	Avalanche	7200m W ridge		
Eugeniusz Chrobak	May 28, 1989	50	Polish-led expedition that included four U.S. mountaineers	Poland	Avalanche injuries	Lho La camp		
Ang Pinjo	December 12, 1989		South Korean expedition	Nepal	Altitude sickness, heart attack			
Rafael Gómez-Menor	September 14, 1990			Spain	Avalanche			
Ang Sona	September 14, 1990			Nepal	Avalanche			
Badri Nath / Badrinath Ghising	September 14, 1990			Nepal	Avalanche			
Ham Sang-hun	October 7, 1990		Japanese-Korean expedition	South Korea	Disappearance (likely accidental death during climb)			
Rüdiger Lang	May 3, 1991		Austrian solo expedition	Germany	Exposure	7850m N.E. Ridge		
Junichi Futagami	May 27, 1991		Japanese solo expedition	Japan	Fall	8700m NE		
Deepak Kulkarni	May 2, 1992		Indian expedition	India	Exposure			
Raymond Jacob	May 2, 1992		Indian expedition	India	Exposure			
Subba Singh	May 11, 1992	43		Nepal	Heart attack			
Sher Singh	May 23, 1992		Indian expedition	India	Fall	Icefall		
Manabu Hoshi	May 23, 1992		Japanese expedition	Japan	Disappearance (likely accidental death during climb)	8350m NE		
Ang Tshering	January 15, 1993		Spanish expedition	Nepal	Fall			
Pasang Lhamu Sherpa	April 23, 1993	32	Nepalese expedition	Nepal	Disappearance (likely accidental death during climb)	8750m S.E. Ridge		
Sonam Tshering	April 23, 1993		Nepalese expedition	Nepal	Disappearance (likely accidental death during climb)	8750m S.E. Ridge		
Lobsang Tshering Bhutia	May 10, 1993	41	40th anniversary of Tenzing Norgay's climb	Nepal	Fall	8750m S.E. Ridge		
Nam Won-woo	May 16, 1993		South Korean expedition	South Korea	Fall	8450m S.E. Ridge		
A Jin-seob	May 17, 1993		South Korean expedition	South Korea	Fall	8450m S.E. Ridge		
Karl Henize	October 5, 1993	66	British expedition	United States	HAPE (high-altitude pulmonary edema)	6400m	Buried near the Changtse Glacier	
Antonio Miranda	October 7, 1993			Spain	Fall			
Prem Thapa	April 6, 1994		German expedition	Nepal	Cerebral edema			
Shih Fang-Fang 'Norman'	May 9, 1994	27	Taiwanese expedition	Taiwan	Exposure or exhaustion			
Giuseppe Vigani	May 18, 1994	43	Italian expedition	Italy	Fall	North Face		
Mike Rheinberger	May 27, 1994	53	Australian expedition	Australia	Fall	8500m NE		
Mingma Norbu	September 12, 1994		Norwegian expedition	Nepal	Avalanche			
Kami Rita	May 6, 1995		American expedition	Nepal	Fall			
Lhakpa Nuru	September 10, 1995		South Korean Expedition	Nepal		6900m		
Zangbu	October 14, 1995		South Korean expedition	Nepal	Fall	Near Summit		
Chen Yu-Nan	May 9, 1996	36	"Makalu" Gau Ming-Ho Taiwanese expedition	Taiwan	Injuries from a fall	7200m South Col		
Scott Fischer	May 11, 1996	40	Mountain Madness	United States	Suspected HACE (high-altitude cerebral edema), exhaustion, frostbite and exposure.	8300m S.E. Ridge	Recovered, buried on Everest	
Rob Hall	May 11, 1996	35	Adventure Consultants	New Zealand	Exposure	South Summit	Remains found	
Doug Hansen	May 11, 1996	46	Adventure Consultants	United States	Exposure	8700m South Col	Not recovered	
Andrew Harris	May 11, 1996	31	Adventure Consultants	New Zealand	Disappearance (likely accidental death during climb)	8700m S.E. Ridge	Not recovered	
Yasuko Namba	May 11, 1996	47	Adventure Consultants	Japan	Exposure	7900m South Col	Recovered in 1997 and buried in Japan	
Dorje Morup	May 11, 1996	47	Indo-Tibetan Border Police	India	Exposure	8600m N.E. Ridge	Not yet recovered, identified as Green Boots in 2026	
Tsewang Paljor	May 11, 1996	28	Indo-Tibetan Border Police	India	Exposure	8600m N.E. Ridge	Not recovered, previously theorized to be Green Boots	
Tsewang Samanla	May 11, 1996	38	Indo-Tibetan Border Police	India	Exposure	8600m N.E. Ridge		
Reinhard Wlasich	May 19, 1996	45	First Hungarian Mount Everest Expedition	Austria	Altitude sickness	8300m North Face, Great Couloir		
Bruce Herrod	May 25, 1996	37	South African/British	United Kingdom	Rope accident	8800m S.E. Ridge, Hillary Step		
Ngawang Topche	June 6, 1996		American	Nepal	Lapsed into coma on 23 Apr 1996; later died in hospital	Camp II		
Yves Bouchon	September 25, 1996	47	French/Belgian/Swiss	France	Avalanche	7800m Lhotse Face		
Lopsang Jangbu	September 25, 1996	25	Japanese	Nepal	Avalanche	7400m Lhotse Face		
Dawa	September 25, 1996		South Korea	Nepal	Avalanche	7400m Lhotse Face		
Malcolm Duff	April 23, 1997	43	British	United Kingdom	Heart attack	Base Camp		
Nima Rinzi	May 6, 1997		Malaysian	United Kingdom	Fall	Lhotse Face		
Aleksandr Torochin	May 7, 1997		Russian	Russia	Fall	8400m N.E. Ridge		
Ivan Plotnikov	May 7, 1997	36	Russian	Russia	Exposure or exhaustion	8700m N.E. Ridge		
Nikolai Chevtchenko	May 7, 1997	52	Russian	Russia	Exposure or exhaustion	8700m N.E. Ridge		
Mingma	May 7, 1997		Russian	Nepal	Fall	N.E. Ridge		
Peter Andreas Kowalzik	May 8, 1997	29	Polish	Germany	Disappearance (likely accidental death during climb)	8600m N.E. Ridge		
Tenzing Nuru	September 8, 1997		American	Nepal	Disappearance (likely accidental death during climb)	S.E. Ridge		
Choi Byong-soo	September 8, 1997	33	South Korean	South Korea	Avalanche	6800m North Col Flank		
Sergei Arsentiev	May 24, 1998	40	Russian/French	United States	Fall	N.E. Ridge	Remains found in 1999	
Francys Arsentiev	May 24, 1998	40	Russian/French	United States	Exposure or cerebral edema	N.E. Ridge	Remains found in 1998, pushed over the north edge in burial ceremony on Everest in 2007	
Mark Jennings	May 25, 1998	49	British	United Kingdom	Exhaustion	8200m N.E. Ridge		
Roger Buick	May 26, 1998	52	New Zealand	New Zealand	Exhaustion	7400m N.E. Ridge		
Shahid Abdul Khader	July 24, 1998	21		India	Fall	North Col		
Vasyl Kopytko	May 8, 1999	34	Ukrainian	Ukraine	Exposure	8500m N.E. Ridge		
Michael Matthews	May 13, 1999	22	International	United Kingdom	Disappearance (likely accidental death during descent)	S.E. Ridge	Not recovered	
Tadeusz Kudelski	May 18, 1999	44	Polish International	Poland	Fall	8600m N.E. Ridge		
Pascal Debrouwer	May 18, 1999	29	Belgian International	Belgium	Fall	8400m N.E. Ridge		
Jeppe Stoltz	May 20, 2000	27	Independent	Denmark	Fall	8500m N.E. Ridge		
Yan Genghua	May 21, 2000	41	Chinese	China	Disappearance (likely accidental death during descent)	8750m N.E. Ridge		
Babu Chiri Sherpa	April 29, 2001	35	Nepalese	Nepal	Fall	N.E. Ridge		
Peter Ganner	May 23, 2001	57	Austrian	Austria	Fall	8500m S.E. Ridge		
Mark Auricht	May 24, 2001	37	Australian	Australia	Cerebral edema	7900m N.E. Ridge		
Aleksei Nikiforov	May 24, 2001	45	Russian	Russia	Pre-existing illness exacerbated by freezing conditions, altitude	8500m N.E. Ridge		
Sándor Gárdos	October 17, 2001	38	Hungarian	Hungary	Fall	7800m N.E. Ridge		
Peter Legate	April 30, 2002	38	British International	United Kingdom	Fall	Below Camp III		
Zoran Miletić	May 17, 2002	41	Russian International	FR Yugoslavia	Unknown	7800m N.E. Ridge		
Marco Siffredi	September 8, 2002	23	International	France	Snowboarding accident	Hornbein Couloir		
Arnaud Saulnier	May 8, 2003	30	French	France	Sickness in tent	5500m S.E. Ridge		
Karma Gyalzen Sherpa	May 24, 2003		International	Nepal	Altitude sickness	6000m S.E. Ridge		
Jan Krzysztof Liszewski	May 25, 2003	55	Independent	Poland	Fall	7900m N.E. Ridge		
Bhim Bahadur Gurung	May 27, 2003	38	Indo-Nepal	Nepal	Fall	5900m Icefall		
Joon-ho Baek	May 18, 2004	38	South Korean	South Korea	Exposure	8500m N.E. Ridge		
Min Jang	May 18, 2004	28	South Korean	South Korea	Exposure	8500m N.E. Ridge		
Moo-taek Park	May 18, 2004	36	South Korean	South Korea	Exposure	8,750m N.E. Ridge	Remains found, body moved to 8,600m and covered with a cairn in 2005	
Nils Antezana	May 18, 2004	69	International	United States, Bolivia	Exposure	8600m S.E. Ridge		
Hristo Ganchev Hristov	May 20, 2004	27	Bulgarian	Bulgaria	Exposure	8600m N.E. Ridge		
Shoko Ota	May 20, 2004	63	Adventure Guides	Japan	Lost consciousness during descent	8600m N.E. Ridge		
Mariana Prodanova Maslarova	May 23, 2004	43	Bulgarian	Bulgaria	Exposure	8700m N.E. Ridge		
Sean Egan	April 28, 2005	63	Tim Redpath Expedition	Canada	Heart attack	4600m S.E. Ridge		
Michael Corey O'Brien	May 2, 2005	39	Charity run with brother	United States	Fall	5800m Icefall South		
Marko Lihteneker	May 21, 2005	35	7 Summits Club	Slovenia	Oxygen problems which resulted in fall	8600m N.E. Ridge		
Sirigereshiva Shankarappa Chaitanya	May 30, 2005	31	Indian	India	Exposure	8700m N.E. Ridge		
Dieter Kramer	June 4, 2005	49	German	Germany	Exposure	8000m N.E.		
Robert William Milne	June 5, 2005	49	Himalayan Guides	United KingdomUnited States	Organ failure due to freezing conditions	8200m S.E. Ridge		
Tuk Bahadur Thapa Magar Sherpa	April 7, 2006		American	Nepal	Altitude sickness	5500m N.E. Ridge		
Ang Phinjo Sherpa	April 21, 2006	50	American	Nepal	Avalanche	5900m Icefall		
Lhakpa Tseri	April 21, 2006		American	Nepal	Avalanche	5900m Icefall		
Dawa Temba	April 21, 2006		American	Nepal	Avalanche	5900m Icefall		
Srikrishna	May 14, 2006		Indian	India	Fall	8600m N.E. Ridge		
David Sharp	May 15, 2006	34	Asian Trekking	United Kingdom	Exposure or exhaustion	8600m N.E. Ridge	Remains found, body removed from sight per the request of family	
Tomas Olsson	May 16, 2006	30	Independent	Sweden	Fall	8700m Norton Couloir		
Jacques-Hugues Letrange	May 17, 2006	32	American	France	Exhaustion	8750m N.E. Ridge		
Vitor Negrete	May 19, 2006	38	Asian Trekking	Brazil	Exposure or exhaustion	Camp III, 8200m N.E. Ridge	Recovered, buried in Camp III	
Igor Plyushkin	May 22, 2006	54	Asian Trekking	Russia	Altitude sickness	7800m N.E. Ridge		
Thomas Weber	May 25, 2006	41	Asian Trekking	Germany	Altitude sickness	8700m N.E. Ridge		
Dawa Sherpa	April 26, 2007			Nepal		7200m South Col		
Yoshitomi Okura	May 16, 2007	62	Japanese	Japan	Altitude sickness	8650m N.E. Ridge		
Shinichi Ishii	May 17, 2007			Japan		8650m		
Libor Kozák	May 17, 2007	47		Czech Republic		8300m		
Maurizio Pierangelo	May 17, 2007	51	Italian	Italy	Disappearance	8800m N.E. Ridge		
Oh Hee-joon	May 17, 2007	37	South Korean	South Korea		S.W. Face		
Lee Hyun-jo	May 17, 2007	34	South Korean	South Korea	Avalanche	7700m S.W. Face		
Uwe Gianni Goltz	May 22, 2008	44	Sherpas documentary team	Switzerland	Exhaustion	8000m South Col	Recovered, buried at the big stone	
Lhakpa Nuru	May 7, 2009		Eco Everest Expedition	Nepal	Avalanche	Icefall		
Věslav Chrzaszcz	May 18, 2009	47	Asian Trekking	Czech Republic	Heart attack	4700m N.E. Ridge		
Wenhong Wu	May 19, 2009	41	Holy Mountain China	China	Altitude sickness	N.E. Ridge 8750m		
Frank Ziebarth	May 21, 2009	29	Independent	Canada	Hypothermia and lack of oxygen	8700m North Summit		
László Várkonyi	April 26, 2010	54	Asian Trekking	Hungary	Avalanche crevasse fall	6800m North Col		
Tom Jørgensen	May 19, 2010	56		Denmark	HACE			
Peter Kinloch	May 26, 2010	28	International	United Kingdom	Exhaustion	8600m		
Rick Hitch	May 1, 2011	55	International	United States	Heart attack	7010m	Recovered	
Shailendra Kumar Upadhyaya	May 9, 2011	82	Nepal	Nepal	Altitude sickness	Base Camp		
Takashi Ozaki	May 12, 2011	58	Ozaki Filming Expedition to Everest	Japan	Hypoxia, Altitude sickness	8400m The Balcony	Recovered	
John Delaney	May 21, 2011	42	International	Ireland	Altitude sickness	8400m The Balcony		
Hiroaki Kino	September 15, 2011	48	Bochi Bochi Trek	Japan	Cerebral apoplexy	Base Camp		
Dawa Tenzing	April 5, 2012		Himex	Nepal	Stroke (CVA)	Icefall		
Karsang Namgyal Sherpa	April 19, 2012		Prestige Adventures	Nepal	Altitude sickness	Base Camp		
Ramesh Gulve	April 20, 2012	33	Pune team	India	Stroke	Base Camp		
Namgyal Tshering Sherpa	April 21, 2012	28		Nepal	Fall	Camp I		
Shriya Shah-Klorfine	May 19, 2012	33	Utmost Adventures	Canada	Exhaustion	Below Balcony 8300m	Recovered	
Eberhard Schaaf	May 19, 2012	61	Asian Trekking	Germany	Cerebral edema	Hillary Step		
Song Won-bin	May 19, 2012	44	Korean Everest & Lhotse Expedition	South Korea	Fall	Balcony		
Ha Wenyi	May 20, 2012	55	Mountain Experience	China	Suspected altitude sickness	Balcony		
Juan José Polo Carbayo	May 20, 2012	43	Himalayan Guides	Spain	Exhaustion	8300m N.E. Ridge		
Ralf D. Arnold	May 20, 2012	43	Monterosa	Germany	Exhaustion and related complications after breaking leg at Second Step	8300m N.E. Ridge		
Mingma Sherpa	April 7, 2013	45	Destination Himalaya	Nepal	Fall	Between Camps I and II in the Western Cwm		
DaRita Sherpa	May 5, 2013	37	International Mountain Guides	Nepal	Suspected cardiac arrest	Camp III on south side		
Sergey Ponomarev	May 5, 2013	43	7 Summits Club Everest expedition	Russia	Suspected cardiac arrest	At 100m above ABC on north side (at about 6500m)		
Lobsang Sherpa	May 7, 2013	22	Chinese expedition team	Nepal	Fall	Between Camp II and Camp III on descent from Camp IV (on south side)		
Alexey Bolotov	May 15, 2013	50	Russian South-West Face expedition	Russia	Fall	5600m Icefall	Recovered	
Namgyal Sherpa	May 17, 2013	35		Nepal		8300m N.E. Ridge		
Seo Sung-ho	May 21, 2013	33	Zero to 8848 expedition	South Korea	Suspected altitude sickness	On descent (south side)		
Mohammed Khaled Hossain (Sajal Khaled)	May 21, 2013	35		Bangladesh	Suspected altitude sickness	South Col Camp		
Unknown climber	May 22, 2013			Nepal	Suspected altitude sickness	Camp IV (south side) in tent		
Mingma Tenzing Sherpa	April 2, 2014		Peak Freaks Expedition	Nepal	HAPE	Base Camp		
Mingma Nuru Sherpa	April 18, 2014	46	NBC Everest Expedition	Nepal	2014 Mount Everest Avalanche	Icefall		
Dorji Sherpa	April 18, 2014		NBC Everest Expedition	Nepal	2014 Mount Everest Avalanche	Icefall		
Ang Tshiri Sherpa	April 18, 2014		AAI Everest Expedition 2014	Nepal	2014 Mount Everest Avalanche	Icefall		
Nima Sherpa	April 18, 2014		AAI Everest Expedition 2014	Nepal	2014 Mount Everest Avalanche	Icefall		
Tenzing Chottar Sherpa	April 18, 2014		AAI Everest Expedition 2014	Nepal	2014 Mount Everest Avalanche	Icefall		
Phurba Ongyal Sherpa	April 18, 2014		Adventure Consultants	Nepal	2014 Mount Everest Avalanche	Icefall		
Lapka Tenjing Sherpa	April 18, 2014		Adventure Consultants	Nepal	2014 Mount Everest Avalanche	Icefall		
Chhiring Ongchu Sherpa	April 18, 2014		Adventure Consultants	Nepal	2014 Mount Everest Avalanche	Icefall		
Dorjee Khatri	April 18, 2014		Adventurist Everest Expedition 2014	Nepal	2014 Mount Everest Avalanche	Icefall		
Then Dorjee Sherpa	April 18, 2014		Adventurist Everest Expedition 2014	Nepal	2014 Mount Everest Avalanche	Icefall		
Phur Temba Sherpa	April 18, 2014		Adventurist Everest Expedition 2014	Nepal	2014 Mount Everest Avalanche	Icefall		
Pasang Karma Sherpa	April 18, 2014		Jagged Globe Everest Expedition 2014	Nepal	2014 Mount Everest Avalanche	Icefall		
Ankaji Sherpa	April 18, 2014		Everest Chinese Dream Expedition 2014	Nepal	2014 Mount Everest Avalanche	Icefall		
PemTenji Sherpa	April 18, 2014		Everest Chinese Dream Expedition 2014	Nepal	2014 Mount Everest Avalanche	Icefall		
Aash Bahadur Gurung	April 18, 2014		Everest Chinese Dream Expedition 2014	Nepal	2014 Mount Everest Avalanche	Icefall		
Daniel Paul Fredinburg	April 25, 2015	33	2015 Jagged Globe Everest Expedition	United States	Base Camp avalanche following the April 2015 Nepal earthquake	Base Camp	Recovered	
Marisa Eve Girawong	April 25, 2015	28	H.G. Nuptse Expedition 2015	United States	Base Camp avalanche following the April 2015 Nepal earthquake	Base Camp	Recovered	
Thomas Ely Taplin	April 25, 2015	61	TET Films & Photography	United States	Base Camp avalanche following the April 2015 Nepal earthquake	Base Camp		
Pemba Sherpa	April 25, 2015	19	Adventure Consultants	Nepal	Base Camp avalanche following the April 2015 Nepal earthquake	Base Camp	Recovered	
Dawa Tsering Sherpa	April 25, 2015	33	Adventure Consultants	Nepal	Base Camp avalanche following the April 2015 Nepal earthquake	Base Camp	Recovered	
Maila (Milan) Rai	April 25, 2015	41	Adventure Consultants	Nepal	Base Camp avalanche following the April 2015 Nepal earthquake	Base Camp	Recovered	
Chhimi Dawa Sherpa	April 25, 2015	27	Adventure Consultants	Nepal	Base Camp avalanche following the April 2015 Nepal earthquake	Base Camp	Recovered	
Pema Yishi (Hissi) Sherpa	April 25, 2015	33	Adventure Consultants	Nepal	Base Camp avalanche following the April 2015 Nepal earthquake	Base Camp	Recovered	
Pasang Temba Sherpa	April 25, 2015		Tim Mosedale Everest Expedition (or H.G. Everest Expedition 2015)	Nepal	Base Camp avalanche following the April 2015 Nepal earthquake	Base Camp	Recovered	
Krishna Kumar Rai	April 25, 2015		Tim Mosedale Everest Expedition (or H.G. Everest Expedition 2015)	Nepal	Base Camp avalanche following the April 2015 Nepal earthquake	Base Camp	Recovered	
Tenzing (Tengien) Bhote	April 25, 2015		Tim Mosedale Everest Expedition (or H.G. Everest Expedition 2015)	Nepal	Base Camp avalanche following the April 2015 Nepal earthquake	Base Camp	Recovered	
Renu Fotedar	April 25, 2015	49	First Chinese Women Everest Expedition	Australia; India	Base Camp avalanche following the April 2015 Nepal earthquake	Base Camp	Recovered	
Lhakpa Chhiring Sherpa	April 25, 2015	33	First Chinese Women Everest Expedition	Nepal	Base Camp avalanche following the April 2015 Nepal earthquake	Base Camp	Recovered	
Vinh B Truong	April 25, 2015	48	Trekker	United States; Vietnam	Base Camp avalanche following the April 2015 Nepal earthquake	Base Camp		
Shiva Kumar Shrestha	April 25, 2015	25	Step Up Campaign Everest	Nepal	Base Camp avalanche following the April 2015 Nepal earthquake	Base Camp	Recovered	
Unnamed	April 25, 2015				Base Camp avalanche following the April 2015 Nepal earthquake	Base Camp		
Unnamed	April 25, 2015				Base Camp avalanche following the April 2015 Nepal earthquake	Base Camp		
Jangbu Sherpa	May 1, 2015		Adventure Consultants	Nepal	Base Camp avalanche following the April 2015 Nepal earthquake	Base Camp	Evacuated, succumbed to injuries in hospital	
Charles MacAdams	May 11, 2016	62		Canada	Cardiac event	Base Camp North Side	Recovered	
Ang Phurba Sherpa	May 19, 2016	25		Nepal	Fall	Near summit	Recovered	
Eric Arnold	May 21, 2016	35	Arnold Coster Expeditions	Netherlands	Altitude sickness	South Col / Camp IV	Recovered	
Marisa Elizabeth Strydom	May 22, 2016	34	Arnold Coster Expeditions	Australia; South Africa	Snow blindness, stroke	Near Camp IV	Recovered	
Subhash Pal	May 22, 2016	44	Trekking Camp Nepal	India	Altitude sickness	Around Camp III	Recovered	
Paresh Chandra Nath	May 22, 2016	58	Trekking Camp Nepal	India	Exposure	Balcony	Recovered	
Goutam Ghosh	May 22, 2016	50	Trekking Camp Nepal	India	Exposure	The Balcony	Recovered	
Minn Bahadur Serchan	May 5, 2017	85		Nepal	Heart attack	Base Camp	Recovered	
Roland Yearwood	May 20, 2017	50	Everest Parivar Treks	United States	Altitude sickness	Balcony	Recovered	
Vladimír Štrba	May 21, 2017	48	Everest Hard Way Slovak Expedition 2017	Slovakia	Altitude sickness	Camp IV, in the tent	Recovered	
Francesco Enrico Marchetti	May 21, 2017	54	Expedition Himalaya	Australia	Altitude sickness	Camp IV		
Ravi Kumar	May 21, 2017	27	Arun Treks and Expedition	India	Fall	Balcony	Recovered	
Lam Babu Sherpa	May 14, 2018	45	Seven Summit Treks	Nepal	Disappearance (reportedly suffered from snow blindness)	Above South Col	Not recovered	
Pasang Norbu Sherpa	May 18, 2018	41	7 Summits Club Expedition	Nepal	Stroke	8550m N.E. Ridge		
Gjeorgi Petkov	May 20, 2018	63	Tim Mosedale Everest Expedition Spring 2018	North Macedonia	Cardiac arrest	Above Camp III	Recovered	
Nobukazu Kuriki	May 21, 2018	36	Solo	Japan	Hypothermia, had previously reported "persistent cough and pain" during attempt	Camp II	Recovered	
Damai Sarki Sherpa	May 21, 2018	37	Himalayan Ascent, Seven Summit Treks	Nepal	Fall	Camp II	Evacuated, succumbed to head injury	
Séamus (Shay) Lawless	May 16, 2019	39	Seven Summit Treks	Ireland	Presumed dead after fall	Balcony	Not recovered	
Ravi Thakar	May 17, 2019	28	Seven Summit Treks	India	Altitude sickness	Camp IV	Recovered	
Donald Cash	May 22, 2019	55	Pioneer Adventures	United States	Altitude sickness	Hillary Step		
Nihal Bagwan	May 23, 2019	27	Peak Promotions	India	Exhaustion on descent	Near South Col	Recovered	
Ernst Landgraf	May 23, 2019	65	Kobler & Partners	Austria	Exhaustion on descent	Tibet side at 8600m after summiting		
Anjali S. Kulkarni	May 23, 2019	54	Transcent or Arun Treks	India	Exhaustion on descent	Near Camp IV	Recovered	
Kalpana Dash	May 23, 2019	52	Dreamers Destination Treks	India	Exhaustion on descent	Near Balcony	Recovered	
Kevin Hynes	May 24, 2019	56	360 Expeditions	Ireland	Altitude sickness	North Col	Not recovered	
Dhruba Bista	May 24, 2019		Himalayan Ecstasy (Ski) Treks	Nepal	Exhaustion and altitude sickness	Base Camp following evacuation from Camp III	Recovered	
Robin Haynes Fisher	May 25, 2019	44	Summit Climb/ Everest Parivar Expedition Ltd	United Kingdom	Exhaustion during descent	8750m		
Christopher Jon Kulish	May 27, 2019	62	Climbing the Seven Summits	United States	Cardiac event during descent	South Col		
Puwei Liu	May 12, 2021	55	Seven Summit Treks	United States	Exhaustion, snow blindness	Turned back at Hillary Step (8800m)	Recovered, died in Camp IV	
Abdul Waraich	May 12, 2021	41	Seven Summit Treks	Switzerland	Exhaustion	8350m South Summit	Recovered	
Pemba Tashi Sherpa	May 18, 2021	28	Climbing the Seven Summits	Nepal	Fall	Between Camp I & Camp II	Recovered	
Wong Dorchi Sherpa	May 23, 2021		7 Summits Club	Nepal	Fall	Near Camp IV	Recovered in 2023	
Ngima Tenji Sherpa	April 14, 2022	38	IMG	Nepal	Exhaustion and collapse	'Football Field' near Icefall	Recovered	
Pavel Kostrikin	May 7, 2022	55		Russia	Altitude sickness at Camp II, returned to Camp I	Camp I	Recovered, died in Camp I	
Dipak Mahat	May 12, 2022	32	High 5 Adventures	Nepal	Altitude sickness and excessive bleeding	Camp II	Evacuated, died in hospital	
Lakpa Rita Sherpa	April 12, 2023		Imagine Nepal	Nepal	Crushed under serac	Khumbu Icefall	Not recovered	
Pemba Tenzing Sherpa	April 12, 2023	31	Imagine Nepal	Nepal	Crushed under serac	Khumbu Icefall	Not recovered	
Da Chhiree Sherpa	April 12, 2023		Imagine Nepal	Nepal	Crushed under serac	Khumbu Icefall	Not recovered	
Jonathan Sugarman	May 1, 2023	69	IMG	United States	Illness	Camp II	Recovered	
Phurba Sherpa	May 16, 2023		Nepal Army	Nepal	Illness	Above Camp III	Recovered	
Victor Brinza	May 17, 2023	45	Himalayan Traverse Adventure	Moldova	Illness	Camp IV	Recovered	
Suzanne Leopoldina Jesus	May 18, 2023	59	Glacier Himalaya Treks	India	Illness	Base Camp	Evacuated, died in hospital	
Xuebin Chen	May 18, 2023	52	8K Expedition	China	Fall	South Summit		
Ag Askandar Bin Ampuan Yaacub	May 19, 2023	56	Pioneer Adventure	Malaysia	Illness	South Col	Recovered	
Shrinivas Sainis Dattatraya	May 19, 2023	39	The Seven Summits	Singapore	HACE	8,500m	Not recovered	
Muhammad Hawari Bin Hashim	May 20, 2023	33	Pioneer Adventure	Malaysia	Disappearance (likely accidental death during descent)	Between Camp IV and III	Not recovered	
Jason Bernard Kennison	May 21, 2023	40	Asian Trekking	Australia	Illness	Balcony	Not recovered	
Ang Kami Sherpa	May 21, 2023		Peak Promotion	Nepal	Fall	Camp II	Recovered	
Suhajda Szilárd	May 25, 2023	40	Solo Expedition	Hungary	Disappearance (reportedly suffered from HACE)	Hillary Step	Not recovered	
Ranjit Kumar Shah	May 25, 2023			Nepal	Disappearance	South Summit	Not recovered	
Pieter Swart	May 26, 2023	63	Madison Mountaineering	Canada	Respiratory event	Descending from Camp IV	Recovered	
Lhakpa Nuru Sherpa	June 3, 2023	42		Nepal	Suffered from HAPE, later died in hospital due to cardiopulmonary arrest	South Summit	Evacuated, died in hospital	
Swapnil Adinath Garad	June 7, 2023	36	Asian Trekking	India	Acute mountain sickness	South Summit	Evacuated, died in Kathmandu hospital	
Marista Rita Sinaga	April 28, 2024		Mount Adventures	Indonesia	Unknown	Base Camp	Evacuated, died in hospital	
Usakhjargal Tsedendamba	May 12, 2024	53	8K Expeditions	Mongolia	Exhaustion, low oxygen	Above Camp IV	Recovered	
Purevsuren Lkhagvajav	May 12, 2024	31	8K Expeditions	Mongolia	Exhaustion, low oxygen	The Balcony, Above Camp IV	Recovered	
Daniel Paul Paterson	May 21, 2024	40	8K Expeditions	United Kingdom	Fall	Near Hillary Step	Not recovered	
Pas Tenji Sherpa	May 21, 2024	23	8K Expeditions	Nepal	Fall	Near Hillary Step	Not recovered	
Gabriel Viorel Tabara	May 21, 2024	48	Makalu Adventures	Romania	Found dead in tent	Camp III	Recovered	
Joshua Cheruiyot Kirui	May 22, 2024	40	Seven Summit Treks	Kenya	Fall	Below the Summit	Not recovered	
Nawang Sherpa	May 22, 2024		Seven Summit Treks	Nepal	Disappeared	Below the Summit	Not recovered	
Binod Babu Bastakoti	May 23, 2024		Yeti Mountain Adventure	Nepal	Altitude sickness	Camp IV	Evacuated, died in hospital	
Lanima Sherpa	March 21, 2025	55		Nepal	High Altitude Sickness	Base camp	Recovered, died in transit	
Ngima Dorji Sherpa	May 2025		Seven Summit Treks	Nepal	Heart attack	Base camp	Recovered	
Pen Chhiri Sherpa	May 4, 2025		TAG Nepal	Nepal	Heart attack	Camp I	Evacuated, died in hospital	
Philipp II Santiago	May 15, 2025	45	Snowy Horizon Treks	Philippines	Possible exhaustion	Camp IV	Recovered, died in Camp IV	
Subrata Ghosh	May 15, 2025	45	Snowy Horizon Treks	India	Altitude sickness	Hillary Step	Not Recovered	
Lakpa Tendi Sherpa	May 3, 2026	51	Seven Summit Treks	Nepal	Altitude sickness	Outskirts Base Camp	Recovered, collapsed on the outskirts of Base Camp	
Bijaya Ghimire	May 10, 2026	35	TAG Nepal Treks and Expeditions	Nepal	Altitude sickness	Khumbu Icefall	Recovered, died while ascending to Camp 1	
Phura Gyaljen Sherpa	May 11, 2026	20	Kaitu Expedition	Nepal	Fall	Lhotse Face	Recovered, fell from a ridge below Camp III	
Sandeep Are	May 20, 2026	46	Pioneer Adventures	India	Altitude sickness	South Summit ridge	Recovered, died at Camp II	
Arun Kumar Tiwari	May 21, 2026	53	Pioneer Adventures	India	Altitude sickness	Hillary Step	Not recovered, at the request of family	

== By nationality ==
The table below indicates all the nationalities of the deaths on Mount Everest to date.

Some Mount Everest deaths had dual nationalities. The dual nationalities numbers are included in the table below and are marked by an asterisk (*) next to the country.

Country	Total deaths
Nepal	133
India *	30
United States *	21
United Kingdom *	20
Japan	19
China	12
South Korea	11
Australia *	9
Russia	8
Canada	7
Poland	7
France	6
Germany	6
Czechoslovakia	5
Spain	4
Austria	3
Bulgaria	3
Hungary	3
Ireland	3
Italy	3
New Zealand	3
Switzerland	3
Unknown	3
Czech Republic	2
Denmark	2
Malaysia	2
Mongolia	2
Taiwan	2
Bangladesh	1
Belgium	1
Bolivia *	1
Brazil	1
Chile	1
FR Yugoslavia	1
Kenya	1
Moldova	1
Netherlands	1
North Macedonia	1
Philippines	1
Romania	1
Singapore	1
Indonesia	1
Slovakia	1 (+5)
Slovenia	1
South Africa *	1
Sweden	1
Ukraine	1
Vietnam	1
West Germany	1
Yugoslavia	1

== See also ==
- List of deaths on eight-thousanders
- List of Mount Everest death statistics
- List of Mount Everest records
- List of mountaineering disasters by death toll
- Mount Hood climbing accidents
- Rongbuk Glacier
- The Himalayan Database
- Timeline of climbing Mount Everest
