= Psotka =

Psotka is a surname. Notable people with the surname include:

- Jozef Psotka (1934–1984), Slovak mountaineer
- Zdeněk Psotka (born 1973), Czech footballer
