= Ian Woodall =

British mountaineer (born 1956)

Personal information
- Born: 17 August 1956 (age 69) England, United Kingdom

Climbing career
- Major ascents: Mount Everest

Ian Woodall (born 17 August 1956) is a British mountain climber.

In 1996, Woodall was the leader of the controversial first South African Mount Everest expedition, during which one member of the party died. The expedition reached Camp IV – the last camp before the summit, and 923m below it – on 10 May, but were not directly involved in the disaster that unfolded that day. Following the tragedy the expedition returned to base camp and made a second attempt after a few days rest, achieving the summit on 28 May. Woodall reached the peak by 10 am, four other members of the expedition had done so by 11 am, but Bruce Herrod lagged behind and was the last to reach the peak; from there, at 5 pm, he spoke to the others by radio, but was never heard from again. The expedition was sponsored by Johannesburg newspaper The Sunday Times, but its support of the expedition was later withdrawn.

In late May 1998, Woodall together with his climbing partner Cathy O'Dowd were again on Everest when they encountered Francys Arsentiev, half-conscious and unable to move independently. They called off their own attempt to reach the summit and tried to help her for more than one hour but because of her condition, the location, and the cold weather they were finally forced to abandon her and begin descending. Arsentiev later died on the mountain, with climbers who encountered her unable to help.

In 2007, Woodall initiated and led an expedition, The Tao of Everest, with the purpose of burying the bodies of Arsentiev and also of Green Boots, who had died during the 1996 Mount Everest disaster. Bad weather delayed the attempt, and on 23 May 2007, Woodall and Phuri Sherpa were only able to recover Arsentiev's body, and after a brief ceremony, drop her body off the North Face to join others in their mountain grave. Woodall and O'Dowd were married in 2001. They later separated, and Woodall now lives in the south east of England.

== Controversy regarding the 1996 expedition ==
American journalist Jon Krakauer, who was a member in New Zealander Rob Hall's commercial Everest expedition in 1996, was extremely critical of Woodall's personality and behaviour in his best-selling book Into Thin Air. His criticisms of Woodall include:

- His dictatorial and manipulative character that had caused three experienced South African climbers Edmund February, Andy de Klerk, and Andy Hackland, and the expedition doctor, Charlotte Noble, to resign from the expedition.
- Lying about his climbing credentials prior to the expedition, having had no previous experience on 8,000-meter peaks.
- Falsifying his military service by claiming that he had commanded the elite "Long Range Mountain Reconnaissance Unit" (which had never existed), of the British army, and had served as an instructor at the Royal Military Academy Sandhurst; none of which was true. There is, however, the famed World War II Long Range Desert Group from which he may have borrowed the name.
- Insisting that expedition member Andy de Klerk, who held dual citizenship, enter Nepal on his South African passport or he would not be allowed on the expedition. It turned out that Woodall himself did not even hold a South African passport, and, according to de Klerk, "He's not even a South African citizen—the guy's a Brit, and he entered Nepal on his British passport."
- Facing international scandal, Woodall banished Ken Vernon and Richard Shorey, two reporters from the expedition's sponsor, The Sunday Times, whose presence and accompaniment were required as part of the sponsorship contract. Woodall later had a "blood-chilling exchange" with Ken Owen, an editor from The Sunday Times in which Ian reportedly threatened to murder him, which precipitated The Sunday Times' withdrawal of support.
- Refusing to co-ordinate the mountain traffic and co-operate with other expeditions to avoid gridlock on the summit ridge, declaring, "The South Africans would go to the top whenever they damn well please, and anyone who didn't like it could bugger off." (This was probably on 10 May, which was Hall and Scott Fischer's shared summit date). Hall responded to Woodall's comment by saying, "I don't want to be anywhere near the upper mountain when those punters are up there." Hall, Fischer and six others lost their lives during the expedition, largely because of bad weather and a series of events precipitated by a gridlock on the upper mountain. There is no evidence, however, that the South African team's presence, directly or indirectly, caused or significantly exacerbated the traffic problems on that day.
- After the 10 May disaster, Woodall refused to lend the distressed Hall team the South African expedition's powerful radio to co-ordinate the rescue efforts, despite being aware that people were dying on the summit.
