= Deysel =

Deysel is a surname. Notable people with the surname include:

- Deshun Deysel (born 1970), South African mountaineer and businesswoman who participated in the South African Everest Expedition, 1996
- Jean Deysel (born 1985), South African rugby union player
- Johan Deysel (born 1991), Namibian rugby union player
