= Srobarova =

Srobarova may refer to:

- Šrobárová, a village in Komarno District, Slovakia
- Gymnázium Šrobárova, a high school in Košice, Slovakia
