= Marko Lihteneker =

Slovenian ski mountaineer and mountain climber

Personal information
- Born: September 21, 1959
- Died: May 21, 2005 (aged 45) Mount Everest

Sport
- Sport: Skiing
- Club: GRS Celje

Marko Lihteneker (September 21, 1959 – May 5, 2005) was a Slovenian ski mountaineer and mountain climber.

Lihteneker, at this time member of the GRS Celje took part in the 2004 World Championship of Ski Mountaineering in Aran Valley, where he placed sixth in the relay race event together with Tone Karničar, Žiga Karničar and Jernej Karničar. In May 2005, Lihteneker died in part due to oxygen problems around 8,800 m (28,871 ft) on his descent of Mount Everest after leaving the last camp. He was last seen alive a few metres from the summit, when he tried to solve problems with his oxygen system. His body was found by Chinese porters. The Memorial Staneta Veninška in Marka Lihtenekerja race is named to honour him.

== See also ==
- List of people who died climbing Mount Everest
