= Gymnázium Šrobárova =

Coordinates: 48°43′08″N 21°15′05″E

IB Gymnázium, Šrobárova 1
- Šrobárka
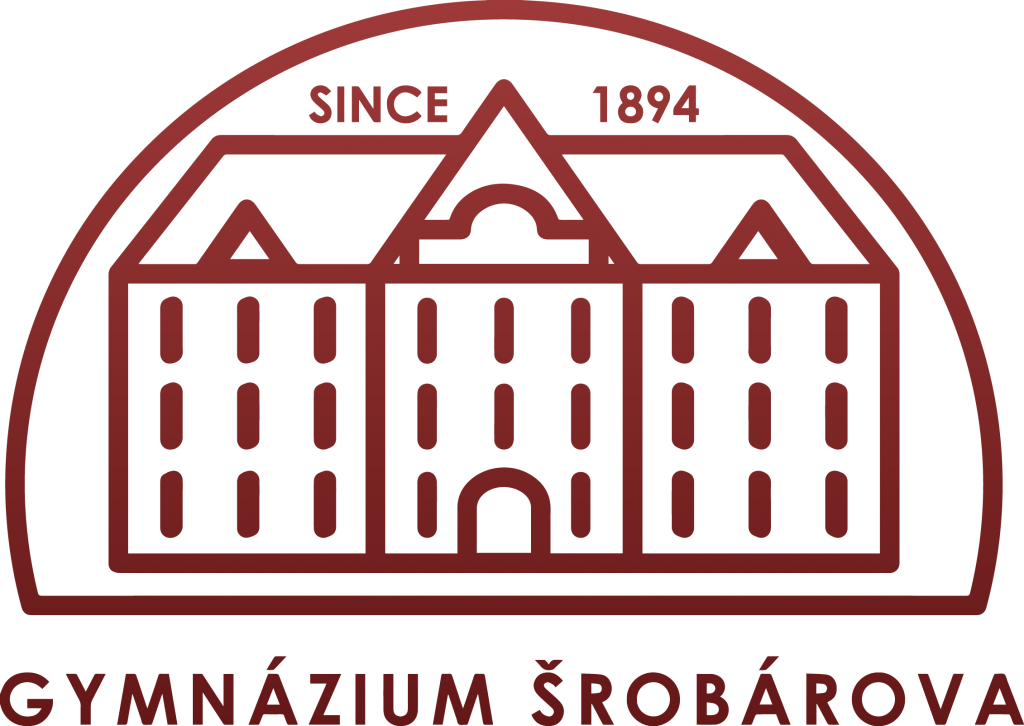

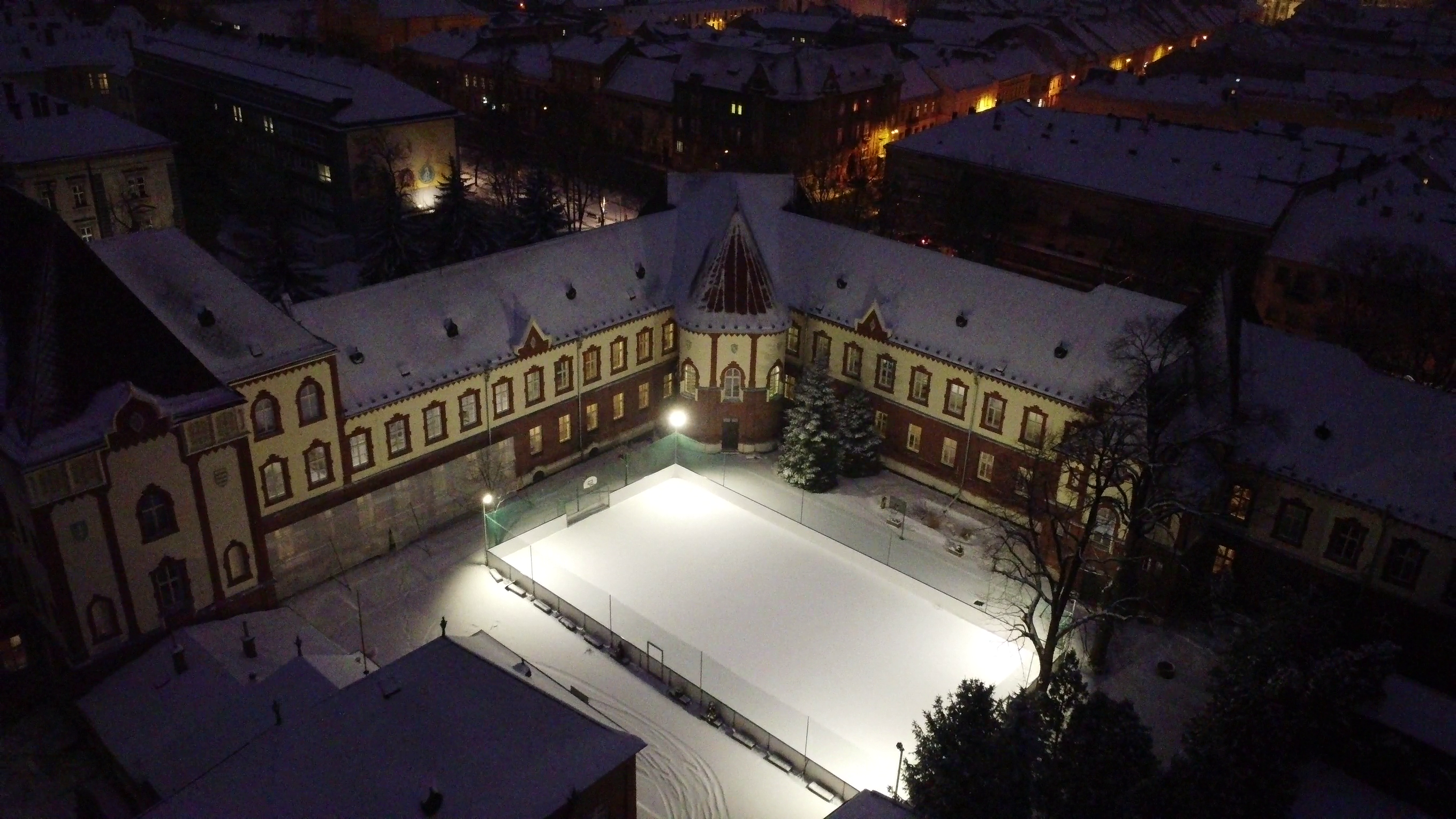
- IB Gymnasium Srobarova Kosice backyard at night

Location
- Šrobárova 1 Košice, Košice Region; Slovakia

Information
- Type: Public upper-secondary - Gymnasium
- Motto: Sapere aude
- Established: 1891
- Principal: PaedDr. Zlatica Frankovičová
- Former names: 1891 – 1918 Vyššia dievčenská škola (Állami felsőbb-leányiskola); 1919 – 1928 Československé reformné reálne gymnázium; 1929 – 1938 Štátne dievčenské reálne gymnázium; 1938 – 1944 Maďarské kráľovské štátne dievčenské gymnázium (A Kassai Magyar Királyi állami Hunfalvy János gimnázium); 1945 – 1948 Štátne dievčenské gymnázium; 1948 – 1953 II. gymnázium v Košiciach Šrobárova 46; 1956 – 1960 II. a III. jedenásťročná stredná škola; 1960 – 1969 Stredná všeobecnovzdelávacia škola; 1969 – 1990 Gymnázium Šrobárova 46; 1990 – dnes Gymnázium Šrobárova 1
- Notable alumni: Jozef Urban · Richard Raši
- Website: srobarka.sk

The IB Gymnázium Šrobárova is one of the oldest high schools in Košice, Slovakia. Gymnázium provides upper-secondary education for over 600 students.

== History ==
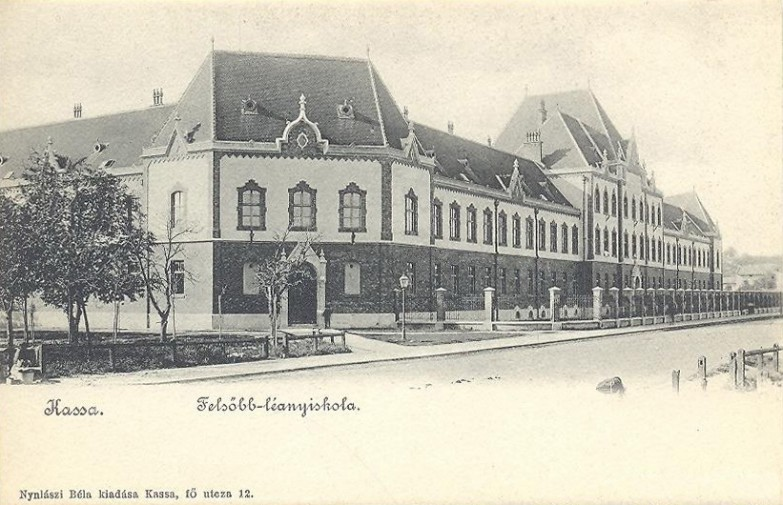

It was founded in 1891 as a State Girls High School (Állami felsőbb leányiskola). The first school leaving exams (maturita) took part June 23, 1923. After the fall of the Austro-Hungarian Empire, the government of Czechoslovakia altered the school into a college-preparatory high school.

== Architecture ==
The school seats in a complex of school buildings from 1896 on the western edge of city center. Design of school complex came from Gyula Pártos, the Hungarian architect. The construction was led by company of Arpád and Gejza Jakab. Complex is designed in the Secession style.

== Notable alumni ==
- Jozef Urban
- Peter Schutz - journalist
- prof. JUDr. Alexander Bröstl, CSc.
- Zora Kolínska
- Tomáš Janovic
- Jozef Psotka
- Pavol Jarčuška
- Mária Medvecká
- Dušan Grúň
- MUDr. Richard Raši, PhD.
- Ing. Rastislav Trnka
