= 1996 Indo-Tibetan Border Police expedition to Mount Everest =

Expedition to Mount Everest in which 3 people died

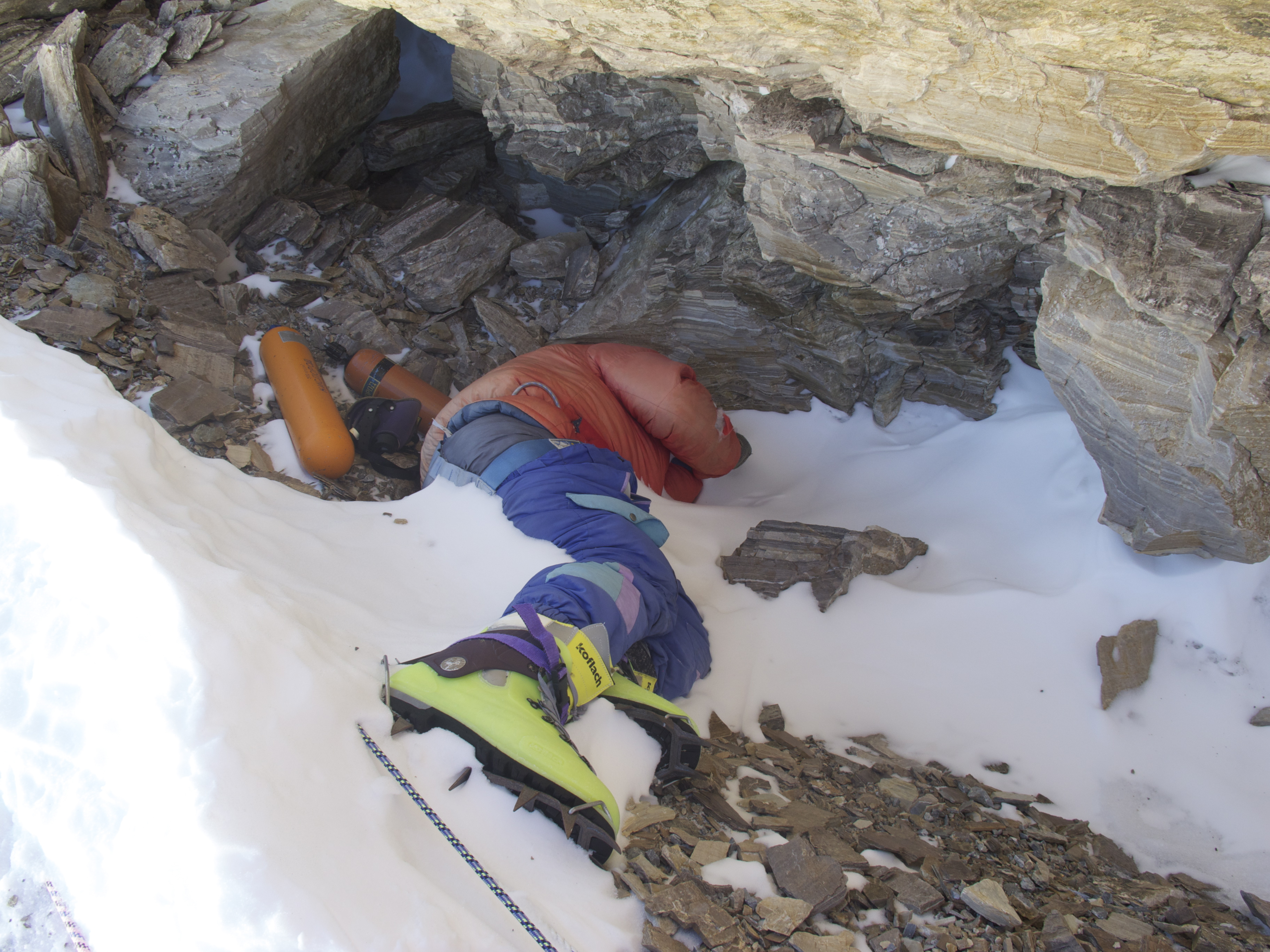
Photo of the body of Dorje Morup, commonly nicknamed Green Boots

The 1996 Indo-Tibetan Border Police Expedition to Mount Everest in May 1996 was a climbing expedition mounted by the Indo-Tibetan Border Police (ITBP) to reach the summit of Mount Everest. The first party of the season on the Northeast face, it fixed climbing ropes and broke trail for subsequent parties. Three members of the ITBP expedition continued on to the summit; none returned, adding three deaths to five among two commercial parties spread over the Southeast and Northeast routes up the mountain that became known as the 1996 Mount Everest climbing disaster.

The expedition was led by Commandant Mohinder Singh and is credited by some as being the first Indian ascent of Everest from the North Side.

== The expedition ==
On 10 May 1996, Subedar Tsewang Samanla, Lance Naik Dorje Morup, and Head Constable Tsewang Paljor were part of a six-man summit attempt from the North Side. The summit team did not have any sherpas to guide them. They were the first team of the season to go up the North Face. It would be their responsibility to fix the ropes during ascent and break the trail to the top. The team was caught in the blizzard above Camp IV. While three of the six members turned down, Samanla, Paljor, and Morup decided to go for the summit. Samanla was an accomplished mountaineer who had summited Everest in 1984 and Kanchenjunga in 1991. The first group was Paljor, Samanla, Morup, Jodh Singh, and Harbhajan Singh. Frostbitten, Jodh Singh and Harbhajan Singh returned to their base camp, and Samanla, Morup, and Paljor remained.

At around 18:00 (15:45 Nepal Time), the three climbers radioed to their expedition leader that they had arrived at the summit. While the Indian camp was jubilant in their celebrations, some of the other mountaineers at Base Camp had already expressed their reservations about the timing, which was quite late in the day to be on the summit. There is also a dispute whether the three had actually reached the summit. Jon Krakauer claims that the climbers were at 8,700 m (28,550 ft), roughly 150 m (500 ft) short of the topmost point. Due to bad visibility and thick clouds which obscured the summit, the climbers believed they had reached the top. This also explains why the climbers did not run into the teams that summited from the South Side.

The three climbers left an offering of prayer flags, khatas, and pitons. Samanla, the summit team leader, decided to spend extra time for religious ceremonies and instructed the other two climbers to begin their descent. There was no radio contact after that. Back at the camps below, anxious team members saw two headlamps moving just above the second step (8,570 m/28,120 ft). None of the three managed to come back to high camp at 8,320 m (27,300 ft).

== Possible sightings by Japanese climbers ==
On 11 May 1996, on the morning after Samanla, Paljor, and Morup had made their push for the summit and encountered the blizzard, a Japanese team from the Fukuoka expedition started its final ascent from the north side. The Fukuoka climbers would report seeing other climbers during their summit push—not unexpected given the number of climbers camped or climbing on the final 550 m (1,800 ft) of the mountain that day.

(All Times Beijing Time)

- 06:15 Hiroshi Hanada and Eisuke Shigekawa (Fukuoka first attack party) departed Camp 6 (8,300 m/27,230 ft). Three Sherpas had left in advance.
- 08:45 Radio call to Base Camp to report nearing the ridge. Just below the ridge they met two climbers coming down a fixed rope. On the ridge another climber appeared before the first snowfield. They could not be identified, because all were wearing goggles and oxygen masks under hoods. The Fukuoka party, having no knowledge of the missing Indians, thought they were Taiwanese party members.

In Krakauer's account, the lone climber (either Paljor or Morup) was still moaning and frostbitten from exposure over the night. The Japanese climbers ignored him and set out for the summit. After ascending the second step, they ran into the other two climbers, probably Samanla with either Paljor or Morup "[one] apparently close to death, the other crouching in the snow," Krakauer writes, "no words were passed, no water, food or oxygen exchanged hands. The Japanese moved on ..."

- 11:39 Radio call to Base Camp to report passing the Second Step (8,600 m/28,220 ft). They then saw two climbers at a distance of about 15 m from the ridge. Again, identification was impossible.
- 15:07 Hanada, Shigekawa, and three Sherpas reached the summit.
- 15:30 Start descent. After passing the triangle snowfield they saw some unidentifiable object above the Second Step. Below the First Step, they saw one person on the fixed rope. Shigekawa therefore stopped and radioed Base Camp. As he started moving again he met someone, who had possibly been on the fixed rope, standing nearby. They exchanged greetings, but Shigekawa was still unable to identify him. The Japanese climbers' oxygen was just enough to return to Camp 6.
- 16:00 (approx) An Indian party member told the Fukuoka ABC that three men were missing. The Fukuoka party attempted to dispatch three Sherpas from Camp 6 to rescue the Indians, but disappearing daylight prevented their departure. Their request to Indian party members at Camp 6 to join a rescue was refused. Also, their offer of a radio so that the Indian party could talk to their leader in ABC was declined.

Initially, the apparent indifference of the Japanese climbers was dumbfounding, as the Indian expedition leader said later, "The Japanese had initially pledged to help the search for the missing Indians. But hours later, they pressed on with their attempt to reach the summit, despite bad weather." The Japanese team reached the summit at 11:45 (Nepal Time). By the time the Japanese climbers descended, one of the two Indians was already dead, and the other near death. They could not find any trace of the third climber further down.

The Japanese team denied that they had ever encountered the dying climbers on the way up.

Captain Kohli, an official of the Indian Mountaineering Federation, who earlier had denounced the Japanese, later retracted his claim that the Japanese had reported meeting the Indians on 10 May.

"The ITBP accepted the Fukuoka party statements that they neither abandoned nor refused to help the Indians." The ITBP's director general "commented that a misunderstanding arose from communication difficulties between Indian attack party members and their Base Camp."

== Green Boots ==
The body nicknamed Green Boots, which was long-believed to be the remains of Indian climber Tsewang Paljor, served as a marker for subsequent climbers alongside the limestone alcove where it had lain. In 2014, Green Boots was moved to a less conspicuous location by the Chinese. In 2026, Indo-Tibetan Border Police announced that DNA-based testing and survivor accounts identified Green Boots as Lance Naik Dorje Morup.

== See also ==
- List of Mount Everest expeditions
- List of Indian summiters of Mount Everest
- List of Mount Everest summiteers by frequency
- List of Mount Everest records of India
- List of Mount Everest records
- List of people who died climbing Mount Everest
