= Francys Arsentiev =

American mountaineer (1958–1998)

- Born: Francys Yarbro; January 18, 1958; Honolulu, Hawaii, U.S.
- Died: May 24, 1998 (aged 40); Mount Everest, Nepal
- Occupation: Mountaineer
- Known for: First U.S. woman to climb Mount Everest without help of oxygen; died on the descent.
- Spouses: John Abel (m. 1977; div. 1978) Sergei Arsentiev (m. 1992; their deaths 1998)

Francys Arsentiev (January 18, 1958 – May 24, 1998) was the first American woman to reach the summit of Mount Everest without using bottled oxygen, on May 22, 1998. She and her husband, Sergei Arsentiev, both died during the descent. Her body was visible to climbers until 2007, when it was moved from view.

== Climbing ==
In 1992, Francys married Russian climber Sergei Arsentiev. She had a son, Paul Distefano, from a previous relationship. The Arsentievs climbed many peaks, including the first ascent of Peak 5800m in Russia, which they named Peak Goodwill, as well as Denali via the West Buttress. Arsentiev became the first U.S. woman to ski down Elbrus, and she summited its east and west peaks. By this time, she had developed an interest in becoming the first U.S. woman to summit Everest without the use of supplemental oxygen. Her son later said, "I don't know why she decided she had to do it without oxygen, but I think she felt like she needed to prove something."

== Everest ==
=== Initial attempts ===
In May 1998, Francys and Sergei Arsentiev arrived at Mount Everest base camp. On May 17, they ascended from Advance Base Camp to the North Col, and the following day they reached 7,700 metres (25,300 ft) as 21 other climbers reached the summit of Everest from the North. On May 19, they climbed to 8,203 metres (26,913 ft) (Camp 6). Sergei reported by radio that they were in good shape and were going to start their summit attempt on May 20 at 1:00am. On May 20, after spending the night at Camp 4, they started their summit attempt but turned around at the First Step when their headlamps failed. On May 21, they again stayed at Camp 6, after ascending only 50–100 metres (160–330 ft) before turning around.

=== Summit and aftermath ===
After these two aborted attempts on the summit, they began their final ascent on May 22. Due to the absence of oxygen supplementation at such high altitude, the two moved slowly and summited dangerously late in the day, forcing them to spend yet another night above 8,000 metres (26,000 ft). During the course of the evening the two became separated. Sergei made his way down to camp the following morning, but found that his wife had not yet arrived. Realizing she had to be somewhere dangerously high, he set off to find her, carrying an oxygen tank and medicine.

Details of what happened next are uncertain, but the most plausible accounts suggest that on the morning of May 23, Francys Arsentiev was encountered by an Uzbek team that was climbing the final few hundred meters to the summit. She appeared to be half-conscious, affected by oxygen deprivation and frostbite. As she was unable to move on her own, they attended to her with oxygen and carried her down as far as they could, until, depleted of their own oxygen, they became too fatigued to continue the effort. Francys was still alive. As the Uzbek climbers made their way down to camp that evening, they encountered Sergei Arsentiev on his way back up to her; this was the last time he was seen alive.

=== Death ===
On the morning of May 24, Briton Ian Woodall, South African Cathy O'Dowd, and several more Uzbeks encountered Francys Arsentiev while on their way to the summit. She was found where she had been left the evening before. Sergei Arsentiev's ice axe and rope were identified nearby, but he was nowhere to be found. Both Woodall and O'Dowd called off their own summit attempts and tried to help Francys for more than an hour, but because of her poor condition, the perilous location, and freezing weather, they were forced to abandon her and descend to camp. She died as they found her, lying on her side, still clipped onto the guide rope. She was aged 40, with one son. Her corpse has been nicknamed "Sleeping Beauty".

The mysterious disappearance of her husband was solved the following year when Jake Norton, a member of the 1999 "Mallory and Irvine" expedition, discovered Sergei's body lower on the mountain face, apparently dead from a fall while attempting to rescue his wife.

=== "The Tao of Everest" ===
There are many dead bodies on Everest, left there because it is extremely difficult and hazardous to retrieve them and carry them down.

Woodall initiated and led an expedition in 2007, "The Tao of Everest", with the purpose of returning to the mountain to bury the bodies of Francys Arsentiev and a then unidentified climber ("Green Boots"), both of whom were plainly visible from the nearby climbing route. Francys Arsentiev's body was visible to climbers for nine years, from her death, May 24, 1998, to May 23, 2007. On May 23, 2007, Woodall was able to locate Arsentiev's body, and after a brief ritual moved her to a lower, out of view, location on the face. In 2014, "Green Boots" was moved to a less conspicuous location by a Chinese team.

== See also ==
- List of people who died climbing Mount Everest
- Timeline of climbing Mount Everest
- Junko Tabei (Japan), the first woman to reach the summit of Mount Everest (16 May 1975).
- Wanda Rutkiewicz (Poland), the first European woman to reach the summit of Mount Everest (16 October 1978).
- Hannelore Schmatz (Germany), the first woman to die on Mount Everest (2 October 1979).
- Sharon Wood (Canada), the first North American woman to reach the summit of Mount Everest (20 May 1986).
- Stacy Allison (U.S.), the first U.S. woman to reach the summit of Mount Everest (29 September 1988).
- Melissa Arnot (U.S.), the first U.S. woman to reach the summit of Mount Everest and survive the descent without bottled oxygen (2016).
