= Rodrigo Raineri =

Brazilian mountaineer and paraglider (1969–2024)

- Born: Rodrigo Chaddad Raineri; 9 May 1969; Ibitinga, São Paulo, Brazil
- Died: 4 July 2024 (aged 55); Askoli, Gilgit-Baltistan, Pakistan
- Cause of death: Paragliding accident
- Education: State University of Campinas
- Occupations: Computer engineer, businessman, speaker, consultant
- Known for: First Brazilian to summit Mount Everest three times
- Children: 1

Rodrigo Chaddad Raineri (9 May 1969 – 4 July 2024) was a Brazilian mountain climber and businessman.

Raineri was born in Ibitinga on 9 May 1969. He graduated with a degree in engineering from Unicamp, and worked as a graduate school professor of ecotourism at Senac.

Raineri started climbing at 19. He had extensive experience in rock climbing, ice climbing and high mountain ascents. He was the first Brazilian to summit Mount Everest three times, and would make six expeditions to the Everest. He led 11 expeditions to Aconcagua, reaching the summit six times. With Vitor Negrete, he climbed the South Face of Aconcagua, the only Brazilian pair to do so.

In 2009, he added paragliding to his repertory, flying down from the summit of Mont Blanc.

As an entrepreneur, Raineri provided corporate lectures and behavioral training, relating his mountaineering experience to the corporate world. He has worked since 1994 as an adventure sports and safety instructor. He is the co-author, along with Diogo Schelp, of No Teto do Mundo [At the Roof of the World] (Leya, 2012; ISBN 978-8580441253).

Rodrigo Raineri died in a paragliding accident in Pakistan’s Gilgit-Baltistan region, on 4 July 2024. He was 55. During the ongoing K2 climbing expedition, Raineri's group was on a leg to the K2 base camp. Raineri opted to paraglide from Askoli to Jhula camp when the incident occurred in the Askoli area. At the time of the accident, Raineri did not have a paragliding permit, and action was taken against Alpine Adventure Guides Pakistan, the tour operator for his trip.

== See also ==
- Vitor Negrete (climbing partner who died on Everest)
