= Cathy O'Dowd =

South African mountaineer (born 1968)

Personal information
- Born: 1968 (age 57–58)

Cathy O'Dowd (born 1968) is a South African rock climber, mountaineer, author and motivational speaker. She was the first woman to reach the summit of Mount Everest from both the south and north sides on 25 May 1996 and 29 May 1999, respectively.

O’Dowd grew up in Johannesburg, South Africa, and attended St. Andrew's School for Girls. She began climbing while at the university. When she was 21, she took part in her first mountain expedition, to the Ruwenzori in Central Africa.

== Everest expeditions ==
=== Southeast ridge route ===
Towards the end of 1995, O'Dowd was finishing a master's degree in Media Studies at Rhodes University when she applied for and got a place on the First South African Everest Expedition. On 11 May 1996, eight climbers died in a severe blizzard on their descent from the summit on the south side. This included a climbing guide and the leaders of two expeditions, American Scott Fischer and the New Zealander Rob Hall. O'Dowd was at the high camp just below the southeast ridge preparing to summit with her expedition when the blizzard struck, forcing the team to delay the summit attempt. She finally reached the summit on 25 May 1996. One member of the South African party, 37-year-old Bruce Herrod, died on the descent. His body was discovered the following year by an Indonesian expedition party led by Anatoli Boukreev.

=== North ridge route ===
In 1998 she attempted the north side of Everest, where George Mallory had disappeared in 1924. Her attempt ended hours from the summit when she came across Francys Arsentiev, an American climber who had collapsed. She and British climber Ian Woodall attempted to help her for over an hour but were forced to turn around and descend, leaving Arsentiev behind. Two of the Sherpas went on to the summit. She described this decision to Michael Buerk on the BBC Radio 4 programme 'The Choice' aired in November 2009. In 1999 she returned, and on this occasion succeeded, becoming the first woman to climb Everest from both north and south sides. In 2000, she became the fourth woman to climb Lhotse, the world's fourth highest mountain.

=== East face route ===
In 2003, she made an unsuccessful attempt at a new route up the east face of Everest.

== Other expeditions ==
In the spring of 2004 she joined British woman Rona Cant and Norwegian Per-Thore-Hansen on a dog-sled expedition of 650 kilometres (400 mi) through the Norwegian Arctic, from Styggedalen to Nordkapp.

Cathy O'Dowd has climbed mountains across southern and central Africa, in South America, in the Alps and in the Himalaya. She remains an active mountaineer, rock-climber and skier.

She married the First South African Everest Expedition leader Ian Woodall in 2001 and lives in Andorra in the Pyrenees.

== Books ==
- Everest: Free To Decide - Cathy O'Dowd & Ian Woodall (Struik Publishers 1998) ISBN 1-86872-101-9
- Just for the love of it - Cathy O'Dowd (Free To Decide Publishers 2001) ISBN 0-620-24782-7

== See also ==
- List of Mount Everest summiters by number of times to the summit
- List of 20th-century summiters of Mount Everest
