= Vitor Negrete =

Brazilian mountaineer

Personal information
- Born: 13 November 1967
- Died: 19 May 2006 (aged 38)

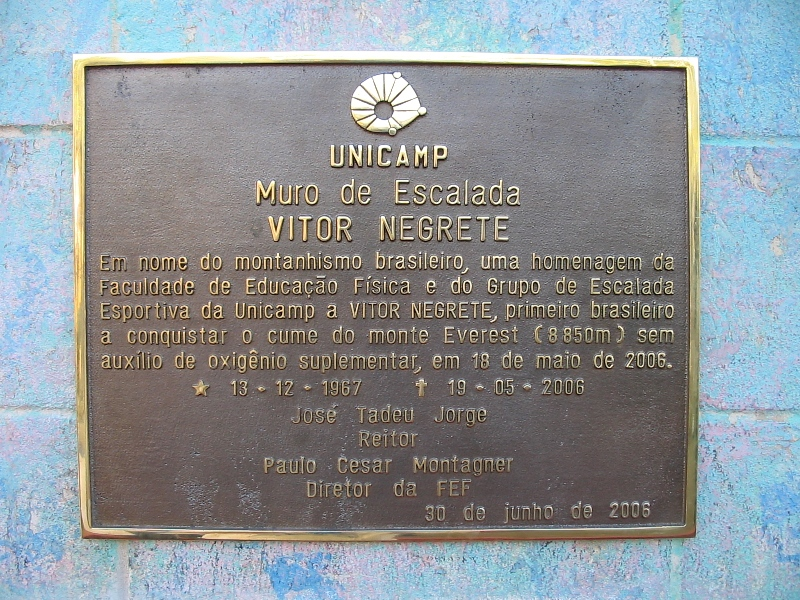
Plaque acknowledging Negrete

Vítor Negrete (13 November 1967 – 19 May 2006) was a climber and the first Brazilian to reach the summit of Mount Everest without supplemental oxygen. He was also an adventure racer beginning in 2001. Among many other adventures, he had crossed the Amazon rainforest and traveled from São Paulo state to the southernmost part of Argentina– Tierra del Fuego, Patagonia– on a bicycle. As a UNICAMP researcher in food engineering, he helped to introduce pre-industrialized food to poor communities in the Vale do Ribeira, south of the state of São Paulo. He reached the summit of Mount Everest on May 18, 2006, without supplemental oxygen, and died on the descent.

== Climbs ==
In 2005 Negrete summited Everest, using oxygen after Camp 3. He also summited Aconcagua in the Andes of South America.

== Death on Everest ==
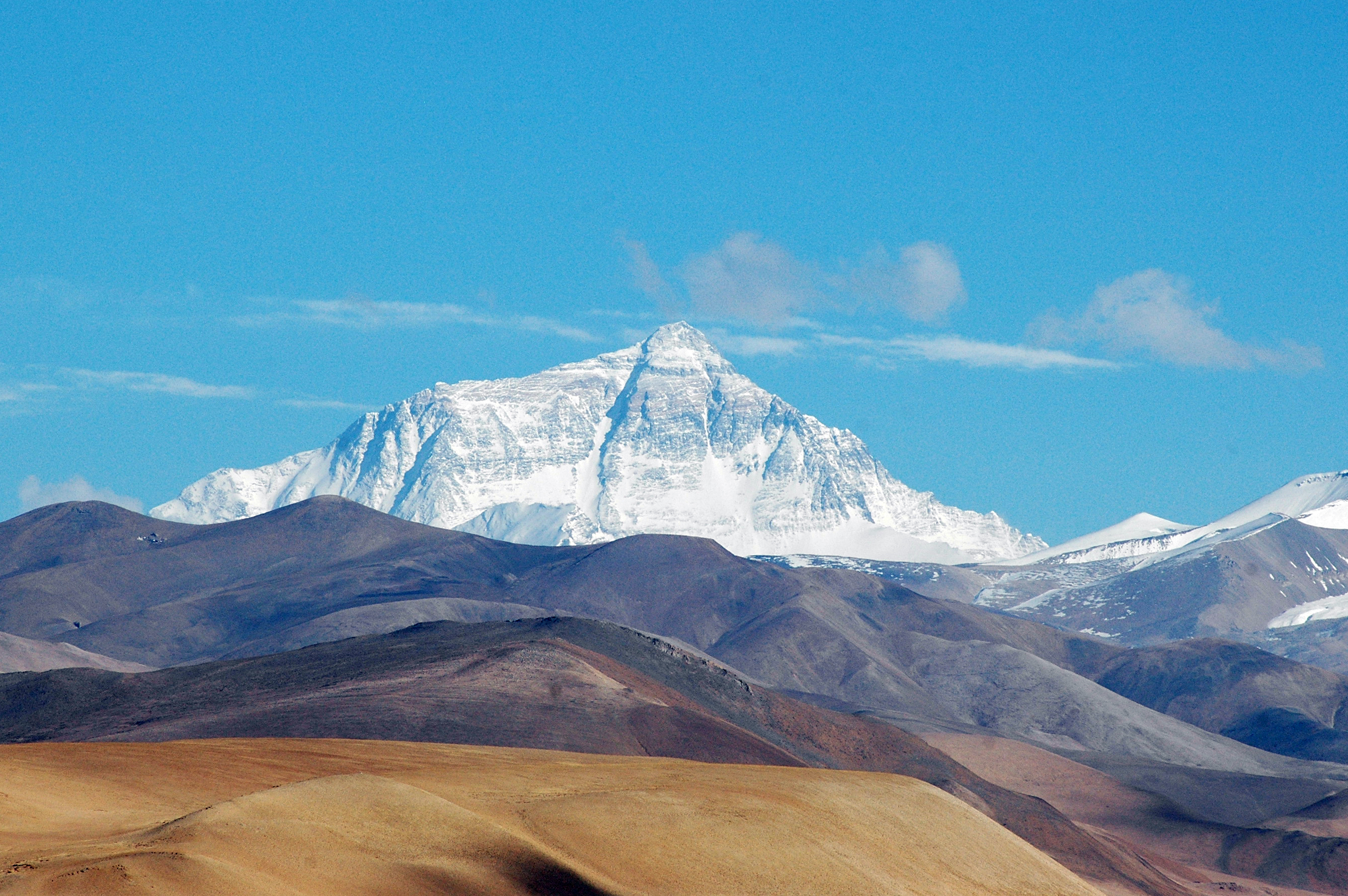
Everest's North face

In May 2006, Negrete and his Brazilian teammate, Rodrigo Raineri, attempted to climb Mount Everest following the north ridge route without the aid of oxygen. On May 16, they learned that, while making a summit bid, David Sharp, a fellow Asian Trekking member, had died on the mountain.

On May 17, resting at Base Camp after a failed summit bid, Negrete told Raineri: “I am going tonight, without O2, without a Sherpa and without a sat-phone, since the batteries of the one I have are almost gone. I am going completely on my own. I promise I’ll be careful." He called for help on the way down from the summit, which he had reached by noon on May 18. His Sherpa guide, Ang Dawa Sherpa, went immediately up from Camp III and helped him back down, where he died soon afterward.

== See also ==
- List of people who died climbing Mount Everest
- List of Mount Everest summiters by number of times to the summit
