= Green Boots =

Formerly unidentified deceased mountain climber

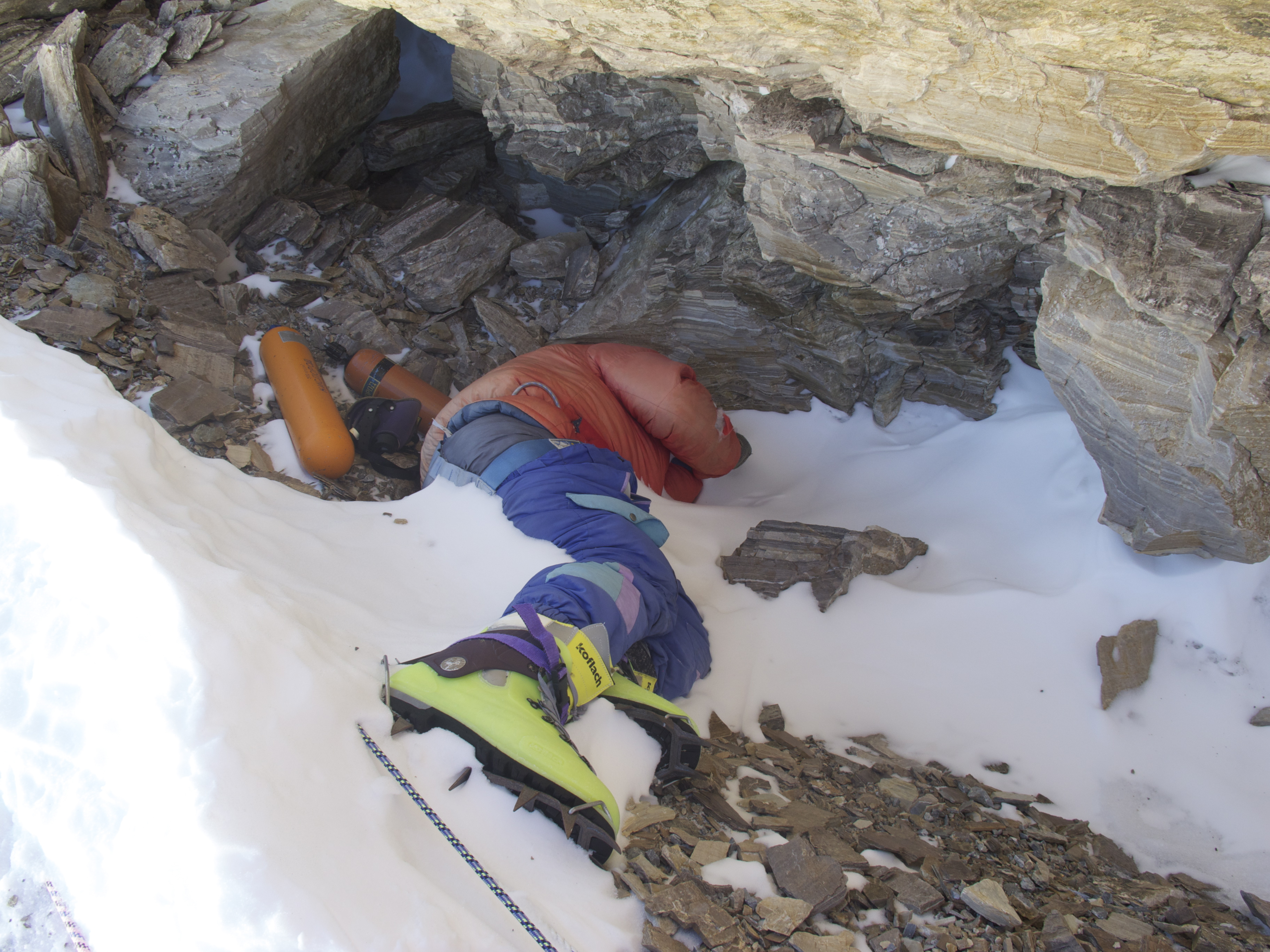
'Green Boots' on Everest taken May 2010

Green Boots is the body of a formerly unidentified climber that became a landmark on the main Northeast ridge route of Mount Everest. There were several theories regarding the body's identity; the most popular claiming the body belonged to an Indian member of the Indo-Tibetan Border Police expedition (ITBP) who died as part of the 1996 climbing disaster on the mountain wearing neon green Koflach mountaineering boots. All expeditions from the north side encountered the body curled in the limestone alcove cave at 8,500 m (27,900 ft) until it was moved away from the main climbing route in 2014.

In 2026, the body was identified by the Indo-Tibetan Border Police as belonging to Lance Naik Dorje Morup, an ITBP climber who died in the 1996 disaster. Prior to this, the body was widely believed to have been of fellow climber Tsewang Paljor.

The ITBP announced a plan to retrieve Morup's body by October 2026.

== History ==
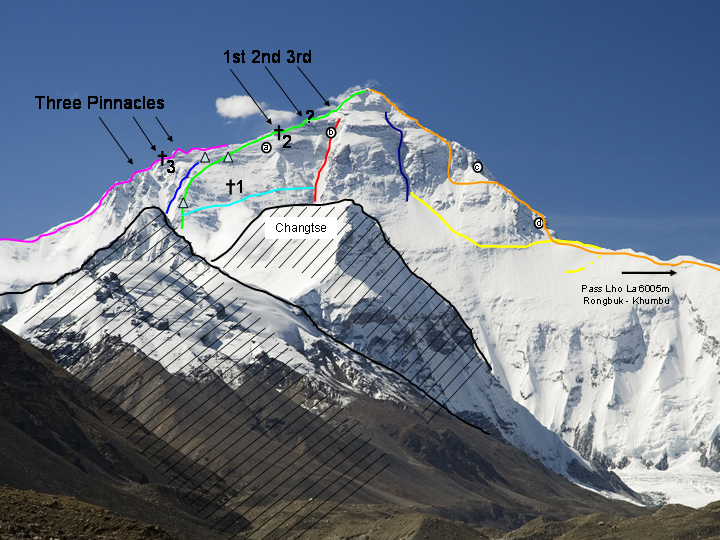
The Three Steps on the north route is marked alongside the cave which is marked with a †_{2}.

The first recorded video footage of Green Boots was filmed by British filmmaker and climber Matt Dickinson in May 1996. The footage was included in the Brian Blessed documentary Summit Fever. The film's narration describes the unidentified climber as from India.

Over time, the corpse became known as a landmark on the north route. In 2006, British mountaineer David Sharp was found in a hypothermic state in Green Boots' Cave by climber Mark Inglis and his party. Inglis continued his ascent after radioing for advice on how to help Sharp, which he could not provide. Sharp died of extreme cold some hours later. Approximately three dozen other climbers would have passed by the dying man that day; it has been suggested that those who noticed him mistook Sharp for Green Boots and, therefore, paid little attention.

In 2014, Green Boots was moved to a less conspicuous location by members of a Chinese expedition—likely by the China Tibet Mountaineering Association, which manages the north side of Everest.

== Possible identities ==
=== Dorje Morup ===
A 1997 article titled "The Indian Ascent of Qomolungma by the North Ridge" published by P.M. Das in the Himalayan Journal, states that the body was that of Lance Naik Dorje Morup. Das wrote that two climbers had been spotted descending by the light of their head-torches at 19:30, although they were soon lost from sight. The next day the leader of the second summit group of the expedition radioed base camp that they had encountered Morup moving slowly between the First and Second Steps. Das wrote that Morup "had refused to put on gloves over his frost-bitten hands" and "was finding difficulty in unclipping his safety carabiner at anchor points." According to Das, the Japanese team assisted in transitioning him to the next stretch of rope.

Sometime later, the Japanese group discovered the body of Tsewang Smanla above the Second Step. On the return trip, the group found that Morup was progressing slowly. Morup is believed to have died in the late afternoon of 11 May.

A second ITBP group also came across the bodies of Smanla and Morup on their return from the summit. Das wrote that they encountered Morup "lying under the shelter of a boulder near their line of descent, close to Camp 6" with intact clothing and his rucksack by his side. In 2026, the ITBP identified Morup as Green Boots. The ITBP opened a tender for the recovery of his body with a deadline of October 2026. Morup was a less popular theory about Green Boots' identity prior to his formal identification.

=== Tsewang Paljor ===
Eight climbers died in the Everest disaster of 1996: five climbers from the Adventure Consultants and Mountain Madness expeditions on the southeast route, and three fatalities among the Indo-Tibetan Border Police (ITBP) expedition from India who perished on the northeast route. Green Boots was commonly believed to be Indian ITBP climber Tsewang Paljor, who was wearing green Koflach boots on the day he and two others in his party attempted to summit. The ITBP was led by Commandant Mohinder Singh and was the first Indian ascent of Everest from the east side.

On 10 May 1996, Subedar Tsewang Smanla, Lance Naik Dorje Morup, and Head Constable Tsewang Paljor were caught in a blizzard just short of the summit. While three of the six-member team turned back down, Smanla, Morup, and Paljor decided to go for the summit. At around 15:45 Nepal Time, the three climbers radioed to their expedition leader that they had arrived at the top. They left an offering of prayer flags, khatas, and pitons. Here, the leader, Smanla, decided to spend extra time on religious ceremonies and instructed the other two to move down.

There was no radio contact after that. Back at the camps below, team members saw two headlamps moving slightly above the Second Step, at 8,570 metres (28,117 ft). None of the three returned to high camp at 8,300 metres (27,231 ft).

Controversy later arose over whether a team of Japanese climbers from Fukuoka had seen and potentially failed to assist the missing Indian climbers. The group had left their camp at 8,300 metres (27,231 ft) at 06:15 Beijing time on 11 May, reaching the summit at 15:07. Along the way, they encountered others on the trail. Unaware of the missing Indians, they believed these others, all wearing goggles and oxygen masks under their hoods, were members of a climbing party from Taiwan. During their descent, which began at 15:30, they reported seeing an unidentifiable object above the Second Step. Below the First Step, they radioed in to report seeing one person on a fixed rope. Thereafter, one of the climbers, Shigekawa, exchanged greetings with an unidentifiable man standing nearby. At that time, they had only enough oxygen to return to C6.

At 16:00, the Fukuoka party discovered from an Indian in their group that three men were missing. They offered to join the rescue but were declined. Forced to wait a day due to bad weather, they sent a second party to the summit on 13 May. They saw several bodies around the First Step but continued to the summit.

Initially, there were some misunderstandings and harsh words regarding the actions of the Fukuoka team, which were later clarified. According to Reuters, the Indian expedition had claimed that the Japanese had pledged to help with the search but had pressed forward with their summit attempt. The Japanese team denied that they had abandoned or refused to help the dying climbers on the way up, a claim that the Indian-Tibetan Border Police accepted. Captain Kohli, an official of the Indian Mountaineering Federation, who earlier had denounced the Japanese, later retracted his claim that the Japanese had reported meeting the Indians on 10 May.

=== 2026 identification and recovery effort ===
In 2026, Indian authorities identified Green Boots as Dorje Morup, a member of the Indo-Tibetan Border Police (ITBP) expedition that attempted Mount Everest from the north in 1996. Morup had previously been proposed as a possible identity of Green Boots, although the body had more commonly been attributed to his teammate Tsewang Paljor. The identification was reported in connection with an Indian government recovery plan for Morup's remains.

The Morup identification had historical support predating the 2026 announcement. In a 1997 account published in the Himalayan Journal, P. M. Das, deputy leader of the 1996 ITBP expedition, described encountering Morup during the descent from the summit area. Das reported that Morup was moving slowly and having difficulty handling his climbing equipment because of frostbite. A subsequent party encountered Morup's body under the shelter of a boulder near the expedition's descent route, close to Camp 6. The account provided an alternative to the longstanding attribution of Green Boots to Paljor.

The body became known as Green Boots because of the distinctive green mountaineering boots associated with it. For many years, it was regarded as a landmark on the northeastern approach to the summit, at an elevation of approximately 8,500 metres. The identity was widely attributed to Paljor, who was also reported to have been wearing green Koflach mountaineering boots when he disappeared during the 1996 expedition.

The 2026 identification was accompanied by plans to recover Morup's remains from the northern side of Everest. The ITBP sought specialist high-altitude climbers for the operation, which presents significant logistical difficulties because the body is located in the so-called death zone, where low atmospheric pressure, extreme cold, steep terrain and limited rescue options make work particularly hazardous. The recovery plan was reported as part of a wider effort to bring the remains of Indian climbers home after decades on the mountain.

The proposed recovery has renewed attention to the difficulties of removing bodies from the upper slopes of Everest. At extreme altitude, transporting a body can require a large team of experienced climbers and exposes rescuers to many of the same environmental hazards that caused deaths on the mountain. The Guardian reported that the recovery operation would require a highly skilled team and was subject to logistical and ethical considerations concerning the treatment of human remains on the mountain.

Reporting on the planned recovery has also drawn attention to Morup's family and the prospect of returning his remains after approximately three decades. The recovery effort therefore has significance beyond resolving the identity of Green Boots, as it could provide the family with the opportunity to conduct funeral rites with his remains.

== Green Boots in perspective ==
Green Boots is among the roughly 200 corpses remaining on Everest by the early 21st century. It is unknown when the term "Green Boots" entered Everest parlance. Over the years, it became a common term, as all the expeditions from the north side encountered the climber's body curled up in the limestone alcove cave. The cave is at 27,890 ft (8,500 m) and is littered with oxygen bottles. It is below the first step on the path.

Another fallen climber who earned a nickname, "Sleeping Beauty", is Francys Arsentiev, who died in 1998 during an unsuccessful descent from Everest after summiting. Her body remained where she fell and was visible until 2007 when it was ceremonially hidden from view.

Another named corpse is that of Hannelore Schmatz, who, with a prominent position on the south route, earned the moniker "the German woman"; she summited in 1979 but died at 8,200 metres (26,900 ft) altitude during her descent. She remained there for many years but was eventually blown further down the mountain.

== See also ==
- 1996 Indo-Tibetan Border Police expedition to Mount Everest
- Death zone
- List of people who died climbing Mount Everest
