= 1996 South African Everest expedition =

1996 mountain climbing expedition

The 1996 South African Everest expedition was a heavily publicised expedition by a UK-South African climbing team to summit Mount Everest.

The expedition was led by Ian Woodall, intended to be a celebration of post-apartheid South Africa. While the expedition team was positioned on the South Col waiting for a weather window for their summit bid, eight climbers were killed during the 1996 Mount Everest disaster. Despite this, two weeks later, Woodall and O'Dowd made their summit bid. Bruce Herrod followed later, aiming to catch up with them.

Woodall and Cathy O'Dowd summited together. Bruce Herrod continued solo to the summit after Woodall and O'Dowd. He called base camp to announce he had reached the summit alone at 5:15pm on May 25. He was later found dead the same day, entangled in ropes on the Hillary Step.

After the summit, there were speculations that Woodall and O'Dowd did not successfully reach the summit. Ian Woods wrote to Elizabeth Hawley, of the Himalayan Database to interview the summiting Sherpas to confirm their summit. After interviewing with Lama Jangbu Sherpa, Hawley confirmed the summit of O'Dowd and Woodall, but could not independently verify Herrod's summit.

A year later, American climber Peter Athans found Herrod's body on Everest, retrieved his camera and cut the ropes tying him to the mountain. After developing the film, his partner found two pictures of Herrod at the summit of Everest.

== Controversy ==
The expedition was initially sponsored by the Sunday Times. After a falling out with the paper, other outlets covered the expedition including 702 Talk Radio. Both before and afterwards, the expedition was surrounded by controversy around Woodall's leadership style, and a number of senior team members left the expedition. There were also accusations that Deshun Deysel, an inexperienced Coloured woman was included in the expedition because of her race.

== Team ==
The team consisted of the following members:

- Ian Woodall (39), expedition leader
- Cathy O’Dowd (27), Journalism lecturer
- Bruce Herrod (37), UK citizen, scientist
- Deshun Deysel (25), Not officially on climbing permit, reached 6,500m high point
- Andy Hackland, Dismissed from team by Ian Woodall
- Andy de Klerk, Dismissed from team by Ian Woodall
- Ed February, Dismissed from team by Ian Woodall
- Charlotte Noble, team doctor, Dismissed from team by Ian Woodall
- Brian Pottinger, Sunday Times correspondent
- Richard Shorey, Sunday Times photographer
- Ken Vernon, Sunday Times correspondent
- Ken Woodall, father of Ian Woodall
- Philip Woodall, Base Camp manager
- Three Sherpa guides: Lama Jangbu Sherpa, Ang Dorje, Pemba Tenji // Pekka Tenja
