= Shailendra Kumar Upadhyay =

Nepali politician

Shailendra Upadhyay Dahal
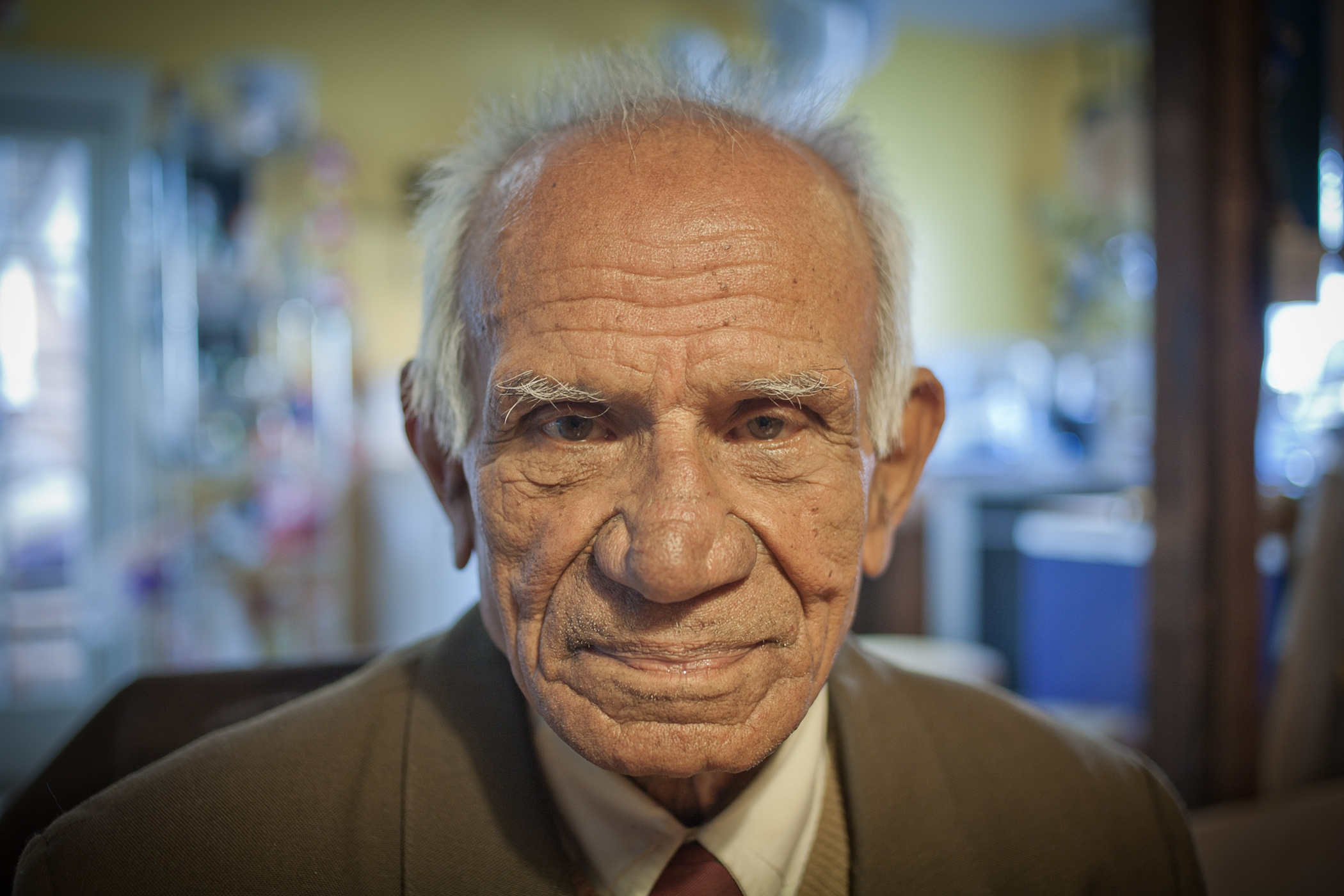
- Shailendra Kumar Upadhyay
- Born: 17 April 1929; Karnol, Sahebganj, India
- Died: 9 May 2011 (aged 82); Khumbu, Khumjung, Nepal
- Occupations: Mountaineer, politician
- Organization: United Nations

Shailendra Kumar Upadhyay Dahal (Nepali: शैलेन्द्र कुमार उपाध्याय; 17 April 1929 – 9 May 2011) was a Nepalese politician. He was Minister of Foreign Affairs for Nepal from 1986 to 1990. He was Nepal's Ambassador and Permanent Representative to the United Nations from 1972 to 1978. He also held positions such as Defense Minister, Interior Minister, and the King's Royal Adviser.

Upadhyay was born in exile in Karnol, Saheb Ganj, India, due to the Kshatriya seizure of the Nepalese government in 1846. He died on 9 May 2011 in an attempt to become the oldest person to climb Mount Everest.

== See also ==
- List of people who died climbing Mount Everest
