= Hannelore Schmatz =

German mountaineer (1940–1979)

- Born: Hannelore Ledermann; 16 February 1940; Regensburg, Bavaria, Germany
- Died: 3 October 1979 (aged 39); Mount Everest
- Spouse: Gerhard Schmatz

Hannelore Schmatz (née Ledermann; 14 February 1940 – 3 October 1979) was a German mountaineer and the fourth woman to summit Mount Everest. She collapsed and died as she was returning from summiting Everest via the southern route; Schmatz was the first woman and first German citizen to die on the upper slopes of Everest.

== Biography ==
In 1962, Schmatz married her husband, Gerhard Schmatz, who was the first European to climb all Seven Summits. The pair lived in Neu-Ulm, where Gerhard ran a notary office. Her husband introduced Schmatz to mountaineering and together, they climbed Manaslu in May 1973, Tirich Mir in July 1975, and Lhotse in June 1977. Between 1973 and 1976, the couple made it an annual tradition to scale one of the highest mountains. With the ascent of Tirich Mir, Schmatz was the first German woman to climb a seventhousander mountain.

=== Death ===
Schmatz was on an expedition via the South East Ridge route with her husband Gerhard Schmatz, who was the expedition leader and the oldest man to summit Everest at the time at age 50 on October 1. Hannelore Schmatz initially didn't plan to go to the summit, but decided to do so shortly after her husband began making his way down the day before. She arrived the summit on October 2. On the same expedition was the American Ray Genet, who died while descending from the summit. Exhausted from the climb, they had stopped to bivouac at 28,000 feet (8,500 m) as the night approached, despite their Sherpa guides urging them not to stop. Ray Genet died later that night and both the Sherpa and Schmatz were distressed, but decided to continue their descent. The next morning at 27,200 feet (8,300 m) Schmatz sat down, said "Water, Water" to her Sherpa and died. Sungdare Sherpa, one of the Sherpa guides, remained with her body, and as a result, lost most of his fingers and toes.

Genet's body ultimately disappeared under the snow, but Schmatz's body remained where she died on the mountain.

It was in 1999, 20 years later, that Helga Hengge was the first German woman to survive reaching the summit of Mount Everest. She made the ascent from Tibet via the North Side route. In 2009, Billi Bierling followed Hannelore Schmatz's route from the south to the summit and back.

== Body ==
For years, Schmatz's remains could be seen by anyone attempting to summit Everest by the southern route. Her body was frozen in a sitting position, leaning against her backpack with eyes open and hair blowing in the wind, about 100 metres (330 ft) above Camp IV.

In 1980, while travelling through Kathmandu, her husband unexpectedly found the Leica camera Schmatz was carrying at the time of her death in a local shop, and bought it for $200. Schmatz's husband assumes that someone stole the camera from her body while on the mountain.

During a 1981 expedition Sungdare Sherpa was the guide again for a new group of climbers. He had refused at first due to losing his fingers and toes during the 1979 expedition, but was paid extra by climber Chris Kopcjynski. During this climb down as they passed Schmatz's body, Kopcjynski was shocked, thinking it was a tent and stated "We did not touch it. I could see she had on her watch still."

Her body was held in place by her climbing rope during gale gusts until 1982, when an unidentified climber is presumed to have cut the cord.

In October 1984, police inspector Yogendra Bahadur Thapa, 36, and his guide, Ang Dorjee, 35, fell to their deaths while trying to recover Schmatz's body on a Nepalese police expedition.

British mountaineer Chris Bonington spotted Schmatz from a distance in April 1985, and initially mistook her body for a tent until he got a closer look.

Lene Gammelgaard, the first Scandinavian woman to reach the summit of Everest, quotes the Norwegian mountaineer and expedition leader Arne Næss Jr. describing his encounter with Schmatz's remains, in her book Climbing High: A Woman's Account of Surviving the Everest Tragedy (1999), which recounts her own 1996 expedition. Næss' description is as follows:

"It's not far now. I can't escape the sinister guard. Approximately 100 meters (300') above Camp IV she sits leaning against her pack, as if taking a short break. A woman with her eyes wide open and her hair waving in each gust of wind. It's the corpse of Hannelore Schmatz, the wife of the leader of a 1979 German expedition. She summited, but died descending. Yet it feels as if she follows me with her eyes as I pass by. Her presence reminds me that we are here on the conditions of the mountain."

The wind eventually blew Schmatz's remains over the edge and down the Kangshung Face.

== See also ==
- List of people who died climbing Mount Everest
