= Ray Genet =

American mountaineer (1931–1979)

- Born: July 27, 1931; Romandy, Switzerland
- Died: October 3, 1979 (aged 48); Mount Everest, Nepal
- Cause of death: Cold, exhaustion
- Occupations: Mountaineer, guide

Ray Genet (July 27, 1931 – October 3, 1979) was a Swiss-born American mountaineer. He was the first guide on North America's highest mountain, Alaska's Denali (Mount McKinley). Genet is the grandfather of actress Q'Orianka Kilcher.

== Career ==
Genet's association with Denali began in 1967, when, although he had no previous mountaineering experience, he participated in the first successful winter expedition to Denali's summit, led by Gregg Blomberg. The expedition is described in Minus 148 Degrees: The First Winter Ascent of Mount McKinley (1970) by Art Davidson.

== Death ==
Genet reached the summit of Mount Everest on October 2, 1979. He died the following morning while descending, succumbing to hypothermia in the night. Exhausted from the climb, they had stopped to bivouac at 28,000 feet (8,500 m) as the night approached, despite their Sherpa Sundare urging them not to stop.

The two Sherpa guides, Sungdare Sherpa and Ang Jangbo, stayed with them in their bivouac but Genet did not survive until morning. The group was running low on bottled oxygen, and Schmatz died trying to get down to South Col.

== See also ==
- List of people who died climbing Mount Everest
