= Hristo Prodanov =

Bulgarian mountaineer

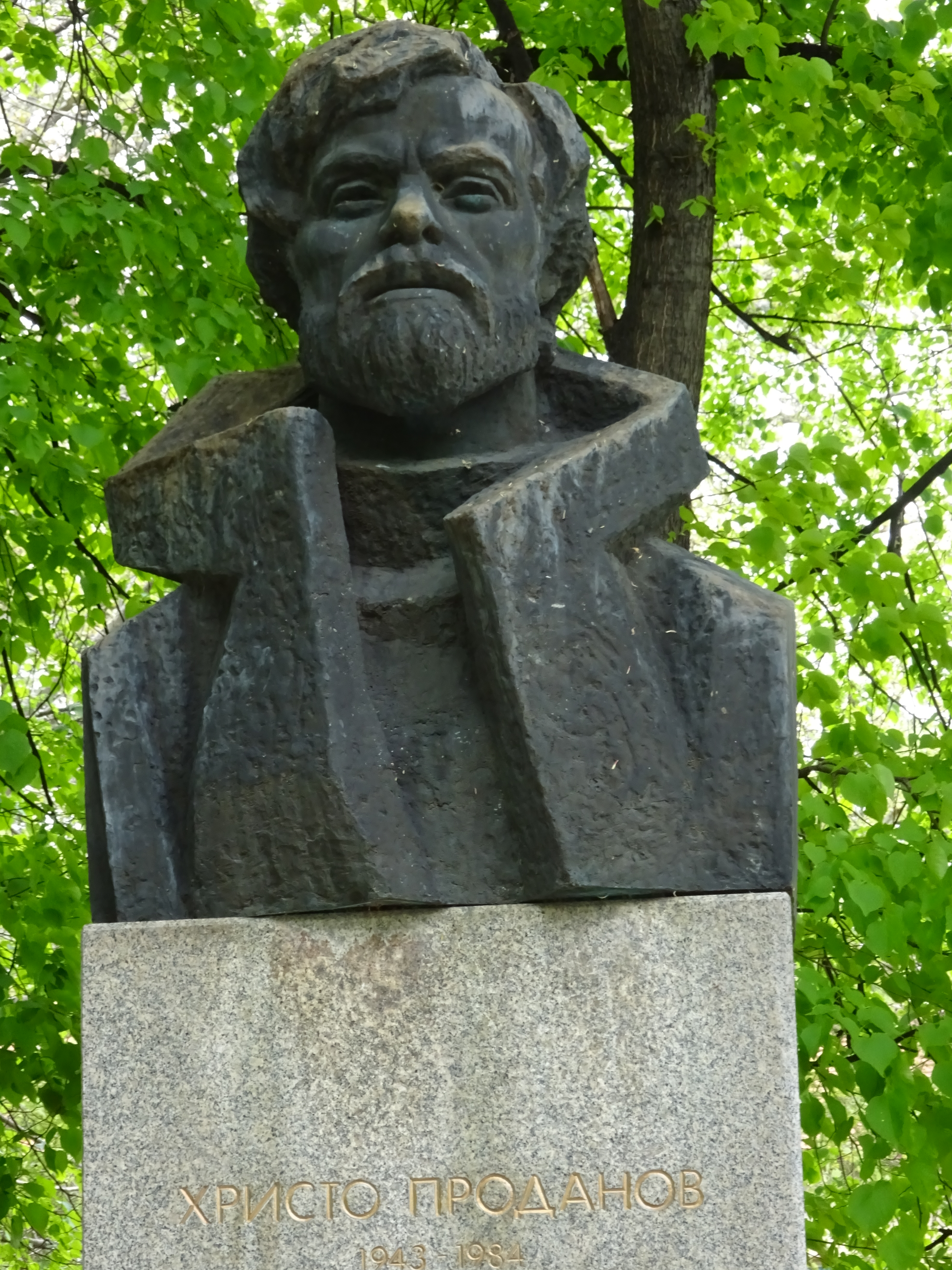
- Bust of Prodanov in Karlovo
- Born: 24 February 1943; Kingdom of Bulgaria
- Disappeared: 21 April 1984 (aged 41); Mount Everest
- Status: Missing for 42 years and 26 days
- Occupation: mountaineer
- Known for: Being the first Bulgarian to climb Mount Everest

Hristo Ivanov Prodanov, also known as Christo Prodanov (Bulgarian: Христо Иванов Проданов; 24 February 1943 – disappeared 21 April 1984) was a Bulgarian mountaineer. Prodanov was the first Bulgarian to climb Mount Everest, doing it via the most difficult way—the West Ridge—as well as alone and without oxygen. Prodanov was the first person to climb Everest in April, when the weather conditions are generally too bad for an expedition, and also the thirteenth person (first person from the West Ridge) to climb Everest without using bottled oxygen. Climbing the summit at 18:15 local time, he had to descend overnight and got lost shortly after that. On the next afternoon, he reported he had lost his gloves and soon would be unable to hold the radio button long enough to talk. His body was never found.

Prodanov was still a student when he became involved in mountaineering. He began work as a metallurgical engineer in Kremikovtzi AD in 1976. He had his first 7000 m ascent on 6 August 1967 when he climbed Lenin Peak. He had previously climbed several peaks in the Alps.

His major successes were related to Hindu Kush (1976) and Lhotse. In 1981, he was the first Bulgarian to climb Lhotse without the use of supplementary oxygen.

== Personal life ==
His niece, Mariana Prodanova Maslarova, attempted to climb Mount Everest (without the use of supplemental oxygen) on the 20th anniversary of her uncle's death. Maslarova died of exposure at 8,700 meters, exactly 20 years and 30 days after her uncle.

== Climbs ==
=== 8000m ascents ===
- Lhotse (8516m) - 30 April 1981, solo, without oxygen
- Everest (8848m) - 20 April 1984, solo, without oxygen

=== 7000m ascents ===
- Lenin Peak (7134m) - 2 August 1975, 28 July 1982, 6 August 1982, 13 July 1983, 2 August 1983
- Communism Peak, today known as Ismail Samani Peak (7495m) - 29 July 1980, 24 July 1983
- Peak Korzhenevskaya (7105m) - 28 July 1979, 31 July 1979, 8 August 1982, 29 July 1983
- Noshaq (7492m) - 30 July 1976

=== Alps ===
- North face of Matterhorn (4471m) - 21–26 September 1974, together with Trifon Djambazov
- North face of Grand Jorasses on the Walker Spur (4208m) - 30 July - 1 August 1967, together with Atanas Kovandzhiev
- Petit Dru (3733m), Bonatti route - 16–18 July 1967; "Route of Guides" - 3–8 September 1977
- Mont Blanc (4807m), Freney Pillar - 15–16 July 1969

=== Caucasus ===
- Pillar of Ushba - 25–28 July 1970
- Traverse in Shkhelda (4320m) – 24 July – 1 August 1973

== Awards ==
Prodanov received several awards, including:

- No. 1 Bulgarian Mountaineer for the 20th century.
- "Hero of People's Republic of Bulgaria" (1984 – posthumously)
- "Georgi Dimitrov" order (1981; 1984 – posthumously)
- "People's Republic of Bulgaria", second class (1977)

== See also ==
- List of 20th-century summiters of Mount Everest
- List of people who disappeared mysteriously: post-1970
