= Jozef Psotka =

Czechoslovak mountain climber

Jozef Psotka

Jozef Psotka (12 February 1934, Košice, Czechoslovakia – October 16, 1984 (aged 50), Mount Everest, Himalayas, Nepal) was a Slovak mountaineer, at that time the oldest person in the world to reach the summit of Mount Everest without oxygen.

== Biography ==
He attended a high school in Košice, Czechoslovakia, and graduated in 1953. He had a lifetime passion for mountaineering, climbing Matterhorn and Kangchenjunga, among other peaks. On October 15, 1984, he reached the summit of Mount Everest without oxygen with Zoltán Demján and Sherpa Ang Rita. Together with Zoltan Demján, he was the first Slovak climber to reach the summit of Mount Everest. During the return, they separated and Psotka accidentally fell 1,000 meters (3280.84 ft) to his death.

== See also ==
- List of people who died climbing Mount Everest
