= Priscilla Duffield =

American secretary and office manager (1918–2009)

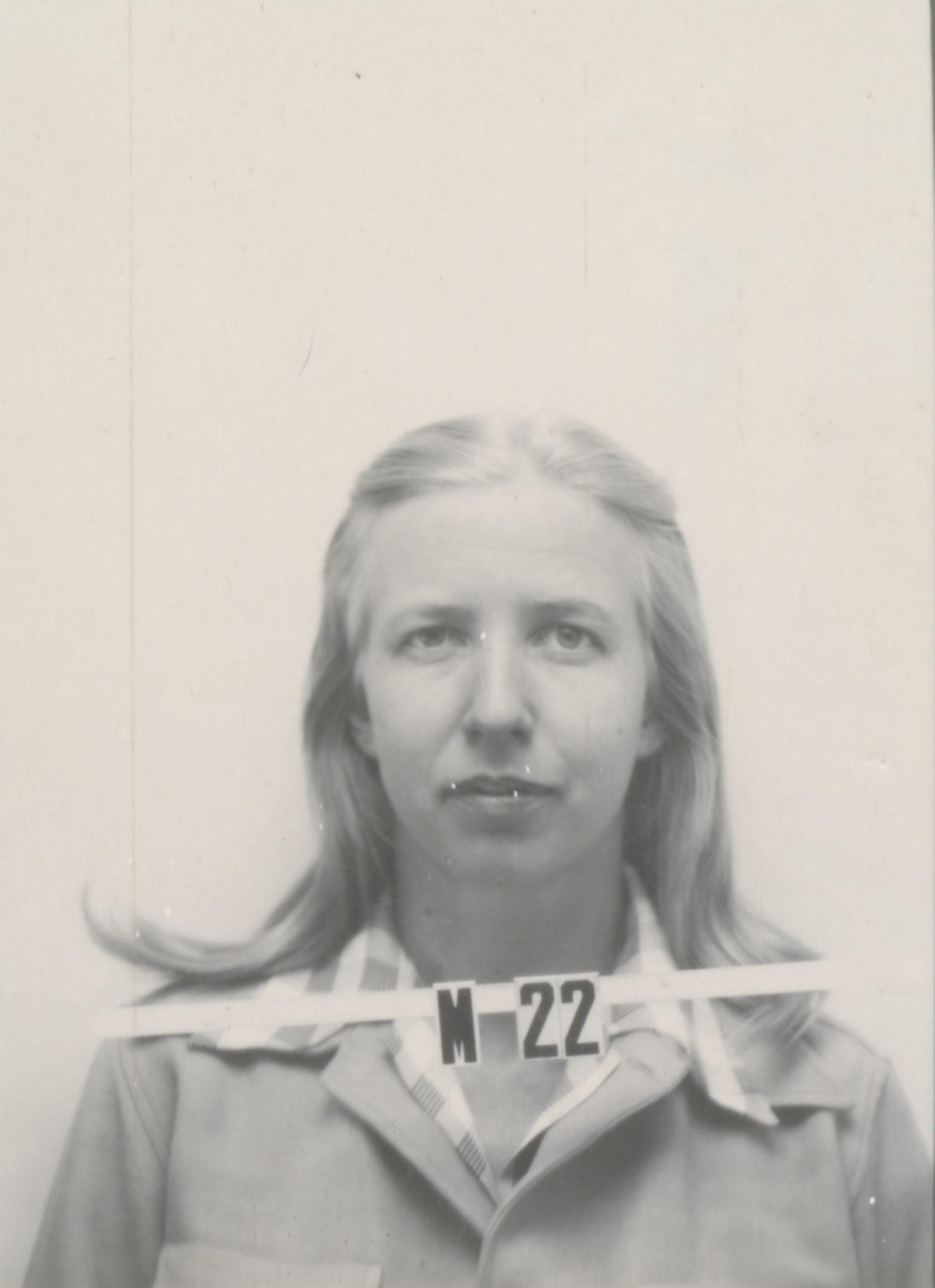
- Los Alamos badge photo
- Born: Priscilla Greene; April 8, 1918; Berkeley, California, U.S.
- Died: July 21, 2009 (aged 91); Norwood, Colorado, U.S.
- Education: University of California, Berkeley (BA)
- Known for: Manhattan Project

Priscilla Duffield (April 8, 1918 – July 21, 2009, née Greene) worked on the Manhattan Project during World War II. She was secretary to Ernest O. Lawrence at the Radiation Laboratory, and to J. Robert Oppenheimer at the Los Alamos Laboratory. After the war she was executive assistant to directors of the Scripps Institute of Oceanography and the National Accelerator Laboratory.

A graduate of the University of California, from which she obtained a degree in political science, Priscilla Greene started working for Lawrence in February 1942, and then for Oppenheimer later that year. She arrived in Santa Fe, New Mexico, in March 1943, and established the Los Alamos Laboratory's office. She became the office manager at Los Alamos, greeting visitors, answering the telephone, making travel arrangements, arranging security passes and accommodation, and taking notes of telephone calls. In September 1943, she married Robert B. Duffield, a chemist working at the Los Alamos laboratory, and changed her surname from Greene to Duffield.

In the post-war years, Duffield was secretary and executive assistant to Roger Revelle, the director of the Scripps Institution of Oceanography. In November 1967, she became secretary and executive assistant to Robert R. Wilson, the founding director of the National Accelerator Laboratory, and once again she helped establish a new scientific laboratory on a new site. In later life she moved to Colorado, where she served on the board of the Uncompahgre Medical Clinic.

== Early life ==
Priscilla Greene was born in Berkeley, California, on April 8, 1918, and grew up in Corning, California. She entered the University of California, from which she obtained a degree in political science. After graduation, she studied and travelled in New York and Europe before returning to Berkeley, where she got a job as secretary to Ernest O. Lawrence, the director of the Radiation Laboratory at the University of California, in February 1942, replacing Helen Griggs, who had left to marry Glenn Seaborg.

== Manhattan Project ==
When J. Robert Oppenheimer began working on the nuclear weapon design for the Manhattan Project during World War II, Lawrence loaned Greene part-time to take dictation and do general secretarial work for Oppenheimer, while still working full-time for himself. "When Robert returned from travel and told me that he had just been to a beautiful place, all I could say is, 'take me too!'" she later recalled. Lawrence reluctantly let her go. She immediately started working for Oppenheimer full-time, taking over the disused office of a physics professor who was absent on leave in November 1942.

Greene arrived in Santa Fe, New Mexico, on March 18, 1943, with Oppenheimer's son Peter and his nurse. She found Los Alamos, New Mexico, "a pretty appalling place. It was windy, dusty, cold, snowy... and nothing was finished." "Everything was put together amazingly fast ... (but) it was nothing spectacular. There were unfinished buildings, mud and trucks everywhere." Since there was no telephone line to Los Alamos, the office was initially established at 109 East Palace in Santa Fe. There was no purchasing system in place either, so she bought a typewriter in Santa Fe with her own money. She would spend the rest of the war trying to get reimbursed for it.

When the office moved to Los Alamos, Greene became the office manager, greeting visitors and answering the telephone. She would listen in on all of Oppenheimer's calls and take notes, except when the director of the Manhattan Project, Brigadier General Leslie R. Groves, Jr., told her to get off the line. She typed Oppenheimer's correspondence. Numerous typed documents would end with "JRO:pg". She handled travel arrangements, security passes and accommodation. Alex Wellersten noted that:

While Oppenheimer gets much credit for keeping the entire bomb project in his head, it was actually Greene who managed the director’s office and kept it organized; it was Greene who took notes on phone conversations and managed the correspondence with far-flung sites; it was Greene who helped Oppenheimer, a man who had never managed anything in his life, stay on top of the innumerable tasks assigned to him.

Greene married Robert B. Duffield, a chemist working on the project, in a ceremony at Dorothy McKibbin's house on September 5, 1943. McKibben had a local judge conduct the ceremony, but due to the project's security, he was not allowed to know the surnames of the couple. Nor was any family allowed to attend, although Greene's brother DeMotte, whom she had recruited to work on the project as a technician, was on hand to give the bride away, and guests included Robert Serber, Robert R. Wilson, Harold Agnew and Katherine Oppenheimer. Three weeks later everyone assembled there again for the wedding of her bridesmaid, Marjorie Hall, to Hugh Bradner.

When Duffield became pregnant, she wanted to quit working, but the demands of the project were so great that Oppenheimer kept refusing her requests. He eventually recruited Anne Wilson from Groves's office as her replacement.

== Later life ==
After the war, Duffield became secretary and executive assistant to Roger Revelle, the director of the Scripps Institution of Oceanography. On November 6, 1967, she became secretary and executive assistant to Robert R. Wilson, the founding director of the National Accelerator Laboratory, and served in that capacity until December 31, 1972. Duffield likened this job to working for Oppenheimer at Los Alamos:

"There was the same close feeling of a group of people in a strange land, ... a group of people who were isolated from the rest of the world and trying to do something special." Duffield said that moving to the Weston site evoked memories of the esprit de corps at Los Alamos, and "that did really make it a frontier." She also recalled The feeling of independence and adventure in those early days on the Weston site. "We had a flagpole and a big fancy colorful tent was put alongside the house" As she explained, "It was a place to sit and have a meeting: but it also "was a symbol." And at both labs, "everyone did sort of everything—there was a crisis every day." Duffield emphasized: "Bob managed to give people the feeling of tremendous urgency, of getting the thing done and getting it done fast and getting it done cheap." Later, secretary Barb (Rozic) Kristen recalled that many new employees considered it hard to know just what to do in those early days, but Duffield, unlike everyone else, knew exactly what was needed and how to get things done.

Duffield moved to Norwood, Colorado, where she served on the board of the Uncompahgre Medical Clinic. She died of natural causes at her home there on July 21, 2009. She was survived by her daughters Deborah and Libby. Her husband Robert died in 2000.
