= Christine Boskoff =

American mountain climber (1967–2006)

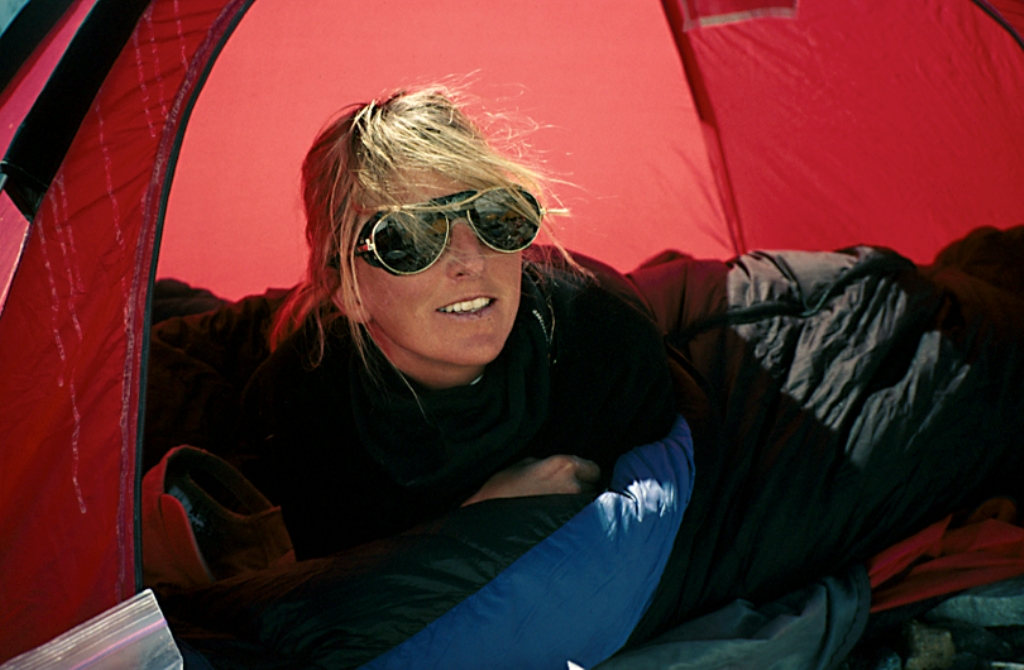
- Chris bundled up on an expedition in the Himalayas

Personal information
- Nationality: American
- Born: Christine Joyce Feld; September 7, 1967 Appleton, Wisconsin, U.S.
- Died: November 14, 2006 (aged 39) (estimated) Genyen Peak, Sichuan Province, China
- Spouse: Keith Boskoff (m. ?–1999; his death)

Christine Boskoff (September 7, 1967 – November 14, 2006 (estimated)) was an American mountaineer.

== Early life ==
Christine Joyce Feld (her maiden name) was the youngest of four children (with three older brothers) of Robin and Joyce Feld. She was born and raised in Appleton, Wisconsin, where she graduated from Appleton East High School. Upon her May 1991 graduation from the University of Wisconsin–Milwaukee, Feld put her bachelor of science in electrical engineering degree to work for Lockheed Aeronautical Systems in Atlanta, Georgia. There she was the team leader for a group that designed software for a lighted control display for the C-130J military cargo plane.

== First experiences in mountaineering ==
Christine Feld Boskoff's first taste of mountaineering was a two-day climbing course in 1993; within a very short time she was climbing technical high-altitude peaks. Her first major summit was Tariji in the Bolivian Andes. Following this climb she began organizing climbing expeditions to Africa, Mexico, Europe, and North America. Climbing with her husband Keith Boskoff, in 1997 Christine Boskoff became the first North American woman to reach the summit of Lhotse. That same year, the Boskoffs purchased the adventure travel firm Mountain Madness from the estate of Scott Fischer, a mountaineer who died climbing Mount Everest in 1996. Christine Boskoff continued to run Mountain Madness, still considered one of leading mountaineering schools and international guide services in America.

Boskoff has verifiable summits of six 8000m peaks (three additional 8000m expeditions were forced to turn back before reaching the summit). She navigated Mount Everest, Shishapangma, Gasherbrum II, Cho Oyu, Lhotse and Broad Peak. She made winter ascents of Mount Angor and Kilimanjaro and climbed Mont Blanc and the Matterhorn. Boskoff mainly eschewed corporate sponsorship for expeditions, choosing to climb without the pressure of media and corporate attention. In her later years, she turned her climbing efforts to first ascents of lower, lesser-known peaks in Asia.

Boskoff lived in Seattle, Washington, and Norwood, Colorado, and served on the Board of Directors for the charity Room to Read.

== Disappearance in China ==
Boskoff and her climbing partner, Charlie Fowler, began a new climb of Genie Mountain (a 20,354-foot (6,204 m) mountain that is also known as Genyen Peak) in Sichuan Province, China, in November 2006. After sending an e-mail on November 8, 2006, the two did not send any further communication and missed a previously arranged meeting with their driver scheduled for November 24. They were last seen on November 12 at a monastery several thousand feet below the summit of Genyen. They were reported missing on December 4, 2006, after they failed to return to the United States as planned.

Their deaths are believed to be the result of an avalanche on the mountain. Chinese and American rescue teams made a search for them, but the two had not left word with anyone which routes they were planning to take.

On December 27, 2006, rescue teams found the body of Charlie Fowler but the search continued for Boskoff's body. On July 9, 2007, Boskoff's company reported her body had been found the previous week, though the danger of falling rocks stopped search crews from retrieving her body. Boskoff's body was not brought down from the 20,000-foot (6,100 m) peak for two months, until 15 rescuers could climb the rocky terrain to bring it down.

A Room to Read memorial fund was set up in Boskoff’s name to benefit school children in Nepal. Boskoff was a former board member of the organization.

== See also ==
- Charlie Fowler (her climbing partner; found dead)
- Mount Genyen (believed to be last known location)
- Mountain Madness – mountaineering company
- Ellen Miller, friend and frequent climbing partner
- List of Mount Everest summiters by number of times to the summit
