= Cerro Catedral (Chile) =

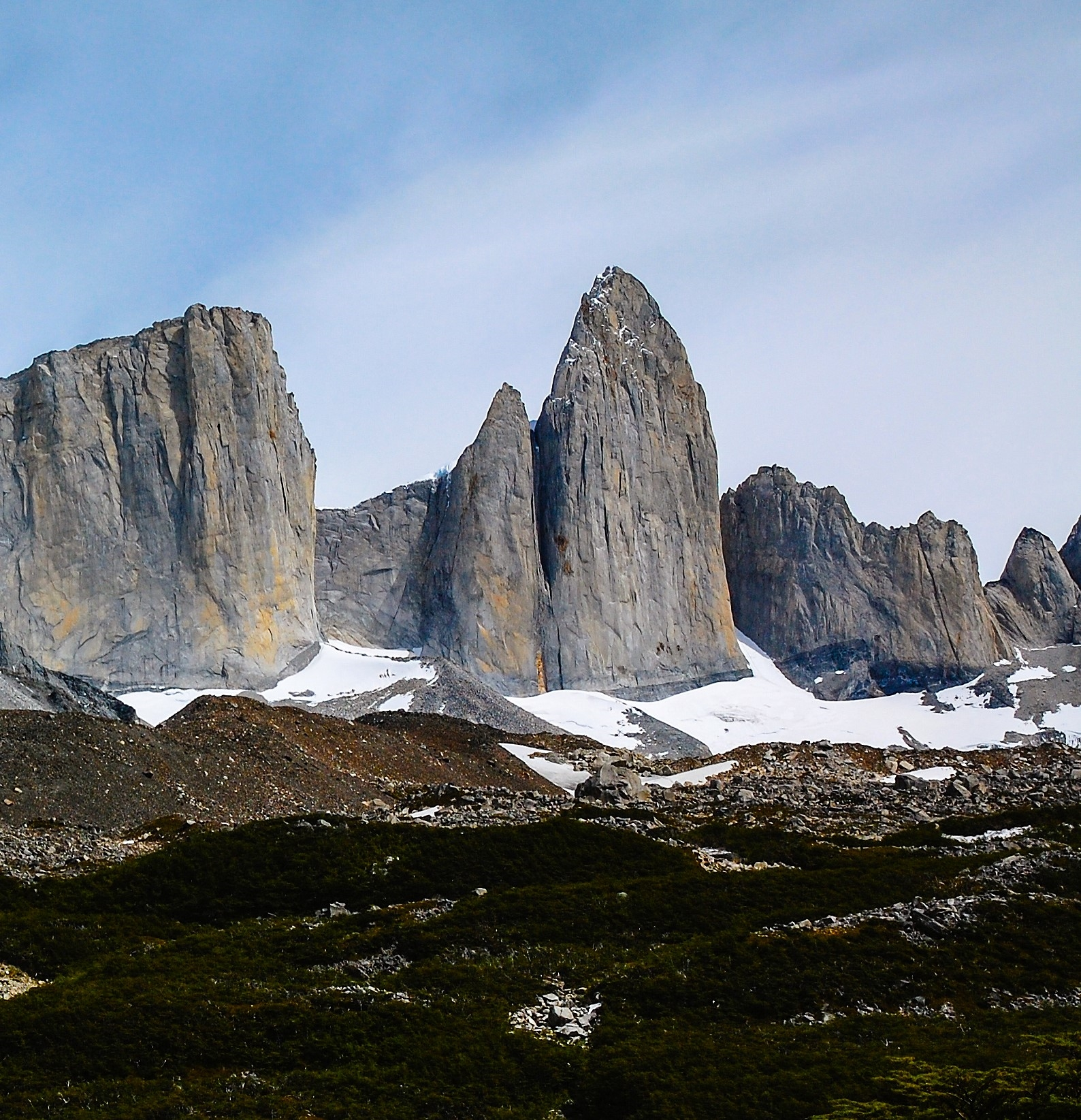
- Southeast aspect

Highest point
- Elevation: 2,167 m (7,110 ft)
- Prominence: 559 m (1,834 ft)
- Parent peak: Cerro Paine Grande
- Isolation: 2.57 km (1.60 mi)
- Coordinates: 50°57′53″S 73°07′15″W

Naming
- Etymology: Cathedral

Geography
- Location within Chile Location within South America Location within Southern Patagonia
- Interactive map of Cerro Catedral
- Country: Chile
- Province: Última Esperanza Province
- Protected area: Torres del Paine National Park
- Parent range: Andes; Cordillera Paine
- Topo map: IGM 1:50,000 Paine (Hoja Paine)

Geology
- Rock age: Miocene
- Rock type: Granite

Climbing
- First ascent: January 9, 1971

Cerro Catedral is a mountain in the Magallanes Region of Chile.

== Description ==
Cerro Catedral, also known as La Catedral, is a 2,167-meter-elevation (7,110-foot) summit in the Cordillera Paine group of the Andes. The peak is located 100 kilometers (62 miles) north-northwest of Puerto Natales, and the peak is within Torres del Paine National Park. Precipitation runoff from the peak's slopes drains primarily to Nordenskjöld Lake which is part of the Paine River watershed, however the southwest slope drains to Grey Lake. Topographic relief is significant as the summit rises 1,470 meters (4,823 feet) above Valle del Francés (French Valley) in 2.5 kilometers (1.55 miles). The peak's descriptive Spanish toponym translates as "Cathedral Mountain" or "The Cathedral." The nearest higher peak is Cerro Trono Blanco, 2.9 kilometers (1.8 miles) to the east-northeast.

== Climbing history ==
The first ascent of the summit was accomplished by a British team on January 9, 1971, via the west ridge. The team members were Chris Jackson, Guy Lee, Dave Nicol, Bob Shaw, Bob Smith, and Roger Whewell.

Climbing routes with first ascents:

- West Ridge – 1971 – British team
- La Escoba de Dios (East face) – January 1992 – Charlie Fowler, John Catto, Peter Gallagher, Max Kendall
- Cristal de Roca (East face) – February 1994 – Javier Ballester, José Chaverri, Santiago Palacios, Lorenzo Ortiz
- Dos Hermanos (NE face) – January 2022 – Juan Señoret, Cristobal Señoret

== Climate ==
Based on the Köppen climate classification, Cerro Catedral is located in a tundra climate zone with long, cold winters, and short, cool summers. Weather systems are forced upward by the mountains (orographic lift), causing moisture to drop in the form of rain and snow. This climate supports the Perros Glacier on the northwest slope of the peak and the Olguín Glacier on the southwest slope. The months of December through February offer the most favorable weather for visiting or climbing in this area, however the region is characterized by low temperatures and strong winds throughout the year.

== Geology ==
The peak is composed of granite underlain by gray gabbro-diorite laccolith and the sedimentary rocks it intrudes, deeply eroded by glaciers. The hot granite that intruded parallel to the sedimentary rock converted the mudstone and sandstone into a dark metamorphic rock. The steep, light colored faces are eroded from the tougher, vertically jointed granitic rocks, while the foothills and dark cap rocks are the sedimentary country rock, in this case flysch deposited in the Cretaceous and later folded.

The radiometric age for the quartz diorite is 12 ± 2 million years by the rubidium-strontium method and 13 ± 1 million years by the potassium-argon method. More precise ages of 12.59 ± 0.02 and 12.50 ± 0.02 million years for the earliest and latest identified phases of the intrusion, respectively, were achieved using Uranium–lead dating methods on single zircon crystals. Basal gabbro and diorite were dated by a similar technique to 12.472 ± 0.009 to 12.431 ± 0.006 million years. Thus, magma was intruded and crystallized over 162 ± 11 thousand years.

== Gallery ==
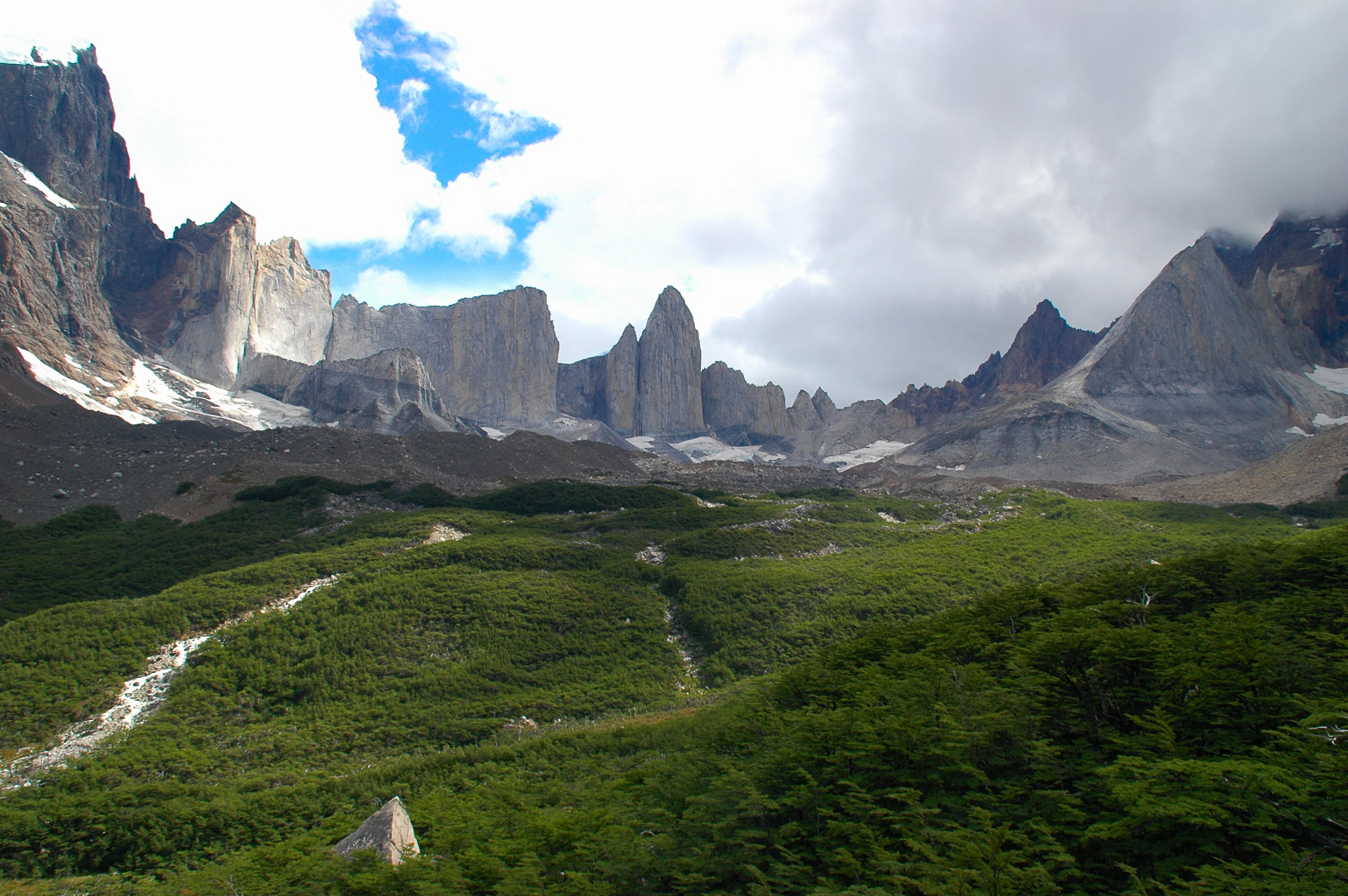
French Valley featuring La Catedral (center)

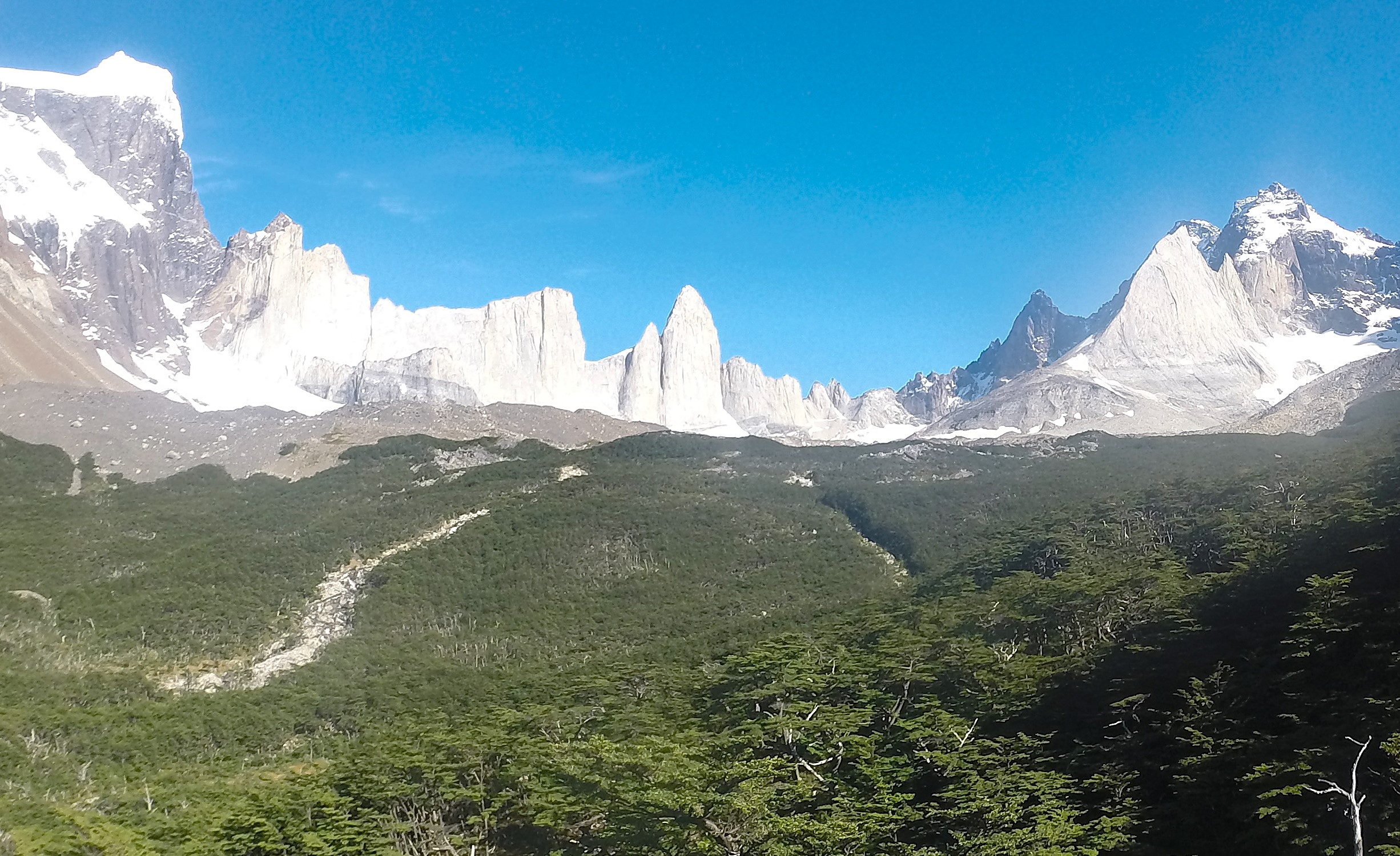
French Valley featuring La Catedral (center) and Cerro Trono Blanco (right).

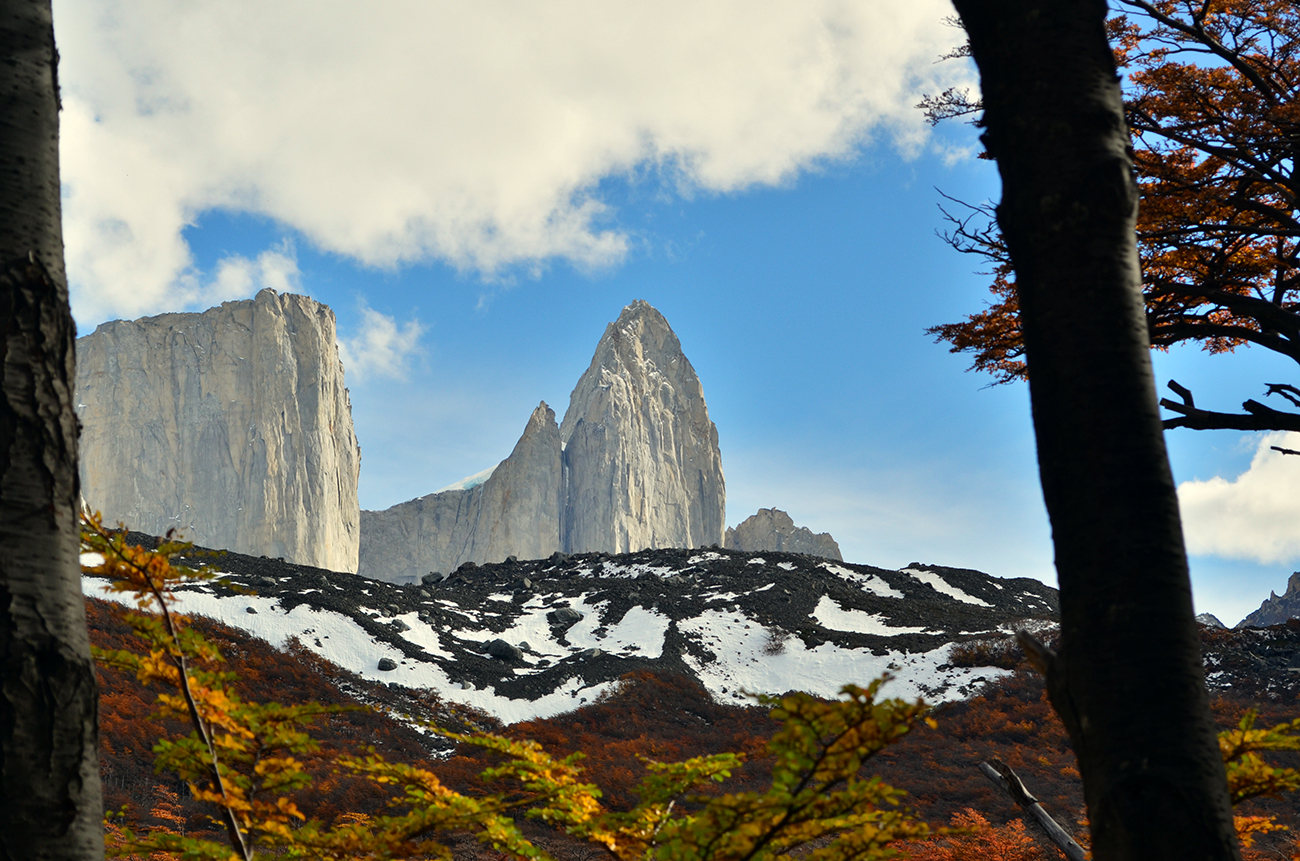
La Catedral centered

== See also ==
- Patagonia
