= Charlie Fowler =

American mountain climber (1954–2006)

Climber Charlie Fowler, on the cover of Climbing Magazine August/September 1993

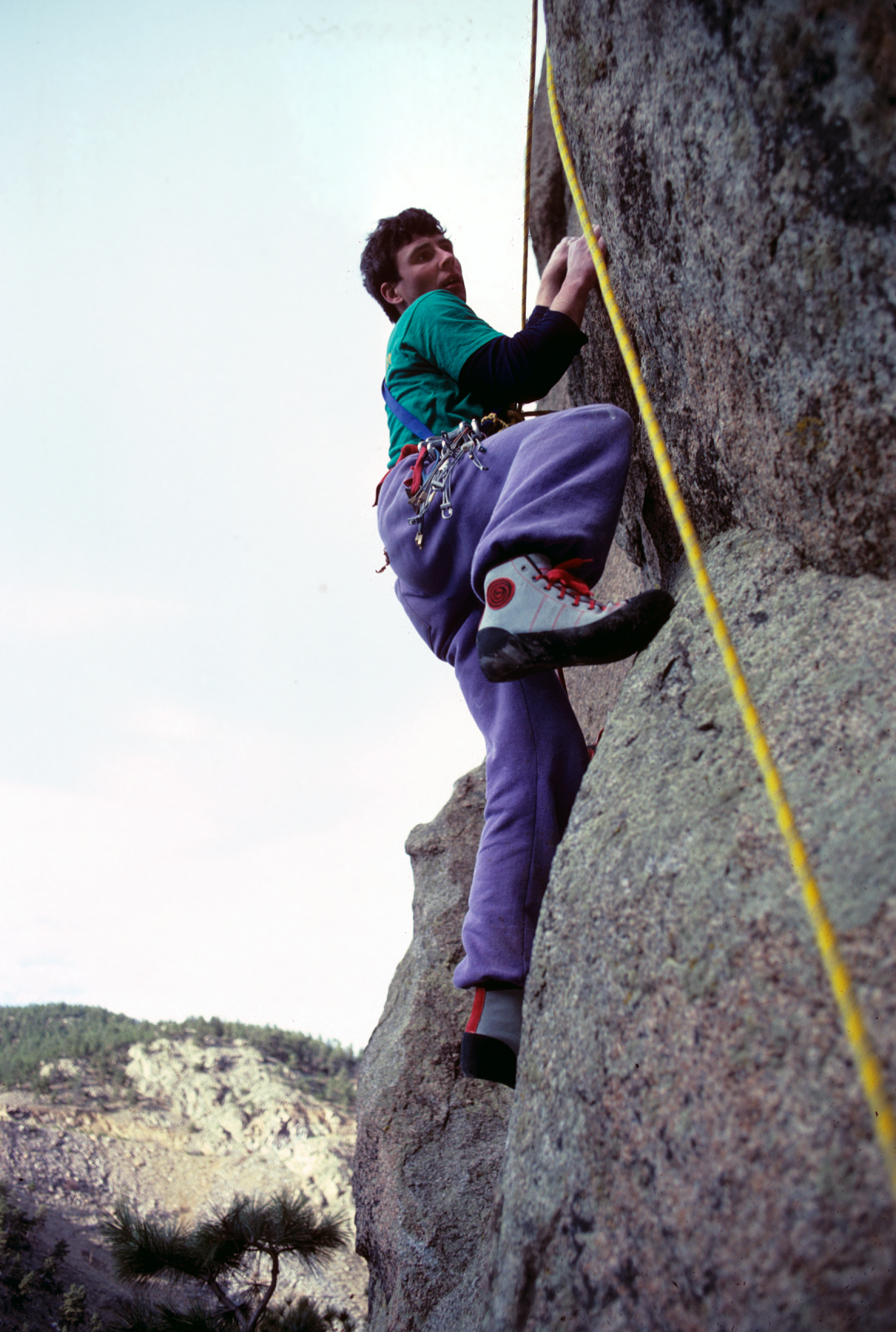
Charlie Fowler climbing in Boulder Canyon, Colorado

Charlie Fowler (February 18, 1954 – November 14, 2006) was an American mountain climber, writer, and photographer. He was one of North America's most experienced mountain climbers, and successfully climbed many of the world's highest peaks. Along with his climbing partner, Christine Boskoff, he went missing in southwestern China sometime between November 11 and November 14, 2006. His body was found on a Ge'nyen Mountain on December 27, 2006, and was officially identified a day later.

== Biography ==
=== Early life and accomplishments ===
Fowler was born in North Carolina and grew up in Virginia, where he graduated from the University of Virginia with a degree in environmental science in 1975. He spent the next 12 years in Boulder, Colorado, before moving to Telluride, Colorado, in 1987 and settling in Norwood, Colorado, in 1992.

In 1977 he gained fame after free soloing the Direct North Buttress route on Middle Cathedral Rock in Yosemite National Park, followed by the first free solo ascent of the Diamond on Colorado's Longs Peak in 1978. The route he chose, initially called the Integral Route, was renamed the Casual Route after Fowler's bold climb.

He became a member of the American Mountain Guides Association in 1986, and was a certified guide who taught courses and evaluated other students who wanted to become certified mountain guides. He often guided expeditions for Mountain Madness, an adventure travel company owned by Christine Boskoff.

Fowler claimed to have been climbing mountains since 1968, having successfully climbed the 8,000 meter peaks of Mount Everest, Cho Oyu, and Shishapangma, as well as Aconcagua, one of the Seven Summits. He attempted to ascend K2, but had to turn back before reaching the summit due to poor conditions. In recent years, he explored unnamed peaks in Tibet and remote areas of China.

In recognition of his climbing accomplishments, he was awarded the Robert and Miriam Underhill Award for outstanding mountaineering achievement by the American Alpine Club in 2004.

=== Other career achievements ===
Fowler's nature photographs and articles have been published in various books, magazines, journals, and catalogs, and he published three local climbing guidebooks. Fowler had the honor of appearing on the cover of Climbing Magazine on different occasions as both cover subject and cover photographer. He also worked as a guide and rigger for Ice Climb, a National Geographic film; participated in two American Adventure Productions films; appeared in several episodes of the Outdoor Life Network's High Country Climber series; and appeared in and helped film the award-winning John Catto documentary La Escoba de Dios.

Along with his friend Damon Johnston, Fowler founded the publishing company Mountain World Media LLC in 2005. Fowler and Johnston also co-authored a guidebook to sandstone climbs in southwest Colorado titled The Wild Wild West. Fowler also started the Telluride Mountain Club and the Horizon Program.

Additionally, he was a board member of Mountainfilm in Telluride for almost 10 years, and served on their Advisory Board.

== Disappearance and death ==
In October 2006, Fowler left the United States for China with his climbing partner, Christine Boskoff, for a two-month-long trip to attempt several peaks that had never been climbed. According to a post on Fowler's website, it was his fifth trip to the region.

=== Last known contacts ===
From the time of their departure until November 8, 2006, Fowler and Boskoff were in frequent contact with friends and other mountain climbers via email. One of Boskoff's final emails said that the pair would be "back in Internet contact in two weeks."

On November 7, Fowler made his last known contact with the outside world in an email sent to Alpinist from Litang, China:

We're in the town of Litang for a few days, getting ready for one more trip into the hills. We just got back from attempting a peak I tried in '96 doing a film. Didn't make it that time due to complications with the film crew. This time the peak was a lot less icy (global warming?). We got near the top but backed off due to scary conditions --- thin snow over rock slabs. Had a blast climbing as far as we did though. Now off to one more different area to try a 6,000-meter peak and a smaller one, then traveling back doing the tourist thing.

=== Search efforts ===
Fowler and Boskoff were officially declared missing when they were not present on a scheduled return flight to the United States booked for December 4. Search efforts by Chinese authorities and an independent search party retained by friends and mountaineers continued through most of December 2006.

The two peaks Fowler referred to in his final email were unnamed, which initially complicated search and rescue efforts launched by local authorities in Litang. Furthermore, locals in Litang and Buddhist monks living at a monastery near the base of Mount Genyen told investigators they had not seen any foreigners in the area for the previous month. The authorities also found no evidence of the pair in the vicinities of other peaks they had talked about climbing in previous e-mails.

But, on December 25 (about three weeks after the pair was declared missing), authorities began to make progress in the search when they discovered a local man who said he had driven Fowler and Boskoff to a remote town not far from the Tibetan border. According to the driver, Fowler and Boskoff said they planned to climb 6,204-meter (20,354-foot) Mount Genyen. They left their luggage with the man when he dropped them off on November 11, and said they would retrieve it when they returned on November 24, which they never did. With this new lead, the authorities began to focus their efforts on the slopes of Mount Genyen.

=== Bodies found ===
On December 27, searchers found a body, mostly buried in snow, at the 5,300-meter level of Mount Genyen, though darkness prevented them from making an immediate identification. They returned on December 28 and confirmed that the body was Fowler's.

The initial investigation revealed that Fowler was likely killed in an avalanche.

The body of Christine Boskoff was found and identified on July 8, 2007. It was to be retrieved from the mountain in August 2007 (when more favorable weather conditions were predicted for the recovery team).

== Notable ascents ==
- 1981 Pale Fire IV 5.12, Moses, Canyonlands National Park, Utah; FFA of North Face Route (Bjornstad, Beckey, Galvin, Nephew, Markov 1972) with Chip Chace, May 1981
- 1982 In Search of Suds III 5.10+, Washer Woman Arch, Canyonlands National Park, Utah; FA with Glenn Randall, November 1982
- 1986 Zenyatta Entrada III 5.4, Tower of Babel, Arches National Park, Utah; FA with Eric Bjornstad, October 1986
- 1986 Soft Parade, Jello Tower, Arches National Park, Utah; FA with Sue Wint, November 1986
- 1986 Cuddlebunny Tower, Marching Men, Arches National Park, Utah; FA with Rob Slater, Geoff Tabin, December 30, 1986
- 1988 The Promised Land (V 5.10+ A3+), Moses, Canyonlands National Park, Utah; FA with Sue Wint
- 1992 East Face, La Catedral, Paine Group, Patagonia (VI 5.10 A4+ 1000m). FA of route (2nd of peak) with John Catto, Peter Gallagher and Max Kendall. Summit reached January 26, 1992.

== See also ==
- Christine Boskoff (climbing partner)
- Mountaineering
- Mount Genyen
- Forensic pathology
- Mountain Madness (Mountaineering company)
