= Marching Men (Utah) =

Rock formation in Utah, United States

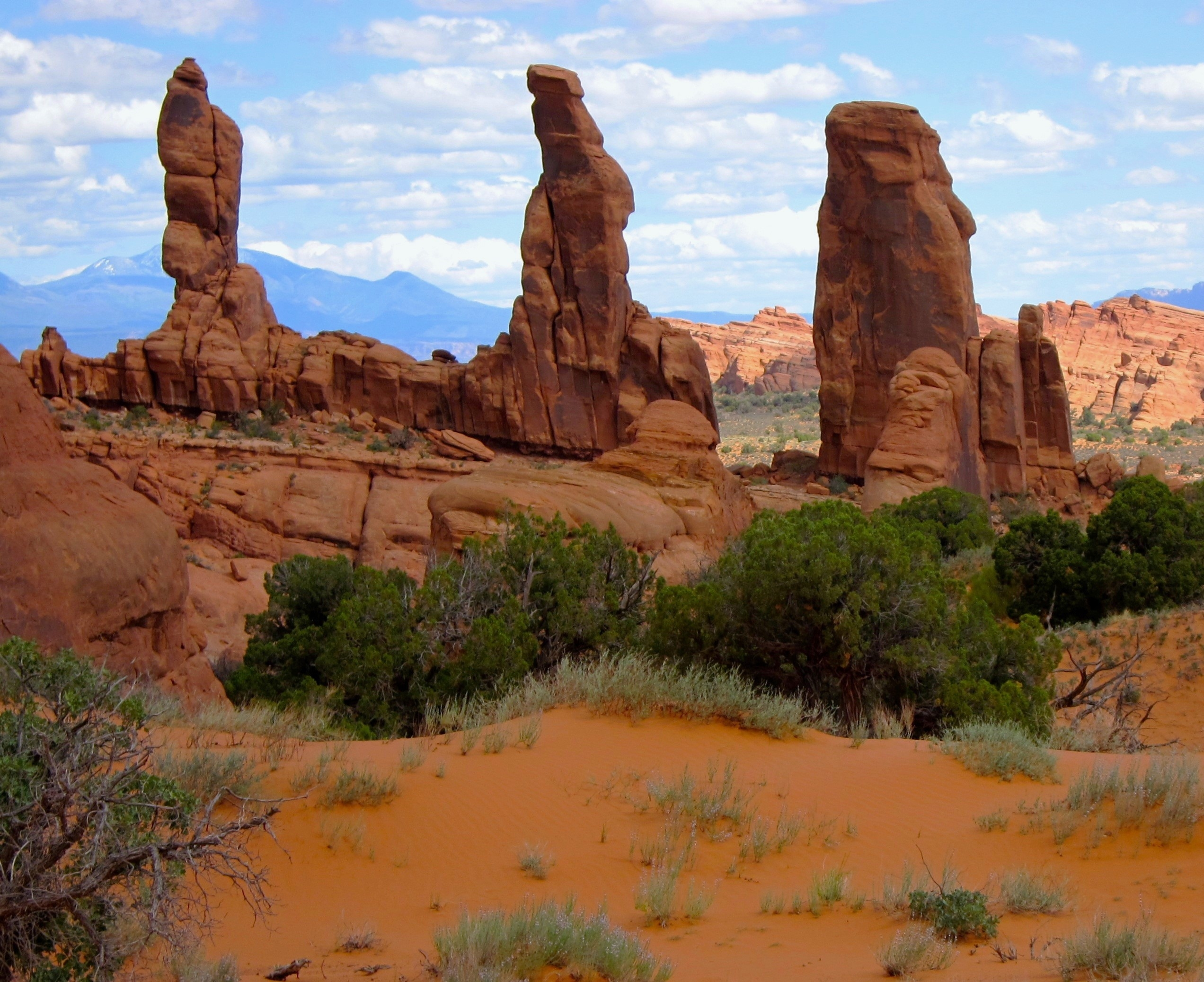
- Northwest aspect North Marcher, Time Tower, Cuddlebunny Tower

Highest point
- Elevation: 5,300 ft (1,615 m)
- Prominence: 120 ft (37 m)
- Parent peak: Klondike Bluffs (5,591 ft)
- Isolation: 0.65 mi (1.05 km)
- Coordinates: 38°47′09″N 109°40′03″W

Geography
- Location within Utah Location within the United States
- Country: United States
- State: Utah
- County: Grand
- Protected area: Arches National Park
- Parent range: Colorado Plateau
- Topo map: USGS Klondike Bluffs

Geology
- Rock age: Jurassic
- Rock type: Entrada Sandstone

Climbing
- First ascent: 1979
- Easiest route: class 5.10+ climbing

Marching Men is an area of pillars in Grand County, Utah, United States.

== Description ==
The Marching Men is located in Arches National Park in the remote northwest section that was added to the park in 1971 when the boundaries of Arches National Monument were expanded and the monument changed to National Park status. Unofficial names for some of the seven towers include Cuddlebunny Tower, Time Tower, and North Marcher, although the National Park Service does acknowledge these names. Topographic relief is modest as the summit of the highest, North Marcher, rises 300 feet (91 meters) above surrounding terrain in 200 feet (61 meters) laterally. Any scant precipitation runoff from Marching Men drains to the nearby Colorado River via Klondike Wash and Salt Valley Wash. The Marching Men area is accessed by a six-mile loop hike that starts at the Klondike Bluffs parking area, and also leads to Tower Arch. This landform's descriptive toponym has been officially adopted by the United States Board on Geographic Names.

== Climbing ==
The first ascent of the highest tower, North Marcher, was made by Leonard Coyne, Dennis Jackson, and Stewart Green in November 1979.

Rock-climbing routes at the Marching Men:

- North Marcher - class 5.10+ - FA Leonard Coyne, Dennis Jackson, Stewart Green - (1979)
- Cuddlebunny Tower - class 5.11d - Charlie Fowler, Rob Slater, Geoff Tabin - (December 30, 1986)
- Time Tower - class 5.10 - Frank Nebbe, Renate Stockburger - (1987)
- Sand Hearse - class 5.11+ - Charlie Fowler, Jack Roberts - (April 23, 1987)
- The Bouquet - class 5.7 - Frank Nebbe, Renate Stockburger - (August 1987)
- Hearse So Good - class 5.9+ - Fred Knapp, Jane Sears - (1991)
- Time Marches On - class 8 - Leslie Henderson, Mike Baker - (1993)

Rock climbing at Marching Men is strictly regulated, including temporary closure from March 1 through August 31 for raptor protection.

== Climate ==
According to the Köppen climate classification system, Marching Men is located in a cold semi-arid climate zone with cold winters and hot summers. Spring and fall are the most favorable seasons to experience Arches National Park, when highs average 60 to 80 °F (15 to 25 °C) and lows average 30 to 50 °F (0 to 10 °C). Summer temperatures often exceed 100 °F (40 °C). Winters are cold, with highs averaging 30 to 50 °F (0 to 10 °C), and lows averaging 0 to 20 °F (−20 to −5 °C). As part of a high desert region, it can experience wide daily temperature fluctuations. The park receives an average of less than 10 inches (25 cm) of rain annually.

== Geology ==
Like most of the arches and rock formations in the park, these spires are composed of Entrada Sandstone, specifically the Slick Rock Member. Because the sandstone is not uniformly cemented with calcium carbonate which is the binding material, chemical weathering and differential erosion has sculpted the iconic landforms of Arches National Park. These towers are the result of erosion and weathering that reduced vertical cross joints of a fin to rock pinnacles. The Marching Men terrain is similar to that of the Devils Garden area to the east, but the two areas are separated by the flat expanse of Salt Valley which was created by a collapsed salt anticline.

== Gallery ==
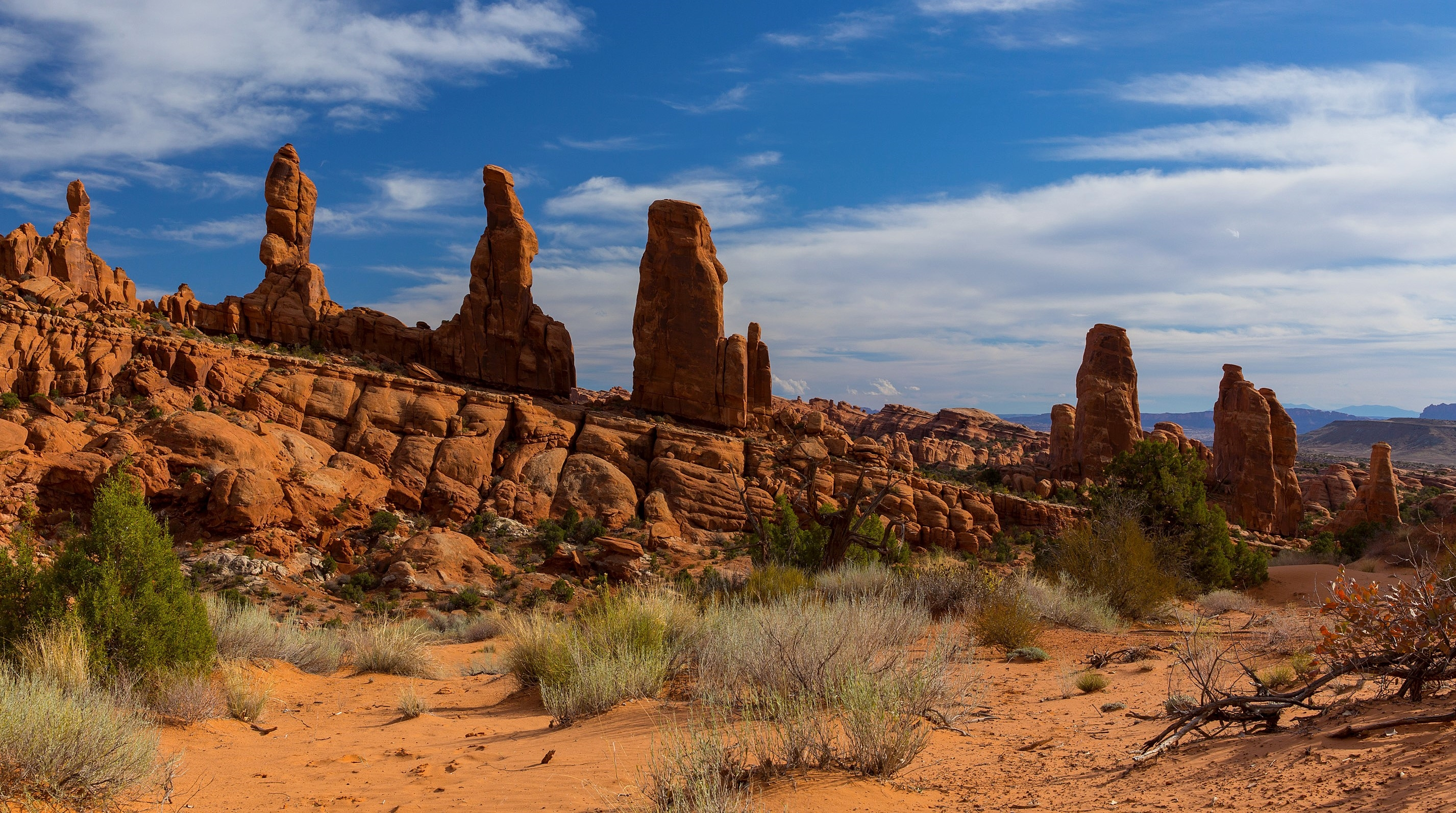
Marching Men

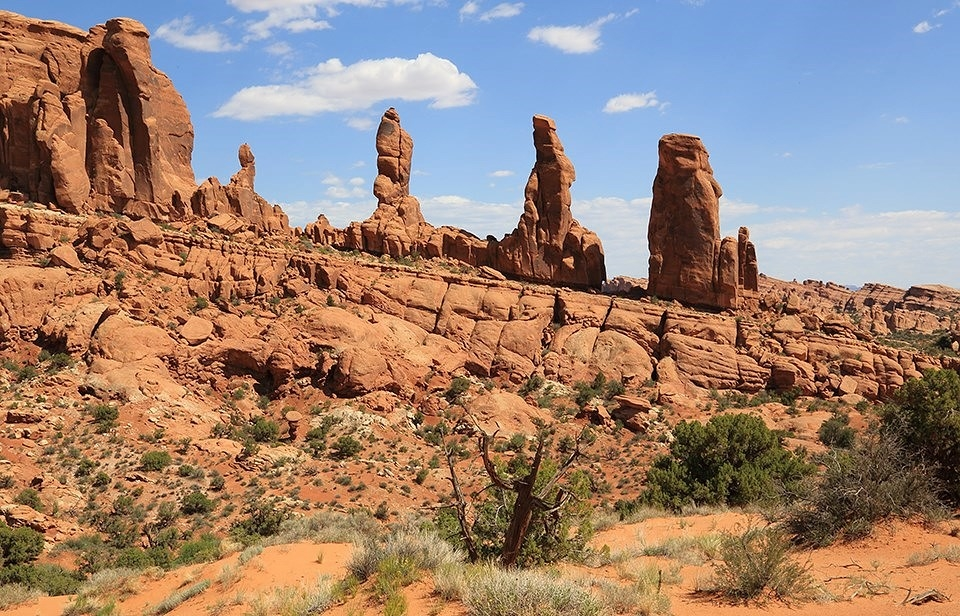
Marching Men

== See also ==
- Geology of Utah
