= Sidney, Iowa =

- City
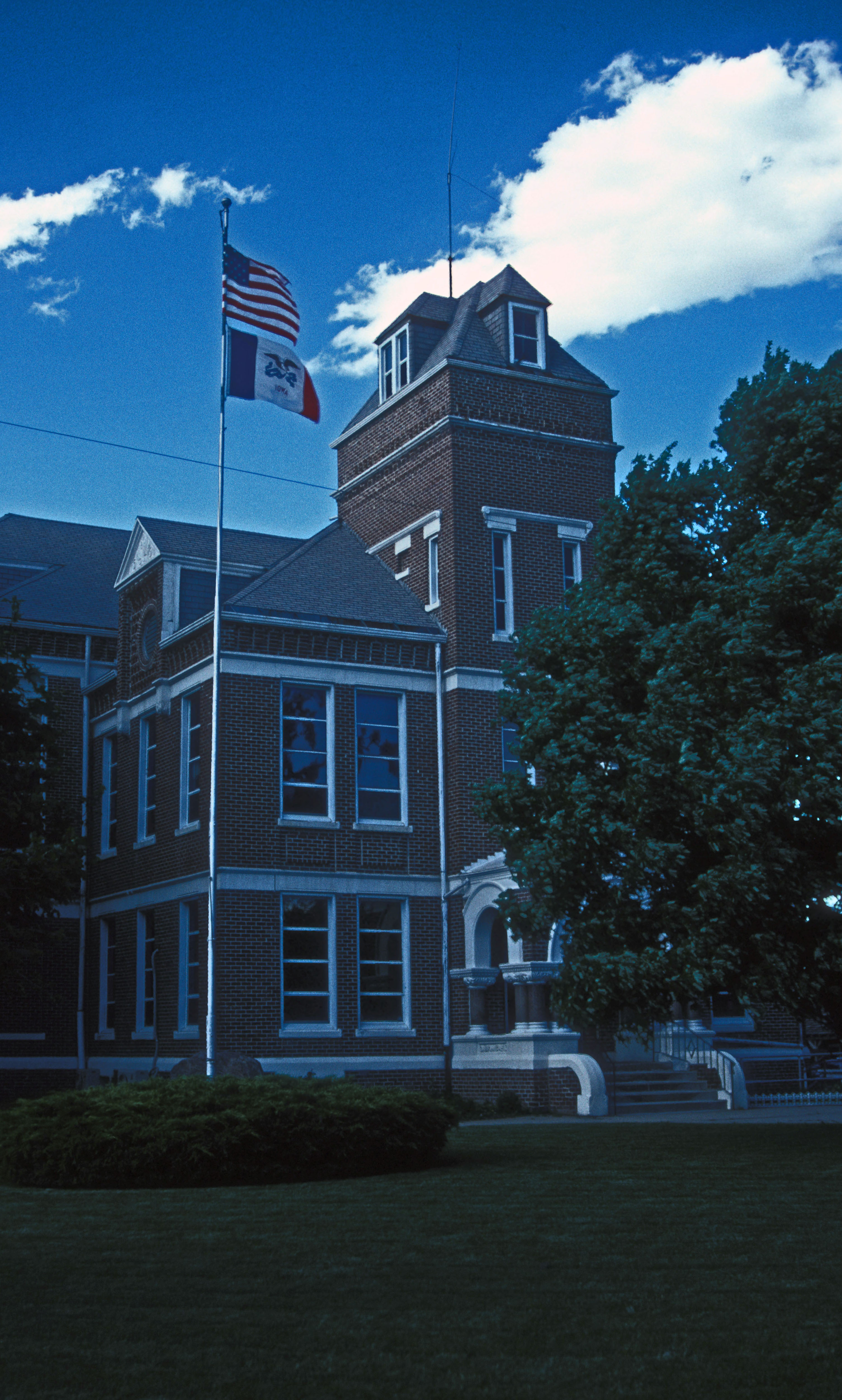
- Fremont County Courthouse in Sidney
- Nickname: Rodeo Town, USA
- Location of Sidney, Iowa
- Coordinates: 40°44′56″N 95°38′43″W
- Country: USA
- State: Iowa
- County: Fremont

Area
  - Total: 1.37 sq mi (3.55 km^{2})
  - Land: 1.37 sq mi (3.55 km^{2})
  - Water: 0 sq mi (0.00 km^{2})
- Elevation: 1,145 ft (349 m)

Population (2020)
  - Total: 1,070
  - Density: 780.5/sq mi (301.34/km^{2})
- Time zone: UTC-6 (Central (CST))
  - Summer (DST): UTC-5 (CDT)
- ZIP code: 51652
- Area code: 712
- FIPS code: 19-73065
- GNIS feature ID: 2395882
- Website: sidneyiowa.org

Sidney is a city in Fremont County, Iowa, United States. The population was 1,070 at the time of the 2020 census. It is the county seat of Fremont County and is one of the smallest county seats in the state.

== History ==
Sidney was laid out in 1851 and was originally to be named Dayton. The surveyors were boarding with the Milton Richards family. Richards' wife suggested they rename the city for her hometown of Sidney, Ohio.

The Sidney Iowa Championship Rodeo, operated by American Legion Post No. 128 since 1924, claims to be the world's largest continuous outdoor rodeo and one of the world's largest rodeos with around 38,000 visitors each year. The event is held in late July/early August.

== Geography ==
According to the United States Census Bureau, the city has a total area of 1.38 square miles (3.57 km^{2}), all land.

== Demographics ==
Sidney historical population
Year	Pop.	±%
1860	423	—
1870	817	+93.1%
1880	855	+4.7%
1890	839	−1.9%
1900	1,143	+36.2%
1910	1,019	−10.8%
1920	1,154	+13.2%
1930	1,074	−6.9%
1940	1,290	+20.1%
1950	1,132	−12.2%
1960	1,057	−6.6%
1970	1,061	+0.4%
1980	1,308	+23.3%
1990	1,253	−4.2%
2000	1,300	+3.8%
2010	1,138	−12.5%
2020	1,070	−6.0%
Source: "U.S. Census website". United States Census Bureau. Source: U.S. Decennial Census

=== 2020 census ===
As of the 2020 census, there were 1,070 people, 440 households, and 261 families residing in the city. The population density was 780.5 inhabitants per square mile (301.3/km^{2}). There were 500 housing units at an average density of 364.7 per square mile (140.8/km^{2}).

The median age in the city was 45.3 years. 22.7% of residents were under the age of 18 and 24.5% were 65 years of age or older. 24.5% of residents were under the age of 20; 4.7% were between the ages of 20 and 24; 20.4% were from 25 to 44; and 26.0% were from 45 to 64. The gender makeup of the city was 49.2% male and 50.8% female. For every 100 females there were 96.7 males, and for every 100 females age 18 and over there were 89.7 males age 18 and over.

Of the 440 households, 27.3% had children under the age of 18 living with them, 41.6% were married-couple households, 8.2% were cohabitating-couple households, 29.8% had a female householder with no spouse or partner present, and 20.5% had a male householder with no spouse or partner present. 40.7% of all households were non-families. 33.6% of all households were made up of individuals, and 16.3% had someone living alone who was 65 years of age or older.

There were 500 housing units, of which 12.0% were vacant. The homeowner vacancy rate was 4.1% and the rental vacancy rate was 9.1%. 0.0% of residents lived in urban areas, while 100.0% lived in rural areas.

Racial composition as of the 2020 census
Race	Number	Percent
White	950	88.8%
Black or African American	0	0.0%
American Indian and Alaska Native	9	0.8%
Asian	2	0.2%
Native Hawaiian and Other Pacific Islander	1	0.1%
Some other race	17	1.6%
Two or more races	91	8.5%
Hispanic or Latino (of any race)	72	6.7%

=== 2010 census ===
As of the census of 2010, there were 1,138 people, 464 households, and 292 families living in the city. The population density was 824.6 inhabitants per square mile (318.4/km^{2}). There were 514 housing units at an average density of 372.5 per square mile (143.8/km^{2}). The racial makeup of the city was 96.8% White, 0.4% African American, 0.5% Native American, 0.2% Asian, 0.6% from other races, and 1.4% from two or more races. Hispanic or Latino of any race were 1.6% of the population.

There were 464 households, of which 32.1% had children under the age of 18 living with them, 44.6% were married couples living together, 13.1% had a female householder with no husband present, 5.2% had a male householder with no wife present, and 37.1% were non-families. 33.2% of all households were made up of individuals, and 16% had someone living alone who was 65 years of age or older. The average household size was 2.33 and the average family size was 2.86.

The median age in the city was 42.8 years. 23.3% of residents were under the age of 18; 6.3% were between the ages of 18 and 24; 22.9% were from 25 to 44; 26.4% were from 45 to 64; and 21.2% were 65 years of age or older. The gender makeup of the city was 48.4% male and 51.6% female.

=== 2000 census ===
As of the census of 2000, there were 1,300 people, 491 households, and 330 families living in the city. The population density was 1,028.6 inhabitants per square mile (397.1/km^{2}). There were 538 housing units at an average density of 425.7 per square mile (164.4/km^{2}). The racial makeup of the city was 98.46% White, 0.08% Native American, 0.08% Asian, 1.15% from other races, and 0.23% from two or more races. Hispanic or Latino of any race were 2.38% of the population.

There were 491 households, out of which 34.4% had children under the age of 18 living with them, 53.6% were married couples living together, 11.2% had a female householder with no husband present, and 32.6% were non-families. 28.9% of all households were made up of individuals, and 18.3% had someone living alone who was 65 years of age or older. The average household size was 2.48 and the average family size was 3.05.

Population spread: 27.1% under the age of 18, 6.1% from 18 to 24, 24.2% from 25 to 44, 21.2% from 45 to 64, and 21.5% who were 65 years of age or older. The median age was 39 years. For every 100 females, there were 87.9 males. For every 100 females age 18 and over, there were 78.9 males.

The median income for a household in the city was $36,375, and the median income for a family was $45,278. Males had a median income of $30,292 versus $24,135 for females. The per capita income for the city was $15,027. About 6.6% of families and 9.7% of the population were below the poverty line, including 12.2% of those under age 18 and 16.3% of those age 65 or over.

== Education ==
Sidney Community School District operates public schools.

== Notable person ==
- Robert Birkby, adventure guide, author, photographer, speaker and trail designer
