= Robert B. Duffield =

US radiochemist

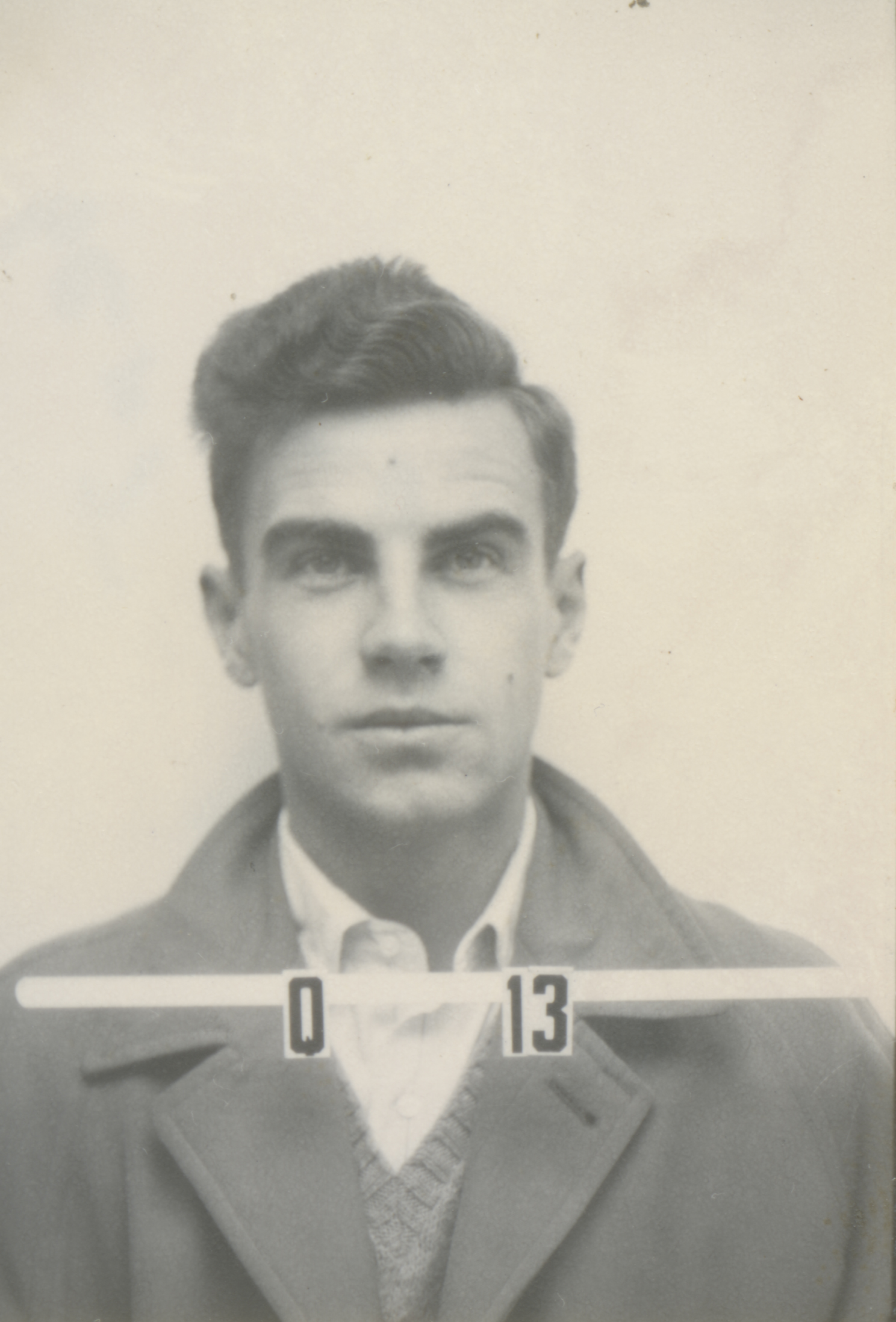
- Los Alamos badge photo
- Born: October 15, 1917; Trenton, New Jersey, US
- Died: December 26, 2000 (aged 83); Norwood, Colorado, US
- Education: Princeton University, University of California, Berkeley
- Occupation: Radiochemist
- Spouse: Priscilla Duffield

Robert B. Duffield (October 15, 1917 – December 26, 2000) was an American radiochemist who worked as part of the Manhattan Project and was director of the Argonne National Laboratory. His main areas of research focused on radioactivity and photonuclear reaction.

Born in Trenton, New Jersey, Duffield graduated from Asbury Park High School. He graduated from Princeton University in 1940 with an undergraduate degree in chemistry and was granted a Ph.D. from the University of California, Berkeley in 1943, the same year that he married Priscilla Duffield.

After working from 1943 to 1946 as part of the Manhattan Project at Los Alamos Laboratory, he was hired as an associate professor at the University of Illinois and was on the school's faculty for the next decade. From 1956 to 1967, Duffield was employed by General Atomics as the Assistant Director of the John Jay Hopkins Laboratory of Pure and Applied Science. In 1967, he was appointed to serve as director of the Argonne National Laboratory, chosen to succeed Albert Crewe. He remained in that position until 1972 when he became a researcher at the Los Alamos National Laboratory, where he focused on potential alternative energy options.

Duffield died of leukemia at his home in Norwood, Colorado, on December 26, 2000.
