= Norwood, Colorado =

Town in San Miguel County, Colorado, United States

- Town
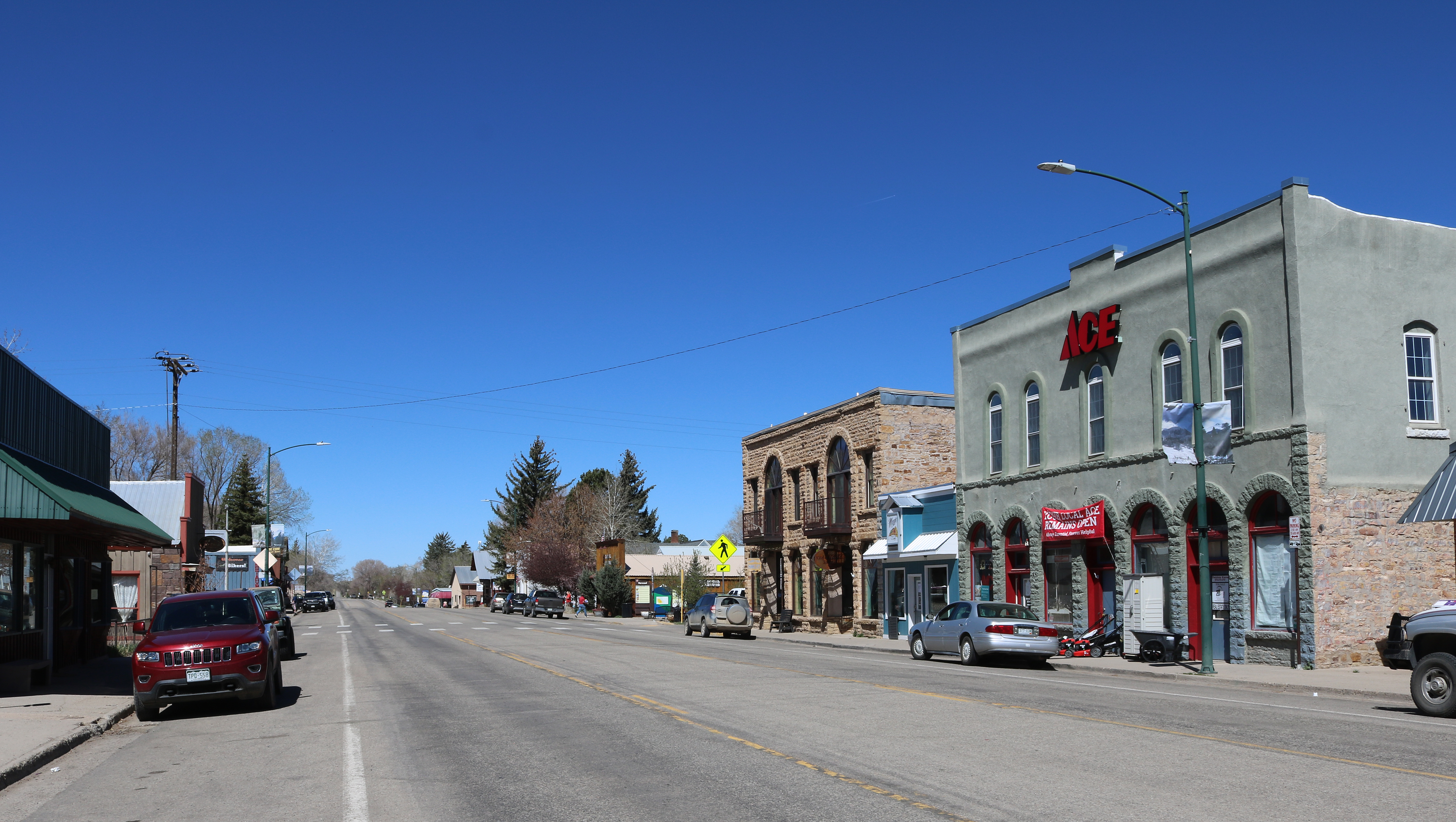
- Grand Avenue, Norwood's main street

- Location of Norwood in San Miguel County, Colorado.
- Coordinates: 38°07′35″N 108°17′28″W
- Country: United States
- State: Colorado
- County: San Miguel
- Incorporated (town): August 20, 1903

Government
  - Type: Statutory town

Area
  - Total: 0.28 sq mi (0.73 km^{2})
  - Land: 0.28 sq mi (0.73 km^{2})
  - Water: 0 sq mi (0.00 km^{2})
- Elevation: 7,018 ft (2,139 m)

Population (2020)
  - Total: 535
  - Density: 1,900/sq mi (730/km^{2})
- Time zone: UTC-7 (Mountain (MST))
  - Summer (DST): UTC-6 (MDT)
- ZIP code: 81423 (PO Box)
- Area code: 970
- FIPS code: 08-54880
- GNIS feature ID: 2413057
- Website: www.norwoodtown.com

Norwood is a statutory town in San Miguel County, Colorado, United States. The population was 535 at the 2020 census.

A post office called Norwood has been in operation since 1887. The community was named after Norwood, Missouri, the native home of a first settler.

== Geography ==
According to the United States Census Bureau, the town has a total area of 0.3 square miles (0.78 km^{2}), all land.

Norwood's rural location on Wright's Mesa led to its 2019 designation as an International Dark Sky Community by the International Dark-Sky Association. Norwood is one of 32 International Dark Sky Communities. Norwood's former state representative, Marc Catlin, passed legislation, Support Dark Sky Designation and Promotion in Colorado, which established the Colorado Designated Dark Sky designation.

=== Climate ===
Climate data for Norwood, Colorado (1991–2020)
Month	Jan	Feb	Mar	Apr	May	Jun	Jul	Aug	Sep	Oct	Nov	Dec	Year
Mean daily maximum °F (°C)	38.9 (3.8)	42.6 (5.9)	52.3 (11.3)	59.2 (15.1)	68.8 (20.4)	80.5 (26.9)	85.2 (29.6)	82.2 (27.9)	75.1 (23.9)	62.4 (16.9)	49.7 (9.8)	39.4 (4.1)	61.4 (16.3)
Daily mean °F (°C)	26.1 (−3.3)	30.3 (−0.9)	38.5 (3.6)	44.8 (7.1)	53.4 (11.9)	63.2 (17.3)	68.9 (20.5)	66.7 (19.3)	59.7 (15.4)	48.0 (8.9)	36.1 (2.3)	26.4 (−3.1)	46.8 (8.3)
Mean daily minimum °F (°C)	13.3 (−10.4)	17.9 (−7.8)	24.8 (−4.0)	30.5 (−0.8)	38.1 (3.4)	45.9 (7.7)	52.6 (11.4)	51.1 (10.6)	44.2 (6.8)	33.5 (0.8)	22.5 (−5.3)	13.5 (−10.3)	32.3 (0.2)
Average precipitation inches (mm)	0.90 (23)	0.74 (19)	0.97 (25)	1.13 (29)	1.18 (30)	0.66 (17)	2.00 (51)	2.17 (55)	2.04 (52)	1.48 (38)	1.31 (33)	1.17 (30)	15.75 (402)
Average snowfall inches (cm)	12.0 (30)	10.4 (26)	8.0 (20)	4.2 (11)	0.6 (1.5)	0.0 (0.0)	0.0 (0.0)	0.0 (0.0)	0.2 (0.51)	2.1 (5.3)	11.9 (30)	10.4 (26)	59.8 (150.31)
Source: NOAA

== Demographics ==
Historical population
Census	Pop.	Note	%±
1910	212		—
1920	365		72.2%
1930	299		−18.1%
1940	412		37.8%
1950	294		−28.6%
1960	443		50.7%
1970	408		−7.9%
1980	478		17.2%
1990	429		−10.3%
2000	438		2.1%
2010	518		18.3%
2020	535		3.3%
United States Census Bureau

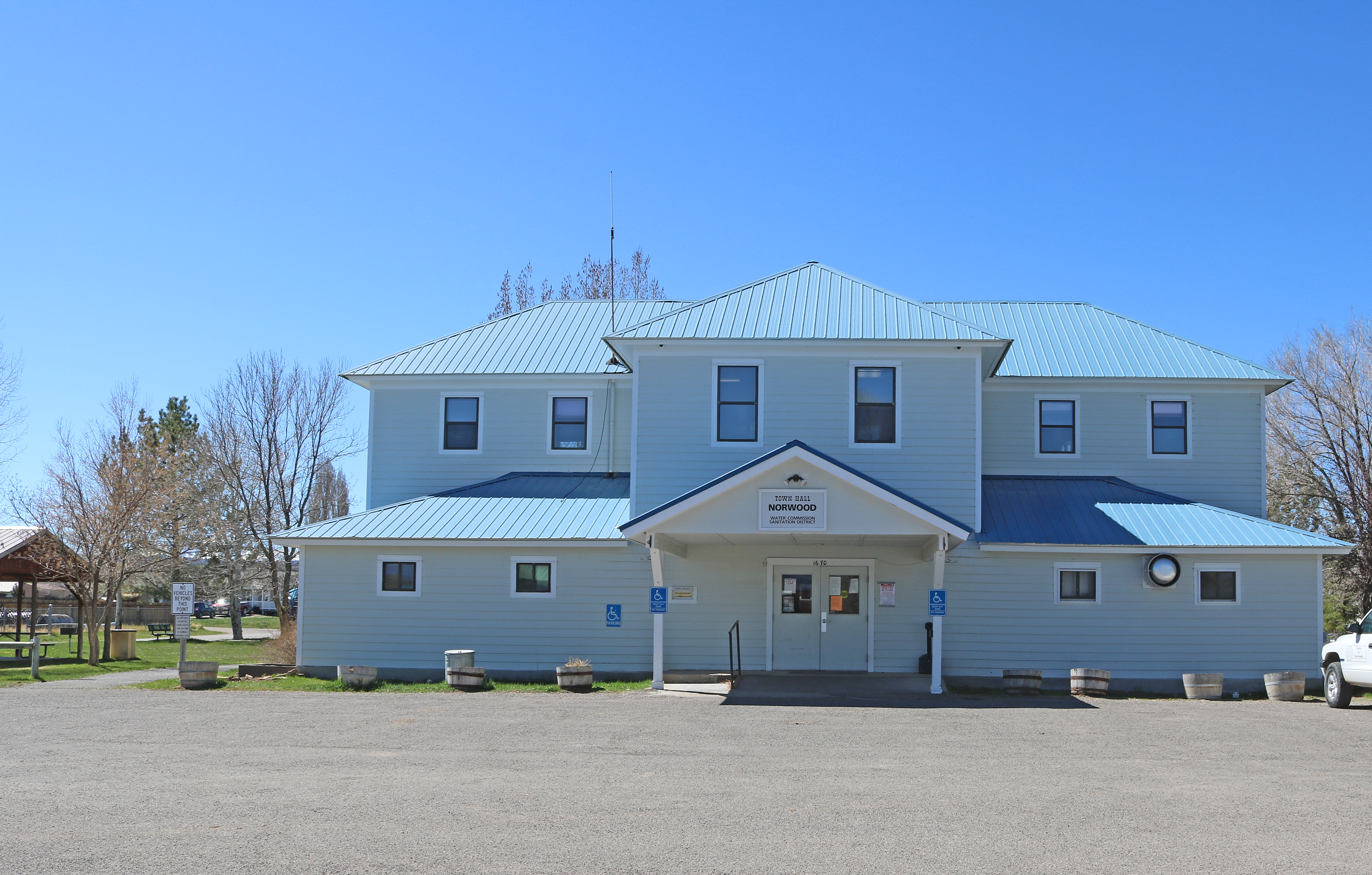
Norwood Town Hall

As of the census of 2000, there were 438 people, 195 households, and 112 families residing in the town. The population density was 1,709.7 inhabitants per square mile (660.1/km^{2}). There were 258 housing units at an average density of 1,007.1 units per square mile (388.8 units/km^{2}). The racial makeup of the town was 97.49% White, 1.60% Native American, 0.23% from other races, and 0.68% from two or more races. Hispanic or Latino of any race were 5.48% of the population.

There were 195 households, out of which 27.2% had children under the age of 18 living with them, 45.6% were married couples living together, 6.7% had a female householder with no husband present, and 42.1% were non-families. 35.4% of all households were made up of individuals, and 7.7% had someone living alone who was 65 years of age or older. The average household size was 2.25 and the average family size was 2.92.

In the town, the population was spread out, with 24.4% under the age of 18, 10.0% from 18 to 24, 32.0% from 25 to 44, 25.3% from 45 to 64, and 8.2% who were 65 years of age or older. The median age was 38 years. For every 100 females, there were 105.6 males. For every 100 females age 18 and over, there were 95.9 males.

The median income for a household in the town was $39,375, and the median income for a family was $50,313. Males had a median income of $33,750 versus $22,813 for females. The per capita income for the town was $19,687. None of the families and 5.6% of the population were living below the poverty line, including no under eighteens and 20.6% of those over 64.

== Education ==
It is in the Norwood School District R-2J.

== Notable people ==
- Christine Boskoff (1967-2006), American mountain climber, killed by an avalanche on Ge'nyen Massif in China.
- Robert B. Duffield (1917–2000), radiochemist who headed the Argonne National Laboratory.
- Charlie Fowler (1954–2006), American mountain climber, writer, and photographer.

== See also ==
- List of municipalities in Colorado
