= Robert Birkby =

American guide and author

Robert C. Birkby
- Website: http://robertbirkby.com/

Robert C. Birkby is an American trail designer and an author who authors Boy Scout handbooks.

Birkby grew up in Sidney, Iowa. As a Boy Scout, Birkby was on staff at summer camp, made a trek at Philmont Scout Ranch and earned Eagle Scout. While attending college, he spent his summer breaks working at Philmont in positions such as a trail crew foreman and director of conservation.

After college, Birkby was an English instructor at Missouri State University. He thru-hiked the Appalachian Trail. Moving to Seattle, he became an author, writing magazine articles for Boys' Life and merit badge pamphlets on subjects such as backpacking. He worked for the Student Conservation Association, directing trail building across the US.

Birkby met Scott Fischer in 1982, and was convinced to climb Mount Olympus. He then worked for Fischer's adventure travel company Mountain Madness as a writer and guide, co-leading adventure trips to the Cascade Range, Alaska, Mount Kilimanjaro, Mount Elbrus and Nepal. After Fischer's death in the 1996 Everest disaster, Birkby wrote the biography Mountain Madness.

Starting in 2008, Birkby aided in the construction of the Great Baikal Trail, an environmental trail system along Lake Baikal in Siberia.

== Works ==
- Boy Scout Handbook (10th ed.). Boy Scouts of America. 1990. ISBN 0-8395-3229-6. #33229.
- Boy Scout Handbook (11th ed.). Boy Scouts of America. 1998. ISBN 0-8395-3105-2. #32105.
- Boy Scout Handbook (12th ed.). Boy Scouts of America. 2009. ISBN 978-0-8395-3102-9. #34554.
- Fieldbook (4th ed.). Boy Scouts of America. 2004. ISBN 0-8395-3104-4.
- Backpacking. Boy Scouts of America.
- Conservation Handbook. Boy Scouts of America. 1991. ISBN 0-8395-3570-8.
- The T.R.A.I.L. Boss Manual. Boy Scouts of America.
- Mountain Madness. Citadel. 2009. ISBN 978-0-8065-2876-2.
- Lightly on the Land: The SCA Trail Building and Maintenance Manual. The Mountaineers Books. 1996. ISBN 0-89886-848-3.
- Learn How to Canoe in One Day. Stackpole. 1990. ISBN 0-8117-2249-X.
