= Lenggu Monastery =

Tibetan Buddhist monastery in Sichuan, China

Coordinates: 29°49′09″N 99°38′37″E

Lenggu Monastery (Chinese: 冷谷寺; pinyin: Lěnggǔ Sì; Tibetan: གནས་སྒོ་དགོན, Wylie: gnas sgo dgon), also transliterated as Rengo Monastery or Nego Monastery, is a Tibetan Buddhist monastery at the foot of Ge'nyen Mountain in Sichuan, China. The monastery was formerly known as Kambo Dansar and was the first monastery built by the first Kamapa Duisung Chenpa in 1164. The 7th Kamapa Quzha Qiangcuo enlarged it. At its peak, over 2000 monks studied at the monastery. Today, Lengu is administered as part of Zhamla Township in Litang County, Garze Prefecture, Sichuan.

Lenggu is one of a great many Tibetan monasteries and temples scattered across the Tibetan plateau, and has suffered a great deal of decline in the decades following the Chinese Invasion of Tibet. Once visited by many hundreds of pilgrims a year, the monastery's out-buildings are now largely in a state of decay. At the height of its activity, there were over 2000 resident monks; nowadays, only a small number remain.

== History ==
Lenggu became a Yellow Sect monastery by about the year 1690.
