= Mountain Madness =

American mountaineering and adventure travel company

- Industry: Mountaineering guides
- Founded: 1984
- Founders: Scott Fischer, Wes Krause, and Michael Allison
- Headquarters: White Center, Seattle, Washington
- Key people: Christine Boskoff, Anatoli Boukreev, Charlie Fowler
- Services: Adventure travel, rock climbing, peak ascents
- Owner: Lisa Thompson
- Website: mountainmadness.com

Mountain Madness is a Seattle-based mountaineering and trekking company. The company specializes in mountain adventure travel and has a training school for mountain and rock climbing.

== History ==
=== Fischer and Krause ===
In 1984, Scott Fischer, Wes Krause, and Michael Allison, each a mountaineering guide, co-founded Mountain Madness. Although Fischer had decided in the early 1970s that he would one day have a guide service named Mountain Madness, the founders did not incorporate the company until 1984. Fischer anchored the Seattle operations while Krause concentrated his efforts in Africa. Allison soon sold his share to his partners so that he could pursue other interests.

While leading Mountain Madness, Fischer became renowned for his ascents of the world's highest mountains without the use of supplemental oxygen. He and Wally Berg were the first Americans to summit Lhotse, the world's fourth highest mountain (27,940 feet / 8,516 m), located next to Mount Everest. Fischer and Ed Viesturs were the first Americans to summit K2 (28,251 feet / 8,611m), in the Karakoram of Pakistan, without supplemental oxygen.

During his stewardship of Mountain Madness, Fischer led social and environmental initiatives to help people in the countries in which Mountain Madness traveled. As the leaders of the 1994 Sagarmatha Environmental Expedition, Fischer and Rob Hess both summited Mount Everest without supplemental oxygen. Later that year, the American Alpine Club awarded the David Brower Conservation Award, "an annual award recognizing leadership and commitment to preserving mountain regions worldwide," to all members of the expedition. Fischer also led the 1996 Climb for CARE expedition on Mount Kilimanjaro (19,341 feet / 5,895 m) in Africa. This endeavor raised nearly a million dollars for the relief organization.

After 23 years of mountaineering and 12 years of guiding Mountain Madness, Fischer died in the 1996 Mount Everest disaster while leading an expedition and descending from the summit.

=== The Boskoffs ===
In 1997, the year after Scott Fischer's death, Keith and Christine Boskoff purchased Mountain Madness. In 1999 Keith died, leaving his widow Christine to run Mountain Madness on her own. She led expeditions for about three months that year and planned to ring in the year 2000 on the top of Mount Kilimanjaro, with a group of climbing clients.

Mountain Madness broadened its adventure travel offerings to include a new genre of trips: "adventure treks" that include both trekking and climbing options. The company earned accreditation by the American Mountain Guides Association as a commitment to "high technical standards, strong programs, and a quality staff of engaged and engaging climbing instructors and guides."

Nine years into her tenure as the owner and leader of Mountain Madness, in the fall of 2006, Christine Boskoff and Charlie Fowler, another well-known American climber and Mountain Madness guide, died in an avalanche while climbing near Lenggu Monastery on Genyen Mountain, in Sichuan Province in southwest China.

=== Mark Gunlogson ===
The loss of both of the company's owners presented new challenges for Mountain Madness, so in 2008, Mark Gunlogson, who began guiding for Mountain Madness in 1993, took over. Since 2000, he had been the company's business operations manager, and he was the president and majority owner until 2025. Mountain Madness continues to operate as a well-known and respected international adventure travel company. Mountain Madness currently concentrates on expeditions to the Seven Summits, on mountaineering schools, and on trekking.

== Owners and guides ==
- Scott Fischer (d. 1996)
- Neal Beidleman (b. 1960)
- Anatoli Boukreev (d. 1997)
- Keith Boskoff (d. 1999)
- Christine Boskoff (d. 2006)
- Charlie Fowler (d. 2006)
- Mark Gunlogson (2008−2025)
- Lisa Thompson (current owner)

== See also ==
- Adventure Consultants
- Timeline of the 1996 Mount Everest disaster

== Bibliography ==
- Birkby, Robert (2008). Mountain Madness: Scott Fischer, Mount Everest and a Life Lived On High. New York, NY: Citadel Press/Kensington Publishing Corp. ISBN 9780806528755. OCLC 882611111.
- Garton, Johanna (2020). Edge of the map : the mountain life of Christine Boskoff. Seattle, WA: Mountaineers Books. ISBN 9781680512885. OCLC 1119761109.
