= Jello Tower =

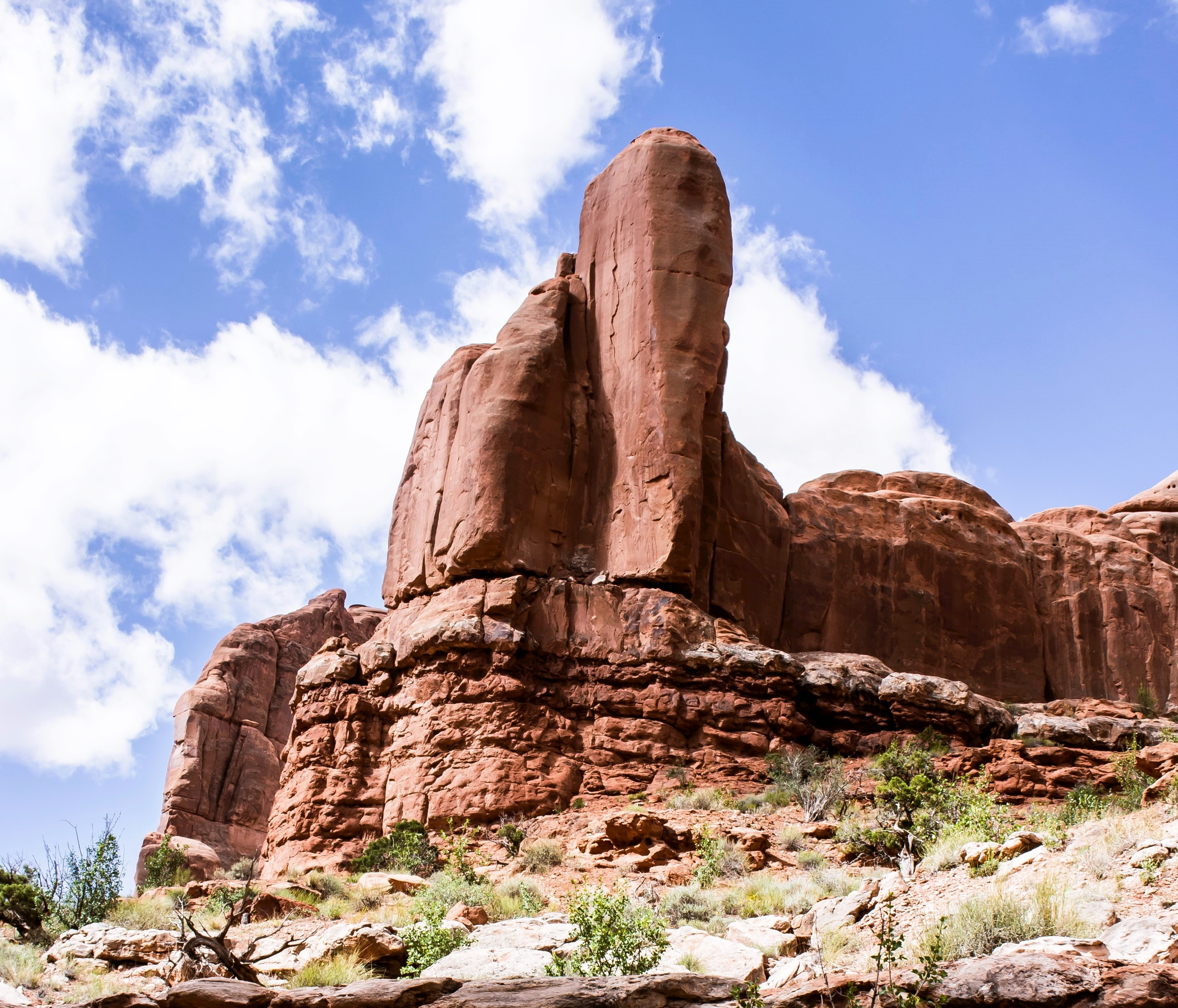
- North aspect

Highest point
- Elevation: 4,510 ft (1,375 m)
- Isolation: 0.42 mi (0.68 km)
- Coordinates: 38°37′47″N 109°36′07″W

Geography
- Location within Utah Location within the United States
- Country: United States
- State: Utah
- County: Grand
- Protected area: Arches National Park
- Parent range: Colorado Plateau
- Topo map: USGS The Windows Section

Geology
- Rock age: Jurassic
- Rock type: Entrada Sandstone

Climbing
- First ascent: 1986
- Easiest route: class 5.10+

Jello Tower is a 4,510-foot-elevation (1,375-meter) pillar in Grand County, Utah, United States.

== Description ==
Jello Tower is located within the Park Avenue section of Arches National Park and like many of the rock formations in the park, it is composed of Entrada Sandstone, specifically the Slick Rock Member overlaying the Dewey Bridge Member. Topographic relief is significant as the summit rises 130 feet (40 meters) above the Park Avenue Trail in 150 feet (46 meters) laterally. Precipitation runoff from Jello Tower drains to the Colorado River via Courthouse Wash. The first ascent of the summit was made in November 1986 by Charlie Fowler and Sue Wint via Soft Parade rock-climbing route. This landform was shown briefly in the opening scene of the 1989 American action-adventure film Indiana Jones and the Last Crusade.

== Climate ==
According to the Köppen climate classification system, Jello Tower is located in a cold semi-arid climate zone with cold winters and hot summers. Spring and fall are the most favorable seasons to experience Arches National Park, when highs average 60 to 80 °F (15 to 25 °C) and lows average 30 to 50 °F (0 to 10 °C). Summer temperatures often exceed 100 °F (40 °C). Winters are cold, with highs averaging 30 to 50 °F (0 to 10 °C), and lows averaging 0 to 20 °F (−20 to −5 °C). As part of a high desert region, it can experience wide daily temperature fluctuations. The park receives an average of less than 10 inches (25 cm) of rain annually.

== Gallery ==
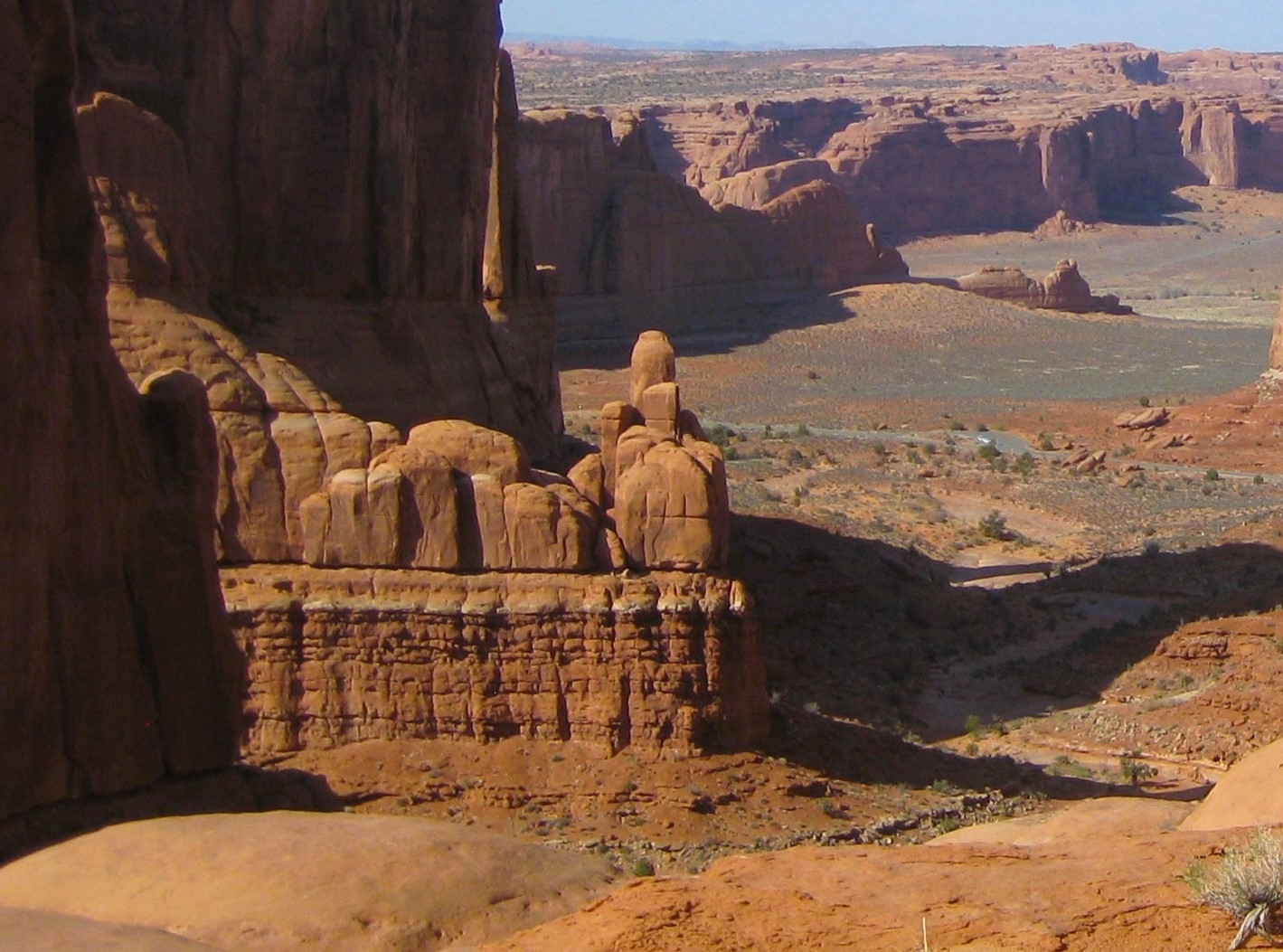
Jello Tower centered

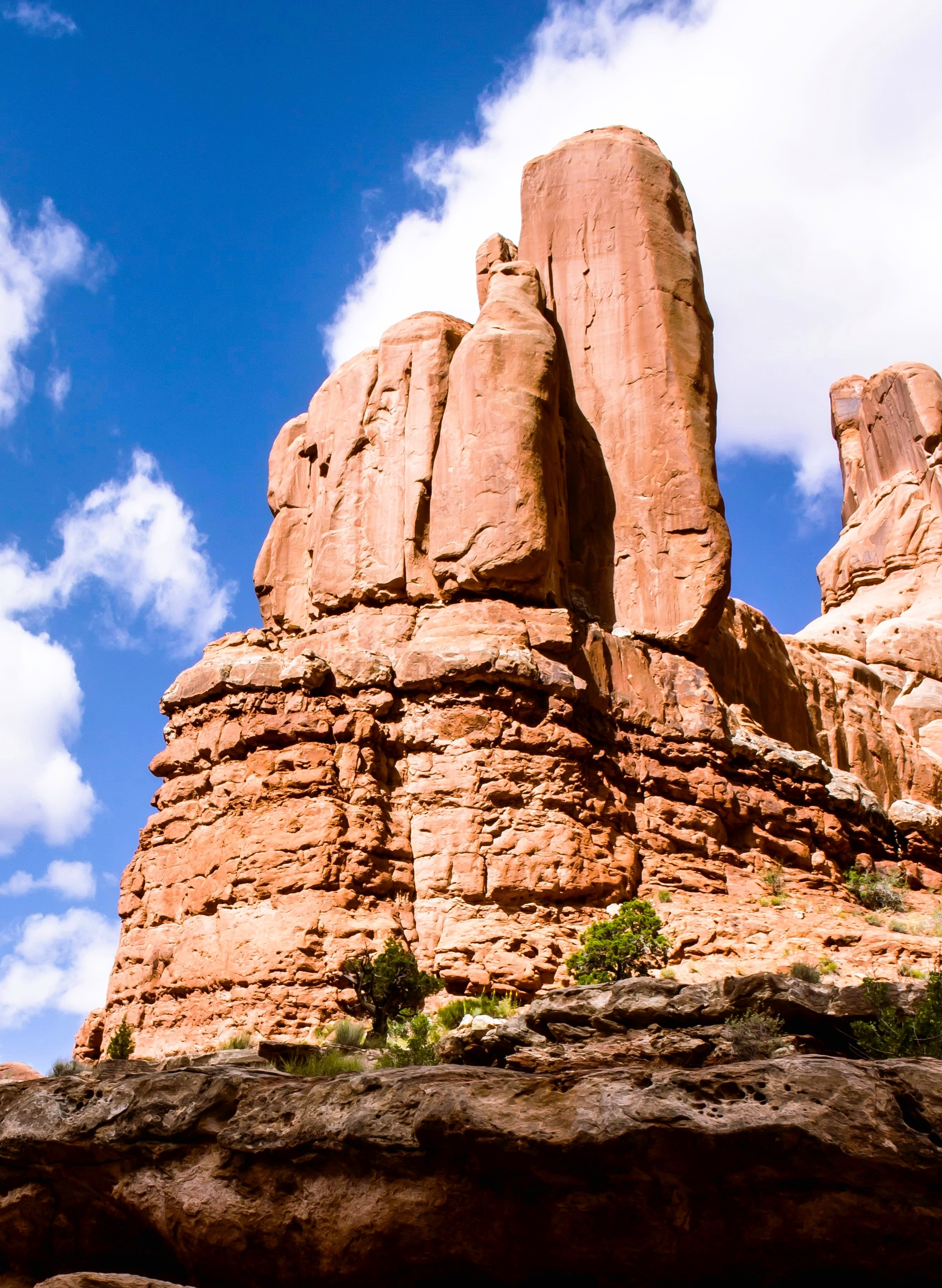
Northeast aspect

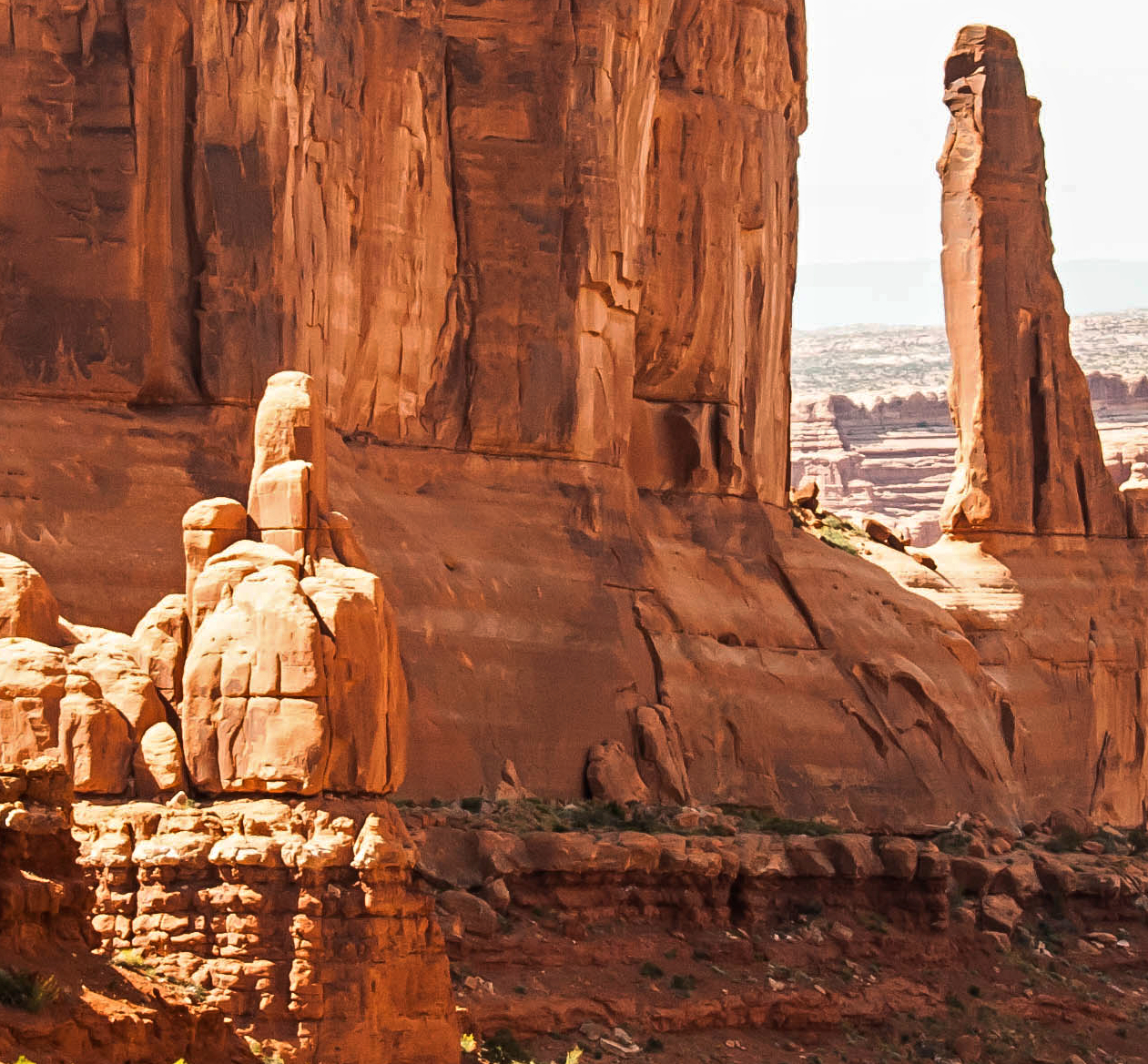
Jello Tower (left) and Argon Tower (right)

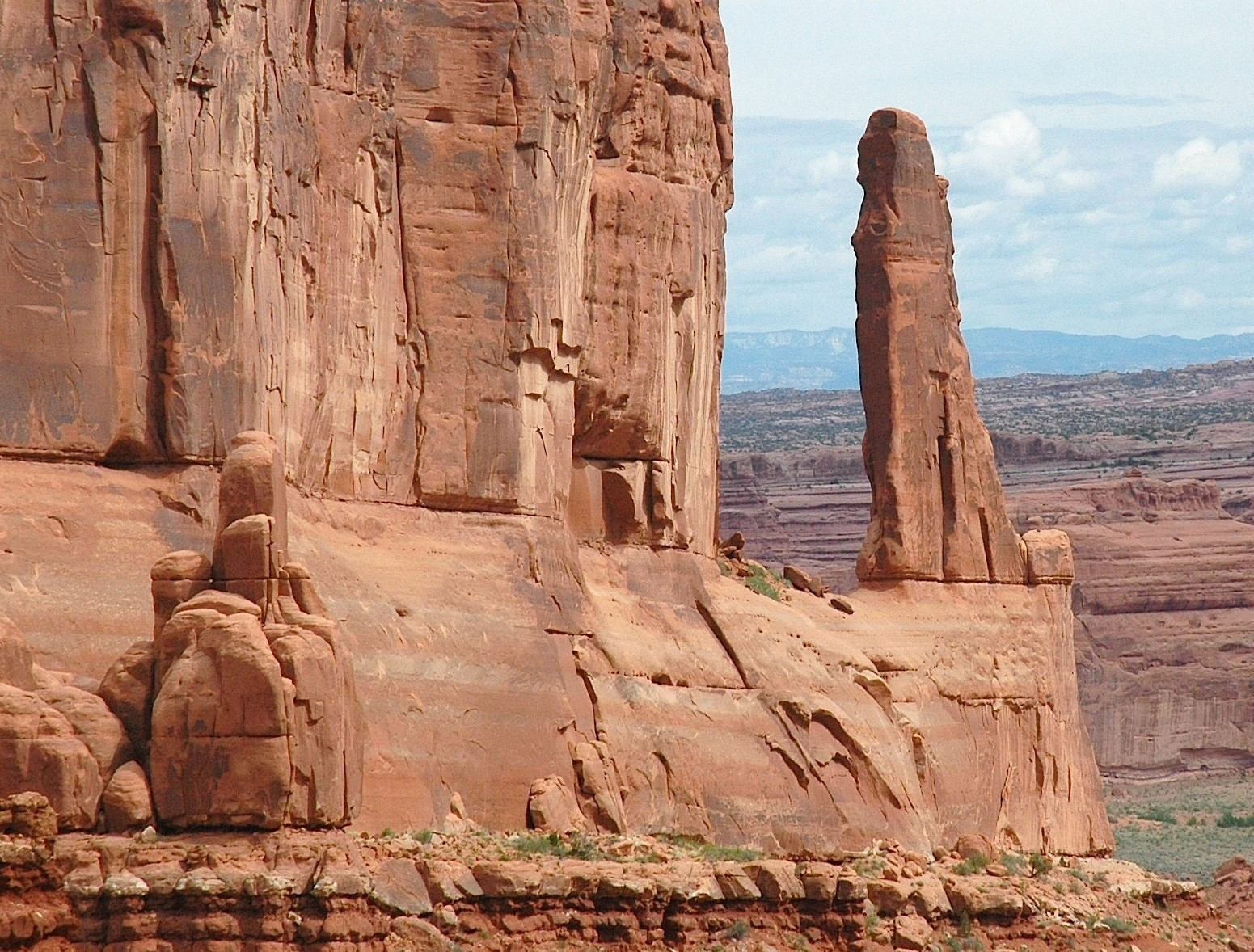
Jello Tower (lower left) and Argon Tower (right)

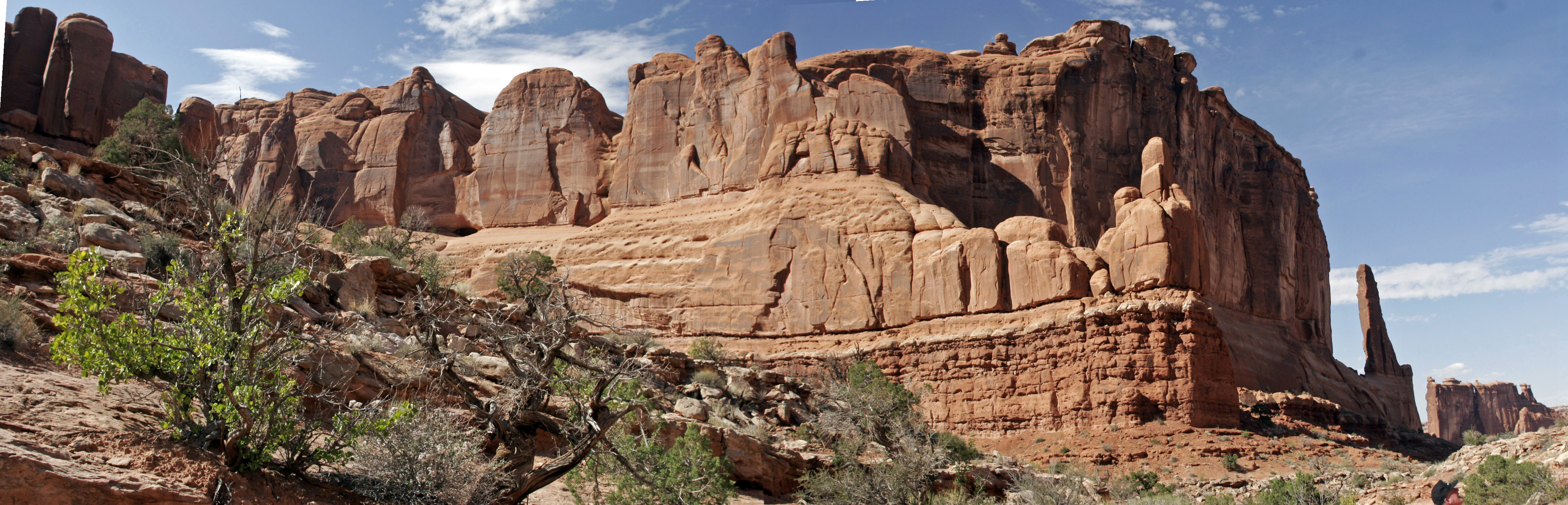
Jello Tower (right) viewed from Park Avenue Trail

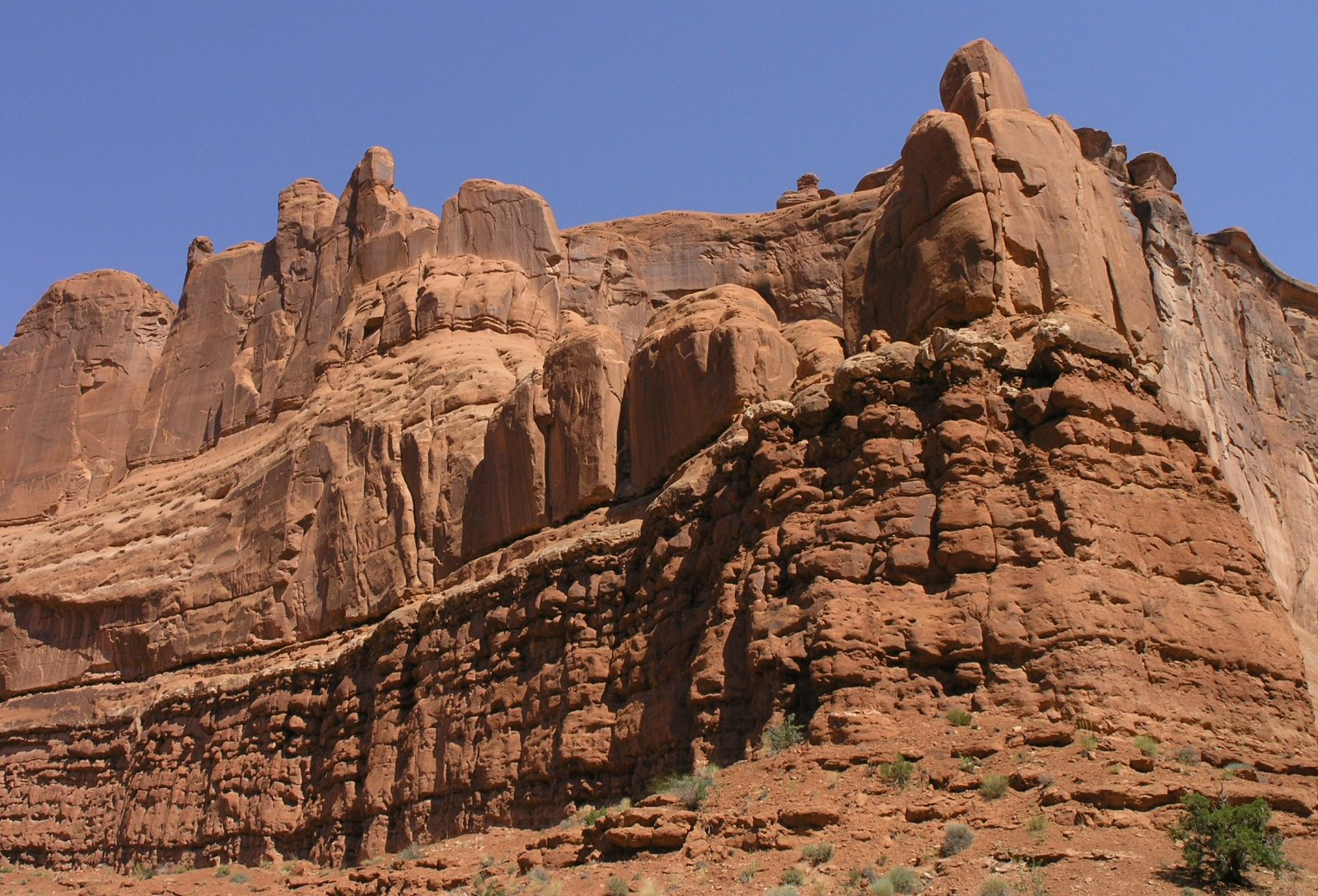
Jello Tower is upper right (ESE aspect)

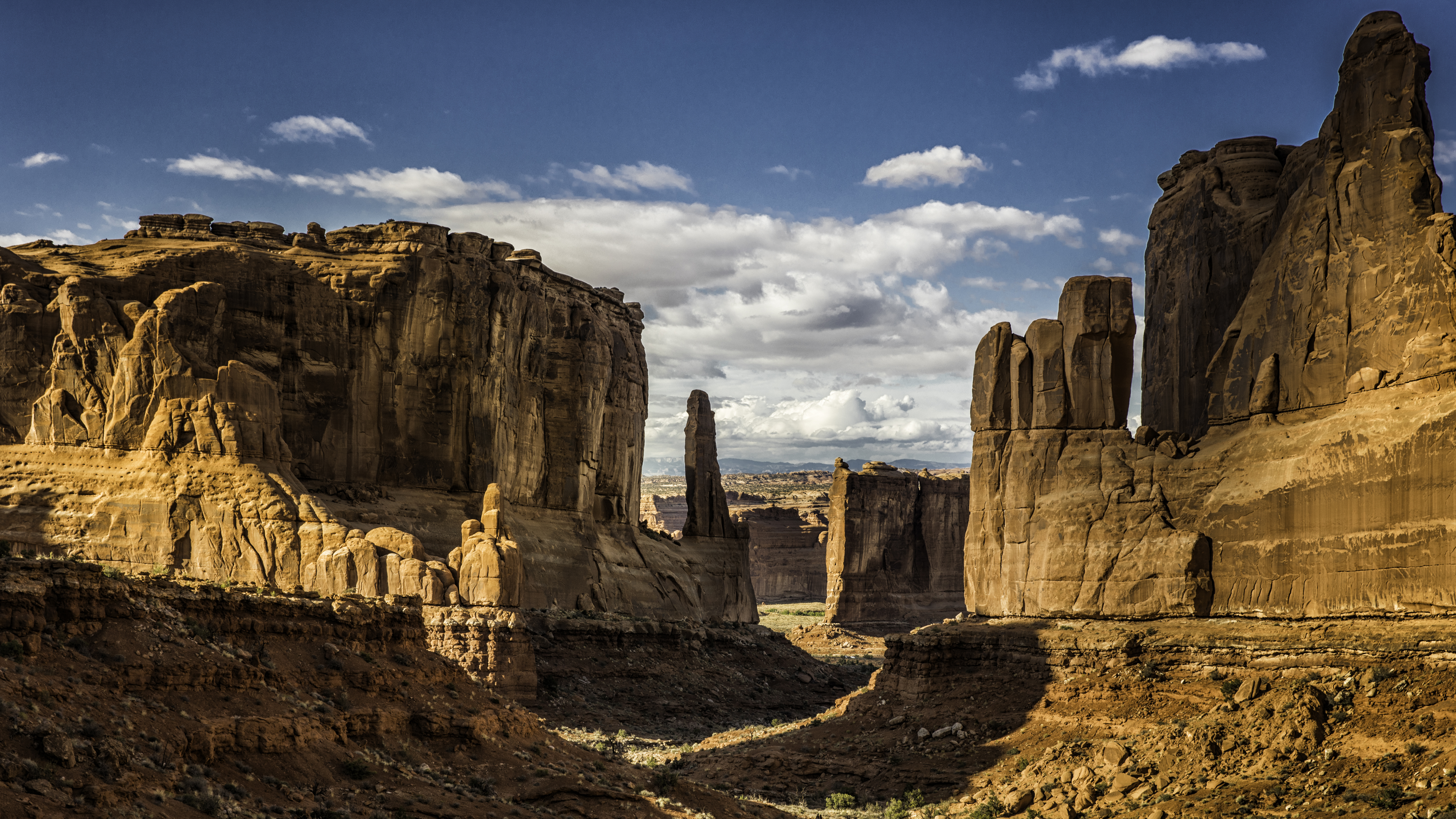
The view from Park Avenue Overlook. Jello Tower illuminated, left of center.

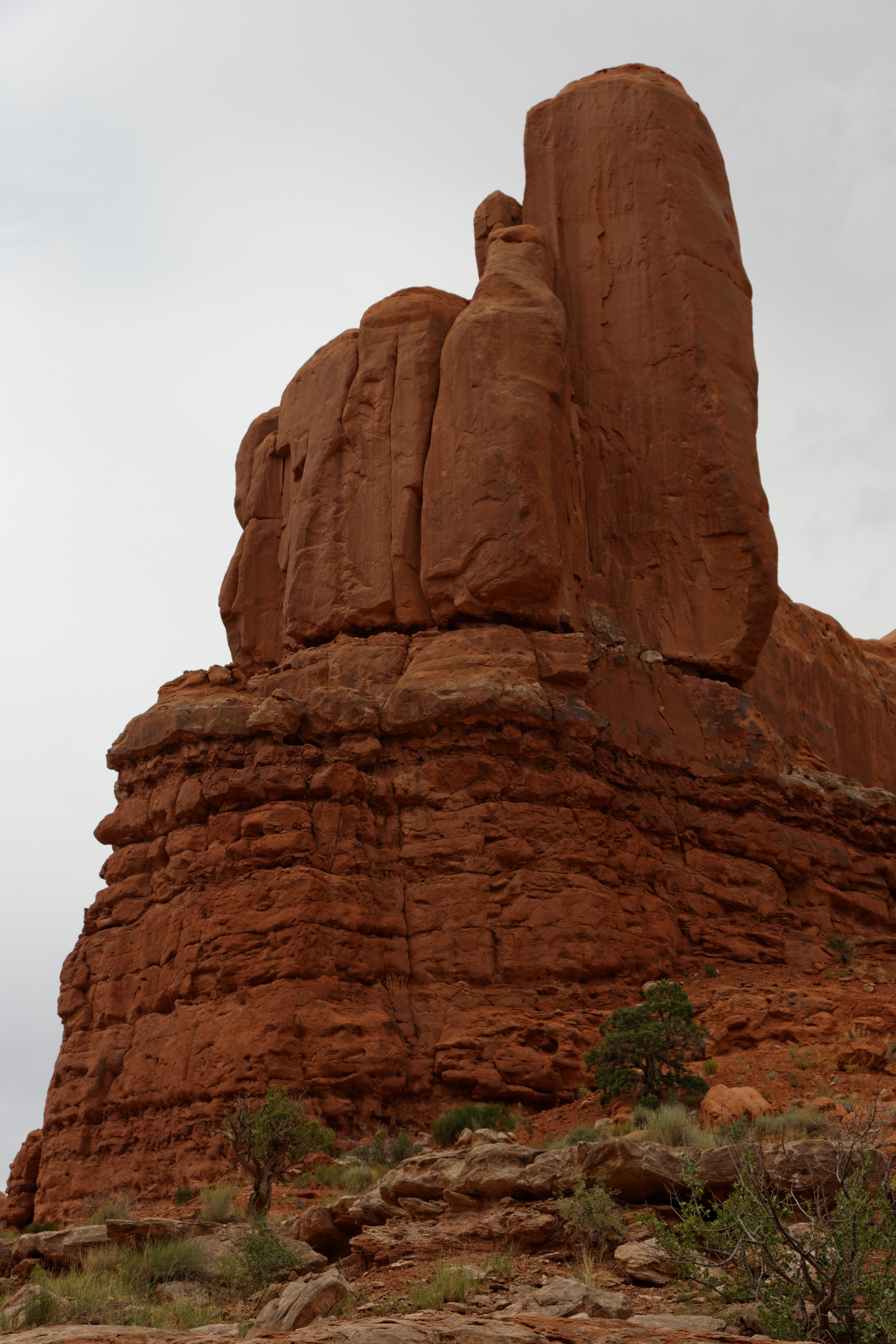
Northeast aspect

== See also ==
- Geology of Utah
