= Ge'nyen Massif =

Mountain in Sichuan province, China

- Location within Sichuan

Highest point
- Elevation: 6,204 m (20,354 ft)
- Prominence: 2,000 m (6,600 ft)
- Listing: Ultra-prominent peak
- Coordinates: 29°50′N 99°42′E

Geography
- Location: Litang County, Sichuan
- Country: China
- Parent range: West Sichuan

Climbing
- First ascent: 1988 by a Japanese team

The Ge'nyen Massif (simplified Chinese: 格聂峰; traditional Chinese: 格聶峰; pinyin: Géniè Fēng; Tibetan: སྐར་མ་རི་བོ་, Wylie: skar ma ri bo), is a mountain in the Shaluli Mountains of western Sichuan province, China. With an elevation of 6,204 metres (20,354 ft), it is the third highest peak in the province. It was first climbed in 1988 by a Japanese team.

The Ge'nyen massif is regarded as the 13th most holy mountain among the 24 holy mountains of Tibetan Buddhism. Lenggu Monastery is located in a steep valley at the base of the mountain's eastern flank.

== Ascents ==
In 1988, the first recorded ascent of the Genyen Massif was made by a Japanese team. They were followed by an Italian group who used a new route on the east face. In autumn 2006, Christine Boskoff (of Mountain Madness adventure company) and Charlie Fowler, another well-known American climber and Mountain Madness guide, went missing near Ge'nyen. It was later determined that they had died in an avalanche while climbing near Lenggu Monastery on Ge'nyen Mountain.

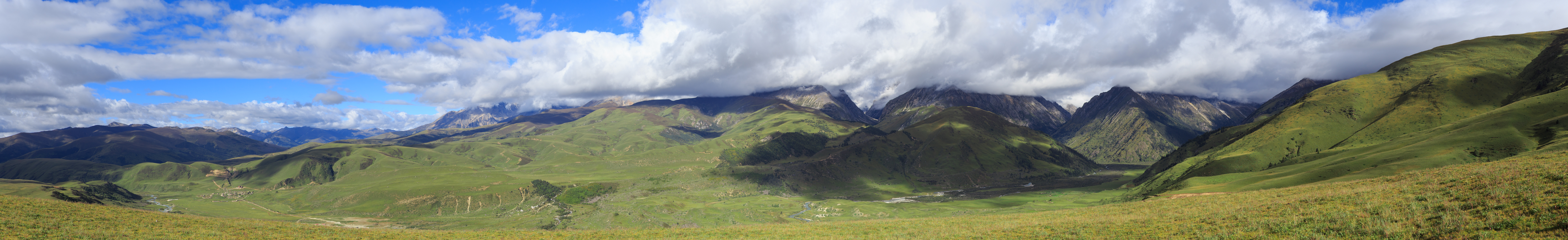
Ge'nyen

== See also ==
- List of ultras of Tibet, East Asia and neighbouring areas
