= Tengboche Monastery =

Tibetan Buddhist monastery in Nepal

Tengboche Monastery Dawa Choling Gompa Thyangboche Monastery
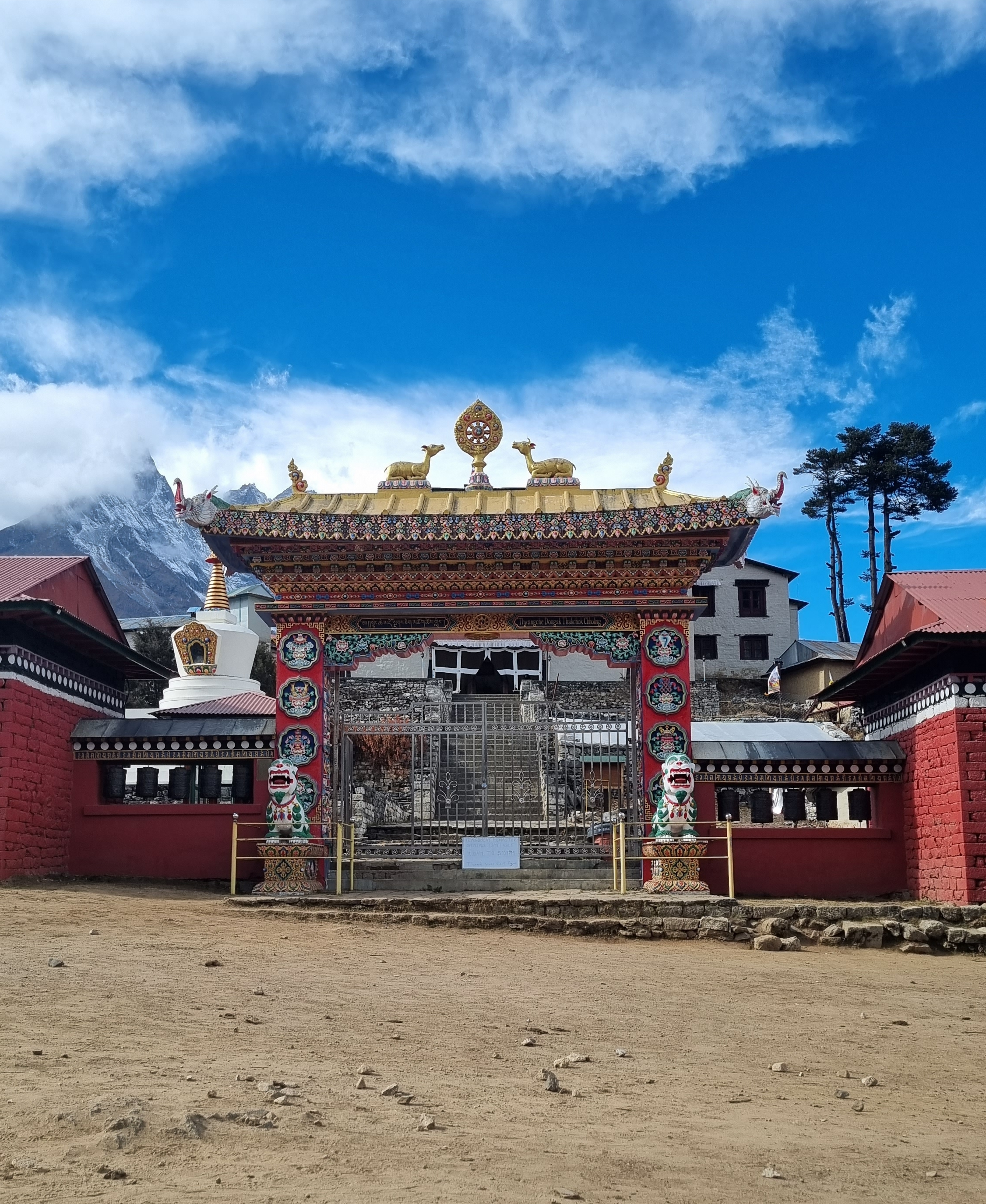
- Tengboche monastery

- Location within Nepal

Religion
- Affiliation: Tibetan Buddhism
- Sect: Nyingma
- Festival: Mani Rimdu

Location
- Location: Khumjung, Khumbu, Nepal
- Country: Nepal
- Coordinates: 27°50′01″N 86°41′59.85″E

Architecture
- Style: Tibetan architecture
- Founder: Lama Lama Gulu in
- Completed: 1916 rebuilt in 1934
- Located within the Sagarmatha National Park

Tengboche Monastery

Tengboche Monastery (or Thyangboche Monastery), also known as Dawa Choling Gompa, in the Tengboche village in Khumjung in the Khumbu region of eastern Nepal is a Tibetan Buddhist monastery of the Sherpa community. Situated at 3,867 metres (12,687 ft), the monastery is the largest gompa in the Khumbu region of Nepal. It was built in 1916 by Lama Gulu with strong links to its mother monastery known as the Rongbuk Monastery in Tibet. In 1934, it was destroyed by an earthquake and was subsequently rebuilt. In 1989, it was destroyed for a second time by a fire and then rebuilt with the help of volunteers and international assistance.

Tengboche monastery is amidst the Sagarmatha National Park (a UNESCO World Heritage Site of "outstanding universal value”), draped with a panoramic view of the Himalayan Mountains, including the well-known peaks of Tawache, Everest, Nuptse, Lhotse, Ama Dablam, and Thamserku.

Tengboche is the terminus site of the "Sacred Sites Trail Project" of the Sagarmatha National Park that attracts large number of tourists for trekking and mountaineering. It is a circular trail that covers 10 monasteries in a clockwise direction terminating in the Tengboche Monastery.

== History ==
The Khumbu valley, where the monastery is, came under the influence of Buddhism about 350 years back. Ancient scriptures of Tibet refer to this valley along with Rowlang and Khanbalung valleys as sacred places. Lama Sangwa Dorje is referred to as the founder of the oldest monastery in Khumbu at Pangboche as well as many other small hermitages. His divine psychic knowledge and clairvoyant vision had prophesied suitability of establishing a monastery at Tengboche based on a footprint on a rock left by him while meditating.

However, the actual establishment of the monastery happened only during Ngawang Tenzin Norbu's time; Norbu was considered Sangwa Dorje's fifth incarnation. He had established a monastery at Rongbuk in Tibet on the northern face of Mount Everest. He blessed Chatang Chotar, known as Lama Gulu, to found the Tengboche monastery at Tengboche village. As a result, it got established at its present location in 1916. It is the first celibate monastery under the Nyingmapa lineage of the Vajrayana Buddhism. Many older village-level monasteries are close by.

Three wealthy inhabitants of the local Sherpa community are credited with funding building of the monastery. Among these three, Karma was the most influential and well known as he was a tax collector, and he also enjoyed the patronage of the Rana rulers of Nepal. It is said that apart from Khumbu Sherpas, Sherung Sherpas have been involved with building this monastery. Some of the village temples, chortens and smaller religious shrines are predated to 1880, particularly all the large chortens. The Mani wall, made of slabs of stone inscribed with prayers and sacred texts is dated to 1915.

The monastery was destroyed during the 1934 earthquake. Subsequently, Lama Gulu who had built it died. His successor, Umze Gelden, took up the task of rebuilding, with strong support from Ngawang Tenzin Norbu. The monks and the local community, with support from a skilled carpenter from Lhasa, re-established the monastery. Exclusive murals were painted by Kappa Kalden, a renowned artist. With an influx of tourists to the Khumbu region, particularly for trekking by mountaineers, the monastery has received wide recognition.

However, the monastery's precious old scriptures, statues, murals and wood carvings were destroyed in the devastating fire caused by an electrical short circuit on 19 January 1989. The monumental stone credited with Lama Sangwa Dorje's left footprint had fractured. A few trekkers managed to salvage some books and paintings. It has since been completely rebuilt with money donated from around the world.

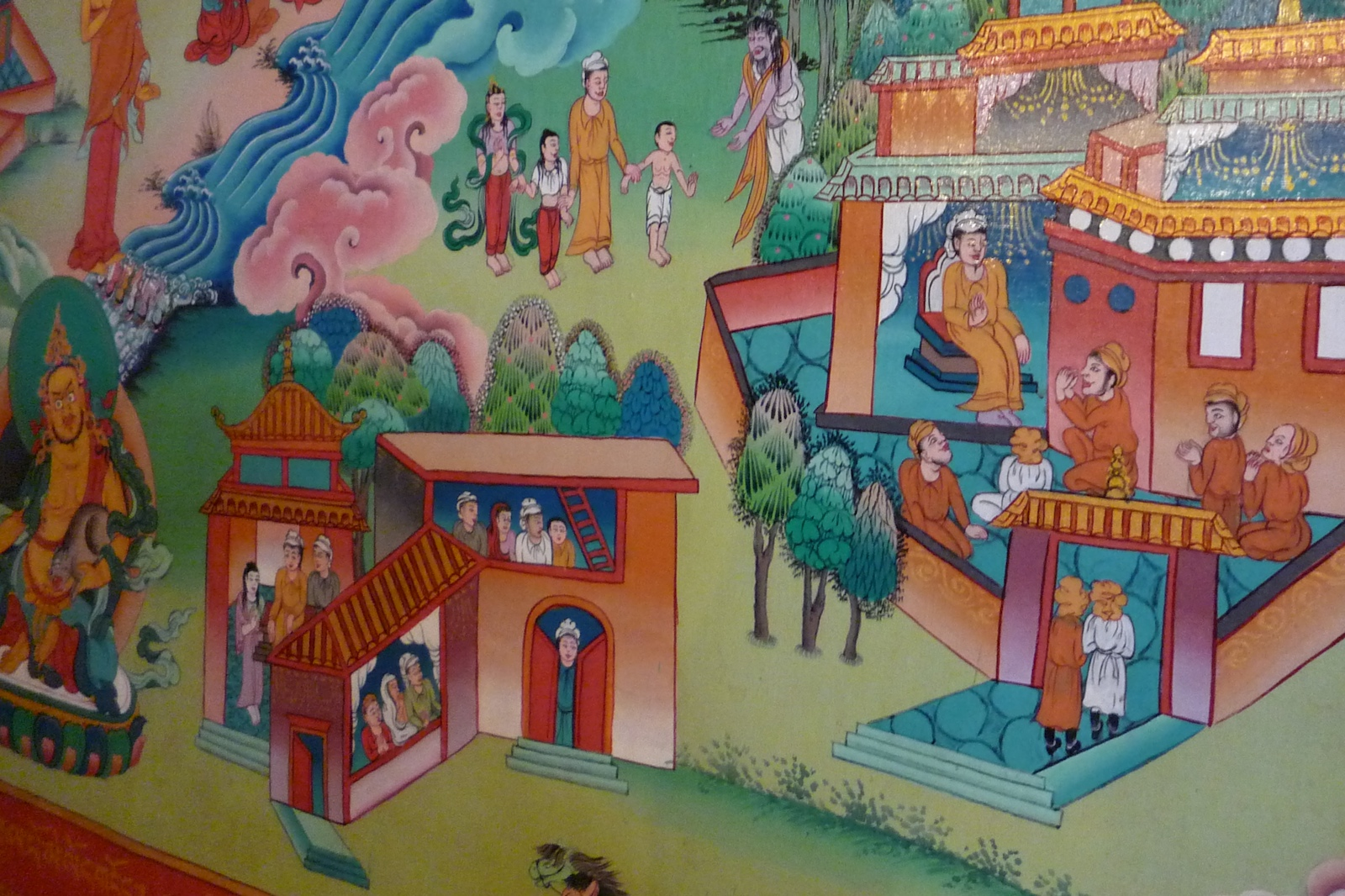
A restored painting in the monastery

Following the destruction of the monastery by fire, its rebuilding was undertaken by the present Nawang Tenzing Jangpo who is considered as the incarnation of the founder Lama Gulu, an important spiritual leader of the Sherpas. He has established an equation with many trekkers and climbers of all denominations who visit the monastery, which has helped him in finding funds for restoration. With due diligence to the set religious practices, the monastery has been substantially rebuilt. Tibetan painter Tarke-la's wall paintings that display the Bodhisattvas or the Buddha decorate the sanctum. In addition, the monks and Sherpa community with help from the Sir Edmund Hillary and Himalayan Trust, the American Himalayan Heritage Foundation and many international well-wishers have shown their support in several ways.

Hillary and Tenzing Norgay, an inhabitant of this village, were the first to reach the summit of Mount Everest on the British 1953 expedition. Thereafter, this monastery has acquired more international interest, as it is on the route to the base camp of Everest for routes made via the Khumbu icefall and west ridge. Everest expeditioners visit the monastery to light candles and seek the blessings of gods for good health and safe mountaineering.

John Hunt, the leader of the 1953 expedition and one of the first mountaineers to visit the monastery (most, but not all, previous expeditions approached the mountain from the northern (Tibetan) side), offered the following description of Thengboche in The Ascent of Everest:

Thyangboche must be one of the most beautiful places in the world. The height is well over 12,000 feet. The Monastery buildings stand upon a knoll at the end of a big spur, which is flung out across the direct axis of the Imja river. Surrounded by satellite dwellings, all quaintly constructed and oddly mediaeval in appearance, it provides a grandstand beyond comparison for the finest mountain scenery that I have ever seen, whether in the Himalaya or elsewhere.

—

The rebuilt monastery was formally consecrated in 1993 and is considered as the gateway to Mount Everest. The religious room of the Guru Rimpoche in the monastery was fully restored in September 2008. The entrance gate has also been rebuilt with funds provided by the Greater Himalayas Foundation based in Washington DC, United States.

The monastery is said to be home to 60 monks reflecting its financial prosperity. It is also said that fewer and fewer young boys join as monks as they prefer to work in mountaineering or trekking-related activities.

== Geography ==
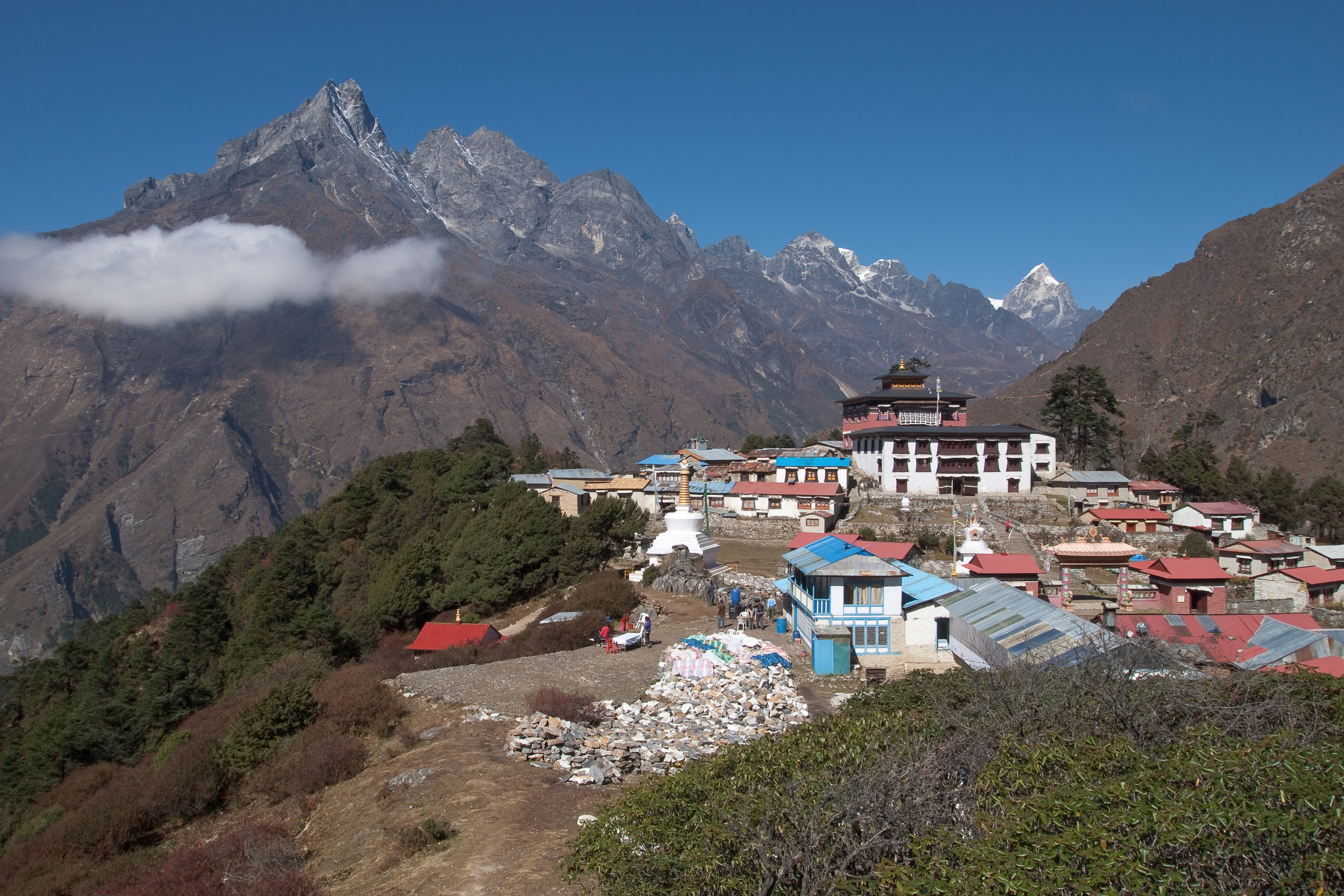
Monastery amidst Sagarmata peaks

Tengboche Monastery is located on a hill at the confluence of the Dudh Kosi and the Imja Khola rivers. It lies in Khumbu district to the north east of Kathmandu on the Nepal – Tibet border. It is inhabited by sherpas ('sherpa' literally means the easterner) who migrated from Tibet six hundred years ago. The monastery is approached by a mountain trail from Namche, via the nearest airport in Lukla (2,800 metres (9,200 ft)) connecting to Kathmandu.

Its approach is by a hard three days of trekking from Lukla. However, considering acclimatization needs for the high altitude climbing, a four-day trek is generally preferred. This trail crosses initially the Dudh Kosi (3,250 metres (10,660 ft)) river and a further climb leads to the Tengboche monastery at 3,870 metres (12,700 ft) altitude. A downhill trek leads to Devouche, the nunnery. The backdrop to the monastery is provided, particularly during winter, by the shining snow clad peak of Ama Dablam, the tip of the Everest that glows from the Lotse ridge and several other peaks. Tengboche is the mid-way station of the trail to the base camp for the climbers of Mount Everest and other peaks of over 8,000 metres (26,000 ft); all these areas form part of the entire Kumbhu region up to Tibet border with an area of 1,148 square kilometres (443 sq mi) encompassing the Sagarmatha National park. In the Kumbu region of Nepal, the monastery is strategically placed on the way to Everest base camp and thus attracts large number of tourists from all parts of the world. During the spring season, hill slopes around Tengboche are covered with flowering rhododendrons.

== Structures ==
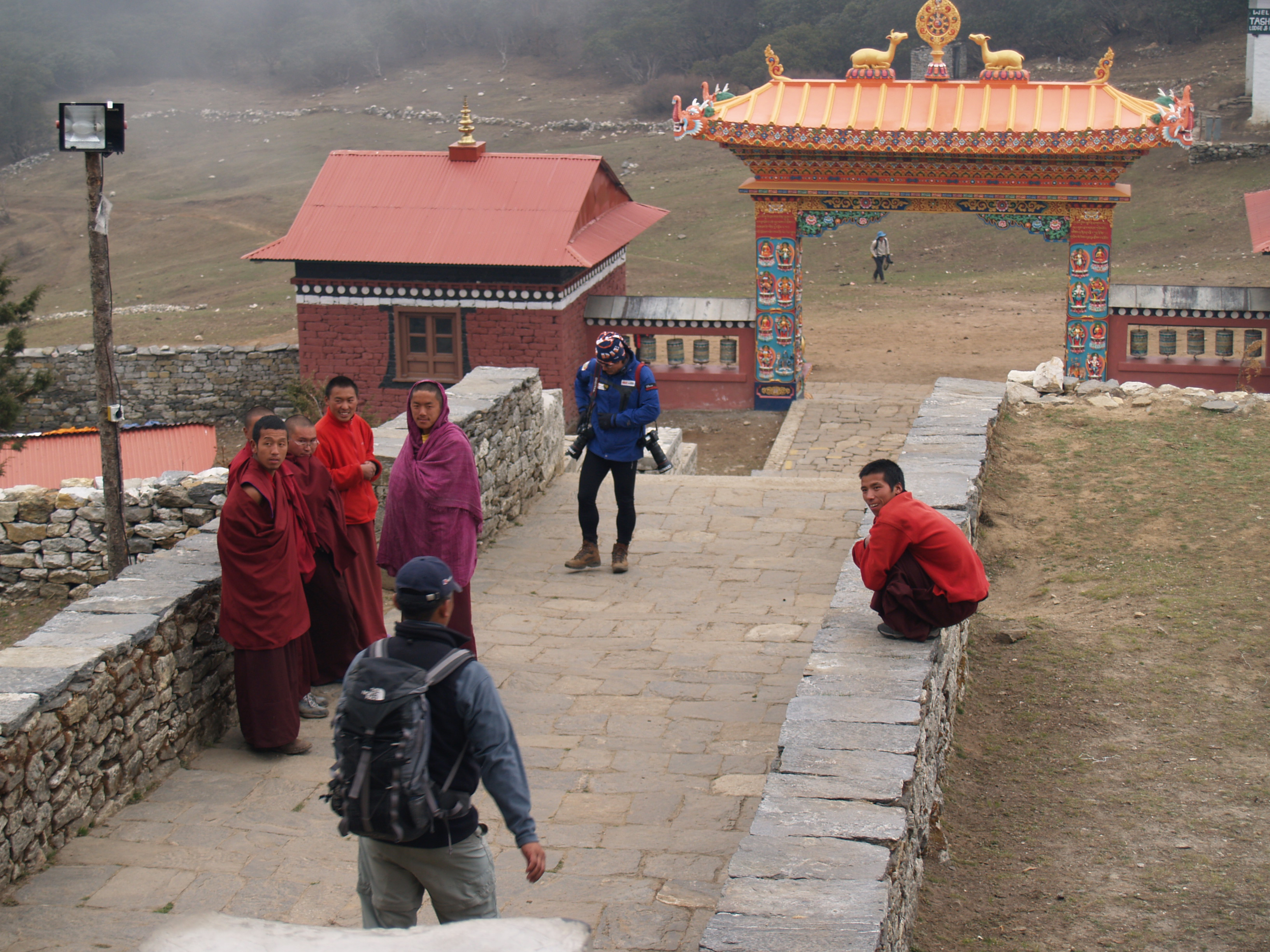
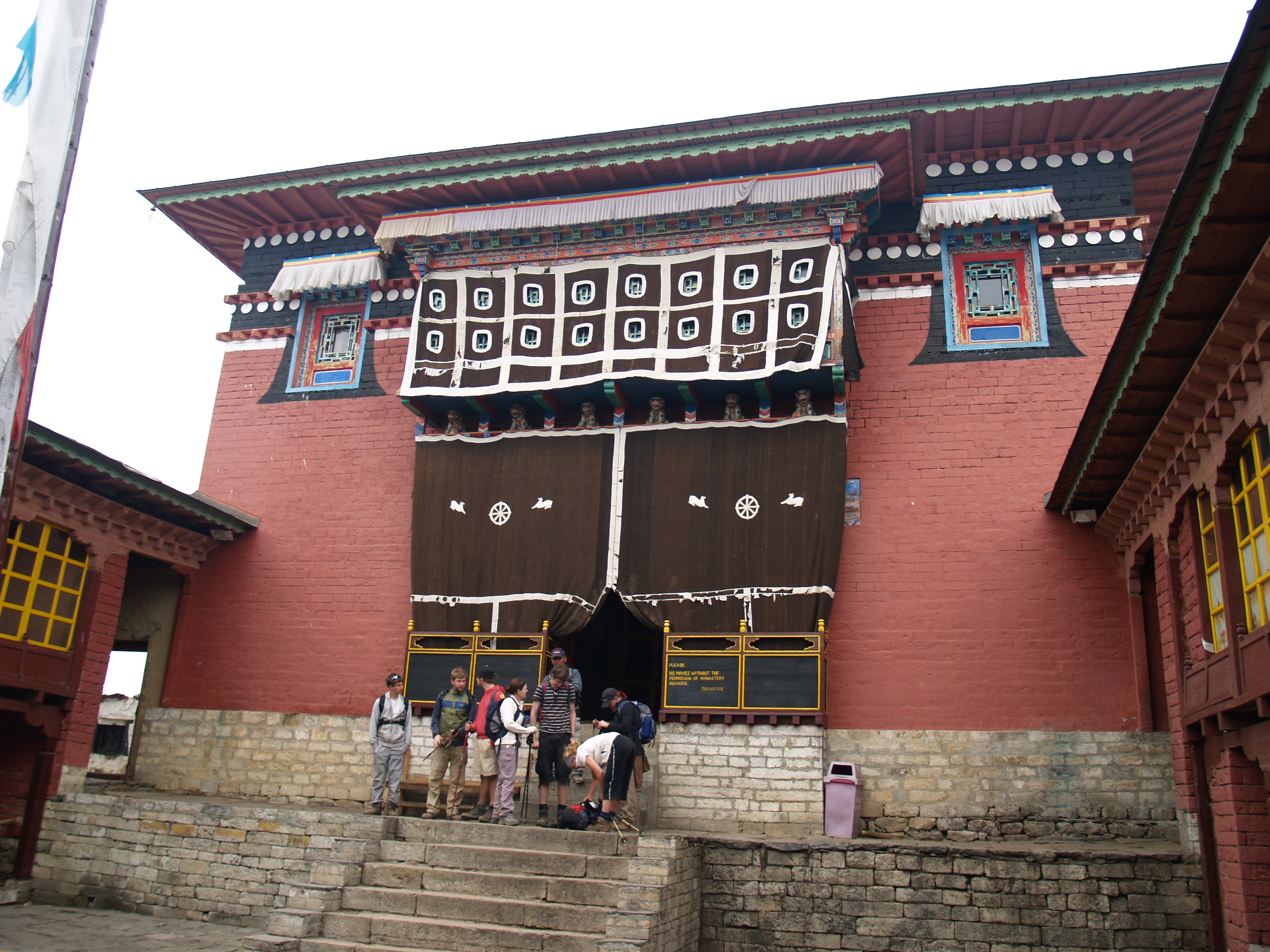
Left: Entrance to the monastery. Right: Tengboche Monastery

The current monastery is constructed with stone masonry. The courtyard and storerooms are large to facilitate the monks' religious rites and activities. The main building has the mandatory Dokhang, the prayer hall, where a large statue of Shakyamuni Buddha is deified. The statue extends to two floors of the monastery and encompasses the Ser sang lha khang, the first floor shrine room. Sakyamuni Buddha is flanked by Manjushri, the deity of wisdom and Maitreya the future Buddha. The scriptures of the Kangyur, the original teachings of the Buddha translated into Tibetan are part of the sanctum.

The rebuilt monastery is a large and impressive structure with a camping area in its front and a number of lodges. Tengboche is surrounded by ancient mani stones (flat stones inscribed with the mantra "Om Mane Padme Hum", prayer flags flying atop the high peaks (flags are flown in colours denoting the five Buddhist elements: earth, wind, fire, water and consciousness).

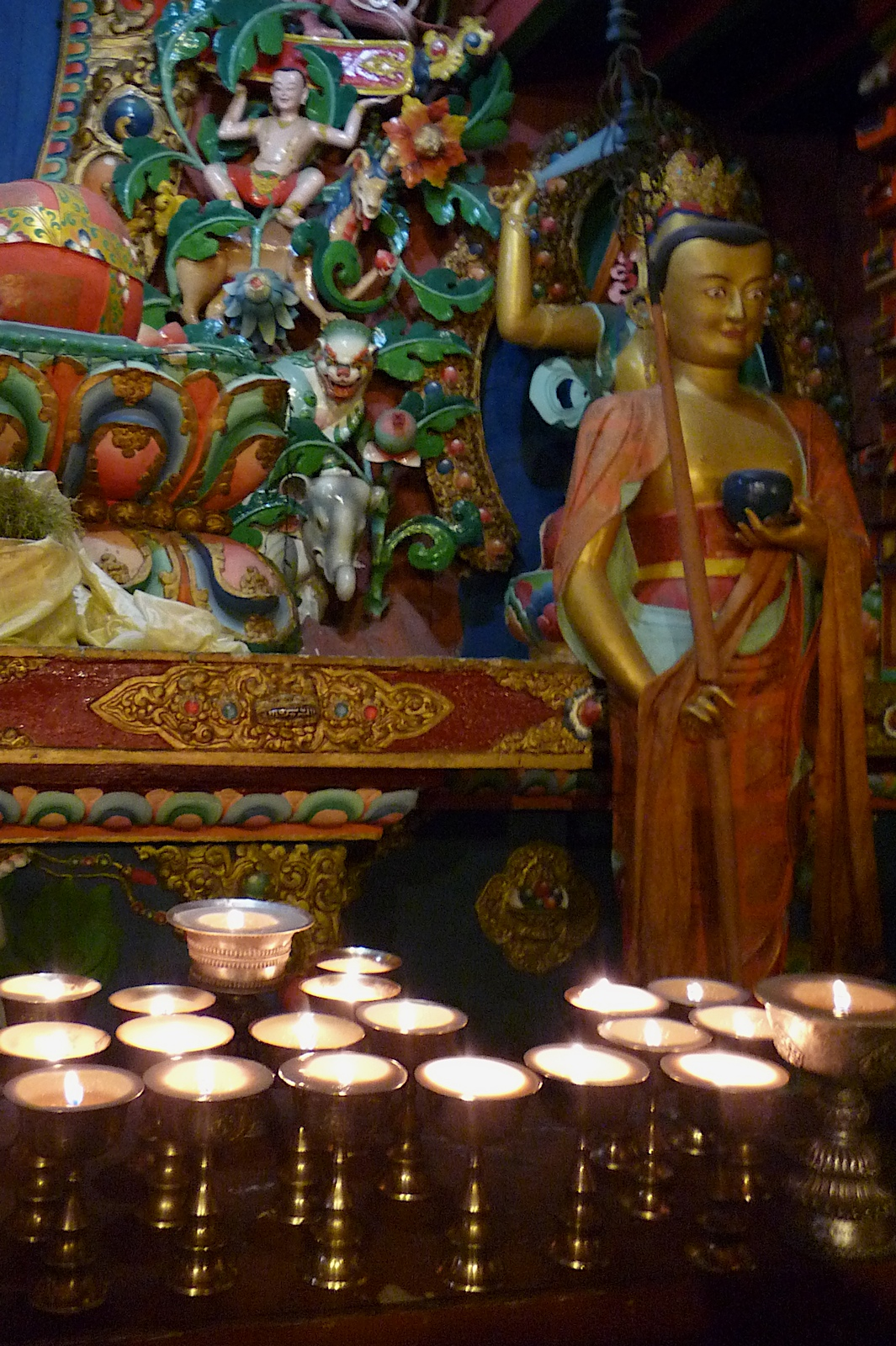
A deity in the main Sanctum

Although the original paintings of the monastery were dated to the 14th century, according to Fuerer Haimendorf, the present set of paintings was produced in the 20th century. The mural paintings, Thangka paintings and sculptural collections, according to the art critic Tucci are:

motifs of differing origin and baroque exuberance of workmanship are underlined by a certain heaviness of design and concern not to leave any space unfilled

Tucci further elaborates on the exaggerated depictions in Tibetan art forms:

Even the shape of the Tibetan utensils and furniture is overblown. The bulging teapots, rather short necked with their high domed lids have none of the lightness of the Persian or Chinese ones.

Nunnery

Vajrayana Buddhism does not restrict its teachings of Buddhism to male or female. In fact, during the initial years of establishing the Tengboche Monastery, nuns studied and practiced Buddhism here. However, over the years, when the nuns wanted an exclusive place of their own to live and pray, the Lama Gulu, head of the monastery granted them land in a small valley known as Devoche. The nunnery was then established at Devoche, a short walk from the Tengboche. This small nunnery, administered by the Tengboche, is called Devoche or Debuche Nunnery (Ani). It is at an elevation of 3,800 metres (12,500 ft). It was built amidst rhododendron and juniper forests. At one time, fifteen nuns resided here, but now only nine old nuns live in this place in poverty stricken conditions. Many nuns have even left to pursue studies in Kathmandu and India.

Other monasteries

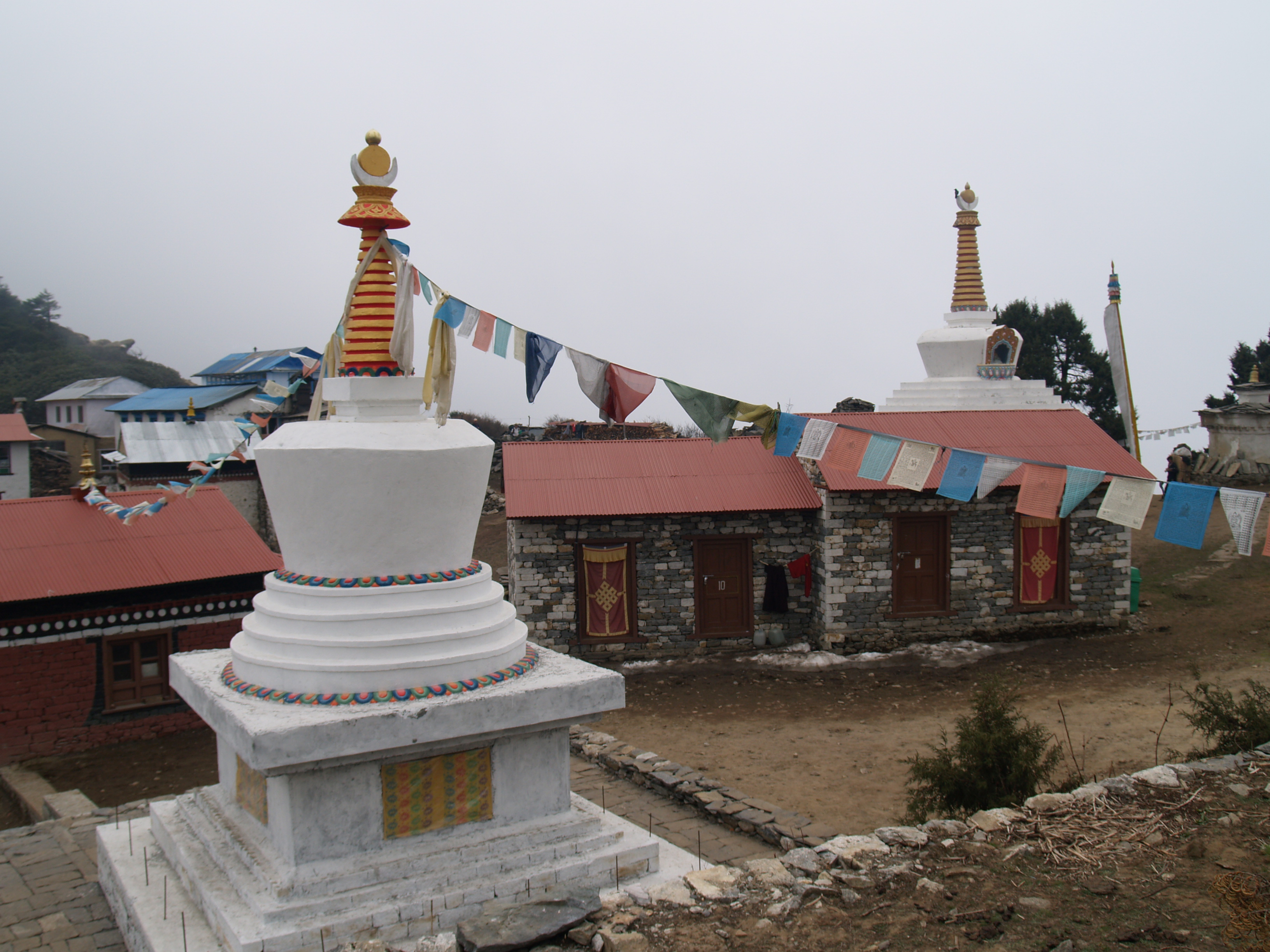
Chortens in Tengboche village

In the nearby villages, there are many other chortens, small monasteries and hermitages including those at Pangboche, Thame, Lawdo, Khumjung and Kunde.

Further improvements

Even though the monastery was rebuilt after the fire, there was lack of many facilities such as reliable and safe drinking water, electricity and so forth. A 'Master Plan' was prepared by specialists, funds collected and projects launched, which have resulted in developing a water supply system that is providing clean drinking water to Tengboche (even during the coldest months), a micro hydropower station that provides assured electricity, establishment of sacred land for high altitude medicinal herb plantation close to the monastery, an Eco-Centre to promote sustainable tourism, better toilets and accommodation for porters, income generating schemes to sustain the local population and most importantly establishing schools for better education facilities to local people.

== Mani Rimdu Festival ==
Mani Rimdu is the most important festival of the Sherpa people. It is held during the tenth lunar month of the Tibetan calendar, corresponding to October–November of the Gregorian calendar. It falls on the autumn season when large groups of tourists visit the Khumbu region to trek to Everest Base Camp and to witness the festival which lasts for nineteen days. The religious festivities involve ceremonies and meditation (Drupchen). The meaning attributed to "Mani Rimdu" is that ‘Mani’ means “part of the chant of Chenrezig” and ‘Rilbu’ or ‘Rimdu’ means small red pills that are blessed during the festival. The red pills are blessed repeatedly and then distributed to all those who attend.

The festival is a tradition passed on from its mother monastery, the Rongbuk. It begins with an elaborate depiction of the mandala diagram made with coloured sand. This sand is extracted from a specified location in the hills. The mandala takes four days to draw; it is then covered and is central to the religious festival that lasts for the next 10 days. The program includes 16 dance numbers with interludes for comical effect. Finally, after all the devotees have left, the monks perform a fire rite to dispel all harm to the world. The sand mandala specially created for the festival is then formally removed with prayers for the benefit of all sentient beings. At the end of the festivities the resident Tengboche Rinpoche of the monastery blesses the general public after which the 'Mask Dances' are performed by the monks. The monks perform the masked dance to usher some of the protective deities as manifestation of the legendary saint Guru Rinpoche, the founder of Tibetan Buddhism; the dance numbers also display the defeat of demons and the initiation of Buddhism to Tibet.

Thus, Tengboche Monastery and Mani Rimdu are major attractions for tourists in Nepal. The number of tourists visiting the monastery is said to be about 15,000 per year and during peak tourist season the number is said to be 600 per week.

== In popular culture ==
The monastery is mentioned in the lyrics to Kate Bush's song "Wild Man" on her album 50 Words for Snow.

Musician Brett Dennen has a song on his album Por Favor called "Tengboche"

The monastery is featured in the movie Everest.

The 1989 fire is featured in Starhawk's book Walking to Mercury.

== Gallery ==
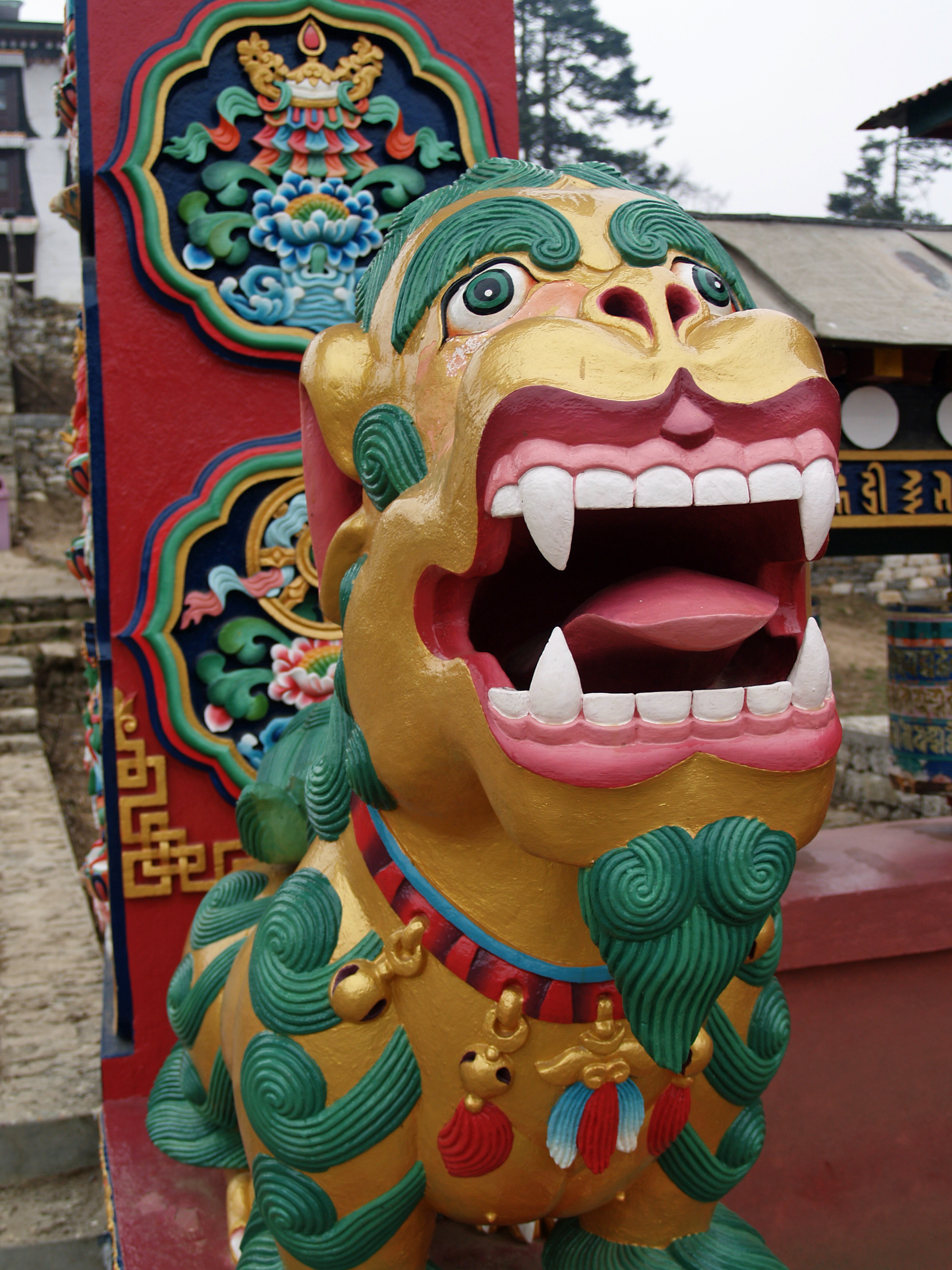
A statue at the entrance

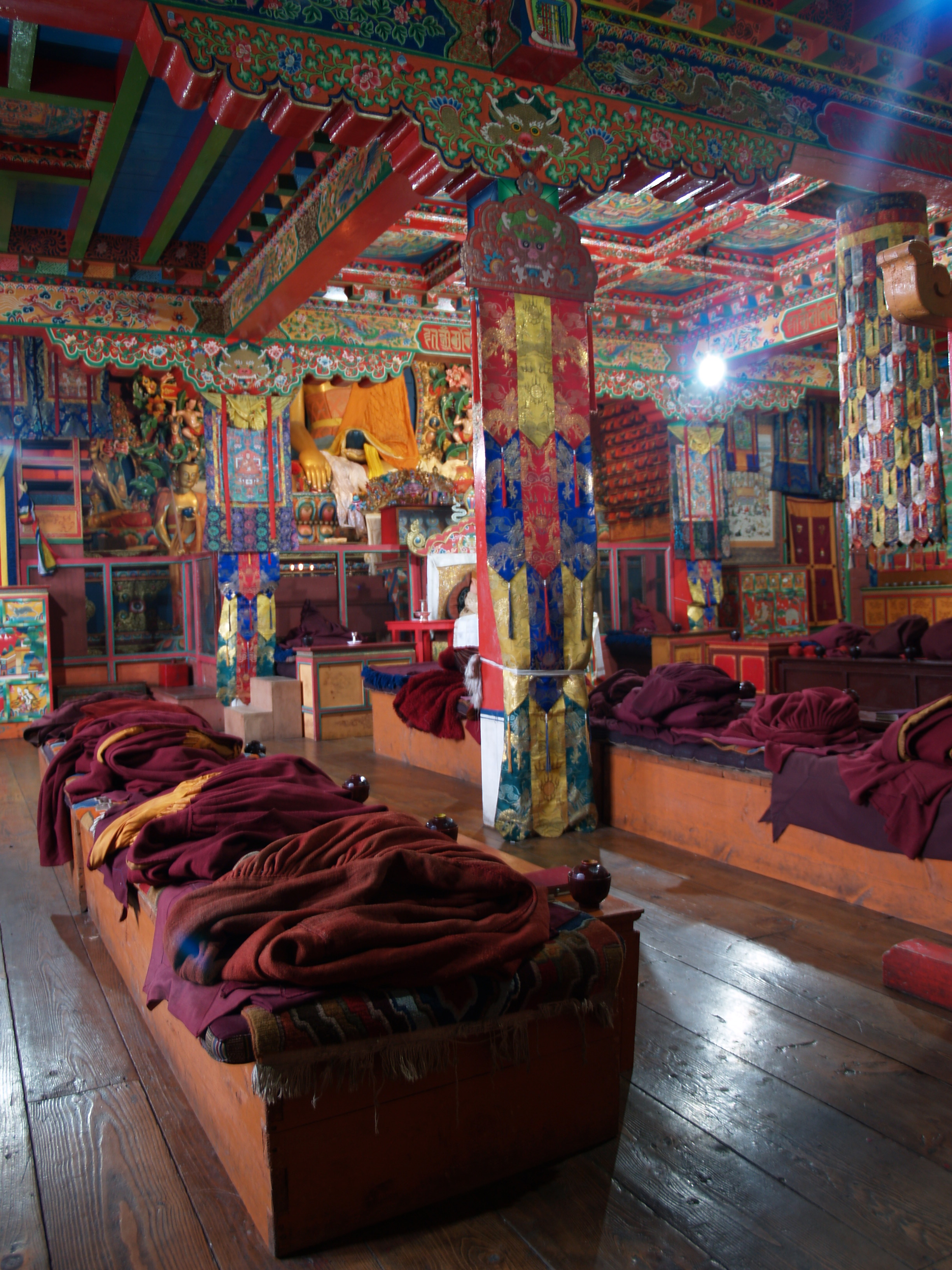
Painting and mural inside the monastery

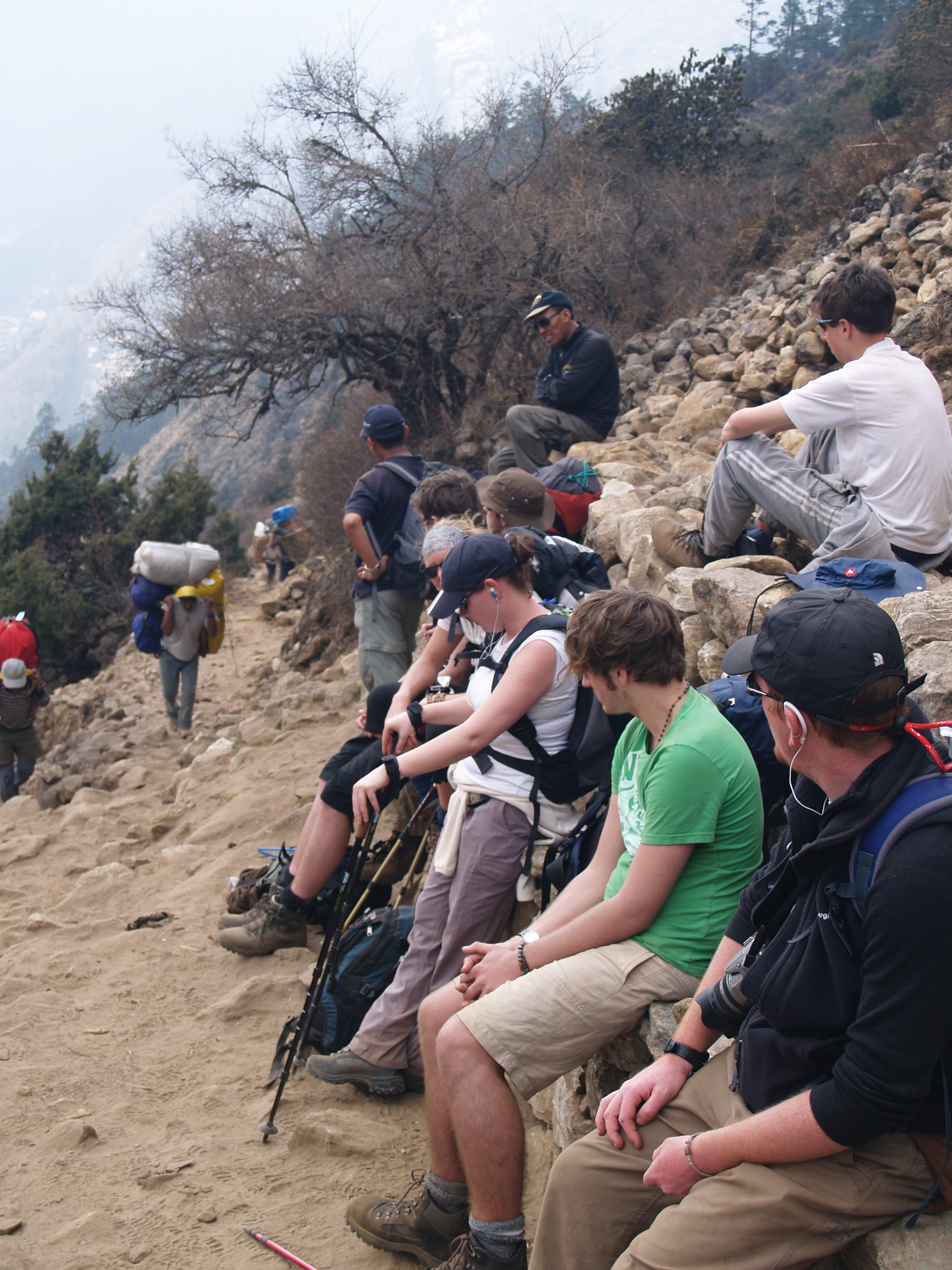
Trekkers in Tengboche

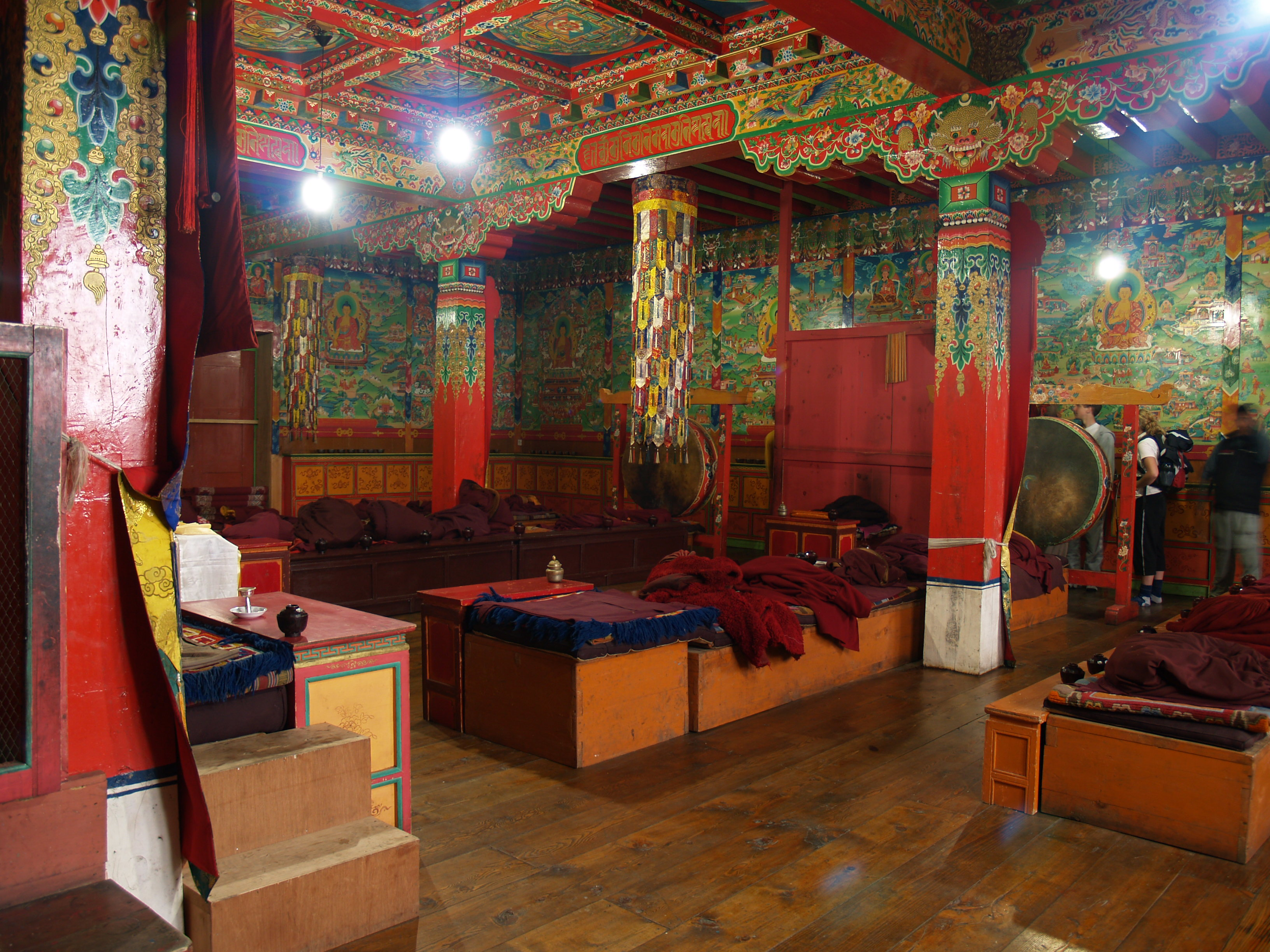
Inside view of the Monastery

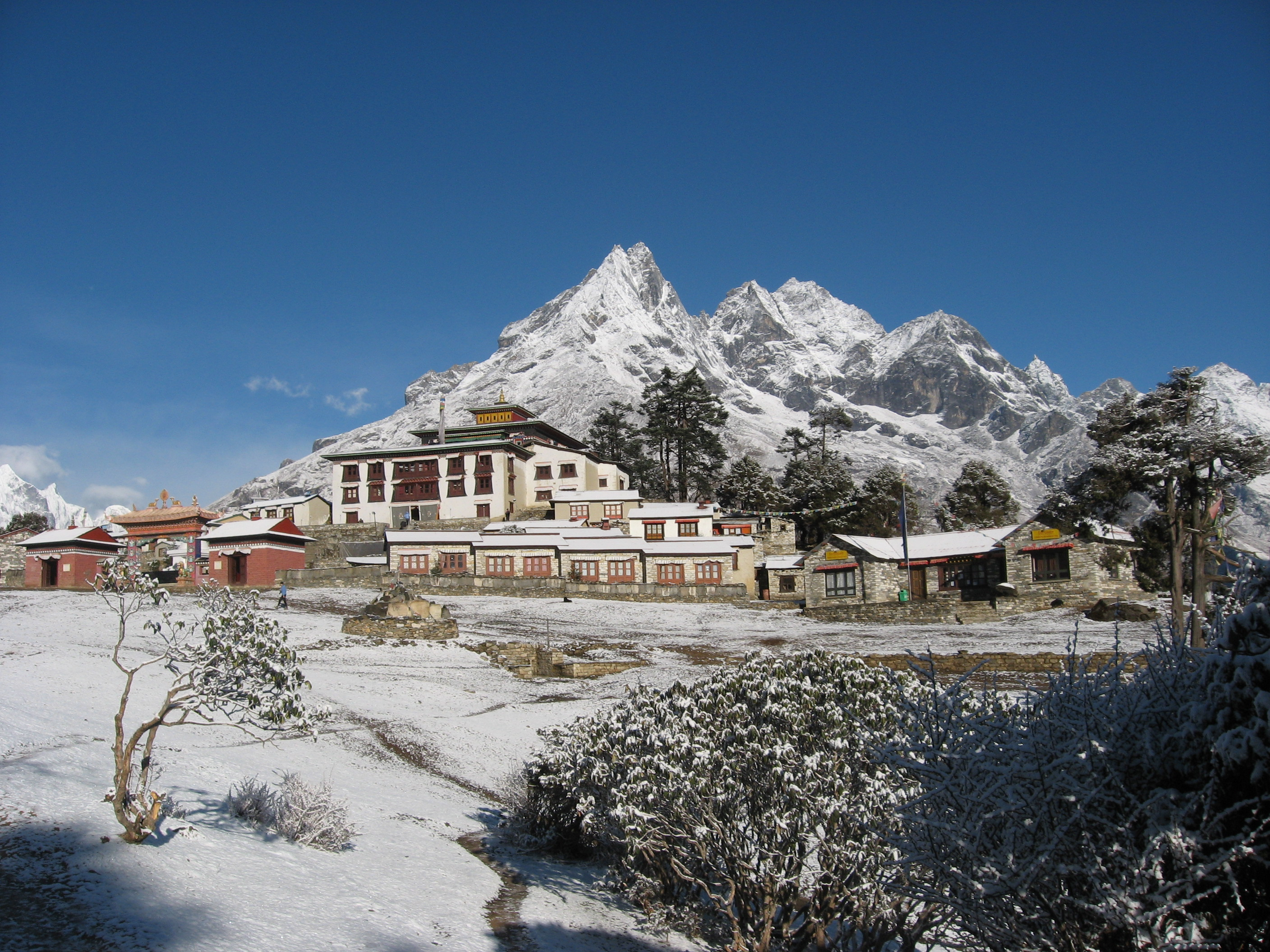
View of monastery from the trail to Pangboche
