= Dughla =

Geographical area in Nepal

Dughla दुघ्ला
- hamlet
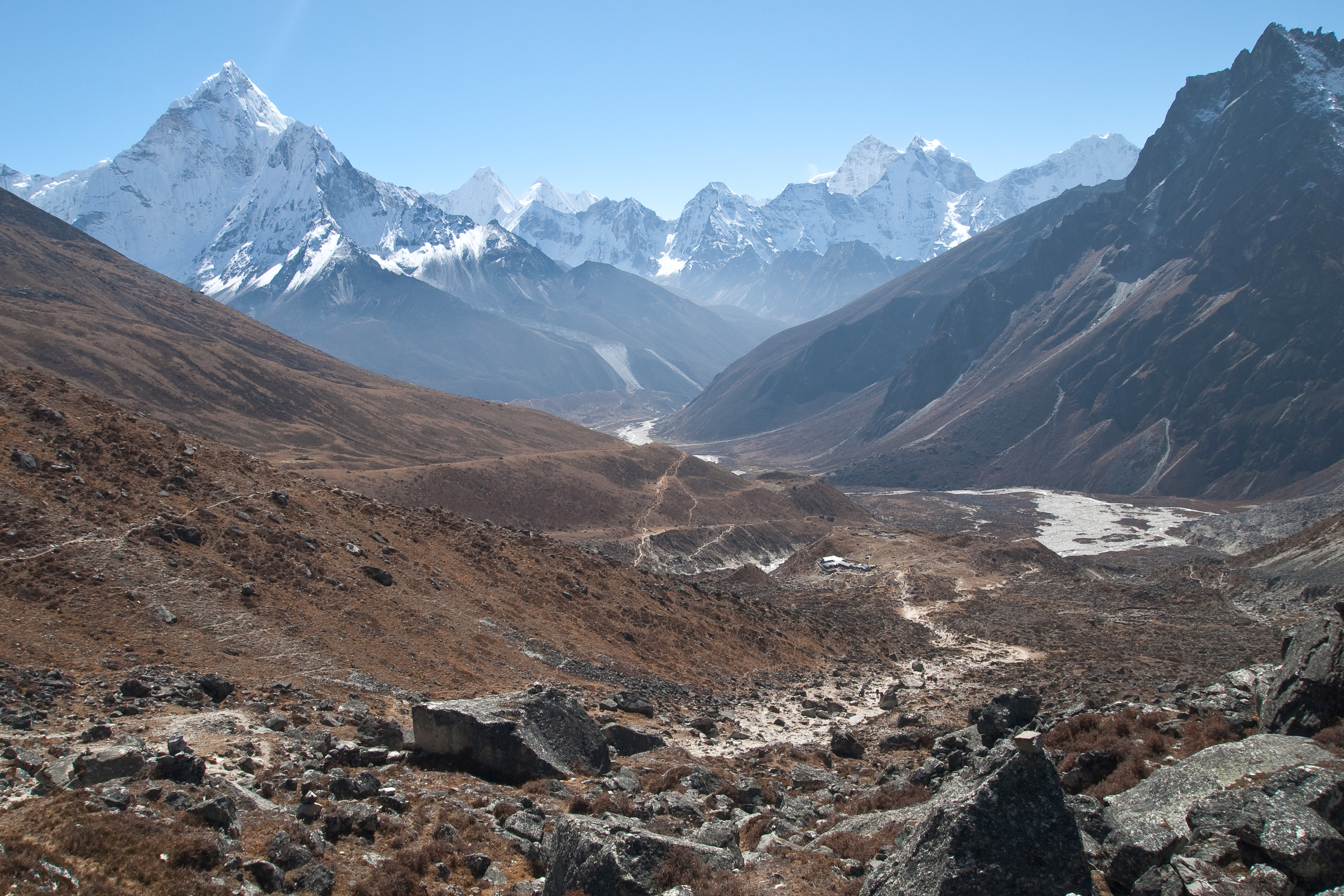
- Interactive map of Dughla
- Location in Nepal
- Coordinates: 27°55′25″N 86°48′20″E
- Country: Nepal
- Zone: Sagarmatha Zone
- District: Solukhumbu District
- VDC: Khumjung
- Elevation: 4,620 m (15,160 ft)
- Time zone: UTC+5:45 (Nepal Time)

Dughla is a small hamlet in Solukhumbu District in the Himalayas of Nepal, to the south of Khumbu Glacier. The settlement, consisting of several huts, is located at an elevation of 4,620 metres (15,160 ft), making it one of the highest settlements in the world, but likely not permanently inhabited all year around as it is essentially a collection of huts catering to hikers. Gokyo to the northwest is a little higher in elevation than Dughla. The village lies in an elevated position above and to the northeast of the lake, obscured from views of the lake by a rocky precipice. There is also a glacial lake Tshola Tsho, and Cho La Pass is nearby.
