= Mani Rimdu =

19-day festival celebrated by Buddhists in the Everest region of Nepal

- Official name: Mani Rimdu
- Observed by: Sherpas
- Type: Ethnic, Cultural
- Significance: To mark the founding of Buddhism by Guru Rinpoche Padmasambhava.
- Date: Starts day after Khojagrat Purnima (15th day of Dashain)
- Frequency: Annual
- First time: Early 1900
- Started by: Sherpas of Tibet

Mani Rimdu is a 19-day festival celebrated by Buddhists in the Everest region of Nepal to mark the founding of Buddhism by Guru Rinpoche Padmasambhava.

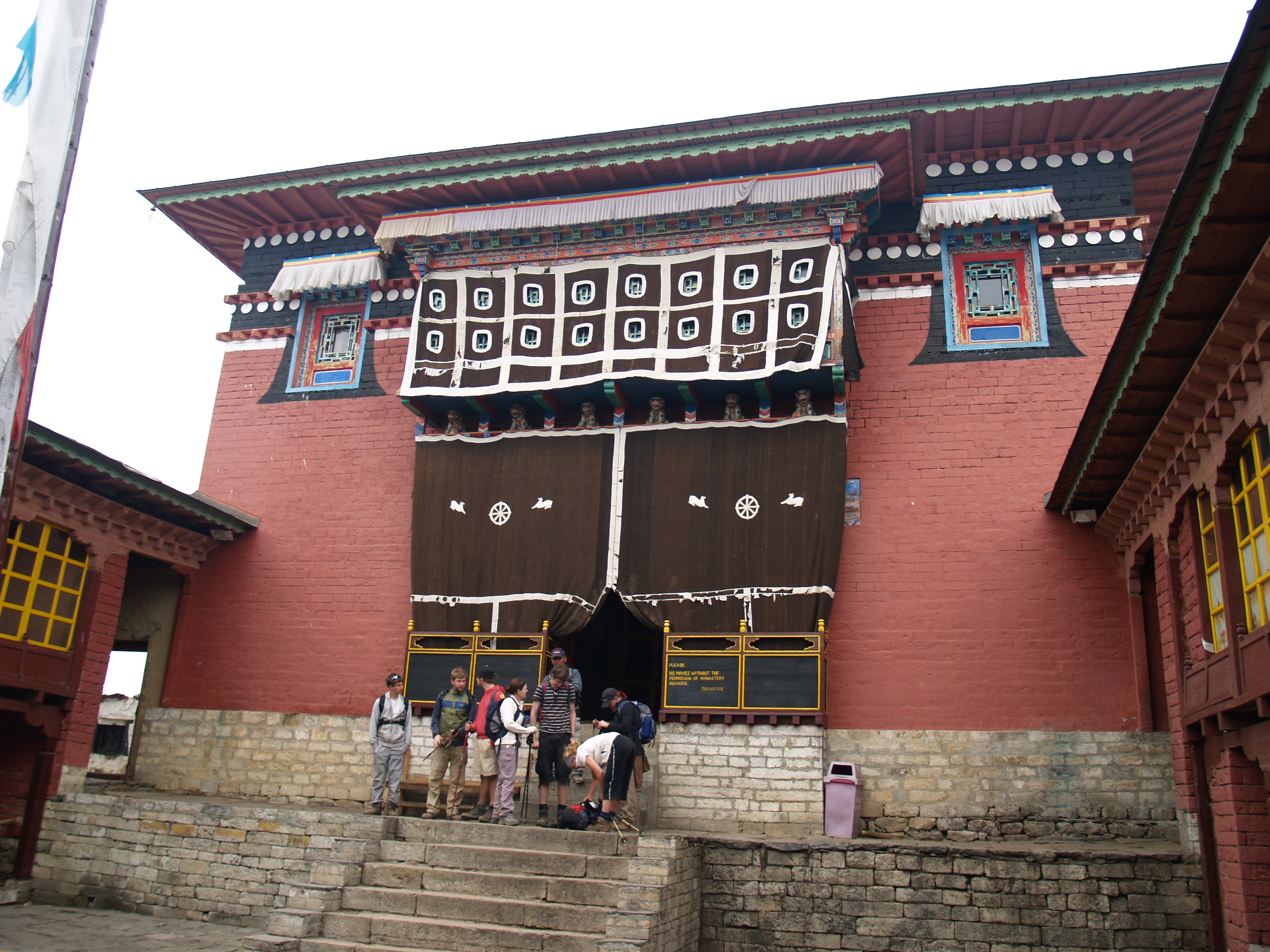
Tengboche Monastery

Magnificent shows are put up on at the monasteries of Tengboche, Thame and Chiwong. The Mani-rimdu festival consists of a series of thirteen acts involving various elements of religious ceremonialism, dance and drama. A huge crowd of Lamas and Sherpa meet at the monastery for the welfare of the world. They enjoy the festival with masked dances, prayers and feasts.

Mani Rimdu is observed from the first day of the tenth month of the Tibetan lunar calendar which falls between October and November under the English calendar.

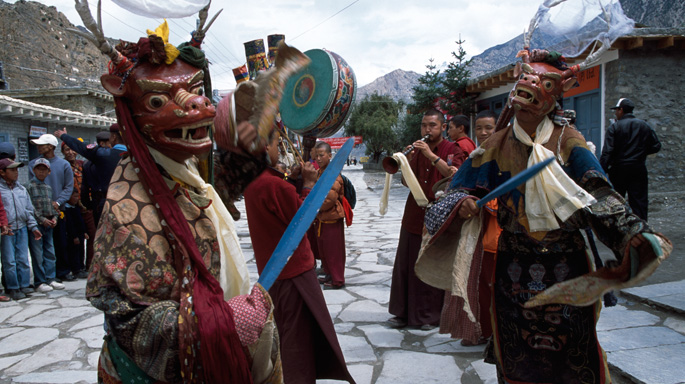
Sherpa's performing dance during Mani Rimdu festival in the Himalaya's of Nepal.

== Origin ==
Mani Rimdu began at Rongpuk Monastery in Tibet in the early 1900s, at the initiative of Ngawang Tenzin Norbu, who had studied in Mindroling Monastery, in Central Tibet. Like much of Rongpuk Monastery practice, most of the rituals that comprise Mani Rimdu find their source at Mindroling Monastery, the great Nyingma monastery in Central Tibet.

== Development ==
In the 1980s-1990s, Richard J. Kohn worked on university research focused on the Mani Rimdu. The Mani Rimdu festival is performed in the Sherpa and Tibetan monasteries of Solu Khumbu District in the Everest region of Nepal: Chiwong, Thami, Tengboche Monastery. Nowadays, Mani Rimdu is the biggest event of the year for the Sherpas of the Khumbu region.

== Rinpoche's Reincarnation ==
The high lama head of the Sakya order of Tibetan Buddhism, will get information about the successor Rinpoche. After he gives a name, monks must form groups and look for the chosen family.

The reincarnated Rinpoche will next have to pass a test, which will include recalling events from the prior Tengboche Rinpoche's life. Following passing the exam, he will be dispatched to various monasteries for instruction, after which the Rinpoche's post at Tengboche would be reclaimed.

== Mani Rimdu 2022 ==
The Tibetan Lunar calendar is used to determine the Mani Rimdu festival's date. The Mani Rimdu is performed in Tengboche during the ninth Tibetan month, which usually coincides with the full moon in October or November. The Mani Rimdu Festival will be held in 2022 on the 8th, 9th, and 10 November.
