= Chharchung =

Former Village Development Committee in Nepal

Chharchung छर्चुङ
- Village
- Location in Nepal
- Coordinates: 27°55′26″N 86°43′24″E
- Country: Nepal
- Zone: Sagarmatha Zone
- District: Solukhumbu District
- VDC: Khumjung
- Time zone: UTC+5:45 (Nepal Time)

Chharchung is a small village in Solukhumbu District in the Himalayas of Nepal. It lies to the southeast of the Gokyo Lakes and Gokyo village and north of Khumjung. The village is located at an altitude of 4,502 metres (14,770 ft), making it one of the highest settlements in Nepal and in the world. The village is best viewed on Google Earth at 27°55′26″N 86°43′24″E which reveals areas under cultivation, suggesting a permanent settlement. It is not a known village along the hiking route to Gokyo, lying across the valley.
