= Pangboche =

Pangboche पाङ्बोचे
- Village
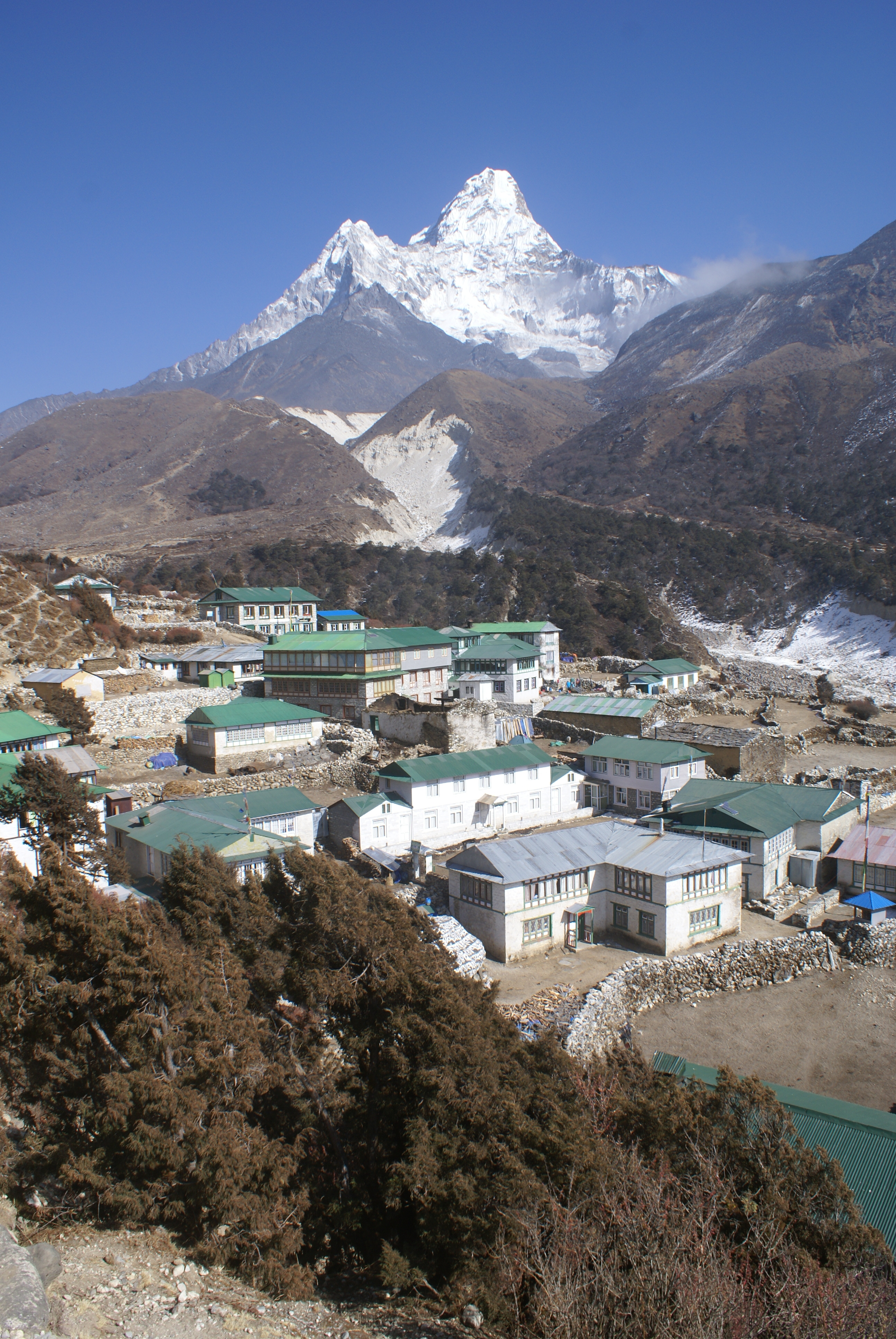
- Pangboche with Ama Dablam mountain behind

- Location in Nepal
- Coordinates: 27°51′N 86°48′E
- Country: Nepal
- Province: Province No. 1
- Zone: Sagarmatha Zone
- District: Solukhumbu District
- Area: Khumjung
- Elevation: 3,985 m (13,074 ft)
- Time zone: UTC+5:45 (NST)

Pangboche or Panboche is a village in Khumjung Village Development Committee of Solukhumbu District in Province No. 1 of Nepal at an altitude of 13,074 feet (3,985 m). It is located high in the Himalayas in the Imja Khole valley, about 3 kilometres northeast of Tengboche and is a base camp for climbing the nearby Ama Dablam and trekking. It contains a monastery, famed for its purported yeti scalp and hand, the latter of which was stolen. The village is inhabited mainly by Sherpas, and Sungdare Sherpa, a native of the village, held the record for summiting Everest five times in the Sherpa climbing history and in the world history of mountaineering in 1989. The Pangboche school was built by Sir Edmund Hillary's Himalayan Trust in 1963. North of the village is the Dughla lake and pass.

== See also ==
- Solukhumbu District
- Province No. 1
- Nepal
- Khumjung
- Pangboche Hand
