= Gokyo =

Village in Nepal

Gokyo गोक्यो
- Village
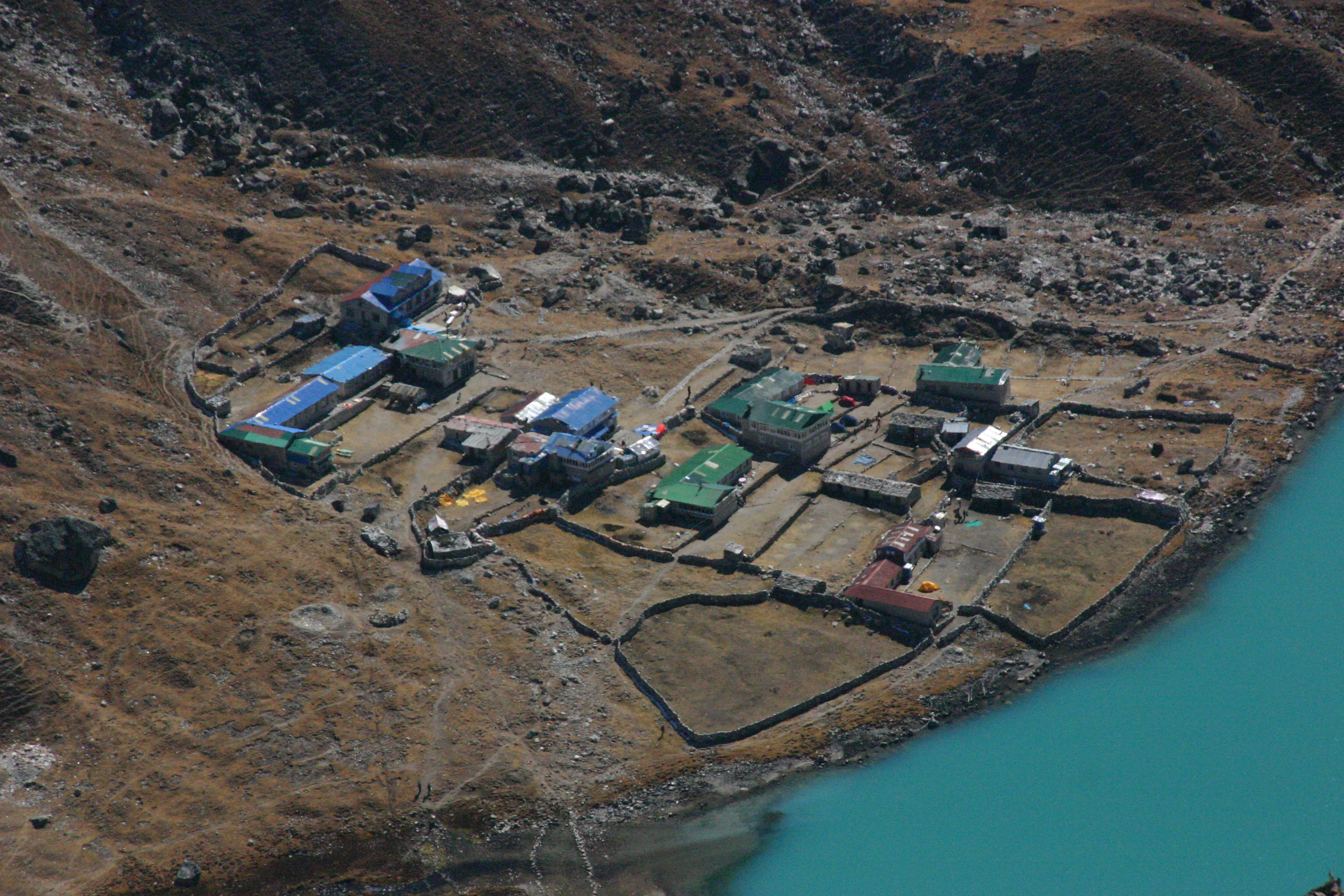
- Gokyo

- Location in Nepal
- Coordinates: 27°57′16″N 86°41′43″E
- Country: Nepal
- Zone: Sagarmatha Zone
- District: Solukhumbu District
- VDC: Khumjung
- Elevation: 4,750 m (15,580 ft)
- Time zone: UTC+5:45 (Nepal Time)

Gokyo is a small village in Solukhumbu District in the Himalayas of Nepal, at the foot of Gokyo Ri, located on the eastern shore of the third Gokyo Lake, Dudh Pokhari. To the southeast is the village of Chharchung. Gokyo is best viewed on Google Earth at 27°57′16″N 86°41′43″E.

Located at an elevation of 4,750 m (15,584 ft), the village is one of the highest settlements in Nepal and in the world. Almost all the buildings are guest houses for trekkers. The people who live in the village leave during the winter and move to other (lower) villages, or Kathmandu.

In 1995, an avalanche killed 42 people, including 17 foreign nationals (13 Japanese, two Canadians, one Irish woman and a German). A cyclone in the Bay of Bengal had resulted in 6 ft (1.8 m) of snow being dumped into the mountains during the previous week, significantly increasing the avalanche hazard.

Gokyo

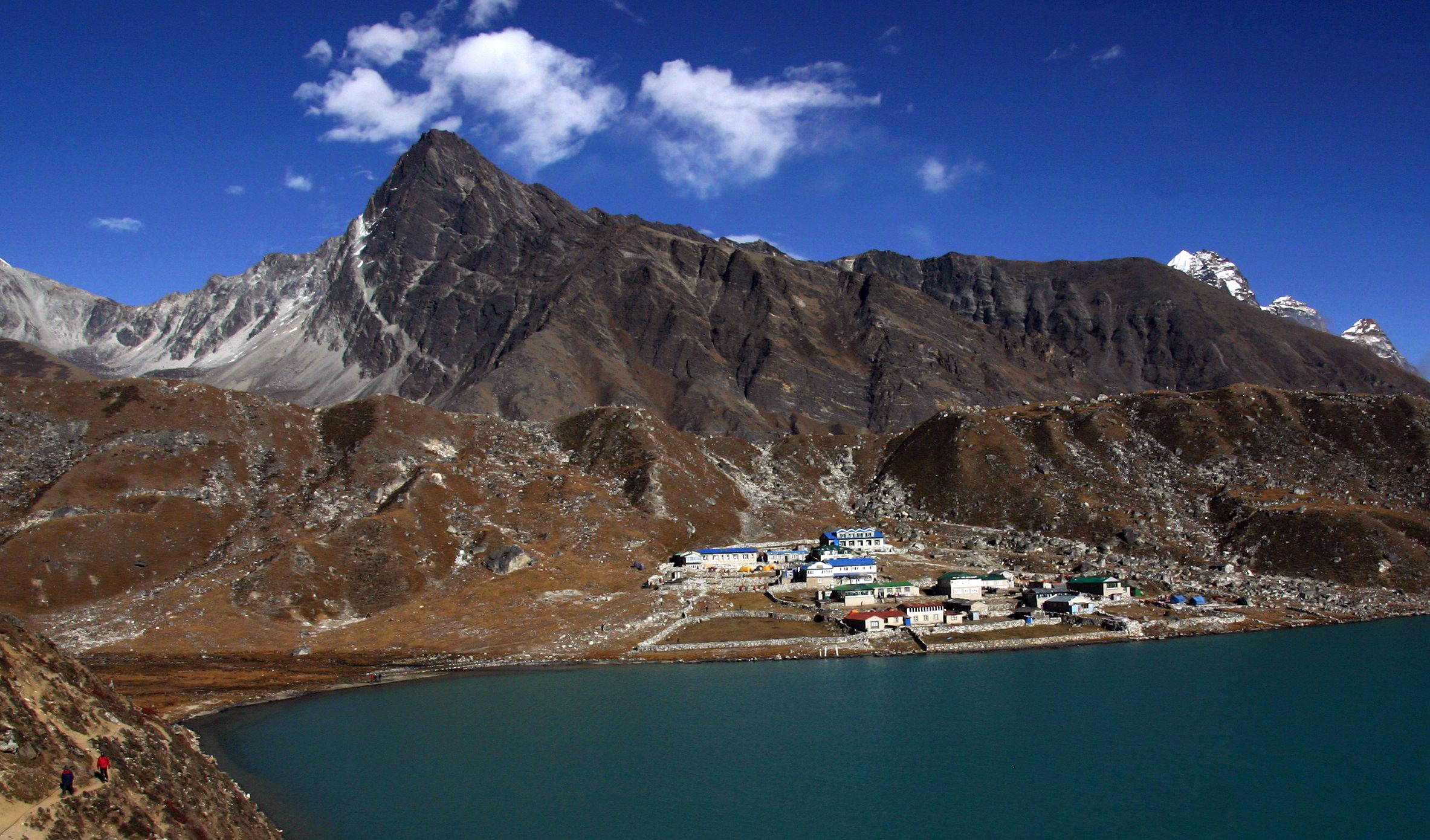

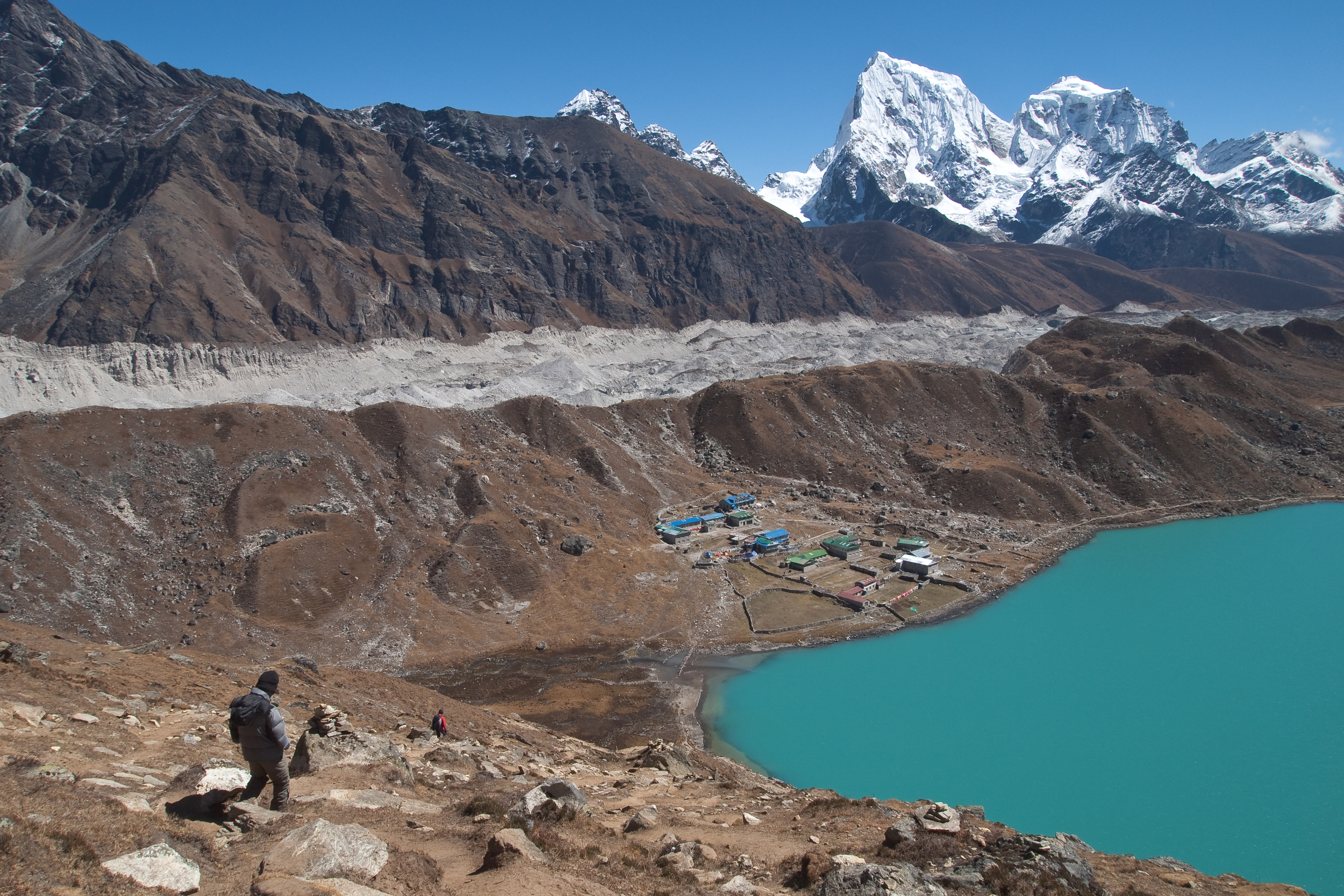

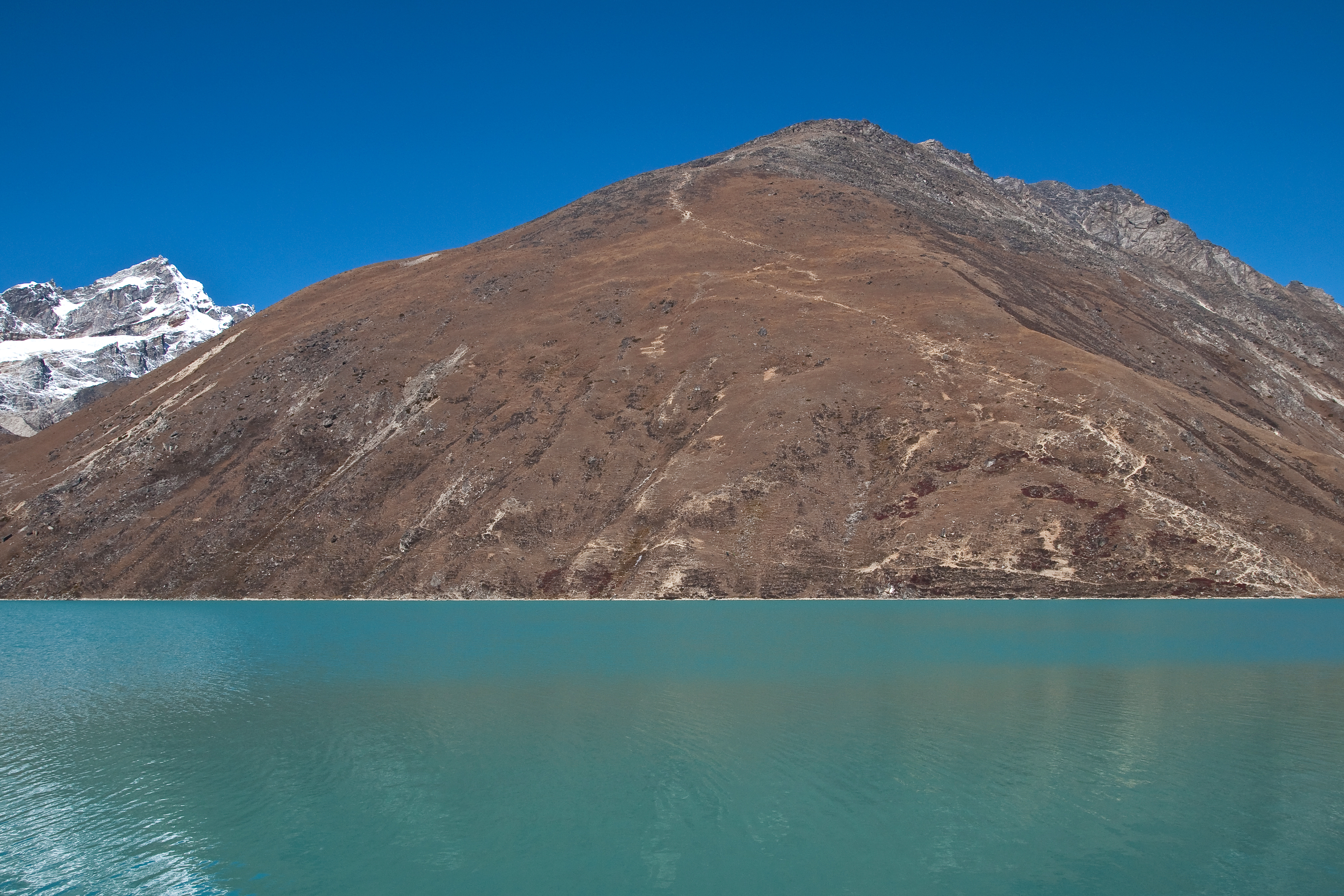

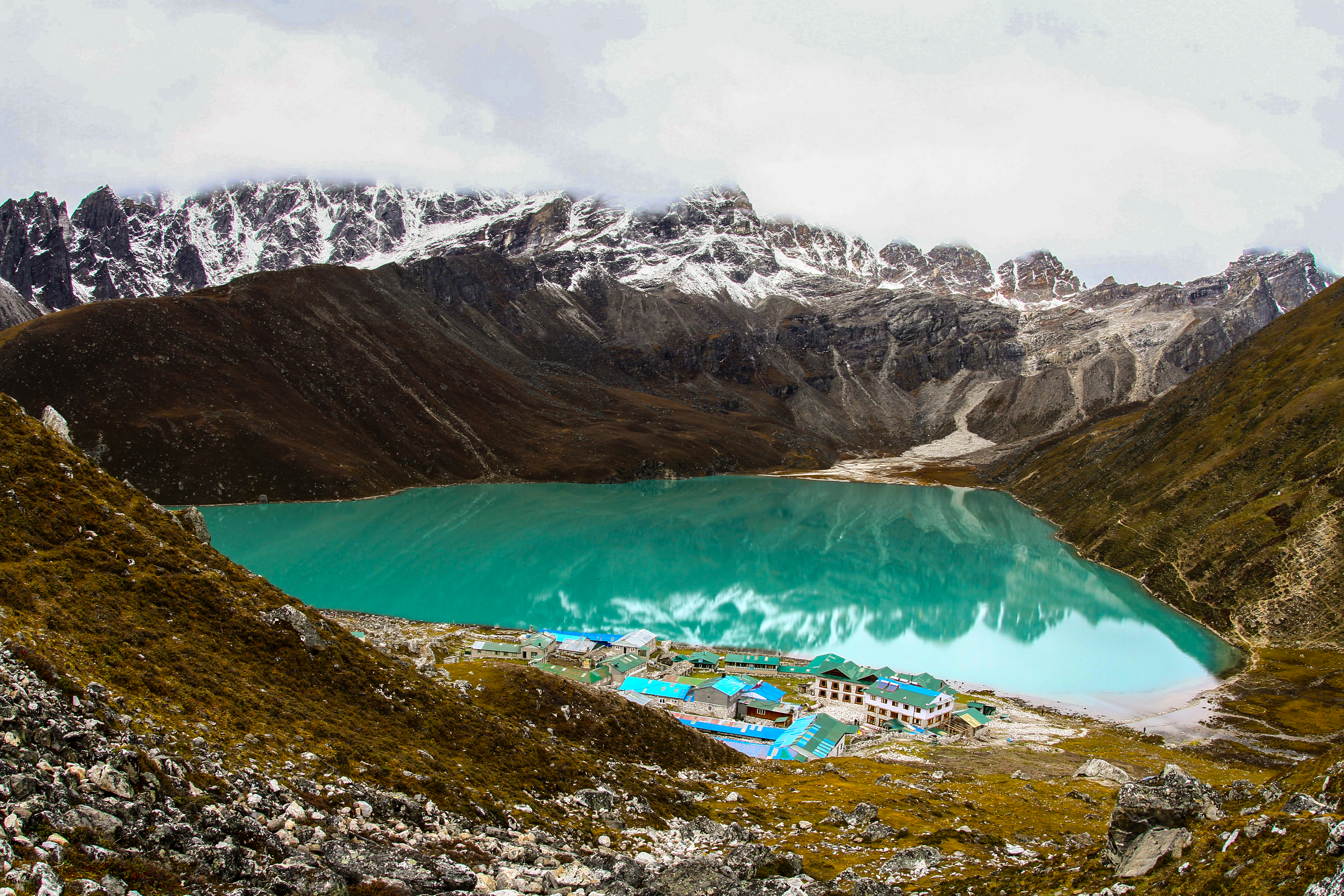
Gokyo Lake and Village as seen from the Glaciel side of the place.
