= Khumjung =

Former Village Development Committee in Nepal

Khumjung खुम्जुङ
- Neighborhood
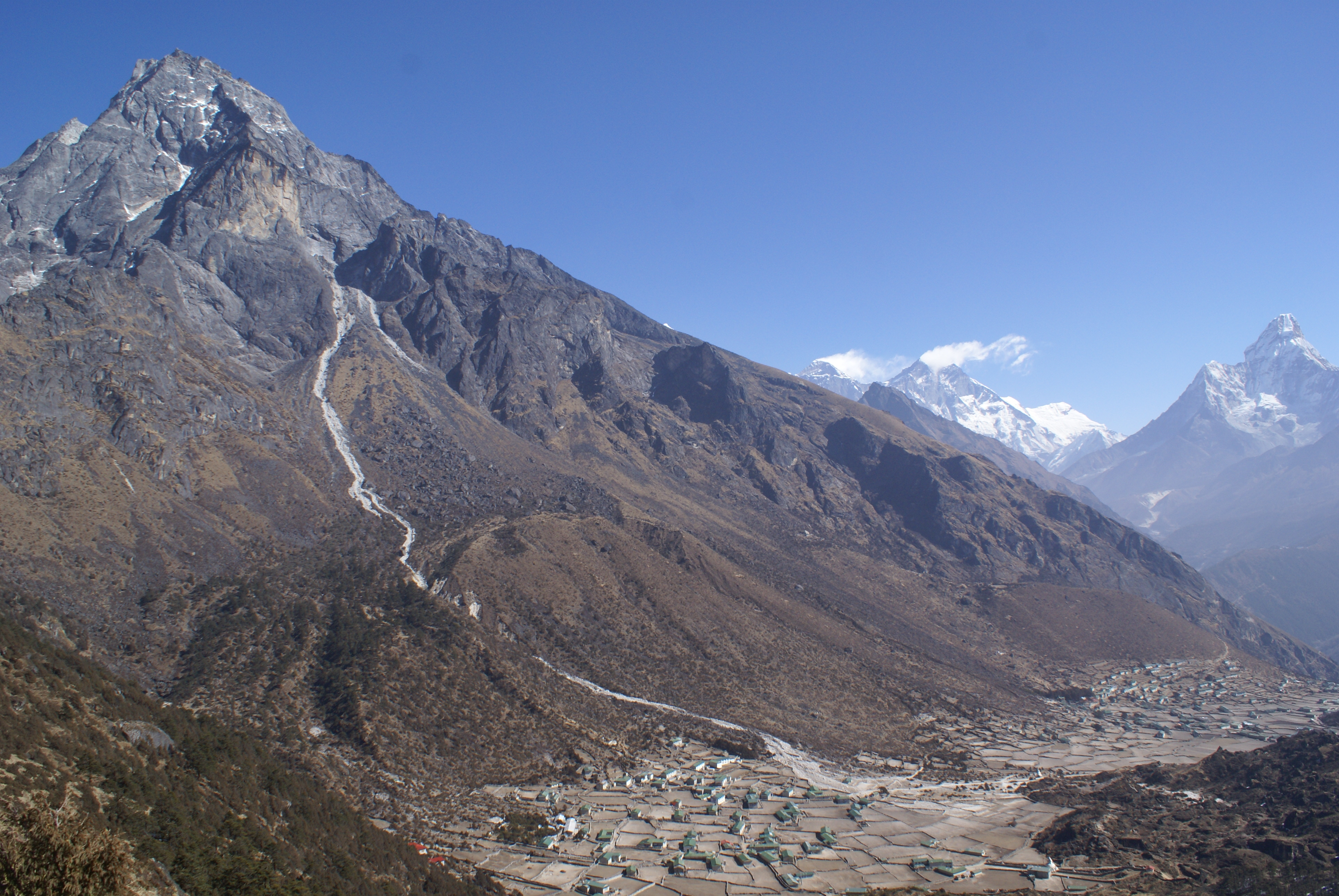
- The mountain Khumbila above the villages Khumjung and Kunde. In the background you can see Mount Everest, Lhotse and Ama Dablam

- Location in Province Khumjung (Nepal)
- Coordinates: 27°49′N 86°43′E
- Country: Nepal
- Province: Province No. 1
- District: Solukhumbu
- Rural Municipality: Khumbu Pasanglhamu
- Located at: ward no. 4
- Elevation: 3,790 m (12,430 ft)

Population (2011)
  - Total: 1,912
- Time zone: UTC+5:45 (Nepal Time)
- Area code: 038

Khumjung (Nepali: खुम्जुंग) is a village in Khumbu Pasanglhamu rural municipality of Solukhumbu District in Province No. 1 of north-eastern Nepal. It is located in the Khumbu sub-region inside Sagarmatha National Park, a world heritage site. The village lies at an elevation of 3,790 metres above sea level, near Mount Khumbila.

A monastery in Khumjung has a purported Yeti scalp. This village has modern communications such as the Internet and mobile and landline phones.

The village is the seat of ward no. 4, which include Kunde, Khumjung, Tengboche (Tyangboche), Pangboche, Pheriche, Dole, Chharchung, Machhermo, Lobuche, Dingboche, and Gokyo. As of 2011, it had a population of 1,912 people living in 551 individual households.

Khumjung school was built by Sir Edmund Hillary's Himalayan Trust in 1961. The school began with two classrooms but now caters to pre-school, primary and secondary sections with over 350 students.

== History ==
Khumjung was a separate Village development committee in Solukhumbu District of Sagarmatha Zone of EDR in Nepal during Kingdom of Nepal. With new administrative structure on 10 March 2017, it became part of Khumbu Pasanglhamu rural municipality.

== Climate ==
Climate data for Khumjung (Syangboche Airport), elevation 3,700 m (12,100 ft)
| Month | Jan | Feb | Mar | Apr | May | Jun | Jul | Aug | Sep | Oct | Nov | Dec | Year |
|---|---|---|---|---|---|---|---|---|---|---|---|---|---|
| Mean daily maximum °C (°F) | 3.9 (39.0) | 4.5 (40.1) | 8.1 (46.6) | 11.3 (52.3) | 12.8 (55.0) | 13.8 (56.8) | 13.8 (56.8) | 14.1 (57.4) | 12.8 (55.0) | 11.3 (52.3) | 7.8 (46.0) | 5.6 (42.1) | 10.0 (49.9) |
| Daily mean °C (°F) | −1.8 (28.8) | −0.7 (30.7) | 2.5 (36.5) | 5.1 (41.2) | 7.3 (45.1) | 9.6 (49.3) | 10.1 (50.2) | 10.1 (50.2) | 8.8 (47.8) | 6.0 (42.8) | 2.0 (35.6) | −0.2 (31.6) | 4.9 (40.8) |
| Mean daily minimum °C (°F) | −7.5 (18.5) | −6.0 (21.2) | −3.0 (26.6) | −0.9 (30.4) | 1.7 (35.1) | 5.4 (41.7) | 6.5 (43.7) | 6.0 (42.8) | 4.8 (40.6) | 0.8 (33.4) | −3.8 (25.2) | −6.0 (21.2) | −0.2 (31.7) |
| Average precipitation mm (inches) | 24.1 (0.95) | 14.3 (0.56) | 30.5 (1.20) | 28.0 (1.10) | 38.9 (1.53) | 172.5 (6.79) | 299.4 (11.79) | 290.0 (11.42) | 193.8 (7.63) | 85.9 (3.38) | 0.6 (0.02) | 0.0 (0.0) | 1,178 (46.37) |
Source 1: FAO
Source 2: Australian National University

== Galleries ==
Khumjung village

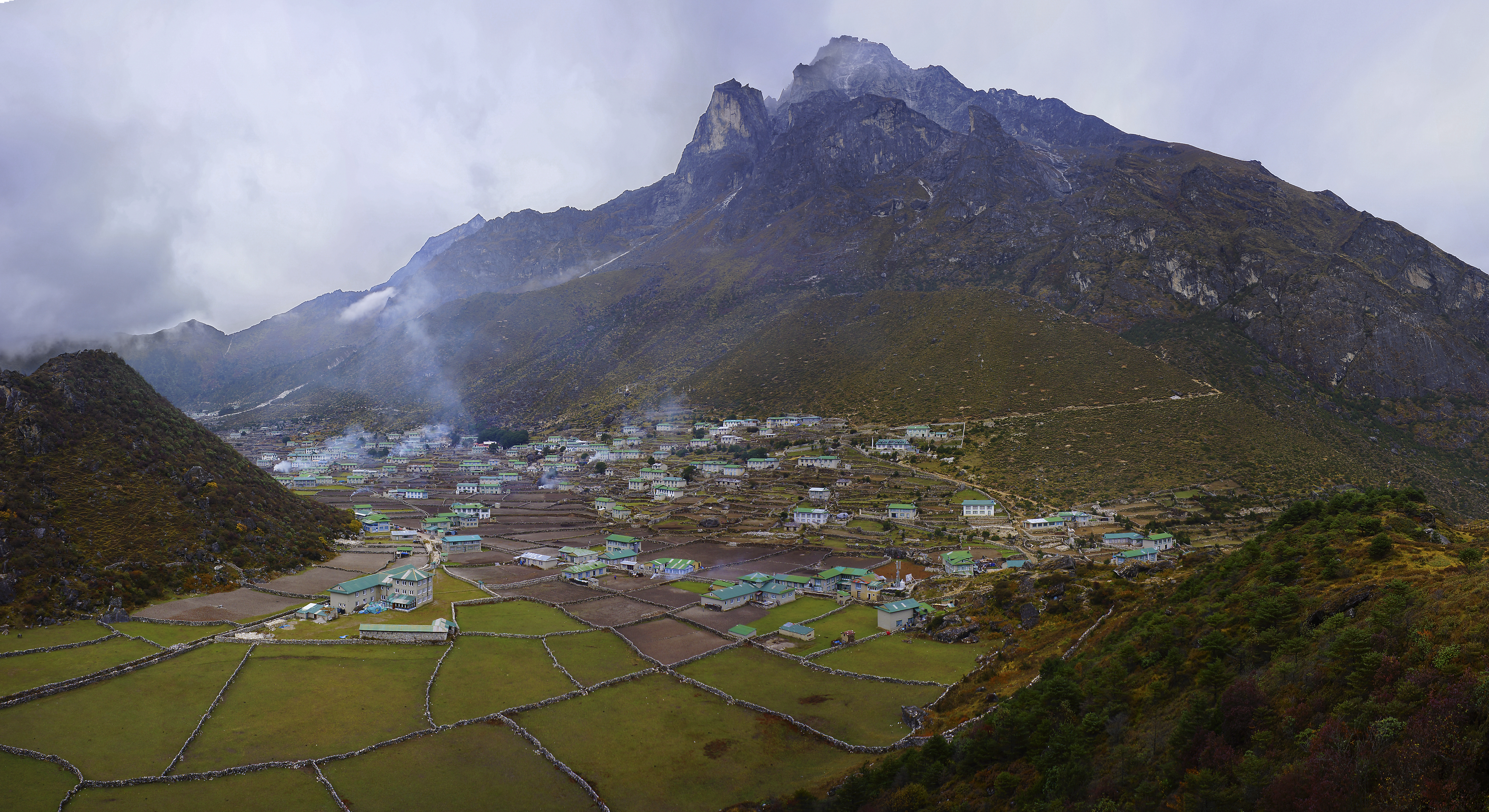
Khumjung village and Mount Khumbila

S side of Khumjung kani

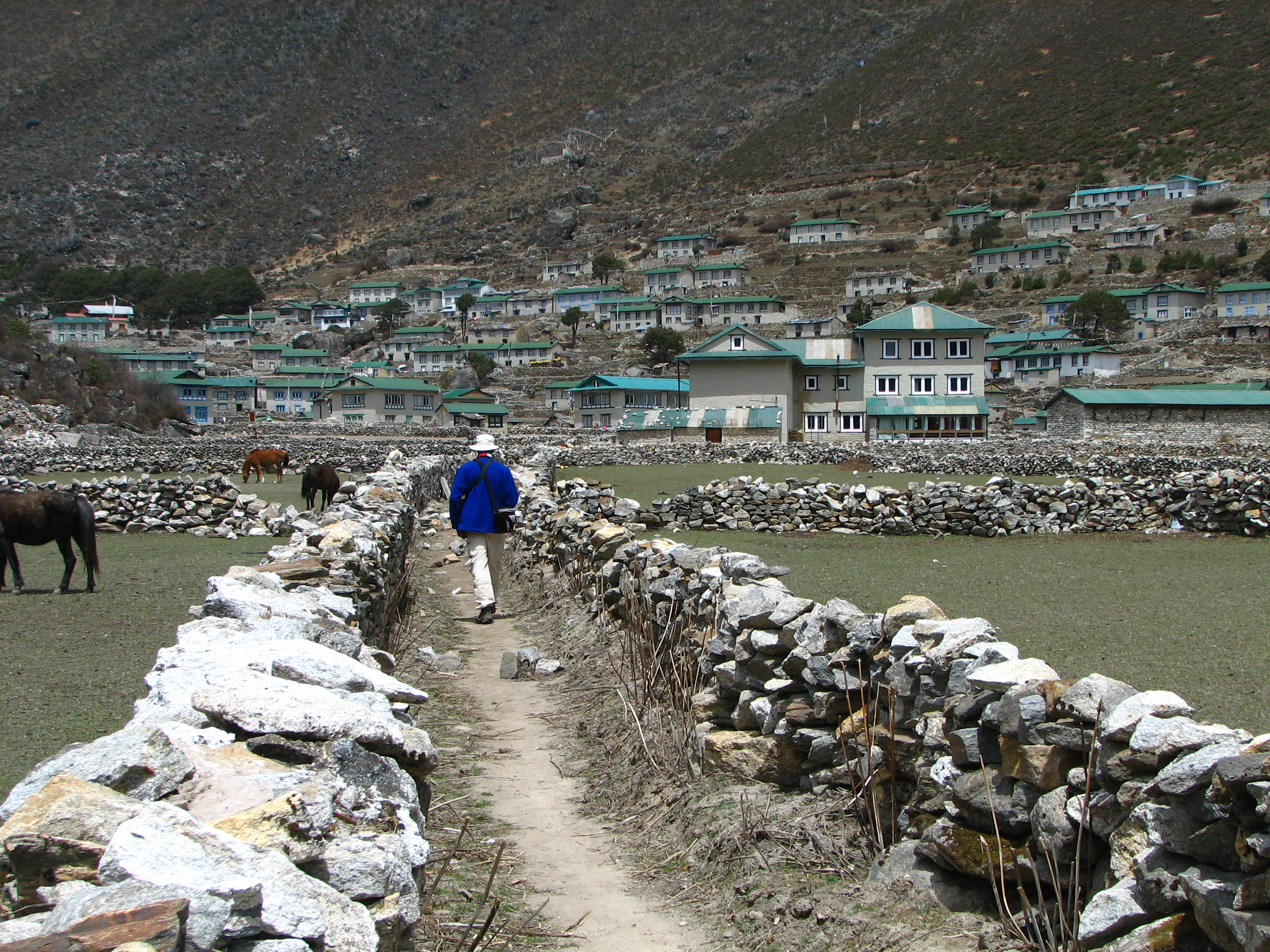
Khumjung village

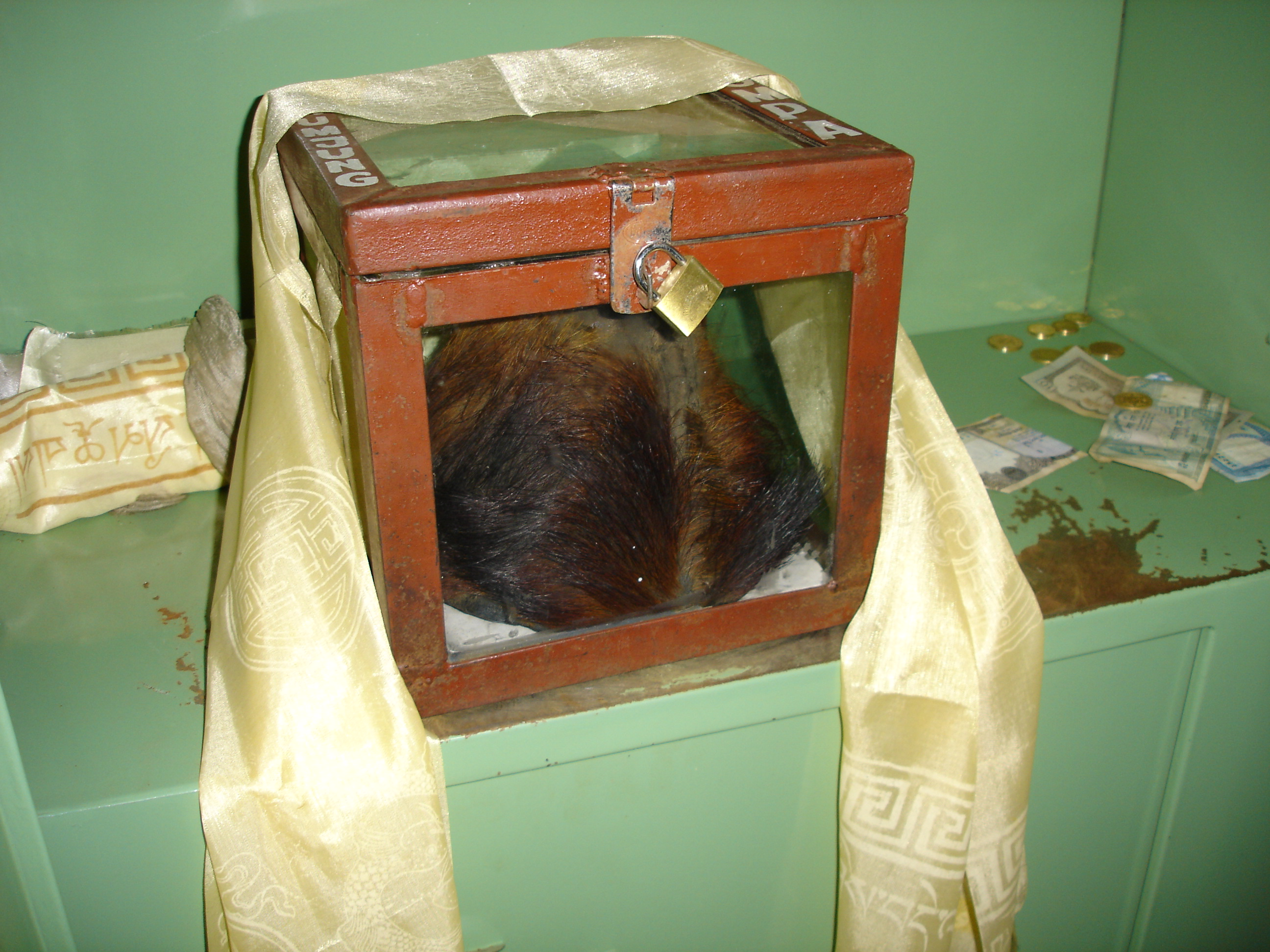
Purported Yeti scalp at Khumjung monastery

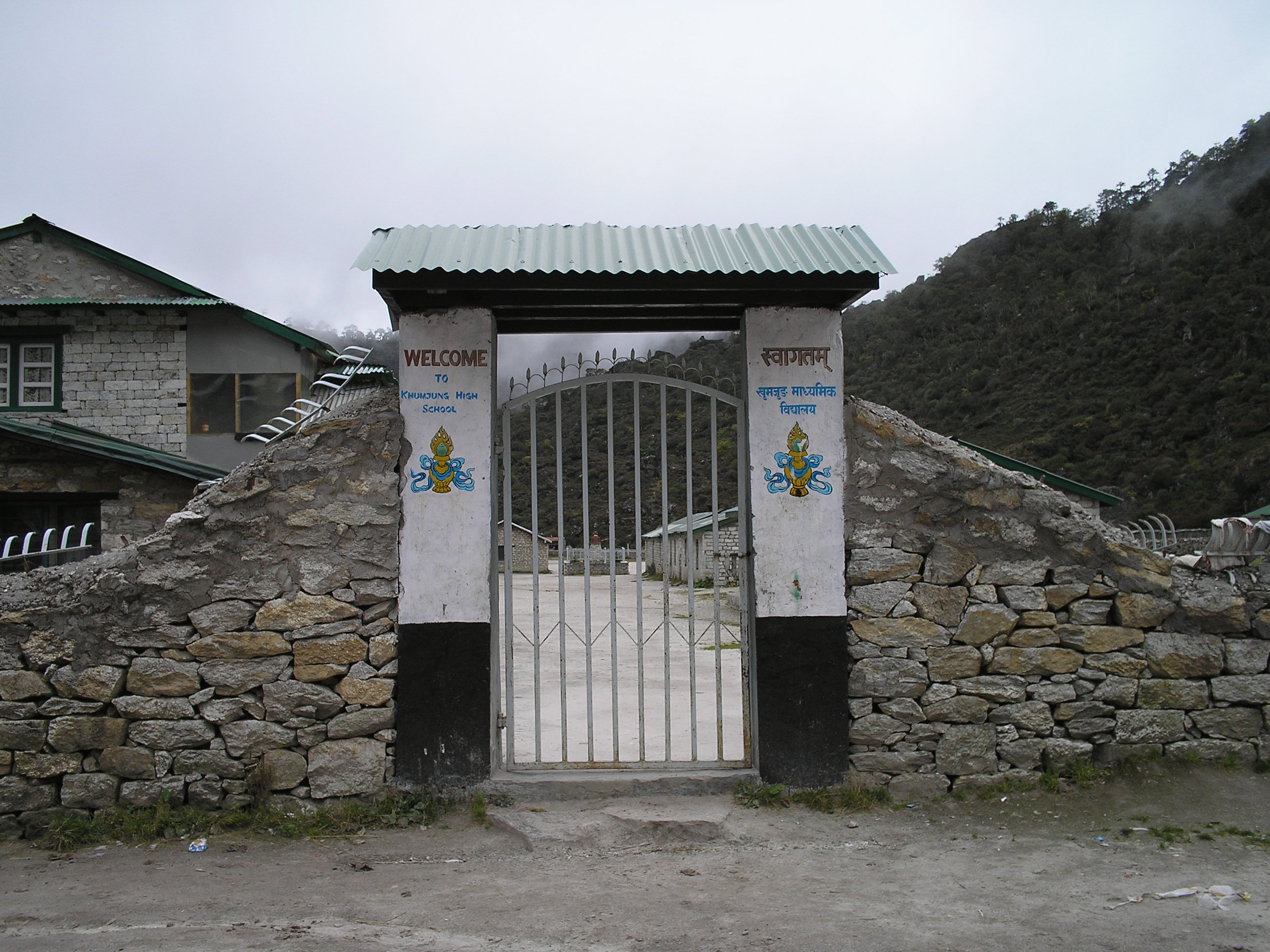
Khumjung high school entrance

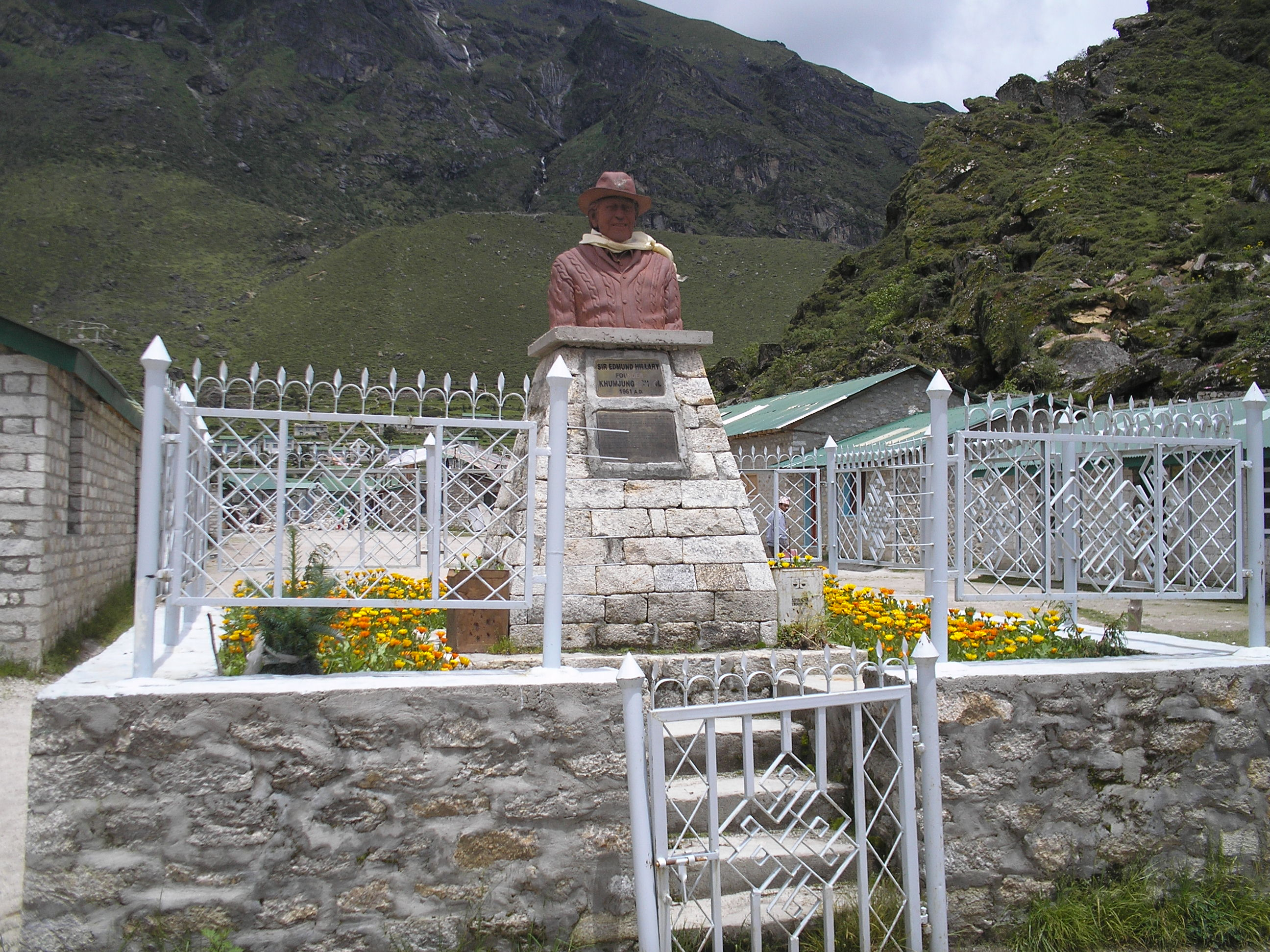
Bust of Edmung Hillary at Khumjung School

VDC Khumjung - Villages and hamlets

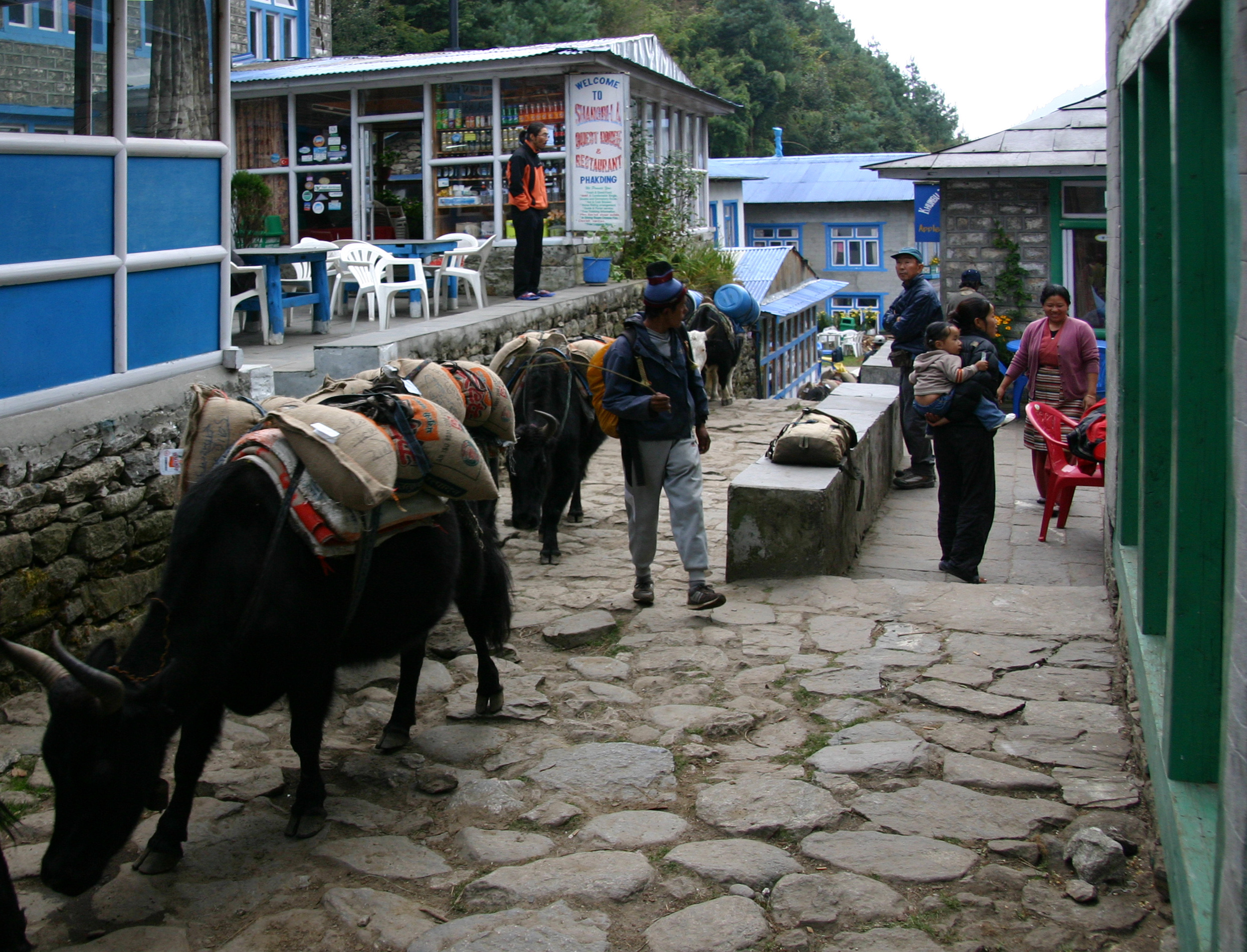
Phakding

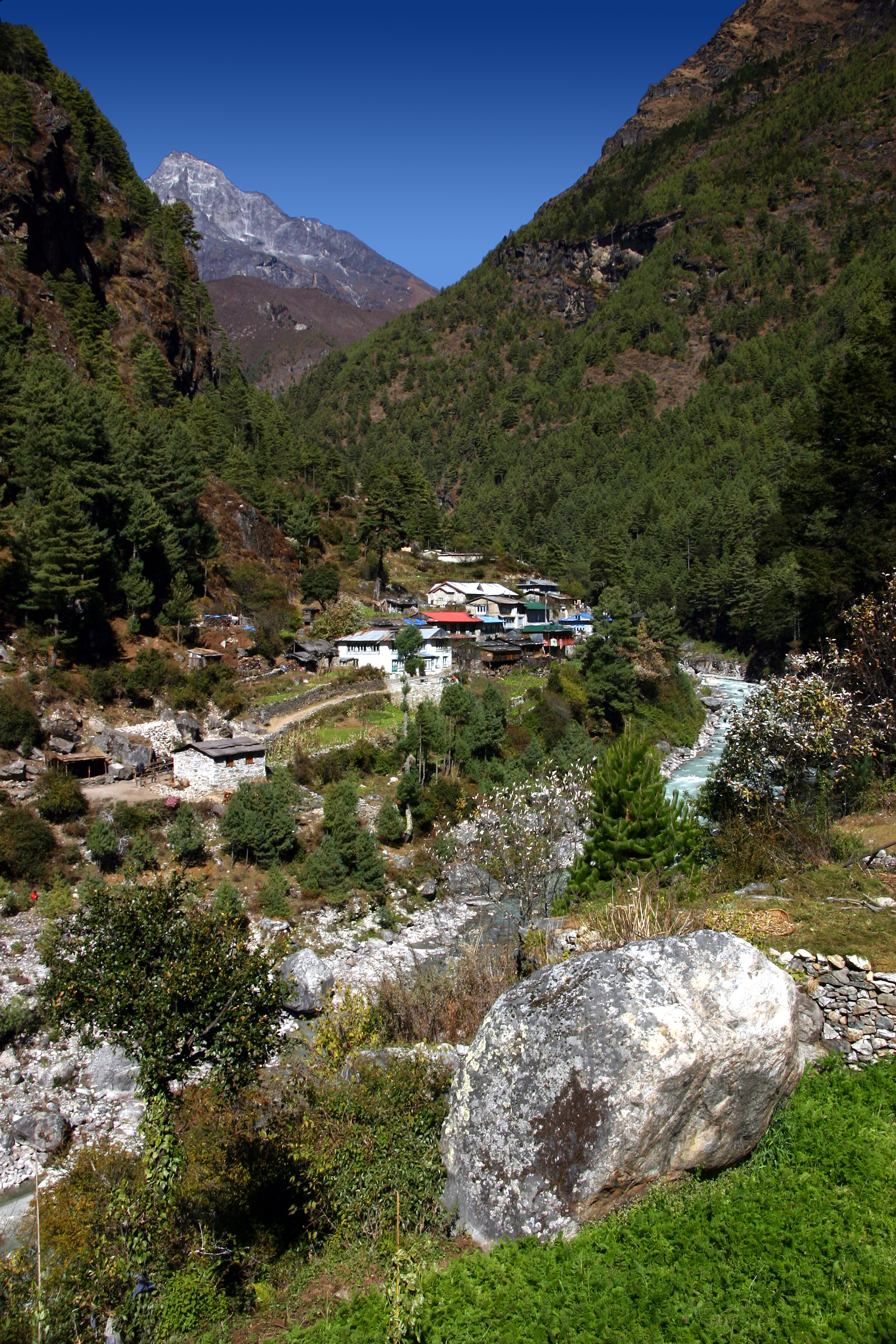
Jorsale

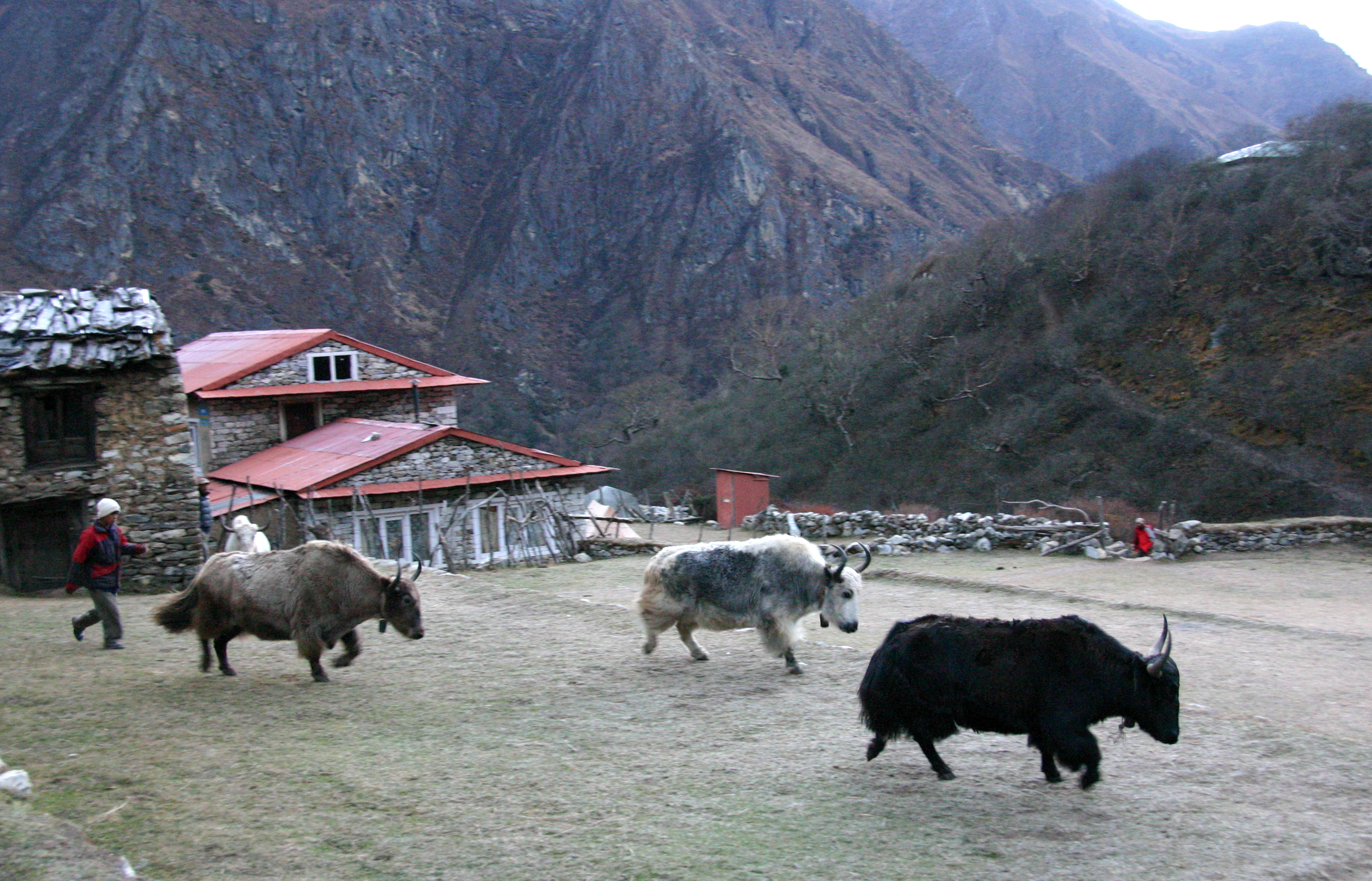
Dhole

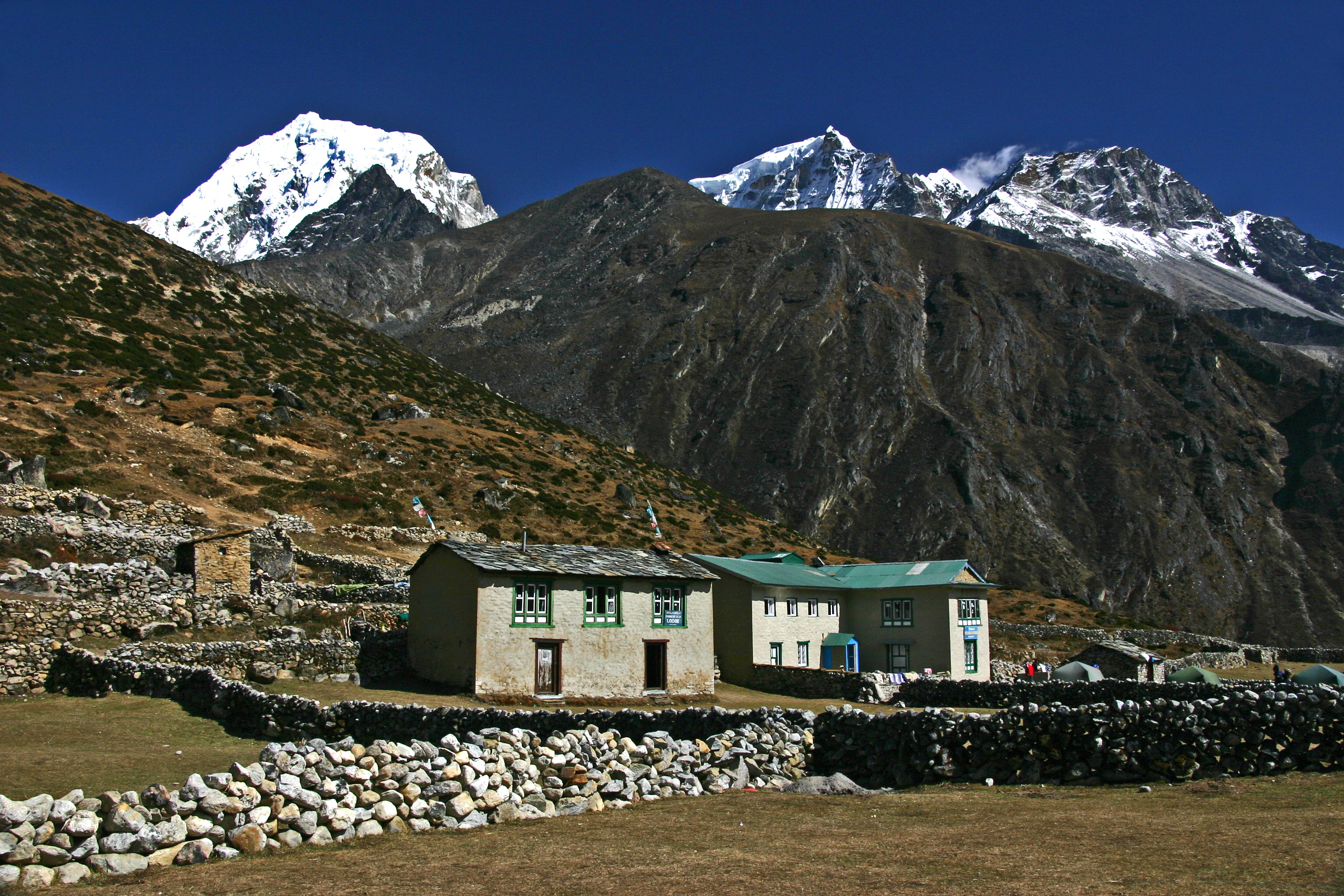
Machhermo

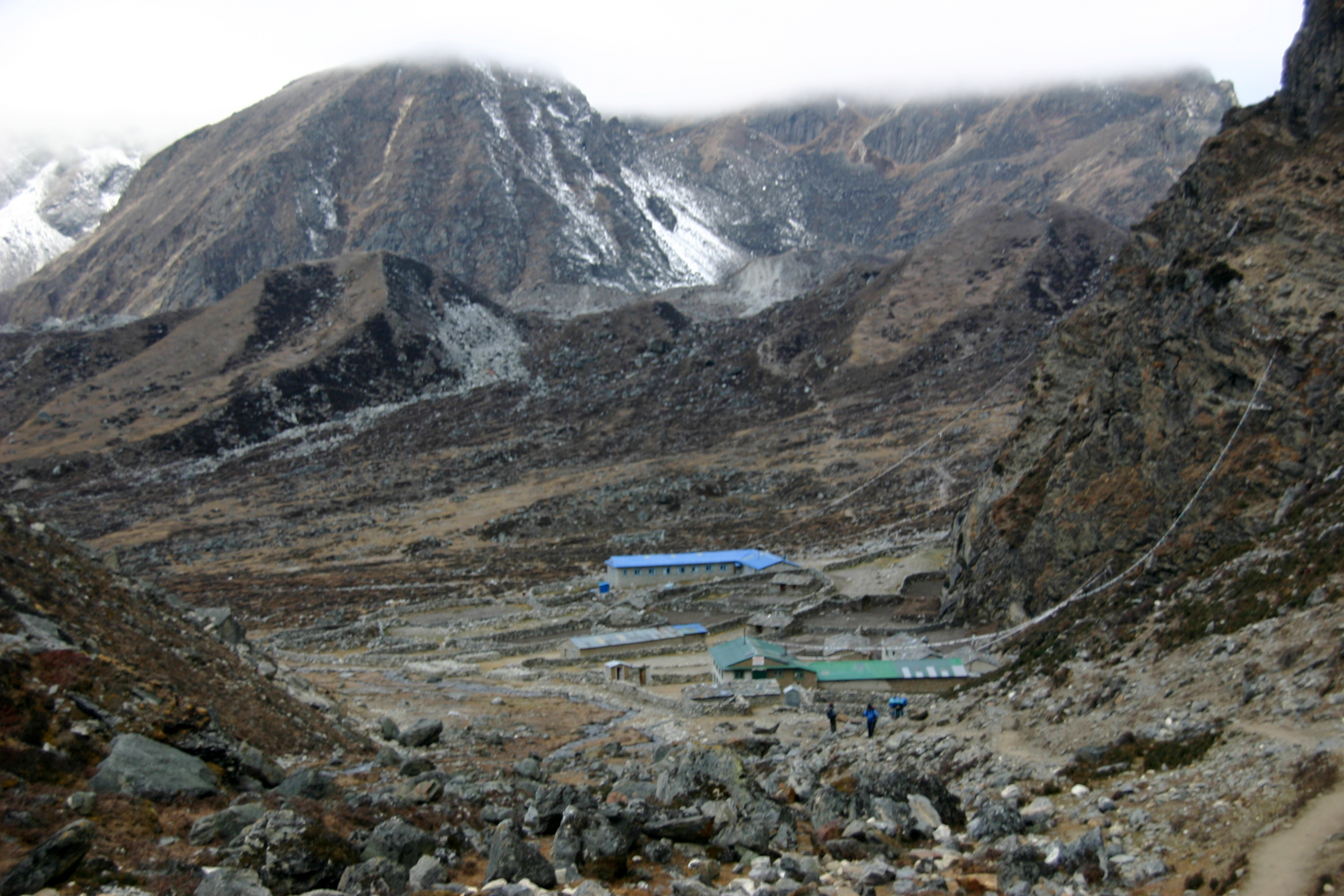
Thangna

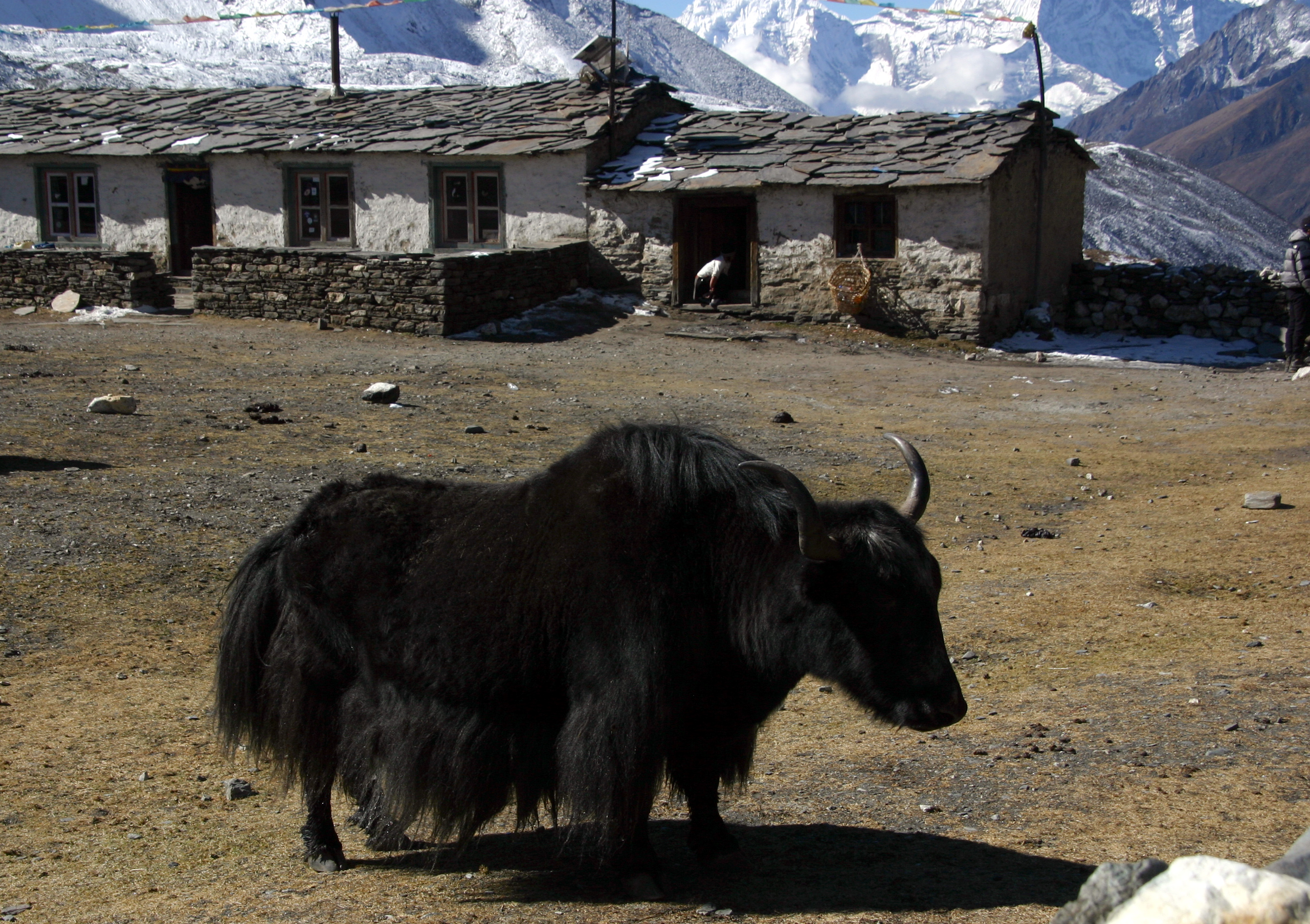
Chhukung

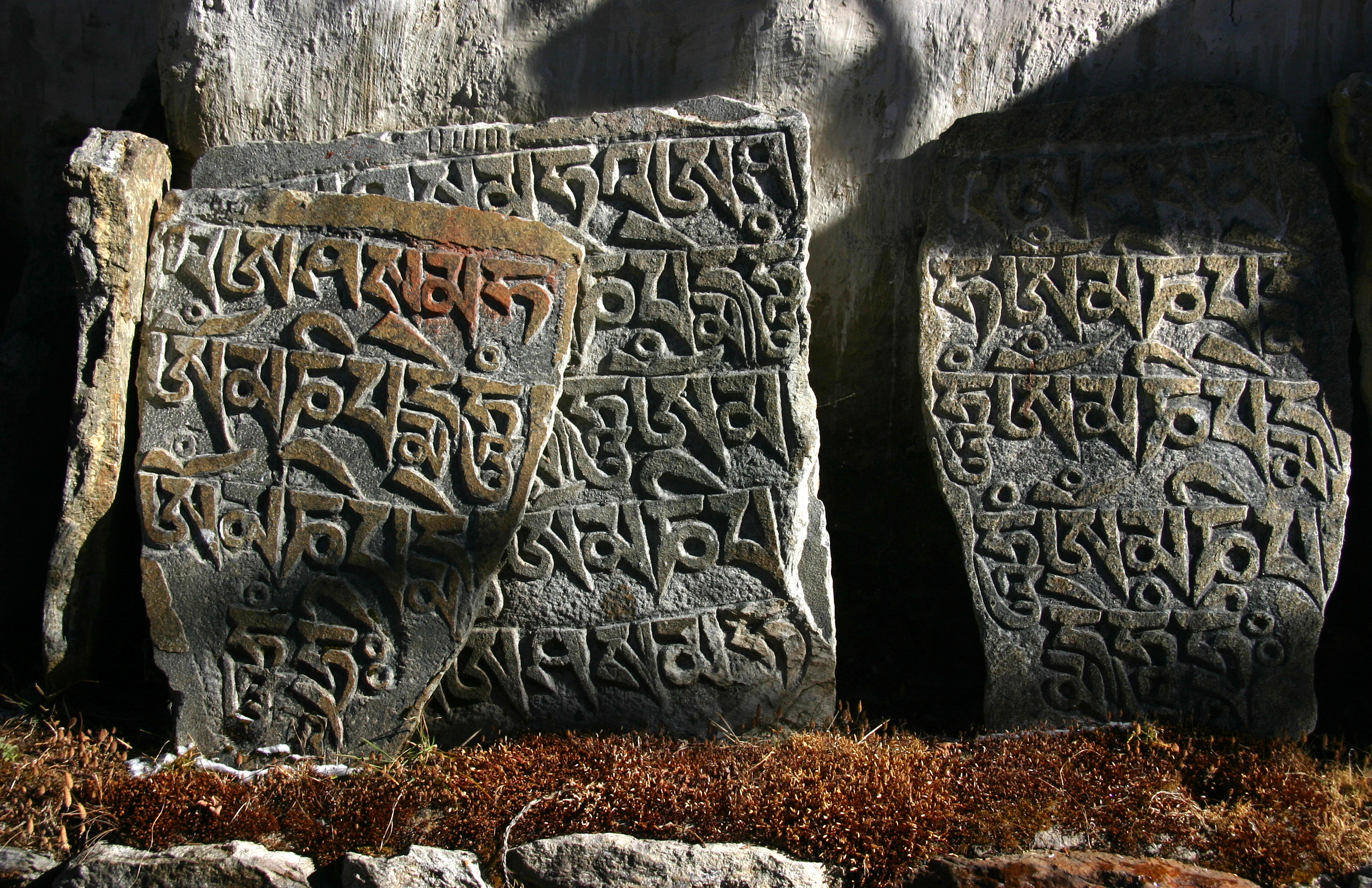
Deboche

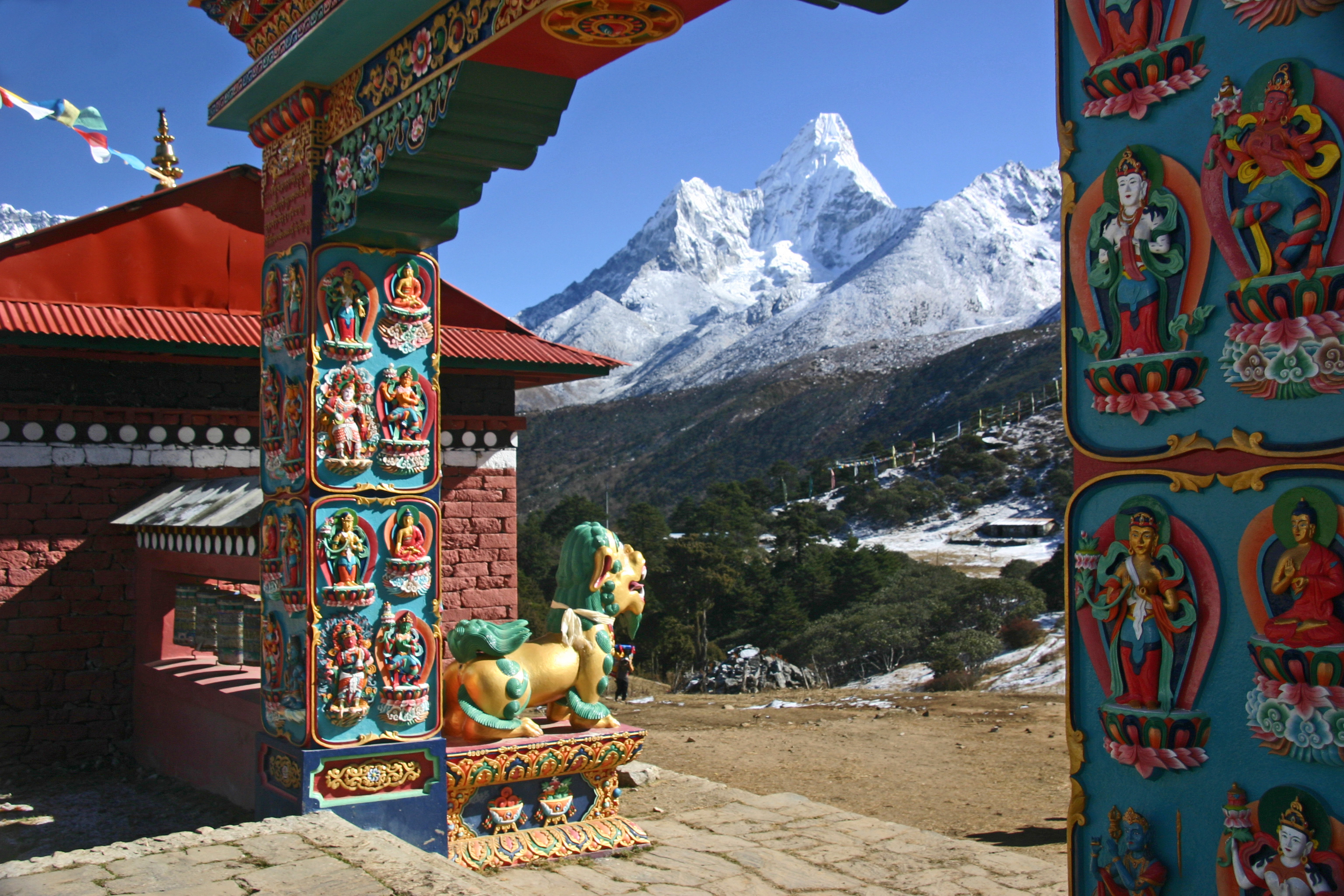
Tengboche
