= Chukhung =

- village
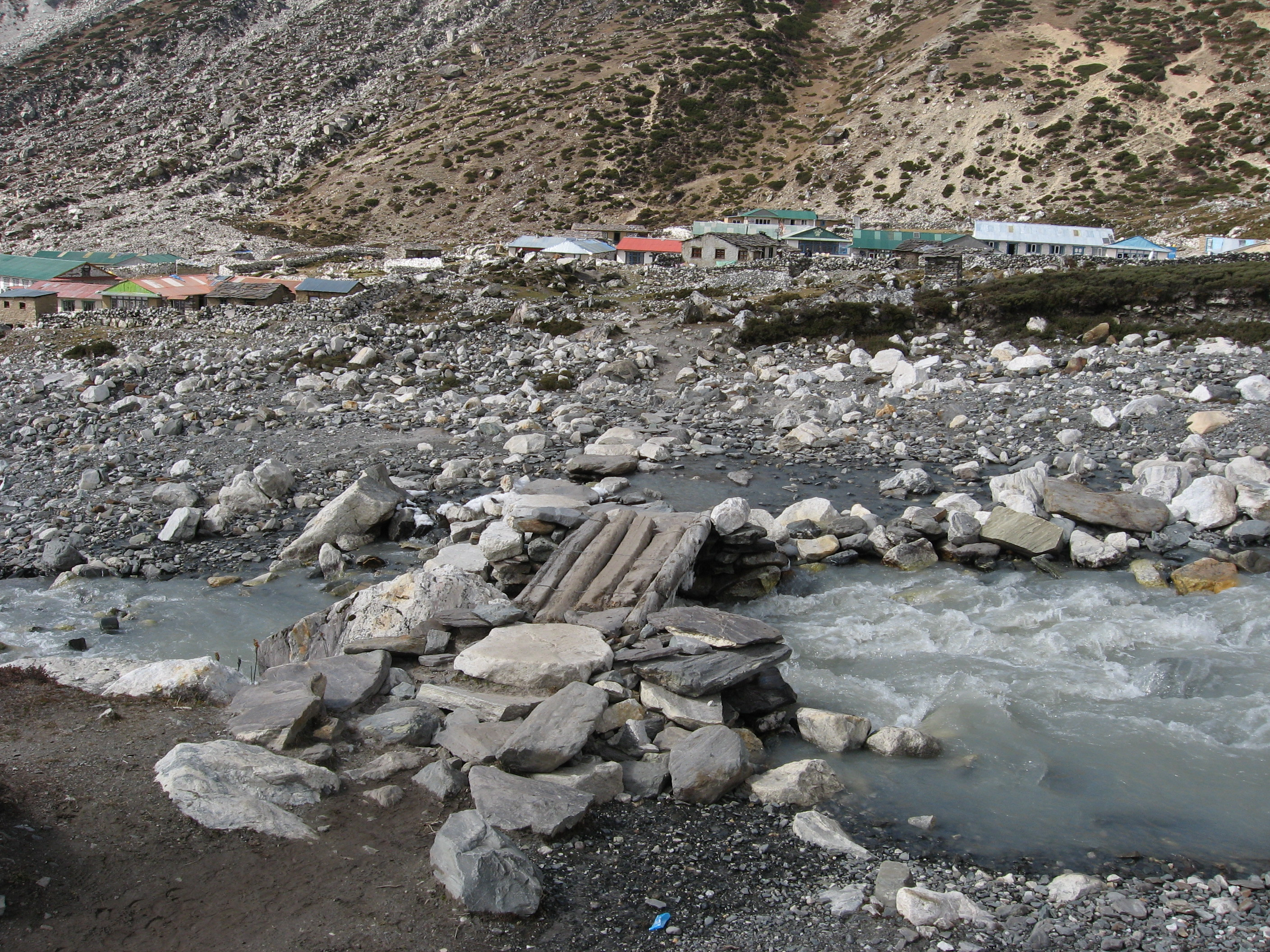
- Chukhung from the trail leading to Island Peak (2012)

- Location within Nepal
- Coordinates: 27°54′18″N 86°52′17″E
- Country: Nepal
- Region: Khumbu
- Elevation: 4,730 m (15,520 ft)

Chukhung is a lodge village serving trekkers and climbers in the Khumbu region of Nepal in the Himalayas south of Mount Everest.

The Chukhung Valley lies on the southern slopes of Lhotse and Nuptse by the Lho Glacier and the Nup Glacier, the western slopes of Cho Polu and Baruntse by the Imja Glaciers, and the northern slopes of Mount Ama Dablam by the Ama Dablam Glacier and Chukhung Glacier. It extends westward past the village of Dingboche where it joins the Pheriche Valley. The Imja Khola flows through the Chukhung Valley. There are 9 lodges in Chukung, all used by climbers to Imja Tse (also called Island Peak).

Chukhung village, at 4,730 metres (15,518 ft), is on a left fork of the Imja Khola. Administratively, it is in the Solukhumbu District of Koshi Province. This area was traditionally used as a yak pasture with no permanent habitation. As Imja Tse has gained popularity as a trekking peak and the Chukhung Valley is a good acclimatization side trip for Everest Base Camp trekkers, several lodges have been built there.

Chukhung Ri is a rocky peak rising above the village of Chukhung to 5,546 metres (18,196 ft). This village is classified as a trekking peak by Nepal Government, which means climbers do not need permits for climbing this peak.
