= List of glaciers in Asia =

This is a list of glaciers in Asia.

== List of glaciers ==
=== China ===
- Angsi Glacier- Tibet
- Bayi Glacier - Qinghai
- Hailogou Galicer - SiChuan
- July 1 Glacier - GanSu
- Kangshung Glacier- Tibet
- Laigou Galicer - Tibet
- Midui Galicer - Tibet
- Mingyong Glacier - Yunnan
- Muzart Glacier - Xinjiang
- Purog Kangri Glacier - Tibet
- Puruogangri - Tibet
- Rongbuk Glacier - Tibet
- Sarpo Laggo Glacier - Xinjiang
- Teram Kangri Glacier - Xinjiang
- Touming Mengke Glacier - GanSu
- Urumqi Glacier No.1 - Xinjiang
- Urdok Glacier - Xinjiang
- Yinsugaiti Glacier - Xinjiang

=== Indonesia ===
- Carstensz Glacier
- West Northwall Firn
- East Northwall Firn

All three are on Puncak Jaya. The Meren Glacier on the summit disappeared at some time between 1992 and 2000.

=== India ===
- List of glaciers of India

=== Japan ===
==== Nagano Prefecture ====
- Kakunesato Glacier, Mount Kashimayari

==== Toyama Prefecture ====
- Gozenzawa Glacier, Mount Tate
- Kuranosuke Glacier, Mount Tate
- Komado Glacier, Mount Tsurugi
- Sannomado Glacier, Mount Tsurugi
- Ikenotan Glacier, Mount Tsurugi

=== Kazakhstan ===
- Gorodetsky Glacier

=== Kyrgyzstan ===
- Engilchek Glacier
- Sarychat glacier

=== Mongolia ===
==== Bayan-Ölgii Province ====
- Potanin Glacier

=== Nepal ===
- Hunku Glacier
- Imja Glacier
- Khumbu Glacier

=== Pakistan ===
- Abruzzi Glacier
- Baltoro Glacier
- Batura Glacier
- Biafo Glacier
- Biarchedi Glacier
- Bilafond Glacier in the Siachen area claimed by both Pakistan and India.
- Godwin-Austen Glacier
- Gondogoro Glacier
- Hainablak Glacier
- Hispar Glacier
- Hussaini Glacier
- Hoper Glacier
- Lonak Glacier
- Miar Glacier
- Panmah Glacier
- Passu Glacier
- Rupal Glacier
- Sachiokuh Glacier
- Sarpo Laggo Glacier
- Shaigri Glacier
- Shandar Glacier
- Shani Glacier
- Shireen Maidan Glacier
- Shishpar Glacier
- Shuijerab Glacier
- Shutwerth Glacier
- Silkiang Glacier
- Sim Glacier
- Siru Glacier
- Skora La Glacier
- Sokha Glacier
- South Barum Glacier
- Sovoia Glacier
- Stokpa Lungma Glacier
- Sumayar Bar Glacier
- Tarashing Glacier
- Thalo Glacier
- Thui Glacier
- Toltar Glacier
- Toshain Glacier
- Trango Glacier
- Trivor Glacier
- Tsarak Tsa Glacier
- Udren Glacier
- Uli Biaho Glacier
- Ultar Glacier
- Upper Khurdopin Glacier
- Upper Tirich Glacier
- Vigne Glacier
- West Vigne Glacier
- Wyeen Glacier
- Yermanendu Glacier
- Yazghill Glacier
- Yishkuk Glacier
- Yukshgoz Glacier
- Zindikharam Glacier

=== Tajikistan ===
- Fedchenko Glacier
- Russian Geographical Society Glacier

== See also ==
- List of glaciers
