= Num Ri =

Mountain in Nepal

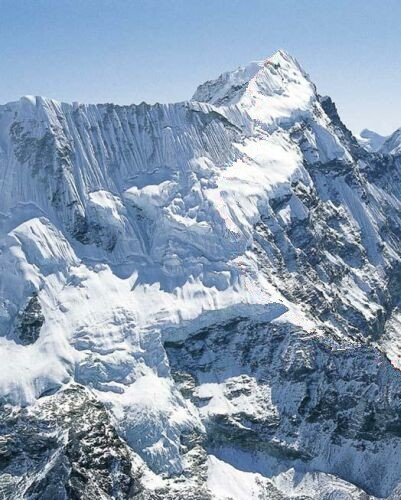
- Num Ri

Highest point
- Elevation: 6,635 m (21,768 ft)
- Prominence: 330 m (1,080 ft)
- Coordinates: 27°53′41″N 86°58′15″E

Geography
- Location within Nepal
- Location: Khumbu, Nepal
- Parent range: Himalayas

Climbing
- First ascent: 2002
- Easiest route: glacier/snow/ice climb

Num Ri is a mountain in the Khumbu region of the Nepalese Himalayas. Num Ri consists of a long ridge that culminates eastwards in a pyramid summit. Neighbouring mountains are Island Peak, Cho Polu, and Baruntse, a popular trekking peak.

Num Ri was first climbed on November 7, 2002 by the German climbers Olaf Rieck, Lydia Schubert and Carsten Schmidt.
