= Imja Khola =

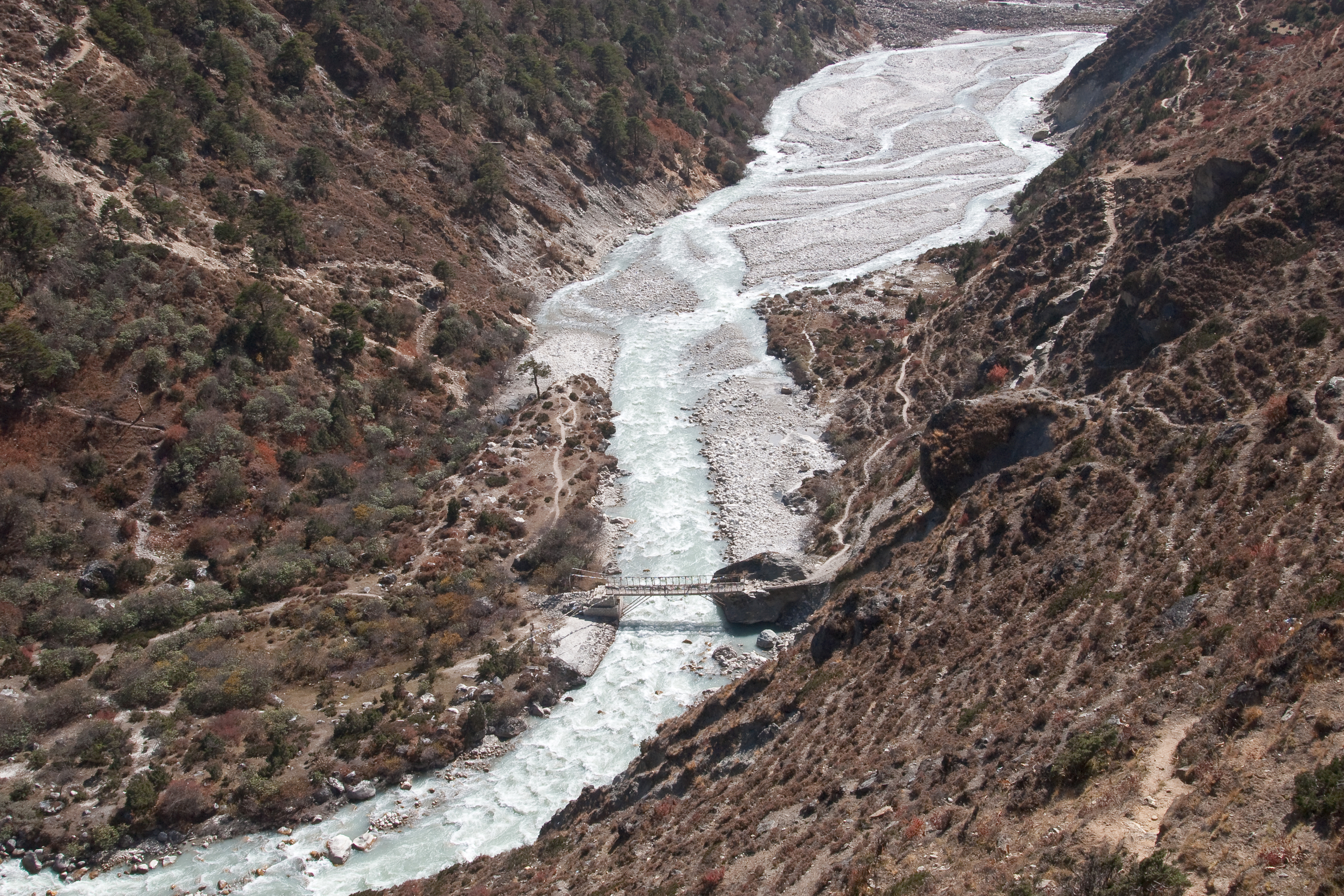
- Imja Khola river near Pangboche

Location
- Country: Nepal

Physical characteristics
- Source
  - location: Imja Glacier
- Mouth
  - location: Dudh Kosi at Tengboche
  - coordinates: 27°47′35″N 86°42′58″E

Basin features
- River system: Koshi River

The Imja Khola (Nepali: इम्जा खोला) is a tributary of the Dudh Kosi river in eastern Nepal. It drains the slopes of Mount Everest. The Khumbu Glacier melts into the Lobujya (Lobuche) River, which flows southward as the Imja Khola to its confluence with the Dudh Kosi at Tengboche.

The Imja Khola collects water from the Imja Glacier through the Dingboche Valley.

== River course ==
The river rises in the lake Imja Tsho, which is mainly formed by the waters of the Imja Glacier, it flows in the direction southwest through the village of Dingboche, then it merges with the river Lobuche, which flows south from the Khumbu Glacier, then flows southward to its confluence with the Dudh Kosi near the village of Tengboche.

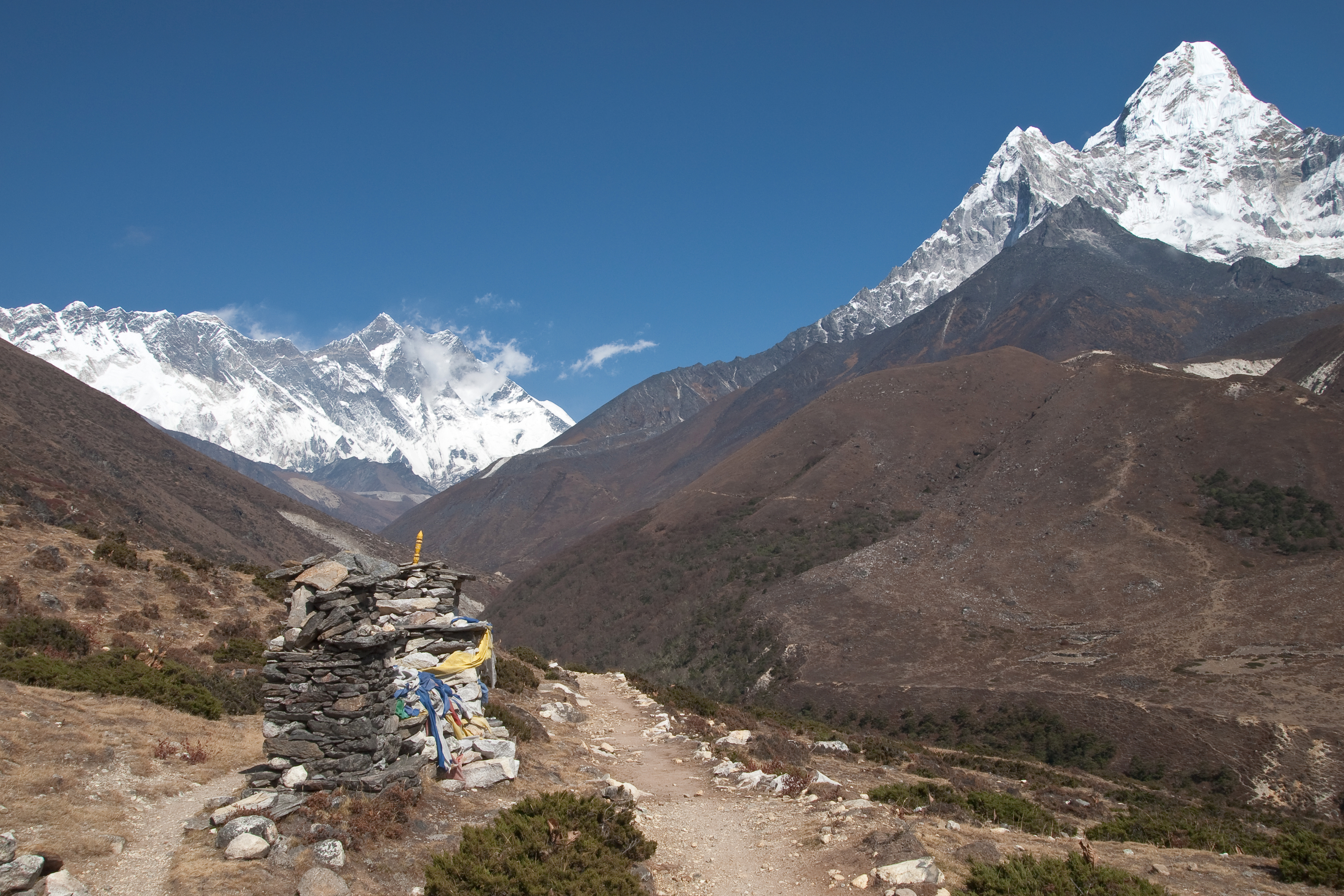
The Imja Khola valley

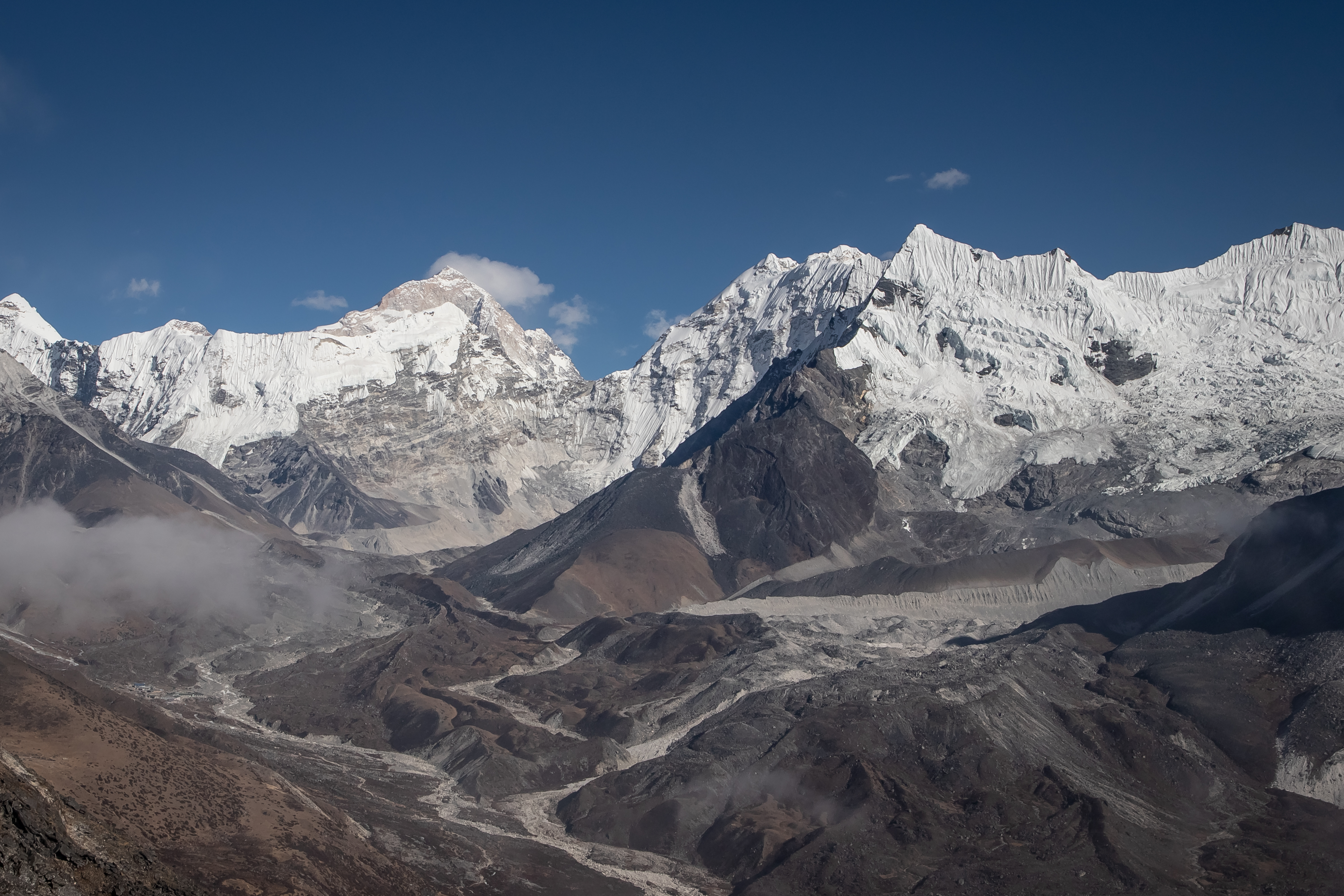
Glaciers providing water for the Imja Khola

== Trekking ==
The Imja Khola is on the trekking route in the Everest base camp region, between Thyangboche and Dingboche at 4,360 metres (14,300 ft). During the Everest Base Camp Trek, trekkers cross a suspension bridge, over the Imja Khola, moving towards the village of Dingboche. Dingboche, the 'Summer Valley; of the Khumbu has a kilometer-long wall built to protect the village's crops from the cold winds that descends down the Imja Valley. There is a monastery at Pangboche at 3,900 metres (12,800 ft). The trek is through a Rhododendron forest.

It is also on the trekking route to Chukhung and the Imja Tse or Island peak.
