= Lhotse Shar Glacier =

Glacier in Nepal

Lhotse Shar
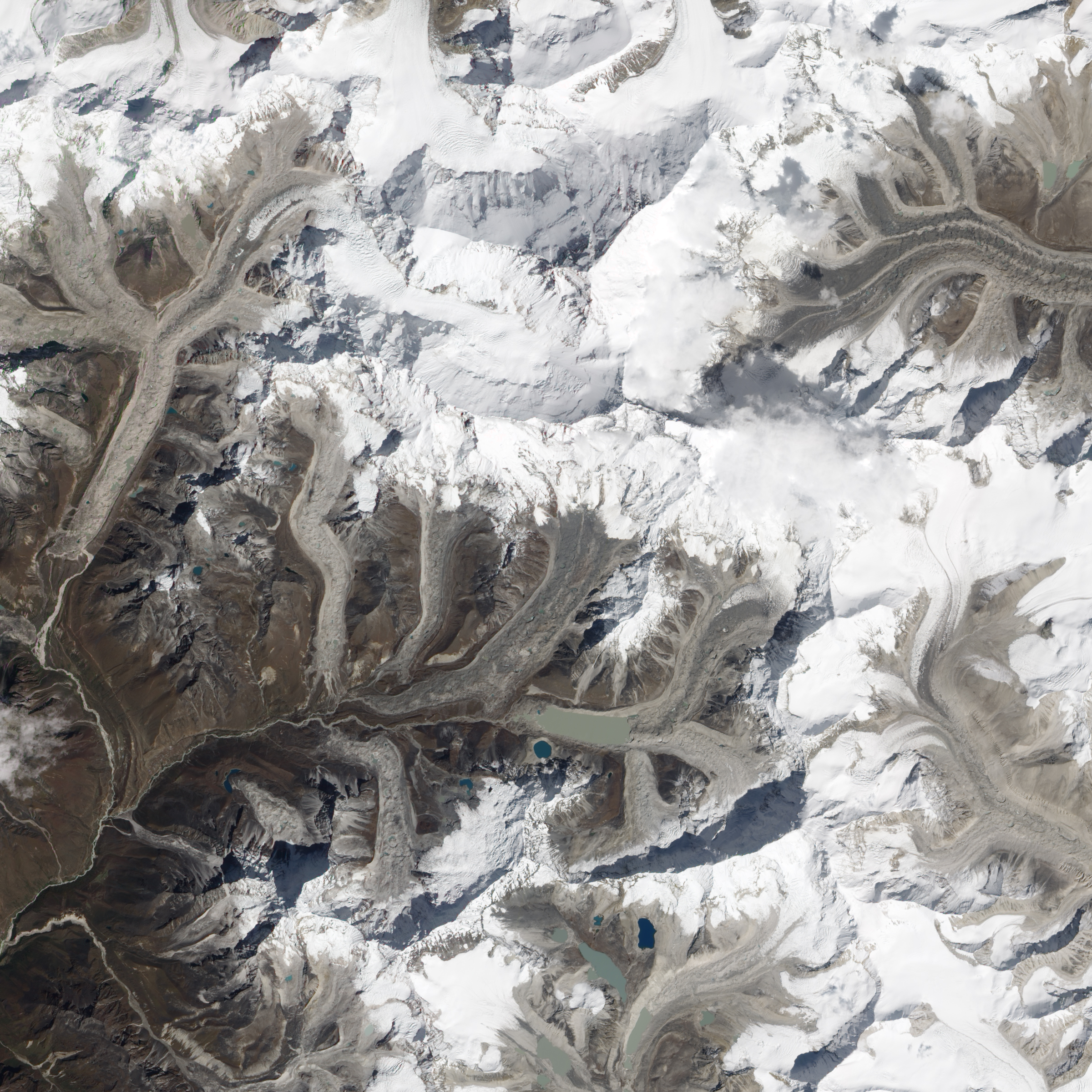
- The glacier is located to the northeast of the rounder Imja Tsho lake shown south of centre

- Location within Nepal Location within Tibet
- Interactive map of Lhotse Shar
- Type: Valley glacier
- Location: Nepal
- Coordinates: 27°57′42″N 86°56′00″E

Lhotse Shar is a glacier of the Himalayas in the Solukhumbu District of Nepal. It adjoins Imja Glacier to the northeast and with Ambulapcha Glacier forms three major glaciers. To the east is Cho Polu, which is 6,734 m (22,093 ft) in height.
