= Everest Marathon =

Marathon held in Solukhumbu, Nepal

- Everest Marathon Logo
- Date: May 29
- Location: Everest Base Camp, ending in Namche Bazar
- Event type: Trail
- Distance: Marathon, Half-Marathon and Ultramarathon
- Established: Nepal Mountaineering Association (NMA) 1985; 41 years ago
- Website: www.everestmarathon.com

Everest Marathon is an annual marathon event, held in the district of Solukhumbu, Nepal, around the vicinity of Mount Everest in May. With its starting point at 5401m Meter (Higher Everest Base Camp Height) from where the Climbing of Mount Everest Peak starts through the Ice Fall, the marathon is considered to be one of the highest and toughest races in the world. The marathon starts at the Mt. Everest Base Camp, and moves through the traditionally used high Sherpa trails of Khumbu Valley.

The event is officially approved and recognized by the Government of Nepal as part of its annual tourism calendar. In recognition of the first successful ascent of the highest peak in the world by the duo of Late Tenzing Norgay Sherpa and Sir Edmund Hillary on 29 May 1953, this event was officially named the Tenzing Hillary Everest Marathon.

The marathon includes three different categories for its participants, which include a 60 km extreme ultramarathon race, a 42 km full marathon race and a 21 km Half Marathon race.

== History ==
The event was originally pioneered by Jan Turner and Tony Hunt in 1985. It was the organised in conjunction with Bufo Ventures with Jan Turner as Race Director in 1987 and 1989. It was organised biannually until 2003 when a rival event was organised under the management of Himalayan Expeditions and was promoted by the Nepal Tourism Board. The first edition of their marathon was held on 19 May 2003 organised on the occasion of 50th anniversary of climbing of Everest by Tenzing Norgay Sherpa and Sir Edmund Hillary by the Ministry of Tourism of Nepal under the management of a Nepal-based travel company Himalayan Expeditions headed by tourism professional Bikram Pandey. The first Event Director of this event was Sarad Pradhan, a tourism and media professional. Since then, the event has been organized annually by the company, with the official approval from the Nepal Government and the Nepal Tourism Board. First it was organised as Golden Jubilee Everest Marathon and from 2004 onward it has been organised as Tenzing Hillary Everest Marathon. On 27 November 1987, the Nepal Government officially released a stamp in recognition of the marathon and repeated this accolade again in 2014.

Everest Marathon is world highest running race organized in Khumbu region of Nepal every year. It was first organized in 1987. The destinations to cover during this race are: Everest Base Camp, Gorekh Shep, Lobuche, Tengboche and Namche Bazaar. As it ends at Namche Bazaar starting from Everest Base Camp, it covers total distance of 42km (26.2 mile).

The first version of this event continued under the title, The Original Everest Marathon is also held in the same region. This event is organized by a British charity group with Gorakhshep (5212m) as the starting point. This marathon is usually organized around the Autumn months of October or November.

== Race ==
The Everest Marathon is open to runners aged 18 or above from all over the world, as long as they fulfill a certain set of criteria. A medical checkup certificate from authorized health professionals that certifies the runner's ability to withstand high altitude conditions is mandatory while submitting the application form. Considering the high altitude conditions of the race, runners are also advised by the organizers to take a minimum of 1–5 days for acclimatization. All runners are also compulsorily required to have valid health insurance before participation. The marathon has a participation limit of around 250 runners across all categories.

=== Race day ===
The race is traditionally held on 29 May every year since its inception. However, in 2015, the race was postponed to early October after the devastating Nepal Earthquake.

=== Starting times ===
The start timing for the marathon differ according to each category. The ultramarathon starts at 5:00AM, while the full marathon starts at 7:00AM and finally the half marathon starts at 8:00AM.

=== Course ===
Depending upon the category, the race has different starting points. The starting point for the full marathon and the extreme ultra-marathon category is the Khumbu Icefall, which lies at an altitude 5356m above sea level. The half-marathon starts from Dingboche which lies at an altitude of 4359m.

==== Extreme ultra marathon ====
The longest route in the event is the extreme ultra marathon, which moves through the following route:

Khumbu Icefall (0km-5356m) → Gorakhshep (4.6km-5170m) → Lobuche (9.6km-4940m) → Thukla (12.3km-4612m) → Dingboche (17.3km-4395m) → Pangboche (23.3km-4012m) → Phortse (29.3km-3904m) → Nha la (39.3km-4381m) → Machhermo (41.4km-4413m) → Phortse Tenga (45.9km-4059m) → Mongla (50.4km-3980) → Kyanjuma (55.4km-3650m) → Namche (60km-3550m)

==== Full marathon ====
The most popular category in the event is the full marathon, which moves through the following route

Khumbu Icefall (0km-5356m) → Gorakhshep (4.6km-5170m) → Lobuche (9.6km-4940m) → Thukla (12.3km-4612m) → Dingboche (17.3km-4395m) → Bibre Loop(21.5km-4349m) → Pangboche (27.5km-4012m) → Tengboche (32.6km-3868m) → Laubisasa (36.1km-3439m) → Kyanjuma (37.6km-3650m) → Namche (42.195km-3550m)

==== Half marathon ====
The half-marathon even is an event exclusive only for non-Nepali nationals, which moves through the following route

Dingboche (0km-4395m) → Pangboche (7km-4012m) → Tengboche (11.5km-3868m) → Laubisasa (15km-3439m) → Kyanjuma (16.5km-3650m) → Namche (21-km-3550m)

== Notable features ==
=== Acclimatization ===
The Everest Marathon is a high-altitude race held in a region with low atmospheric pressure and oxygen levels, with some parts covered by snow all year round. Thus, to avoid health risks like altitude sickness, snow blindness and cold allergy, runners often require some days for acclimatization in the race. Usually, participants are advised by the event organizers to stay around the region for a few days or even hike towards the starting point from Lukla. Some agencies even prefer the participants spending up to 7 days for preparation of the trip.

=== Participation number limits and ecologically conscious practices ===
To protect the fragile natural ecosystem around the Everest region lying within the borders of the Sagarmatha National Park, the number of participants are capped so as to prevent environmental problems arising from overcrowding. Typically, organizers cap the numbers at around 250 every year. The organizers also have integrated a concept making Everest Marathon a Green Event by applying waste minimization, as well as implementing clean waste disposal practices.

=== Off-Road Trail ===
The Everest Marathon route consists entirely of off-road non-tarmac surfaces. Runners will need to navigate through natural trails, stone trails, and steps, and sometimes even snowy and muddy trails. Thus, the route requires special clothing gears, and equipment for navigating the trails.

=== Elevation drop ===
The total elevation drop between the start and finish points can be as high as 1620m. The lowest point in the route is at Laubisasa, which is located 3439m above sea level.
