= Ambulapcha Glacier =

Glacier in Nepal

Ambulapcha
- Location within Nepal Location within Tibet
- Interactive map of Ambulapcha
- Type: Valley glacier
- Location: Nepal
- Coordinates: 27°53′35″N 86°54′47″E

Ambulapcha Glacier is a glacier of the Himalayas in the Solukhumbu District of Nepal. It adjoins Imja Glacier to its south and with Lhotse Shar Glacier forms three major glaciers. It forms the Ambulapcha Tsho glacial lake, located at 27°53′35″N 86°54′47″E.
