= Cho Polu =

Mountain in Khumbu, Nepal

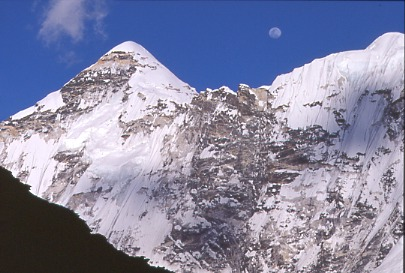
- Cho Polu from the southwest

Highest point
- Elevation: 6,735 m (22,096 ft) (Note: Another source states 6711 m.)
- Prominence: 563 m (1,847 ft)
- Listing: Mountains of Nepal
- Coordinates: 27°55′10″N 86°59′01″E

Geography
- Location within Nepal
- Country: Nepal
- Province: Koshi
- Region: Khumbu
- Parent range: Mahalangur

Climbing
- First ascent: November 1984
- Easiest route: snow/ice climb by North face

Cho Polu is a mountain in the Khumbu region of eastern Nepal. Southern neighbors include Num Ri and Baruntse while Imja Tse (a popular trekking peak) lies immediately to the west.

== Climbing history ==
The Himalayan Index lists a first ascent in 1954, as reported in 1955 in both Mountain World and the New Zealand Alpine Journal in 1955. In their book East of Everest, Edmund Hillary and George Lowe wrote that Norman Hardie had climbed a large domed ice peak of 22,060 ft with Sirdar Urkien, a Sardar or Sherpa mountain guide, on June 3, 1954 and that the "people in the Imja refer to this mountain as Cho Polu." However, there is doubt about the true nature of the 1954 summit, as both the Himalayan Database maintained by Elizabeth Hawley and the editors of the American Alpine Journal hold that the first known ascent of Cho Polu took place in the autumn of 1984, when the Spanish climber Nil Bohigas soloed it unauthorized via the north face and northeast ridge. It is possible that the British climber Trevor Piling also climbed the peak from the north in 1989, but he disappeared in the Annapurna Sanctuary shortly after and did not report on it. The second confirmed ascent and first official ascent was made by the German team of Olaf Rieck, Dieter Rülker, Markus Walter (leader) and Günter Jung on November 12, 1999 by the north face. The third confirmed ascent was made on November 12, 2011 by Spanish climber Jordi Corominas on the west face and southwest ridge.
