= Gozenzawa Glacier =

Glacier in Japan

- Location within Toyama Prefecture Location within Japan
- Interactive map of Gozenzawa Glacier
- Location: Mount Ōyama Japan
- Coordinates: 36.572°N 137.623°E

Gozenzawa Glacier is located on the eastern side of Mount Ōyama in the Tateyama Mountains.

== Geography ==
It was the first recorded glacier in Japan. Before its identification as a glacier, it was believed that the world's most easterly glacier outside Antarctica was on the Kamchatka Peninsula in Russia.

== Exploration ==
The exploration of the glacier was started in 2009 by drilling a 20 m hole in Tateyama Caldera. By 2011, GPS readings showed that the glacier had moved by about 7 to 32 centimeters.

== See also ==
- List of glaciers in Japan
