= Chhewang Nima =

Nepalese Sherpa

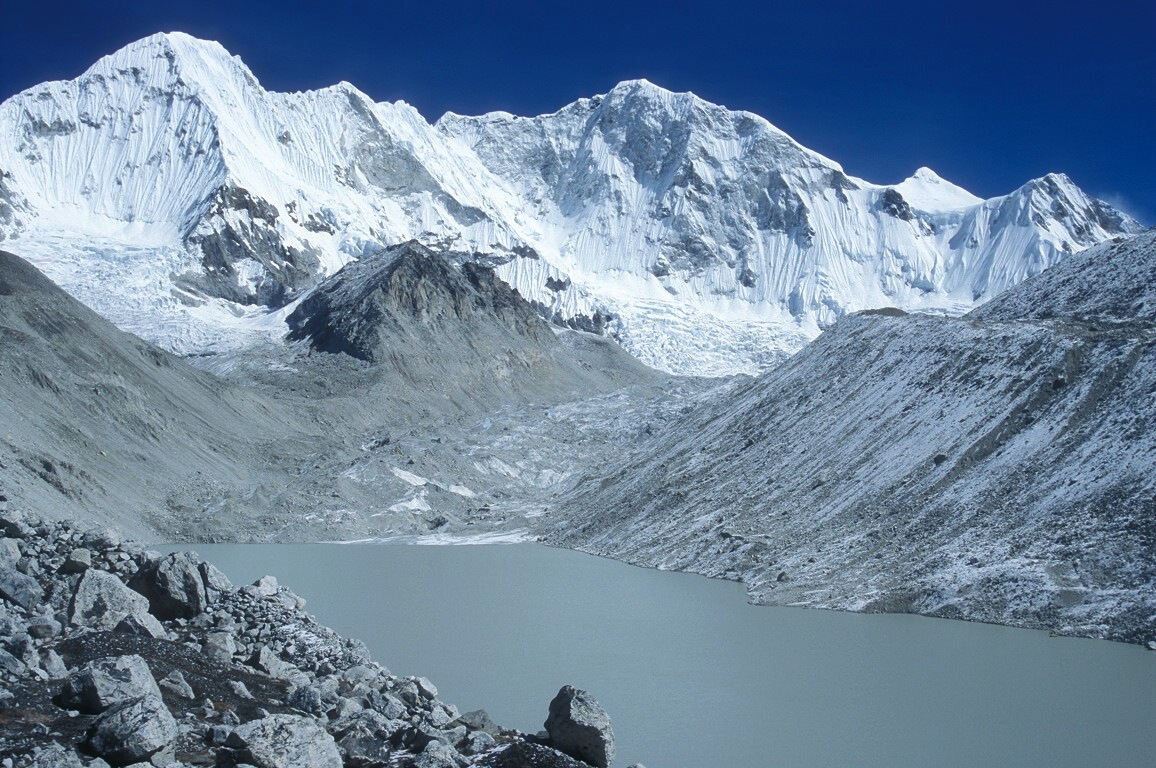
Mount Baruntse in the Himalayas

Chhewang Nima (Nepali: छेवाङ निमा) (c. 1967 – 23 October 2010) was a Nepalese Sherpa who climbed Mount Everest 19 times. He was also called Chuwang Nima, and Chuwang Nima Sherpa.

Nima disappeared on 24 October 2010, after being struck by an avalanche near the summit of Baruntse. The search for him was called off the following day. His loss in the avalanche and subsequent search made international news. He worked as a professional mountaineer, but at the time of his loss he was helping another team fix lines after they had asked for help.

== Notable ascents ==
Everest

- 19 May 1998
- 20 May 2006 Chuwang Nima Sherpa (Tesho, Nepal)

Ama Dablam

- 26 October 2009 Chuwang Nima Sherpa (Tesho, Nepal)

At the time of Nima's death, he had summited Everest 19 times, which was then one short of Apa Sherpa's record of 20 (which Apa has since increased).

== See also ==
- List of Mount Everest summiters by number of times to the summit
- List of 20th-century summiters of Mount Everest
