= Hunku Glacier =

Glacier in Nepal

Hunku
- Location within Nepal Location within Tibet
- Interactive map of Hunku
- Type: Valley glacier
- Location: Nepal
- Coordinates: 27°51′31″N 86°57′36″E

The Hunku Glacier is located in the Khumbu region of eastern Nepal and forms the southern base of Baruntse mountain (7,220 m).

== See also ==
- List of glaciers
