= Gorodetsky Glacier =

Glacier in Kazakhstan

Coordinates: 42°59′3″N 77°3′31″E

The Gorodetsky Glacier
- The Gorodetsky Glacier
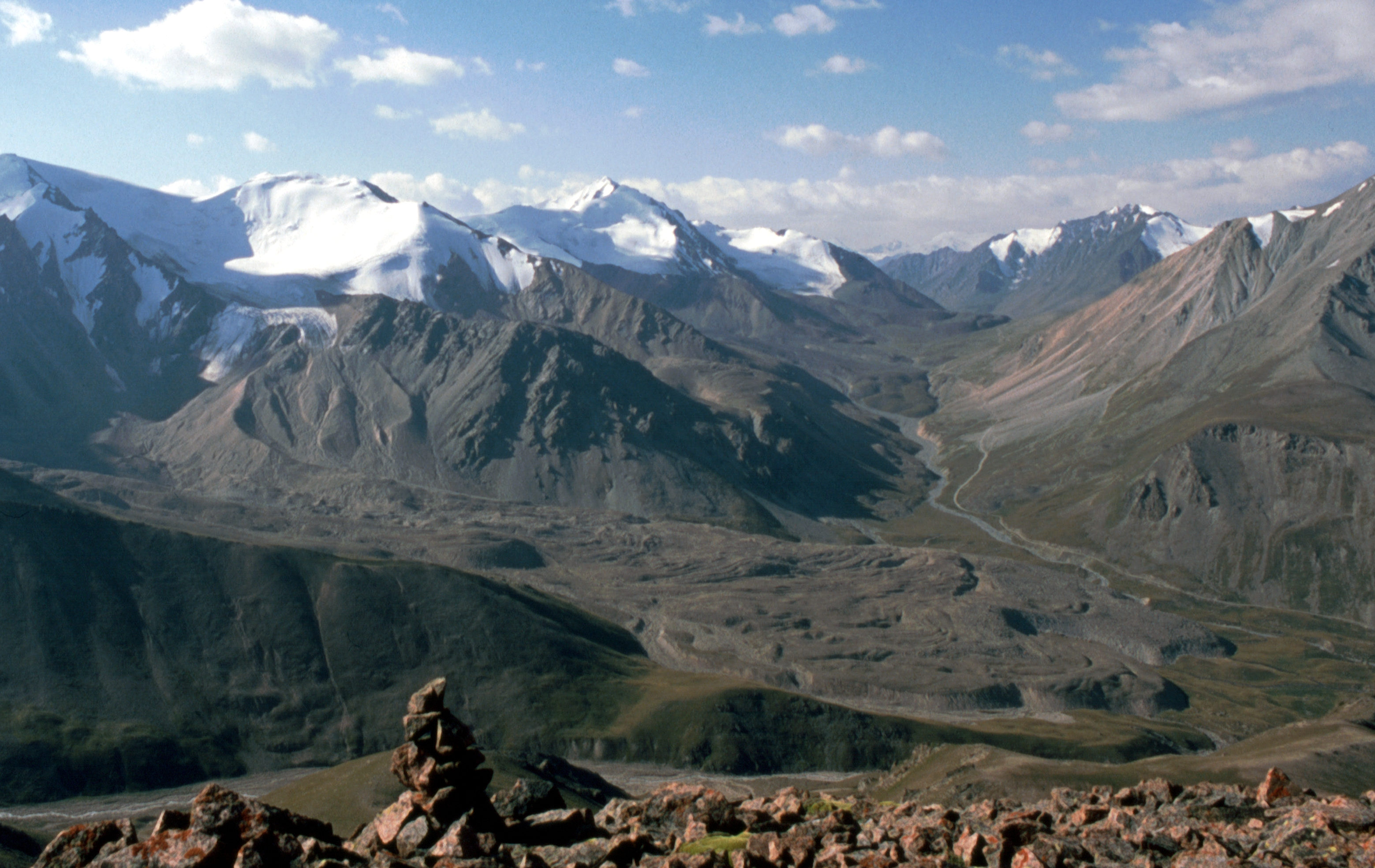
- Interactive map of The Gorodetsky Glacier
- Location: Almaty region, Republic of Kazakhstan
- Area: 3.8 km^{2} (1.5 sq mi)
- Length: 5.5 km (3.4 mi)

The Gorodetsky Glacier is a rock glacier on the northern slope of the Zailiysky Alatau range. The glacier consists of left and right branches. The glacier was visited by dendrologist and archaeologist Vladimir Dmitrievich Gorodetsky (1878–1943) for the first time in 1916. The glacier was named in honor of Gorodetsky 20 years later. In Soviet times, prominent glacier scientists worked on the glacier, including academician of the Academy of Sciences of the Kazakh SSR Nikolai Nikitich Palgov (1889–1970).

== The left branch ==
The left branch of the glacier begins with the steep slopes of the axial ridge, the tops of which rise to a height of 4000 m. The ice volume of the glacier in this branch is 0.14 km3. The line of the branch is located at an altitude of 3770 m. The length of the branch is 5.5 km and the area is 3.8 km2. Since 1982, this branch of the glacier has been retreating. The end of the left branch from 1938 to 1961 retreated by 320 m, the right from 1923 to 1960 by 173 m.

== The right branch ==
The right branch is located in the western direction. It starts from the crest of a side spur that separates the Bolshaya Almatinka river basin from the Talgar river basin. The branch ends at an altitude of 3650 m. The ice volume of the right branch is 0.10 km3.
