= Imja Tsho =

- Imja Lake
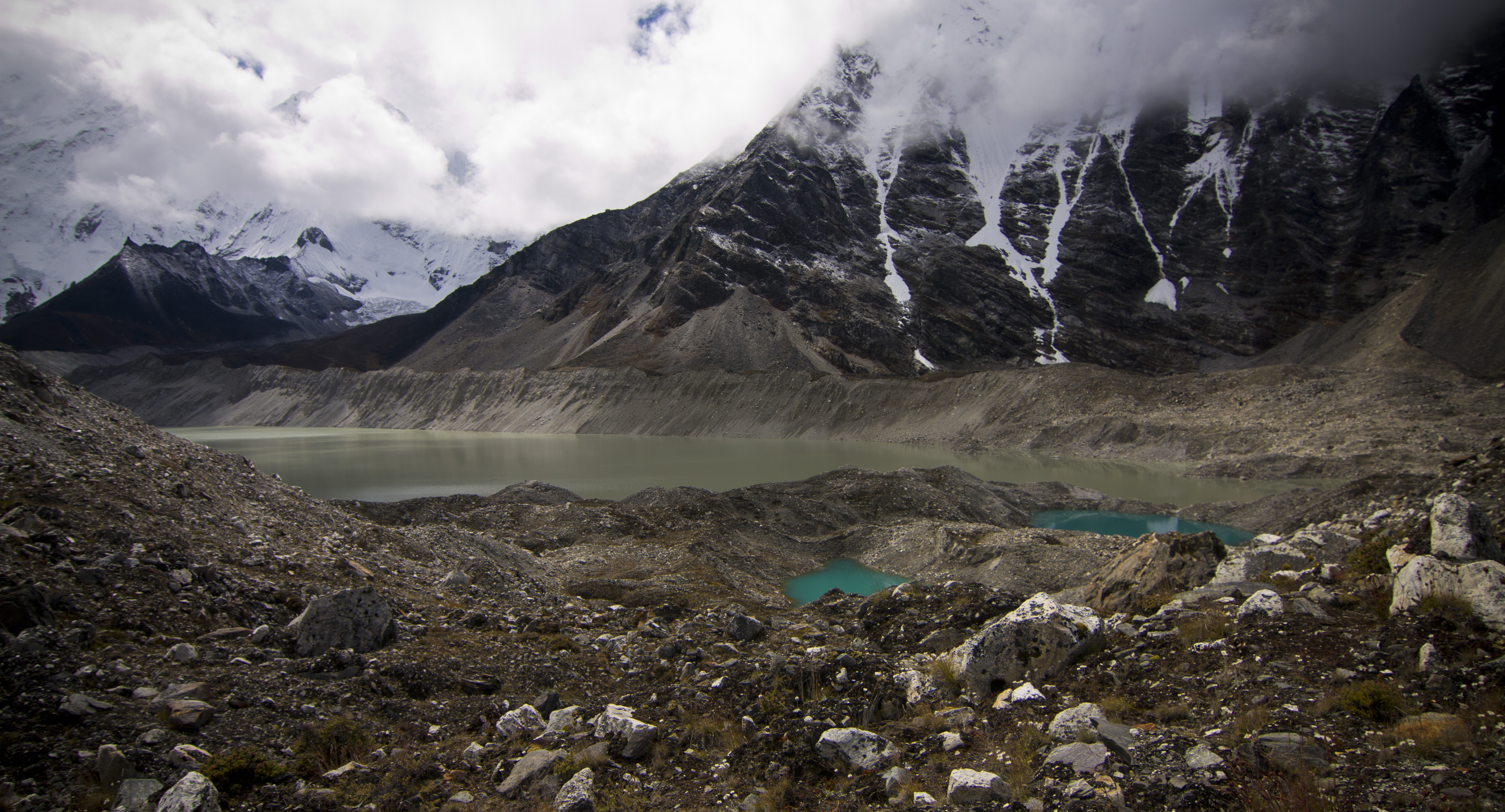

- Location within Nepal
- Interactive map of Imja Tsho
- Location: Nepal
- Coordinates: 27°53′53″N 86°55′41″E
- Type: Glacial lake
- Primary inflows: Imja Glacier
- Primary outflows: Ganges River
- Catchment area: unknown
- Basin countries: Nepal
- Max. length: 2,000 m (6,600 ft)
- Max. width: 650 m (2,130 ft)
- Surface area: 1.3 km^{2} (0.50 sq mi)
- Average depth: 41.6 m (136 ft)
- Max. depth: 90.5 m (297 ft)
- Water volume: 0.0358 km^{3} (0.0086 cu mi)
- Surface elevation: 5,004 m (16,417 ft)

Imja Tsho (or Imja Lake) is a glacial lake created after melt water began collecting at the foot of the Imja Glacier on the lower part of the glacier in the 1950s. A 2009 study described this lake of melt water as one of the fastest-growing in the Himalayas. Held in place by a terminal moraine, Imja Tsho threatens downstream communities with the potential for a glacial outburst flood.

Imja Tsho has been identified as one of the potentially dangerous lakes in Himalaya. It is located at 27° 53' 55" N latitude, 86° 55' 20" E longitude and an altitude of 5010 m in the Everest region of Nepal. The catchment of Imja Tsho occupies the northeastern part of the Dudh Koshi sub-basin. The lake is located on the lower part of the glacier at the toe of its mother glaciers (snout of Imja and Lhotse Shar Glaciers). The Lhotse Shar Glacier flows in a south-westerly direction. The Imja Glacier on the other hand is oriented in a north-westerly direction and has its terminus at about 5,100 m (16,700 ft). These two glaciers coalesce approximately 3.5 km above the terminus and flow westwards just beneath the trekking path of Imja Tse.

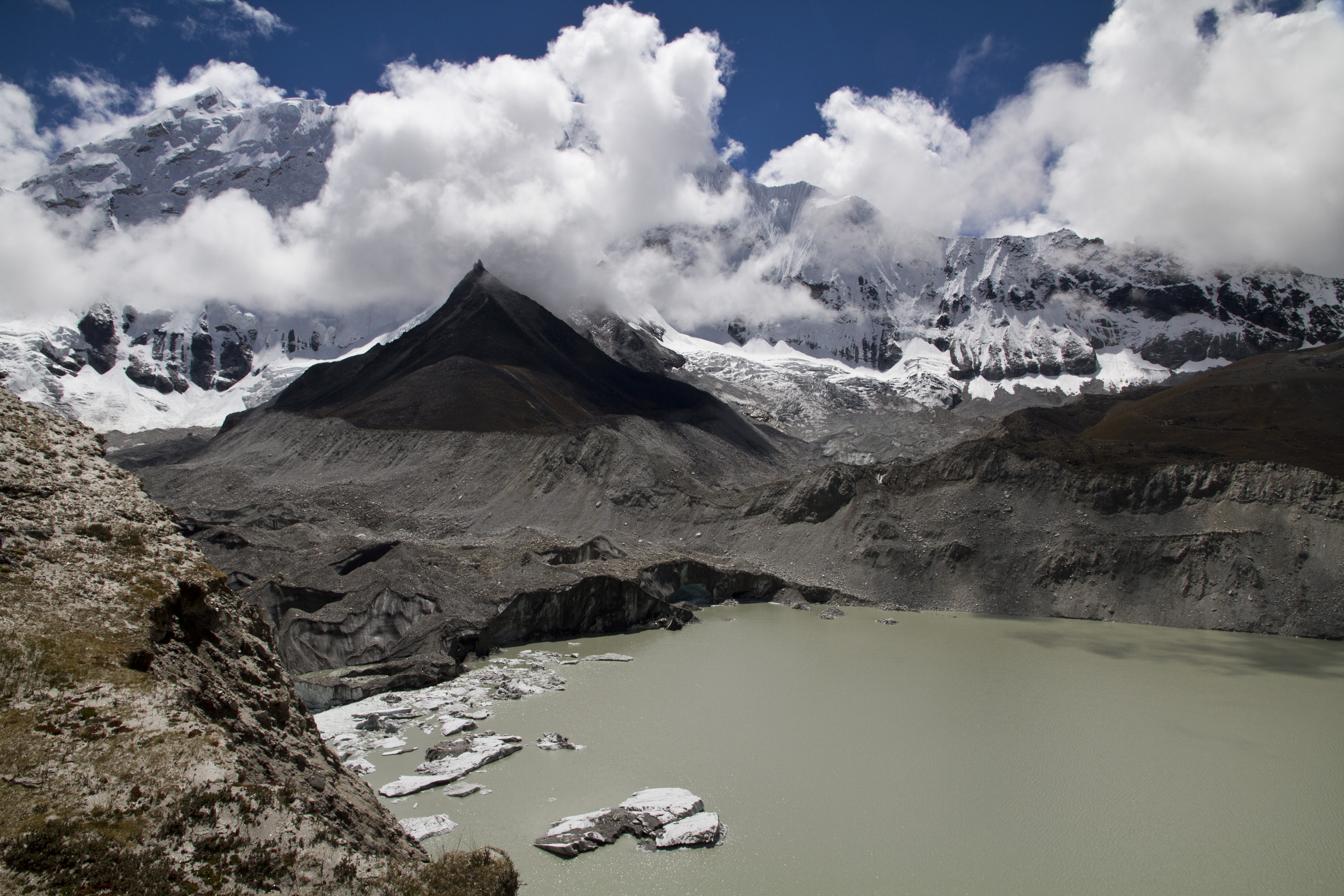
An east-facing view of the confluence of Imja Tsho and the Imja Glacier.

The lake was first mapped in the form of a few ponds from a satellite image taken in 1962. The total area of the ponds was approximately 0.03 km^{2} then (27916 sq m). With the melting of glaciers, the ponds merged into a supra-glacial lake in the 1970s and it has grown continuously ever since. The lake area increased to approximately 0.8 km^{2} (796600 sq m) in 2000 with an average growth rate of 0.02 km^{2} per year. Based on a newly released image of 21 November 2009 on Google Earth, the Imja Tsho has attained an area of 1.055 km^{2} as a result of which the growth rate of the lake has increased to 0.025 km^{2} per year from 2000 to 2009. The preliminary analysis has also shown that there has been an increase of almost 11% in the lake area compared to the area calculated based on satellite images received in October 2008.

In 2016, the United Nations Development Programme together with the Government of Nepal's Nepal Army and Department of Meteorology and Hydrology, with the funding support from the Global Environment Facility (GEF) constructed an outlet and drained over 4 million cubic meters of water from the lake.

== See also ==
- Glacial lake outburst flood
