= Imja Glacier =

Glacier in Nepal

Imja
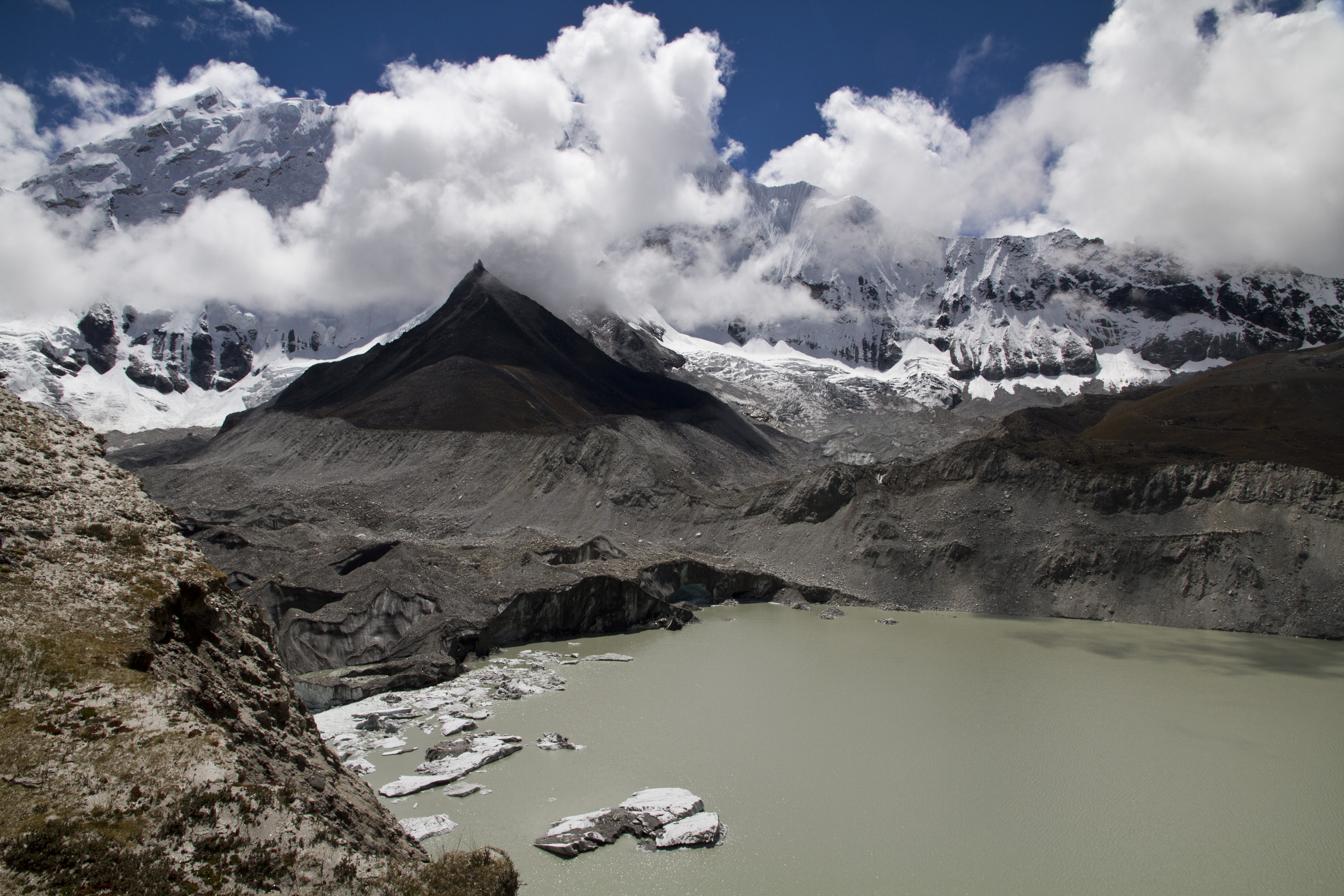
- An east-facing view of the confluence of Imja Tsho lake and the Imja Glacier.

- Location within Nepal Location within Tibet
- Interactive map of Imja
- Type: Valley glacier
- Location: Nepal
- Coordinates: 27°53′54″N 86°55′21″E

Imja Glacier (Nepali: इम्जा हिमनदी) is located in the Himalayas, in the Solukhumbu District of Nepal.

It originates on the western face of Kali Himal, 7,057 metres (23,153 ft), and skirts the southern slopes of Imja Tse or Island Peak, south-east of Mount Everest. It is joined by the Lhotse Shar and Ambulapcha Glaciers. The glacier forms the eastern extent of Imja Tsho, which in turn drains through the Dingboche valley to the Imja Khola, Dudh Kosi, Ganges River and finally the Indian Ocean.

== See also ==
- List of glaciers in Asia
