= Sarychat glacier =

Glacier in Kyrgyzstan

Coordinates: 42.0500°N 78.4500°E

The Sarychat glacier is a north-south-aligned glacier in the western Kakshaal Too mountains of southern Kyrgyzstan. The southernmost ridge delimiting the glacier marks the border with China. The Sarychat glacier is one of two glaciers which feed the Sarychat river before it merges with the Aytali, the other being the Fersmana Glacier to the west.

The north end of the Sarychat glacial valley features mostly shallow limestone peaks covered in scree, while the south end features sharper peaks made of granite or gneiss.
