= Baruntse =

Mountain in Nepal

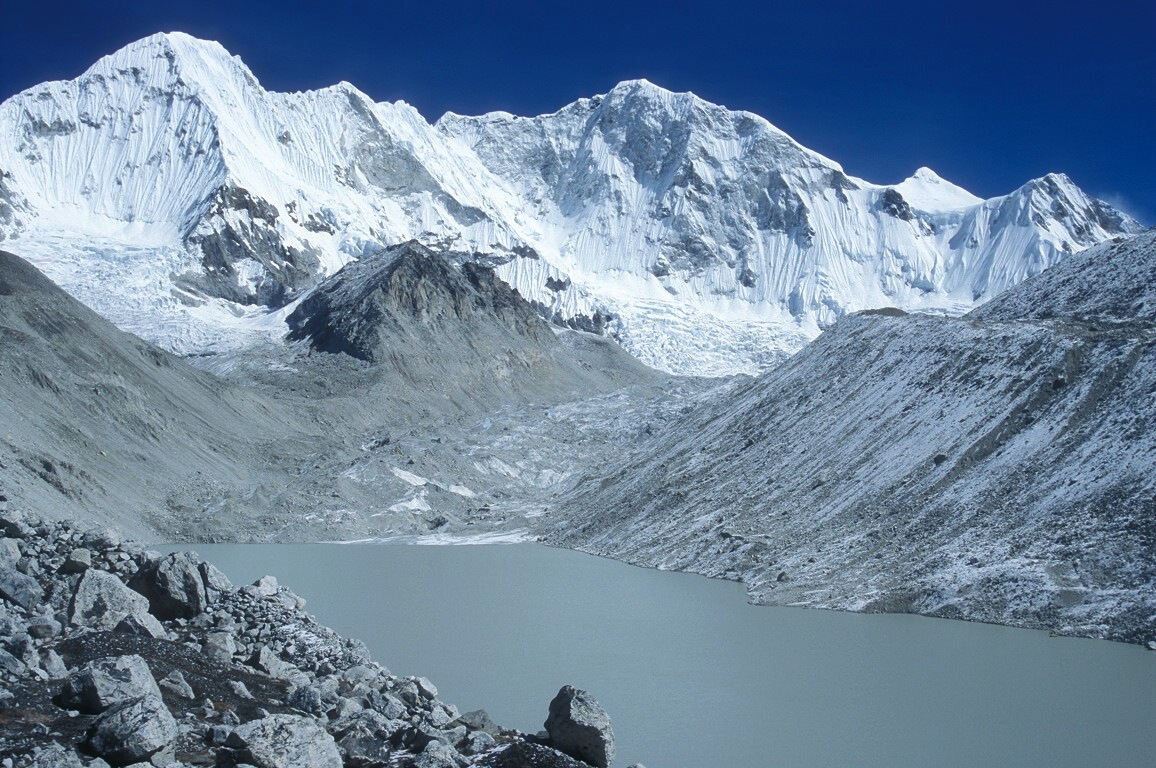
- Baruntse from Hongu Valley

Highest point
- Elevation: 7,162 m (23,497 ft)
- Prominence: 979 m (3,212 ft)
- Coordinates: 27°52′18″N 86°58′48″E

Geography
- Location within Koshi Province Location within Nepal
- Location: Khumbu, Nepal
- Parent range: Himalayas

Climbing
- First ascent: 1954 by New Zealand expedition
- Easiest route: glacier/snow/ice climb

Baruntse is a mountain in the Khumbu region of eastern Nepal, crowned by four peaks and bounded on the south by the Hunku Glacier, on the east by the Barun Glacier, and on the northwest by the Imja Glacier. It is considered as one of the best preparation peaks in the Himalayas for climbers readying themselves for eight-thousanders, however the mountain has a low success rate due to its technical difficulties, steep slopes and unpredictable weather conditions. It is open for beginners, but requires the use of fixed ropes to climb.

The mountain is usually accessed from the South, where climbers can ascend Mera Peak to acclimatize before moving up the valley to the Baruntse base camp. From the village of Lukla, it is an eight-day hike to the base camp.

== First ascents ==
The mountain was first climbed May 30, 1954 via the south ridge by Colin Todd and Geoff Harrow of a New Zealand expedition led by Sir Edmund Hillary.

The first ascent of the East Ridge was made on April 27, 1980, by Lorenzo Ortas, Javier Escartín, Jeronimo Lopez (all Spain) and Carlos Buhler (United States of America) of a Spanish expedition led by Juan José Díaz Ibañez.

In 1994, the first ascent of the North West face of Baruntse North by Vladimir Leitermann, Martin Otta and Tomas Pekarek was nominated for a Piolets d'Or.

The first ascent of the west face was made in 1995 by a Russian team consisting of climbers Valeri Pershin (climbing leader), Evgeni Vinogradski, Salavat Habibulin, Nikolai Zhilin, and Yuri Ermachek. The ascent was made in seven days and the summit was made on October 12.

In 2004, the first ascent of Ciao Patrick (V+/VI M6+ 90°) on the northwest face and northwest ridge of Baruntse North (7,057m) was made by Simone Moro, Bruno Tassi and Denis Urubko. The alpine-style ascent was identified as one of the most notable ascents of the year.

In 2010, Becky Bellworthy from the United Kingdom became the youngest woman to summit Baruntse at 18 years old.

=== Notable climbs and incidents ===
In 1998, prominent American alpinist and ski racer Raoul Wille died of altitude sickness while climbing Baruntse.

Nineteen-times Everest summiteer Chhewang Nima died in 2010 on Baruntse after falling through a cornice while fixing a rope beneath the summit.

In 2013, Petr Machold and Jakub Vaněk from the Czech Republic were lost after attempting to climb up the mountain's west side, which had only been done once previously. They made it to 6,600m. Heavy snow caught them in camp, and when a rescue operation was mounted, the climbers could not be found.

In 2018, Mera, a stray Tibetan mastiff-Himalayan sheepdog cross climbed Baruntse after following a trekking expedition up the mountain. Team leader Don Wargowsky shared his tent and a sleeping mat with the dog, who is thought to be the first canine to ascend a 7,000m peak.

In 2021, Czech climbers Marek Holeček and Radek “Ráďa” Groh attempted the North-West face climb that had caught Machold and Vaněk eight years earlier. The perilous climb, which they later named "Heavenly Trap", lasted ten days due to increasingly worsening weather conditions. After summiting, the descent took nearly 80 hours. The climbers graded the route VI+ M6+ 80°.
