= Tengboche =

Tengboche तेङबोचे
- Neighbourhood (Hill station)
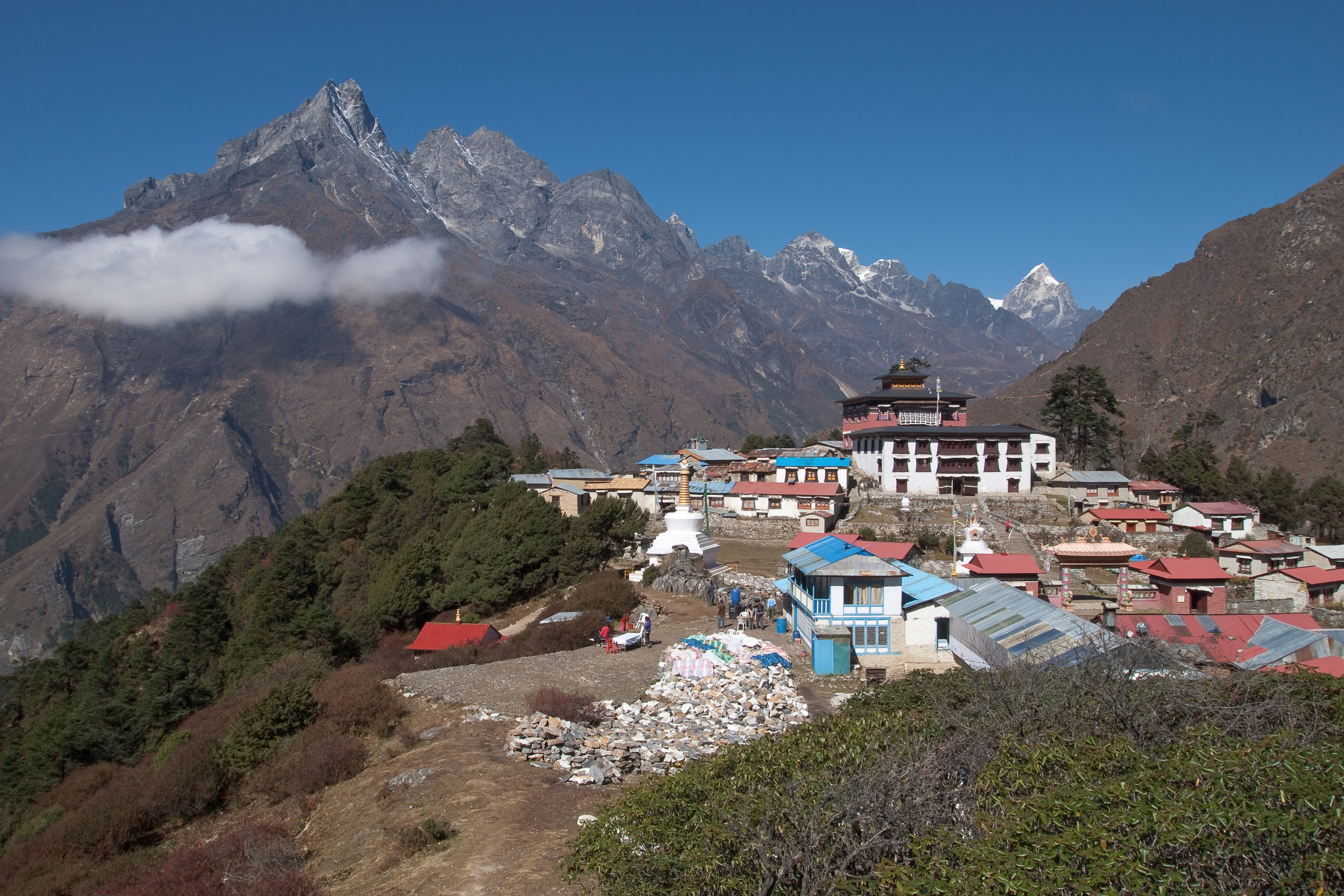
- Tengboche

- Location within Province No. 1 Tengboche (Nepal)
- Coordinates: 27°50′10″N 86°45′50″E
- Country: Nepal
- Province: Koshi Province
- District: Solukhumbu
- Rural Municipality: Khumbu Pasanglhamu
- Elevation: 3,860 m (12,660 ft)
- Time zone: UTC+5:45 (NST)
- Area code: 038

Tengboche (or Thyangboche) is a village in Khumbu Pasanglhamu rural municipality in the Khumbu subregion of Koshi Province in Nepal, located at 3,867 metres (12,687 ft). Within the village is an important Buddhist monastery, Tengboche Monastery, which is the largest gompa in the Khumbu region. The structure was built in 1923. In 1934, it was destroyed by an earthquake but subsequently rebuilt. It was destroyed again by a fire in 1989, and again rebuilt with the help of volunteers and the provision of foreign aid. Tengboche has a panoramic view of the Himalayan mountains, including the well-known peaks of Tawache, Everest, Nuptse, Lhotse, Ama Dablam, and Thamserku. Tenzing Norgay, the first man to reach the summit of Mount Everest with Sir Edmund Hillary, was born in the area in the village of Thani and was once sent to Tengboche Monastery to be a monk.

== History ==
The Khumbu valley, where Tengboche is located, came under the influence of Buddhism about 350 years ago. Ancient scriptures of Tibet refer to this valley along with Rowlang and Khanbalung valleys as sacred places. Lama Sangwa Dorje is referred to as the founder of the oldest monastery in Khumbu at Pangboche as well as many other small hermitages. His divine psychic knowledge and clairvoyant vision had prophesied suitability of establishing a monastery at Tengboche based on a foot print on a rock left by him while meditating. However, the actual establishment of the monastery happened only during Ngawang Tenzin Norbu's time; Norbu was considered to be Sangwa Dorje's fifth incarnation. He had established a monastery at Rongbuk in Tibet on the northern face of Mount Everest. He blessed Chatang Chotar, known as Lama Gulu, to found the Tengboche monastery at Tengboche village and as a result it got established at its present location in 1916. It is the first celibate monastery under the Nyingmapa lineage of the Vajrayana Buddhism. However, many older village level monasteries also exist close by.

Three wealthy inhabitants of the local Sherpa community are credited with funding building of the monastery. Among these three, Karma was the most influential and well known as he was a tax collector, and he also enjoyed the patronage of the Rana rulers of Nepal. It is also said that apart from Khumbu Sherpas, Sherung Sherpas have also been involved with building this monastery. Some of the village temples, chortens and smaller religious shrines are predated to 1880, particularly all the large chortens. The Mani wall, made of slabs of stone inscribed with prayers and sacred texts is dated to 1915.

The monastery of Tengboche and other buildings were destroyed during the 1934 earthquake. Subsequently, Lama Gulu who had built it also died. His successor, Umze Gelden, took up the task of rebuilding the monastery, with strong support from Ngawang Tenzin Norbu. The monks and the local community, with support from a skilled carpenter from Lhasa, re-established the monastery. Exclusive murals were painted by Kappa Kalden, a renowned artist. With an influx of tourists to the Khumbu region, particularly for trekking by mountaineers, the monastery has received wide recognition. However, the monastery's precious old scriptures, statues, murals and wood carvings were destroyed in the devastating fire caused by an electrical short circuit on January 19, 1989. The monumental stone credited with Lama Sangwa Dorje's left footprint had also fractured. However, a few trekkers managed to salvage some books and paintings. It has since been completely rebuilt with money donated from all round the world.

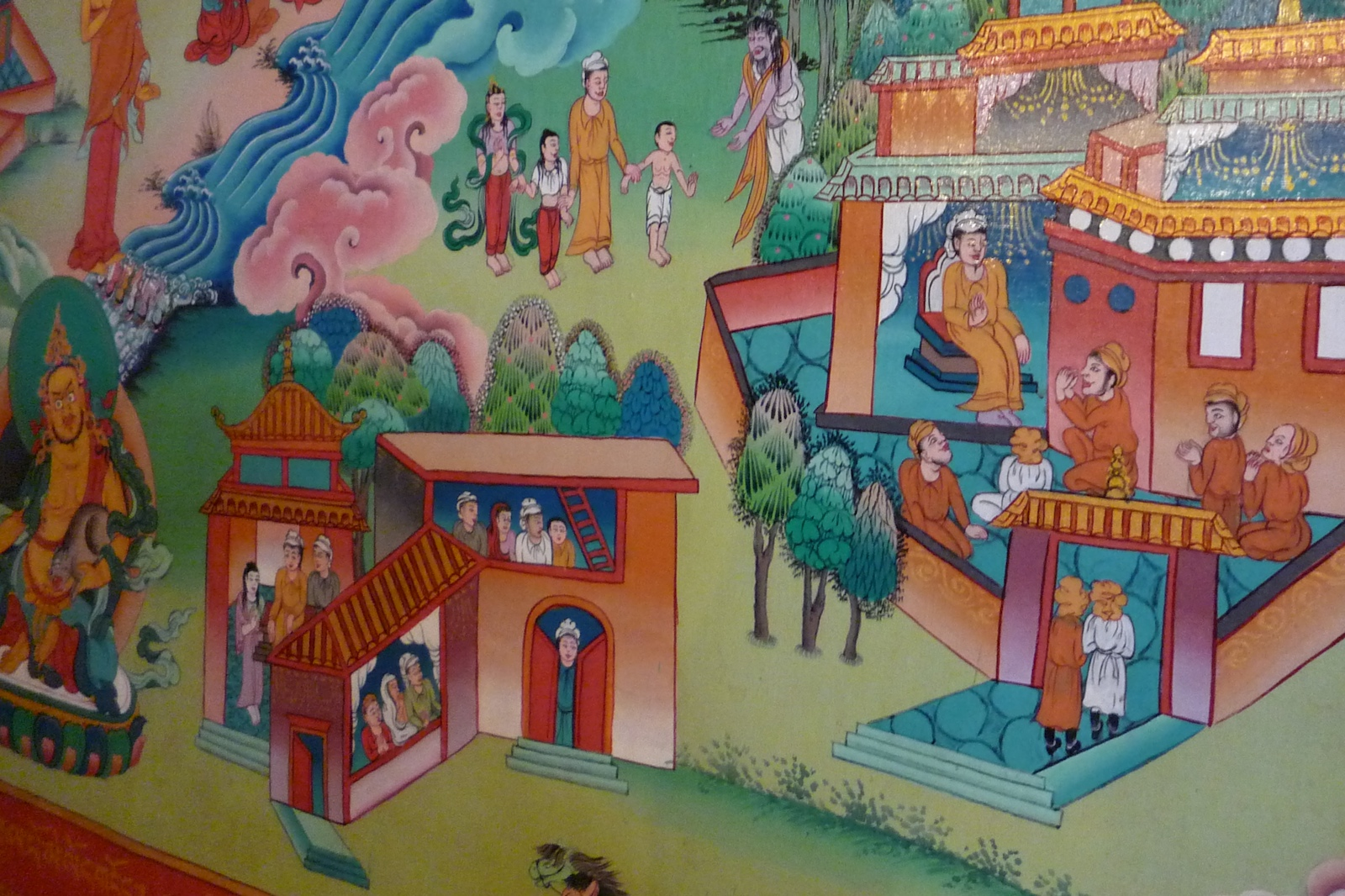
A restored painting in the monastery

Following the destruction of the monastery by fire, its rebuilding was undertaken by the present Nawang Tenzing Jangpo who is considered as the incarnation of the founder Lama Gulu, an important spiritual leader of the Sherpas. He has established an equation with many trekkers and climbers of all denominations who visit the monastery, which has helped him in finding funds for restoration. With due diligence to the set religious practices, the monastery has been substantially rebuilt. Tibetan painter Tarke-la's wall paintings that display the Bodhisattvas or the Buddha decorate the sanctum. In addition, the monks and Sherpa community with help from the Sir Edmund Hillary and Himalayan Trust, the American Himalayan Foundation and many international well-wishers have put in their support in several ways.

Hillary and Tenzing Norgay, an inhabitant of this village, were the first to reach the summit of Mount Everest on the British 1953 expedition and thereafter this monastery has acquired more international interest, as it is on the route to the base camp of Everest for routes made via the Khumbu icefall and west ridge. Everest expeditioners visit the monastery to light candles and seek the blessings of gods for good health and safe mountaineering.

John Hunt, the leader of the 1953 expedition and one of the first mountaineers to visit the monastery (most, but not all, previous expeditions approached the mountain from the northern (Tibetan) side), offered the following description of Thengboche in The Ascent of Everest:

Thyangboche must be one of the most beautiful places in the world. The height is well over 12,000 feet. The Monastery buildings stand upon a knoll at the end of a big spur, which is flung out across the direct axis of the Imja river. Surrounded by satellite dwellings, all quaintly constructed and oddly mediaeval in appearance, it provides a grandstand beyond comparison for the finest mountain scenery that I have ever seen, whether in the Himalaya or elsewhere.

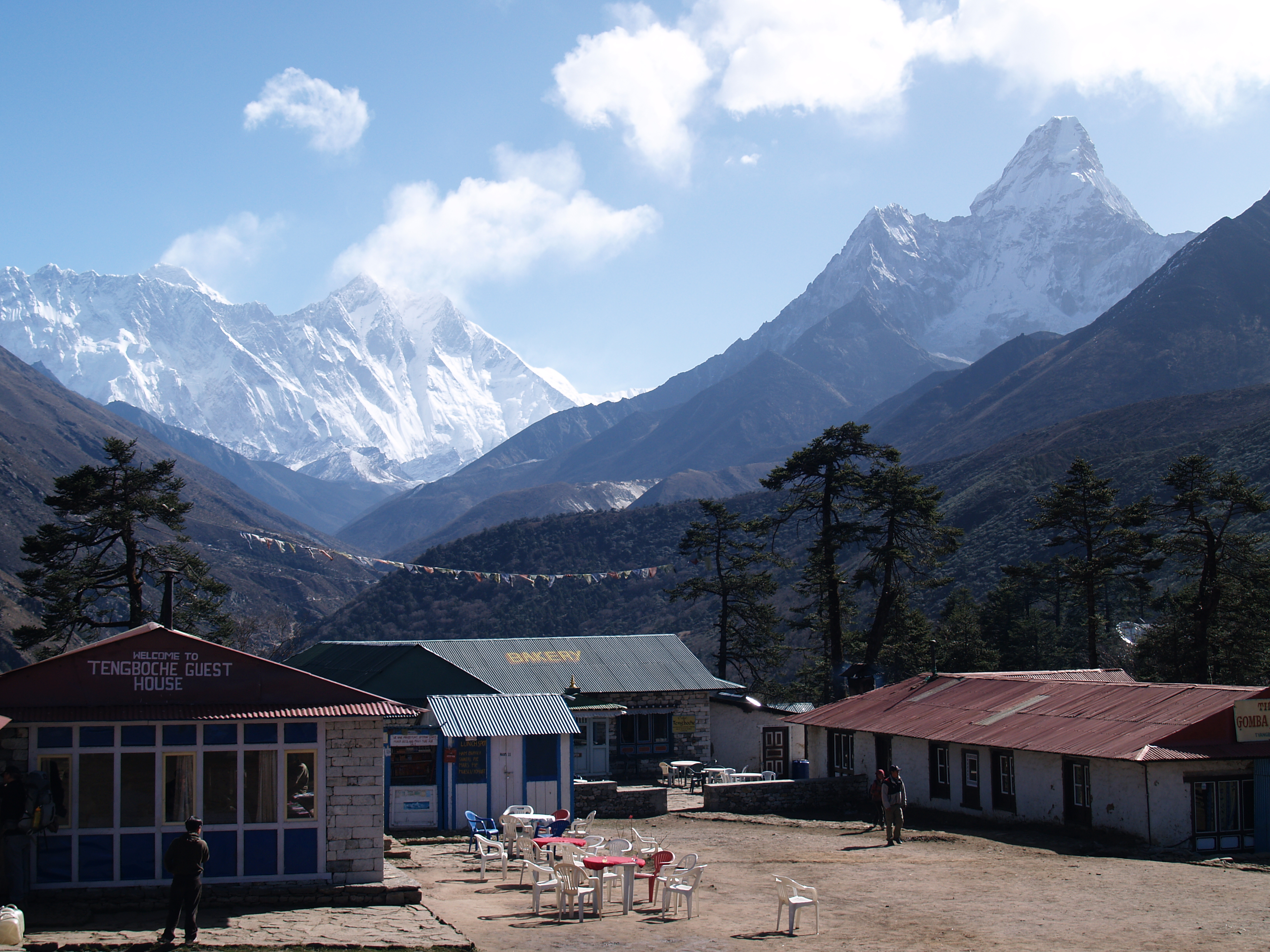
Everest (left), Lhotse (centre) and Ama Dablam (right) from Tengboche

The rebuilt monastery was formally consecrated in 1993 and is considered as the gateway to Mount Everest. The religious room of the Guru Rimpoche in the monastery was fully restored in September 2008. The entrance gate has also been rebuilt with funds provided by the Greater Himalayas Foundation based in Washington, D.C., United States.

The monastery is now said to be home to 60 monks, reflecting its financial prosperity. However, it is also said that fewer and fewer young boys join as monks as they prefer to work in mountaineering or trekking-related activities.

English adventurer Charlie Boorman and Peter Hillary, son of Edmund Hillary visited the village in 2008. The footage was shown in Boorman's series By Any Means.

== Geography and climate ==
Tengboche is located on a hill at the confluence of the Dudh Kosi and the Imja Khola rivers. It lies in Solukhumbu district to the north east of Kathmandu on the Nepal – Tibet border. It is inhabited by sherpas ('sherpa' literally means the easterner) who migrated from Tibet six hundred years ago. It is approached by a mountain trail from Namche, the nearest airport in Lukla (2,800 metres (9,200 ft)) connecting to Kathmandu. It is about two days of trekking from Lukla. However, considering acclimatization needs for the high altitude climbing, a four-day trekking is generally preferred. This trail crosses initially the Dudh Kosi (3,250 metres (10,660 ft)) river and a further climb leads to the Tengboche monastery at 3,870 metres (12,700 ft) altitude. However, a down hill trek leads to Devouche, the nunnery. During the winter, the snow peaks of Ama Dablam, the tip of the Everest that glows from the Nuptse ridge and several other peaks form a picturesque landscape.

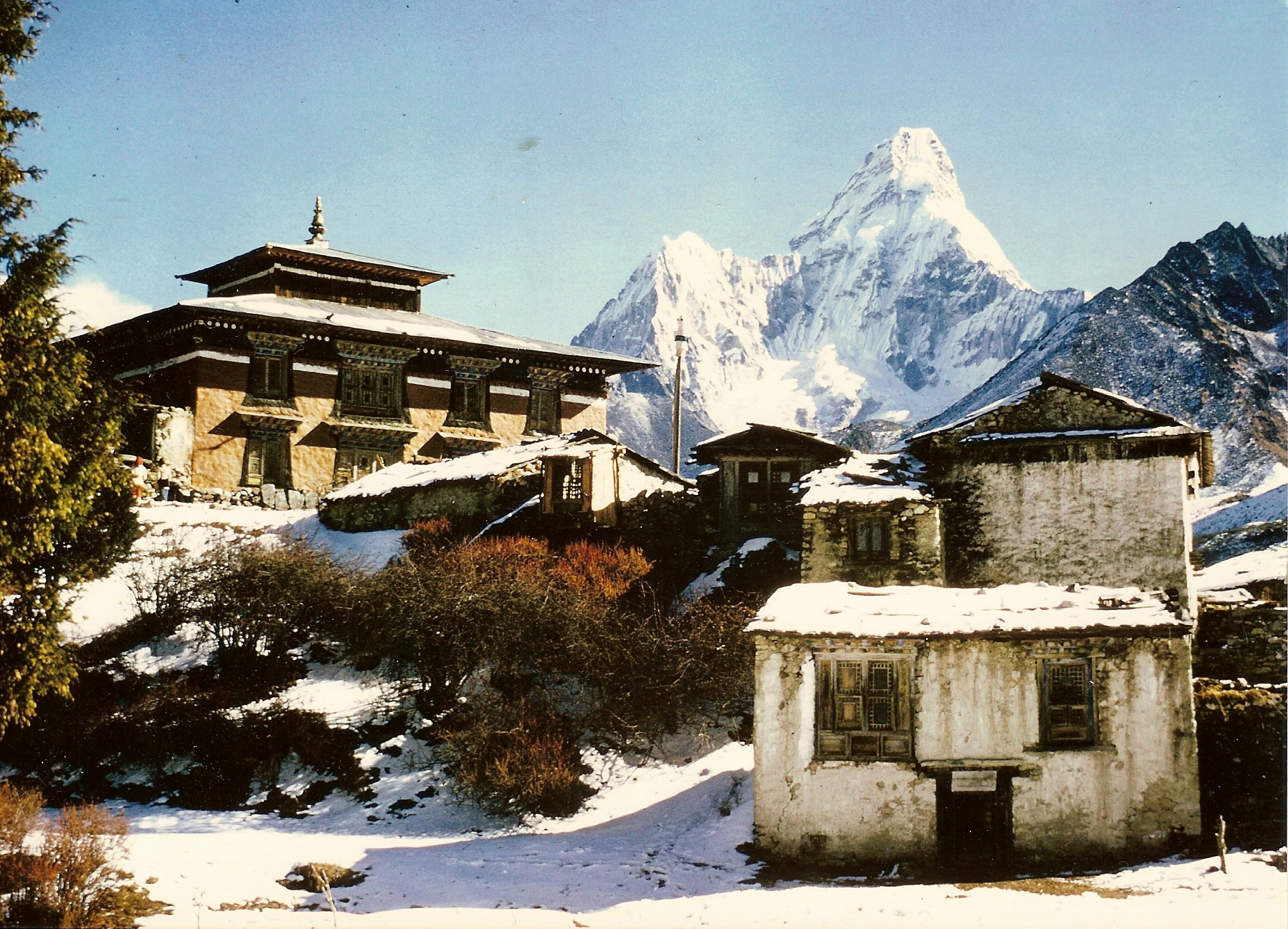
Tengboche in 1974

Tengboche is a midway station on the trail to the base camp for the mountain climbers of Mount Everest and other peaks of over 8,000 metres (26,000 ft) elevation; all these areas form part of the entire Khumbu region up to Tibet border with an area of 1,148 square kilometres (443 mi^{2}) encompassing Sagarmatha National Park. In the Khumbu region of Nepal, the monastery is strategically placed on the way to Everest base camp and thus attracts large number of tourists from all parts of the world. During the spring season, hill slopes around Tengboche are covered with flowering rhododendrons.

=== Climate ===
Tengboche has a Subarctic climate (Köppen classification: Dwc) bordering on Tundra climate (ET). Summers are cool and wet, with significant rainfall, while winters are cold and dry. There is high diurnal temperature variation due to the high elevation.

Climate data for Tengboche, elevation 3,857 m (12,654 ft)
Month	Jan	Feb	Mar	Apr	May	Jun	Jul	Aug	Sep	Oct	Nov	Dec	Year
Mean daily maximum °C (°F)	3.7 (38.7)	4.0 (39.2)	8.0 (46.4)	12.1 (53.8)	13.8 (56.8)	14.6 (58.3)	14.1 (57.4)	14.1 (57.4)	13.0 (55.4)	12.0 (53.6)	8.1 (46.6)	6.0 (42.8)	10.3 (50.5)
Daily mean °C (°F)	−3.0 (26.6)	−2.8 (27.0)	−0.8 (30.6)	4.0 (39.2)	6.4 (43.5)	8.8 (47.8)	9.1 (48.4)	8.8 (47.8)	7.5 (45.5)	5.1 (41.2)	0.6 (33.1)	−0.7 (30.7)	3.6 (38.4)
Mean daily minimum °C (°F)	−9.7 (14.5)	−9.7 (14.5)	−6.1 (21.0)	−4.0 (24.8)	−1.2 (29.8)	3.2 (37.8)	4.3 (39.7)	3.5 (38.3)	2.2 (36.0)	−1.7 (28.9)	−6.9 (19.6)	−7.5 (18.5)	−2.8 (27.0)
Average precipitation mm (inches)	22.0 (0.87)	14.1 (0.56)	27.2 (1.07)	25.2 (0.99)	34.0 (1.34)	142.2 (5.60)	245.0 (9.65)	237.4 (9.35)	159.5 (6.28)	72.1 (2.84)	3.0 (0.12)	0.6 (0.02)	982.3 (38.69)
Source 1: FAO
Source 2: Australian National University

== Culture ==
=== Monastery ===
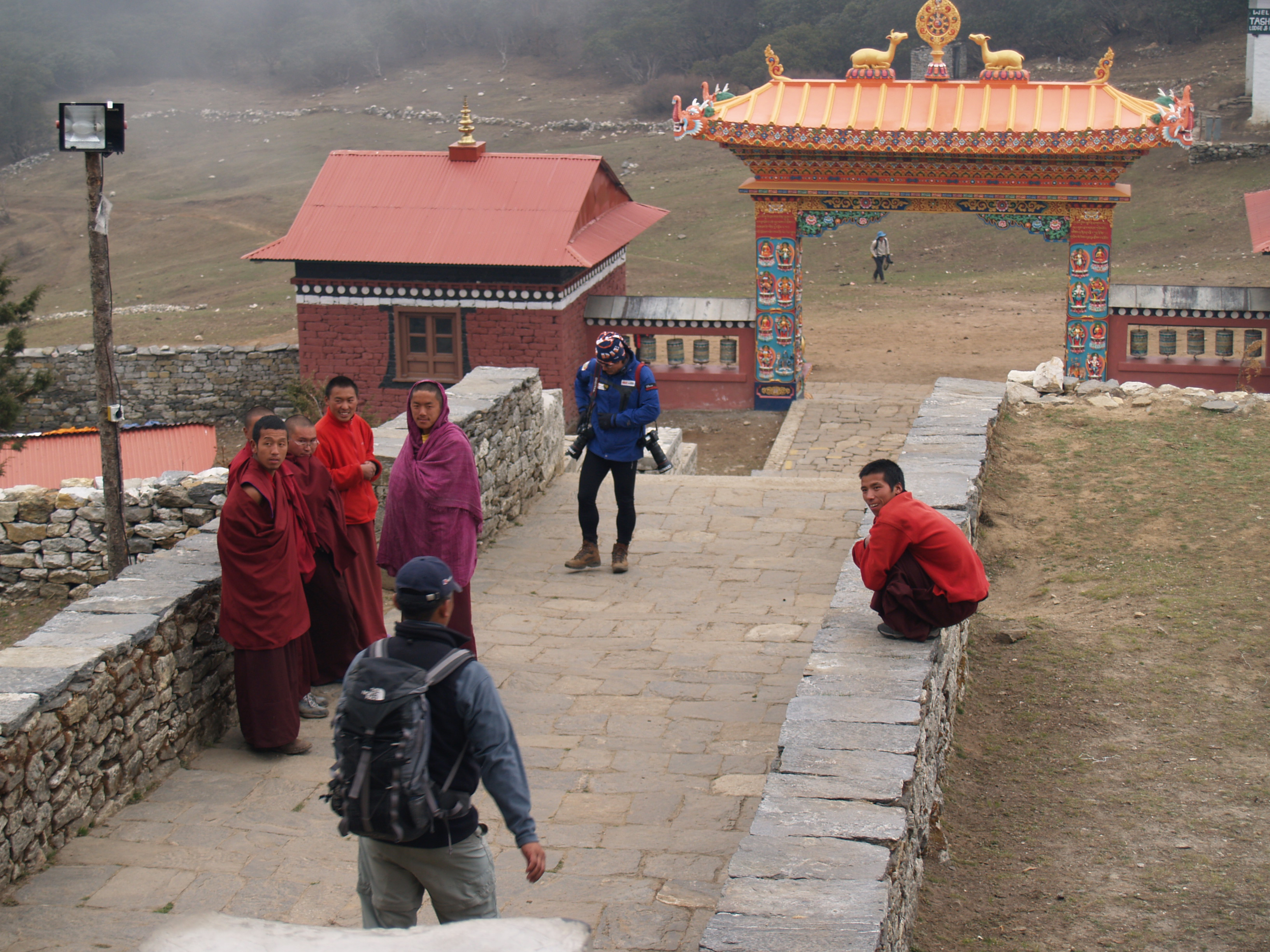
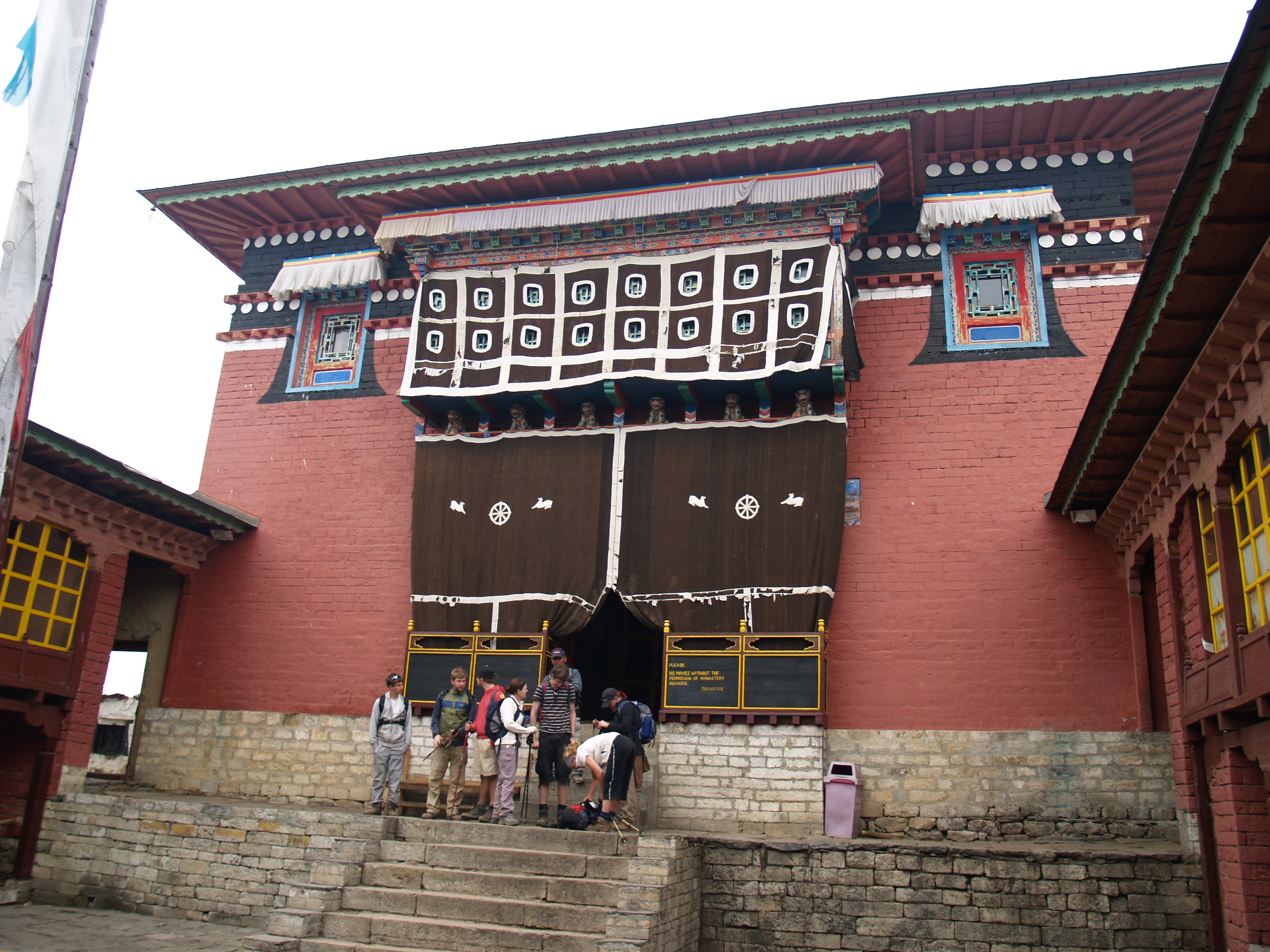
Left: Entrance to the monastery. Right: Tengboche Monastery

The current monastery is constructed with stone masonry. The courtyard and storerooms are large to facilitate the monks' religious rites and activities. The main building has the mandatory Dokhang, the prayer hall, where a large statue of Shakyamuni Buddha is deified. The statue extends to two floors of the monastery and encompasses the Ser sang lha khang, the first floor shrine room. Sakyamuni Buddha is flanked by Manjushri, the deity of wisdom and Maitreya and of the future Buddha. The scriptures of the Kangyur, the original teachings of the Buddha translated into Tibetan are also part of the sanctum.

The rebuilt monastery is large with a camping area in its front and a number of lodges. Tengboche is surrounded by ancient mani stones (flat stones inscribed with the mantra, "Om Mane Padme Hum"), prayer flags flying atop the high peaks (flags are flown in 5 colours denoting the five Buddhist elements: earth, wind, fire, water and consciousness. Tengboche is also the terminus site of the "Sacred Sites Trail Project" of the Sagarmatha National Park that attracts large number of tourists for trekking and mountaineering. It is a circular trail that covers 10 monasteries in a clockwise direction terminating in the Tengboche Monastery.

A small nunnery, administered by the Tengboche, named Devoche or Debuche Nunnery is also located in the area.

Mani Rimdu is a Buddhist festival observed every year in Everest Region, usually in November (date fixed by lunar calendar) in Tengboche monastery. This is the festival of Sherpa people celebrated during the autumn at Tengboche Monastery in the Everest region. Lamas and Sherpa gather at the monastery for five days – ‘for the good of the world’. One can witness different kinds of acts, plays, masked dances, prayers and feasts. Demons are quelled and the pious are rewarded.

Mani Rimdu is a re-creation of legendary events; the establishment of Buddhism in Tibet by the great saint, Guru Rimpoche (Padmasambhava). Through the dances, symbolic demons are conquered, dispelled, or converted to Dharma Protectors, as positive forces clash with those of chaos. The dances convey Buddhist teachings on many levels – from the simplest to the most profound – for those who do not have the opportunity to study and meditate extensively.

=== Cultural centre ===
Tengboche and the Tengboche Monastery complex built around the village are considered the oldest Sherpa celibate monastery. Sherpas (Sherpas are Tibetans who migrated from Tibet and settled in this region of Nepal about 450 years ago) who form the main social community of the region were a pastoral, agricultural and trading community. However, with closing of the border with China in 1960 in response to a refugee influx, the trading activity with Nepal ceased resulting in changes in the living style of the Sherpas. They adapted to mountaineering and tourism activity as result of large influx of trekkers from various parts of the world. The Sherpas found it an economically attractive vocation. This forced them to remain away from their village and community for 8 months in year, changed their life styles resulting in erosion of their traditional arts and culture. The head lama of the Tengboche Monastery and other community members therefore established a 'Cultural Center' at Tengboche to strengthen the social and cultural values of the Sherpas. The Center, set up with community participation, was built in traditional Sherpa style. The Centre has a Museum/Library, which has rare sacred Buddhist texts and artefacts, crafts and clothing (donated by community members) and also the Monks' Residence.

== Economy ==
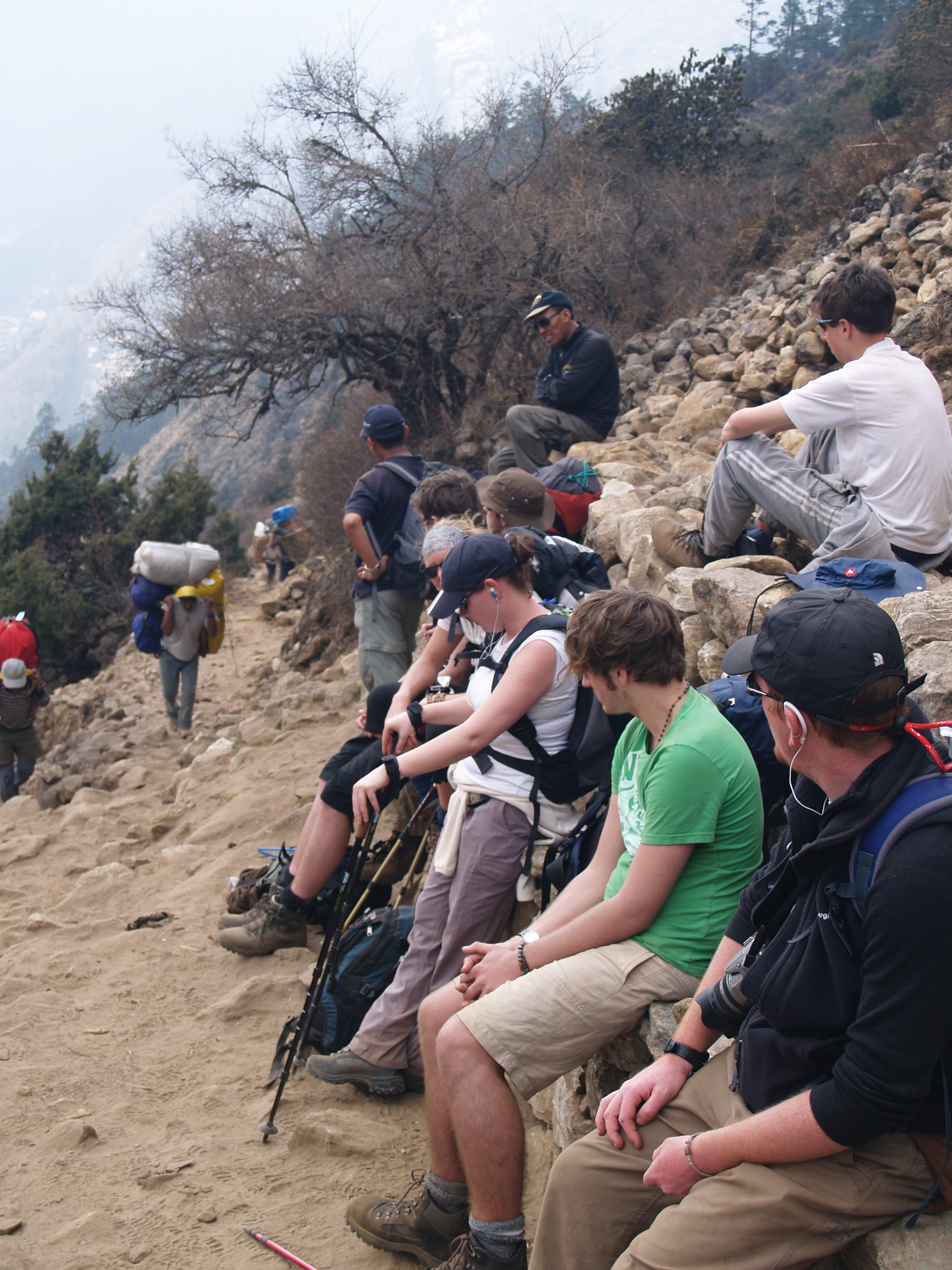
Trekkers in Tengboche

Tengboche has no road network, approach is only by trekking and consequently the living conditions in the village are abnormally expensive. Many tourists visit the village as part of their trekking route and it provides the main approach to the base camp for the national and international mountaineering community who trek to Mt. Everest and other mountains in the Kumbu region. It is reported that only 50 monks and five families permanently live in the Tengboche village. However, in the short span of 5 tourist months, thousands of tourists and trekkers visit (25,000 tourists were reported during 1999) the Sagarmatha National Park and village has numerous buildings of accommodation for guests. On their way to the high altitude trekking, it is recommended tourists spend two days in Tengboche for acclimatization before undertaking the High altitude trekking or mountaineering to the Himalayan peaks. Consequently, this puts heavy burden on the village community and on the Monastery administration, particularly on the meagre facilities of water, electricity, food and sanitation available in the village.

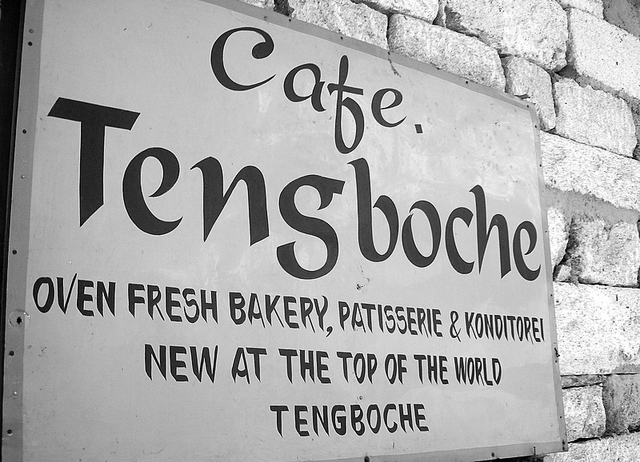
Cafe Tengboche

To improve the economy of the village and the Tengboche Monastic community, a practical solution has been evolved by setting up the Tengboche Development Project, which concentrates on the services to be provided in Tengboche, more used by the tourists, such as water and sanitation. To sustain the economic conditions in the village, which largely caters to the trekkers from various parts of the world, tourists and trekkers have been urged to offer donations to the Tengboche Development Project. Funds made available would enable employing the local people in various development activities. However, help in respect of special skills such as in the Eco-Center or medical herb plantation activities would still be required. Sherpas (meaning the "easterner"), form the majority community in the village and in the Kumbu region, and they are closely involved in the form of support services for mountaineering in the region following the first successful expedition of one of their community Tenzing Norgay to the Mt. Everest Peak along with Edmund Hillary.

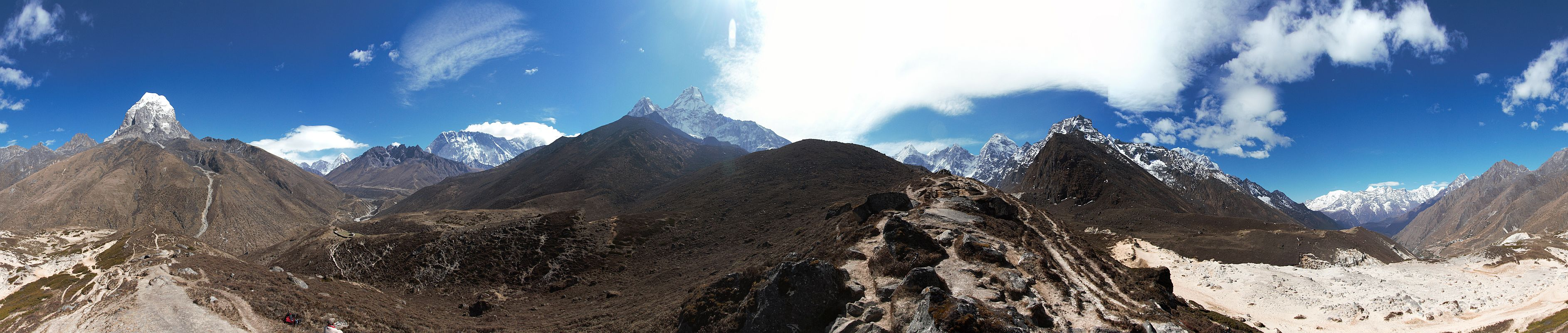
A panoramic view from Everest Base Camp (altitude of 5,364 metres (17,598 ft)) - Tengboche to Dingboche
