= Island Peak =

Mountain in Khumbu, Nepal

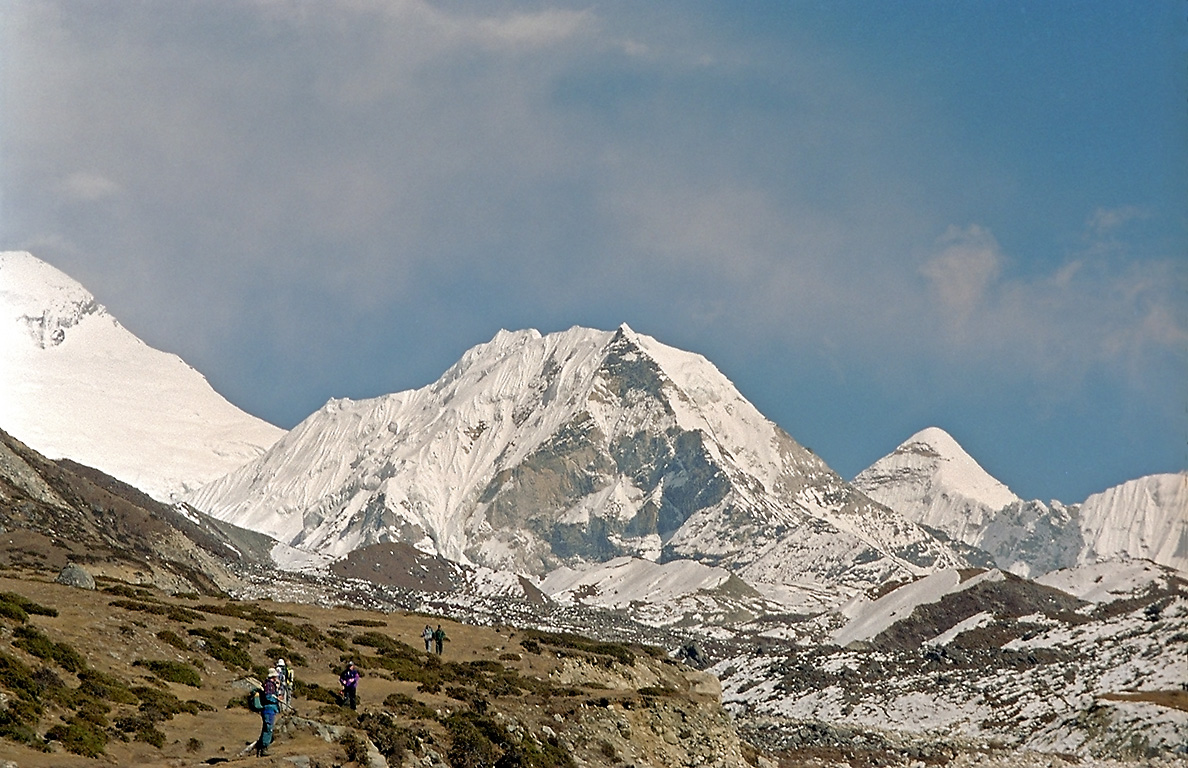
- An island in a sea of ice

Highest point
- Elevation: 6,165 m (20,226 ft)
- Prominence: 475 m (1,558 ft)
- Listing: Mountains of Nepal
- Coordinates: 27°55′15″N 86°56′07″E

Naming
- Native name: इम्जा छे (Nepali); Imja Tse (Nepali)

Geography
- Location within Nepal
- Country: Nepal
- Region: Khumbu
- District: Solukhumbu
- Protected area: Sagarmatha National Park
- Parent range: Khumbu Himal

Climbing
- First ascent: 1956 by Hans-Rudolf Von Gunten and 2 unknown Sherpas
- Easiest route: North Ridge PD+ glacier/scrambling/ice climbing

Island Peak (Nepali: इम्जा छे, Imja Tse) is a mountain in Sagarmatha National Park in the Himalayas of eastern Nepal. The peak was named Island Peak in 1953 by members of the British Mount Everest expedition because it appears as an island in a sea of ice when viewed from Dingboche. The peak was later renamed in 1983 to Imja Tse but Island Peak remains the popular choice. The peak is actually an extension of the ridge coming down off the south end of Lhotse Shar.

The southwest summit of Imja Tse was first climbed in 1953 as part of a training exercise by a British expedition that went on to summit Mount Everest. The team that climbed Imja Tse comprised Tenzing Norgay, Charles Evans, Alfred Gregory, Charles Wylie and seven other Sherpas. The main summit was first climbed in 1956 by Hans-Rudolf Von Gunten and two unknown Sherpas, members of a Swiss team that went on to make the second ascent of Everest and the first ascent of Lhotse.

== Climbing route ==
To climb Island Peak, one has the option of starting from a base camp at 5,087 metres (16,690 ft) called Pareshaya Gyab and starting the climb between 2 and 3 A.M. Another popular option is to ascend to High Camp at around 5,600 metres (18,400 ft) to reduce the amount of effort and time needed for summit day. However, an adequate water supply and concerns about sleeping at a higher altitude may dictate starting from base camp. Base camp to high camp is basically a hike but just above high camp, some rocky steps require moderate scrambling up through a broad open gully. At the top of the gully, glacier travel begins and proceeds up a steep snow and ice slope. From here, fixed ropes may be set up by the guides for the strenuous ascent of nearly 100 metres (330 ft) to the summit ridge. The climb to the summit is somewhat difficult due to steep climbing. On top, while Mount Everest is a mere ten kilometres away to the north, the view is blocked by the massive wall of Lhotse, towering 2,300 m (7,500 ft) above the summit.

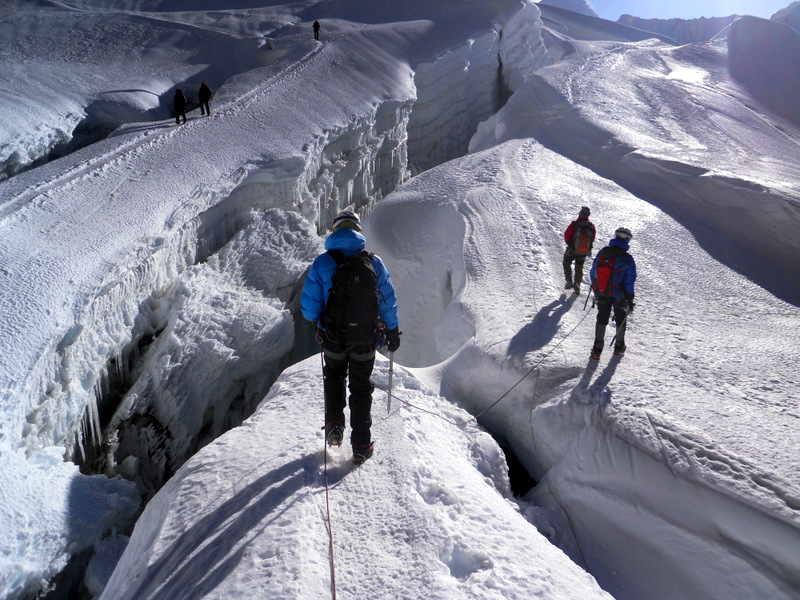
Negotiating crevasses in snowfield along the route to the summit of Imja Tse.

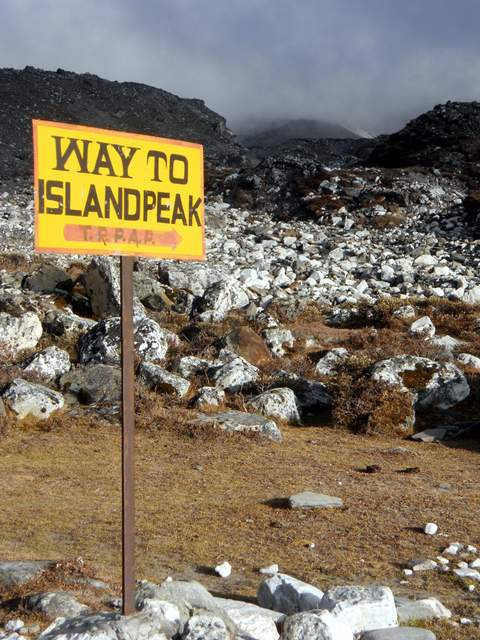
Sign indicating the route to Imja Tse high camp.

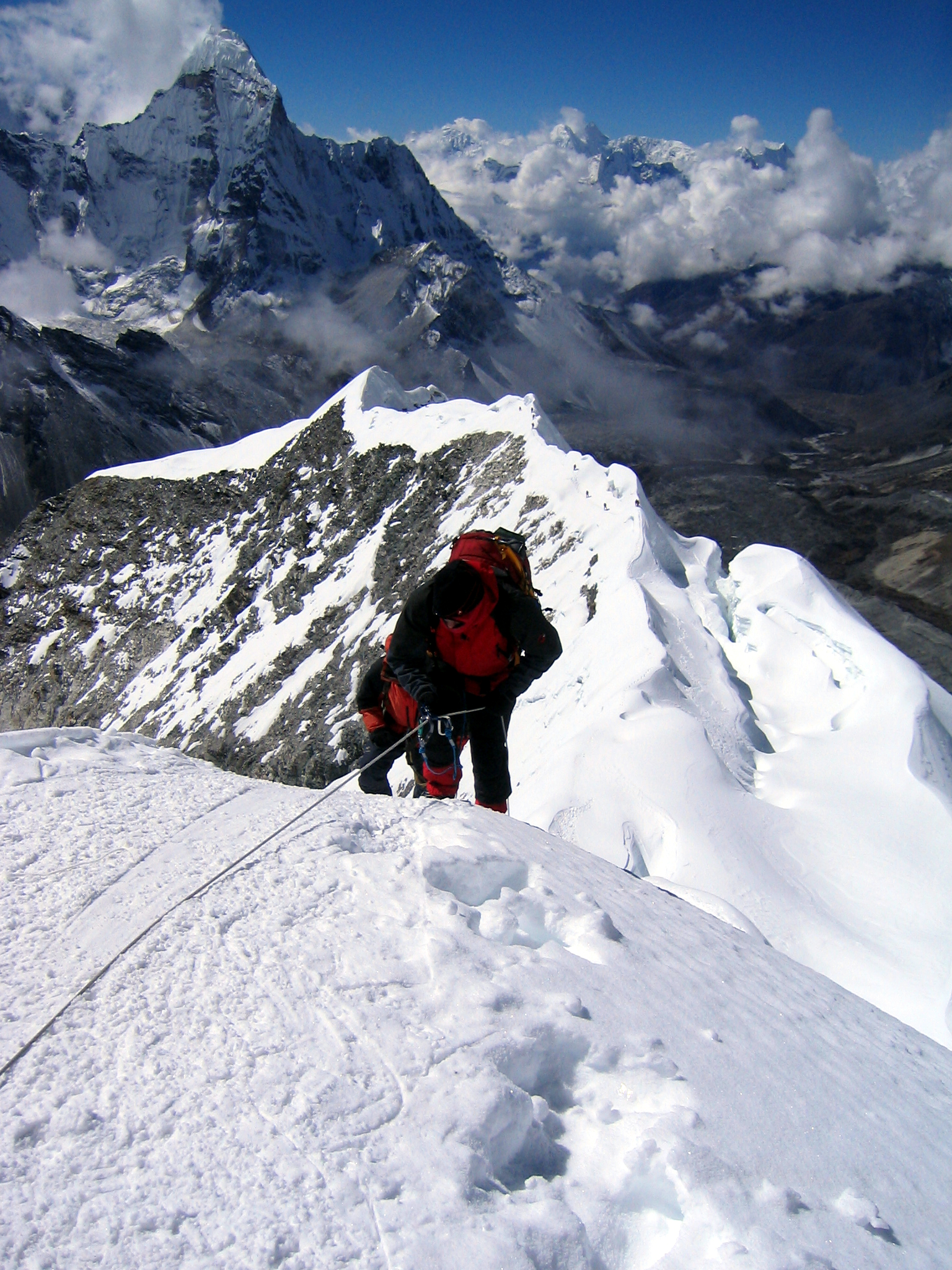
Climber taking the final few steps onto the 6,165 m (20,226 ft) summit of Imja Tse (Island Peak) in Nepal, 2004

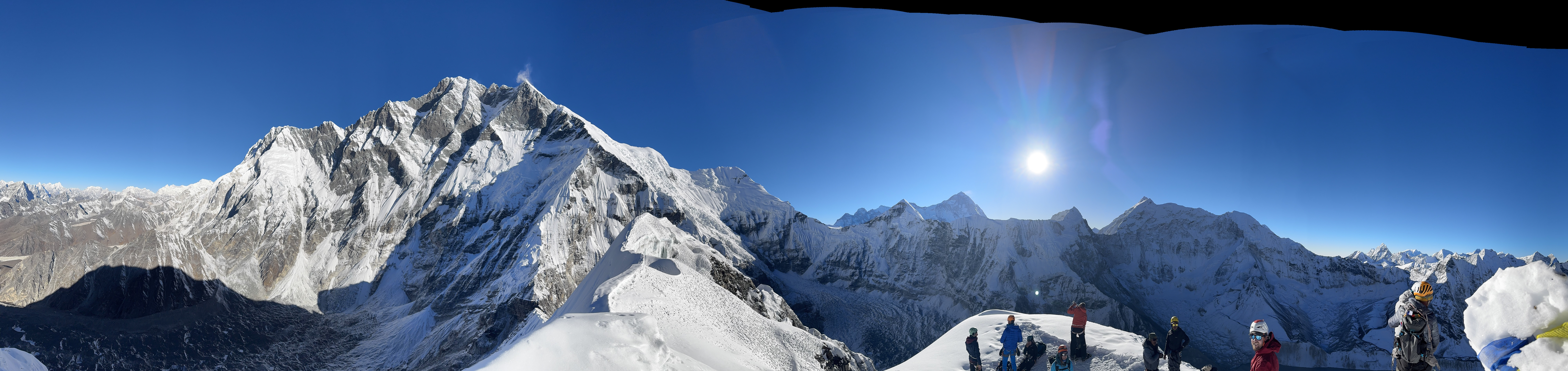
The summit of Island Peak November 8th 2024

=== Headwall crevasse ===
A substantial crevasse along most of the headwall leading to the summit ridge has sometimes caused teams to turn back. In April 2009, the Nepal Mountaineering Association tasked the Nepal Mountaineering Instructors' Association with installing stairs (ladders) at the crevasse. As of the 2016 fall climbing season, a 5-metre high fixed aluminum ladder is being used to cross the crevasse.

== See also ==
- Imja Glacier
- Imja Tsho
