= Dingboche =

Sherpa village in Khumbu, Nepal

Dingboche दिङबोचे
- VDC
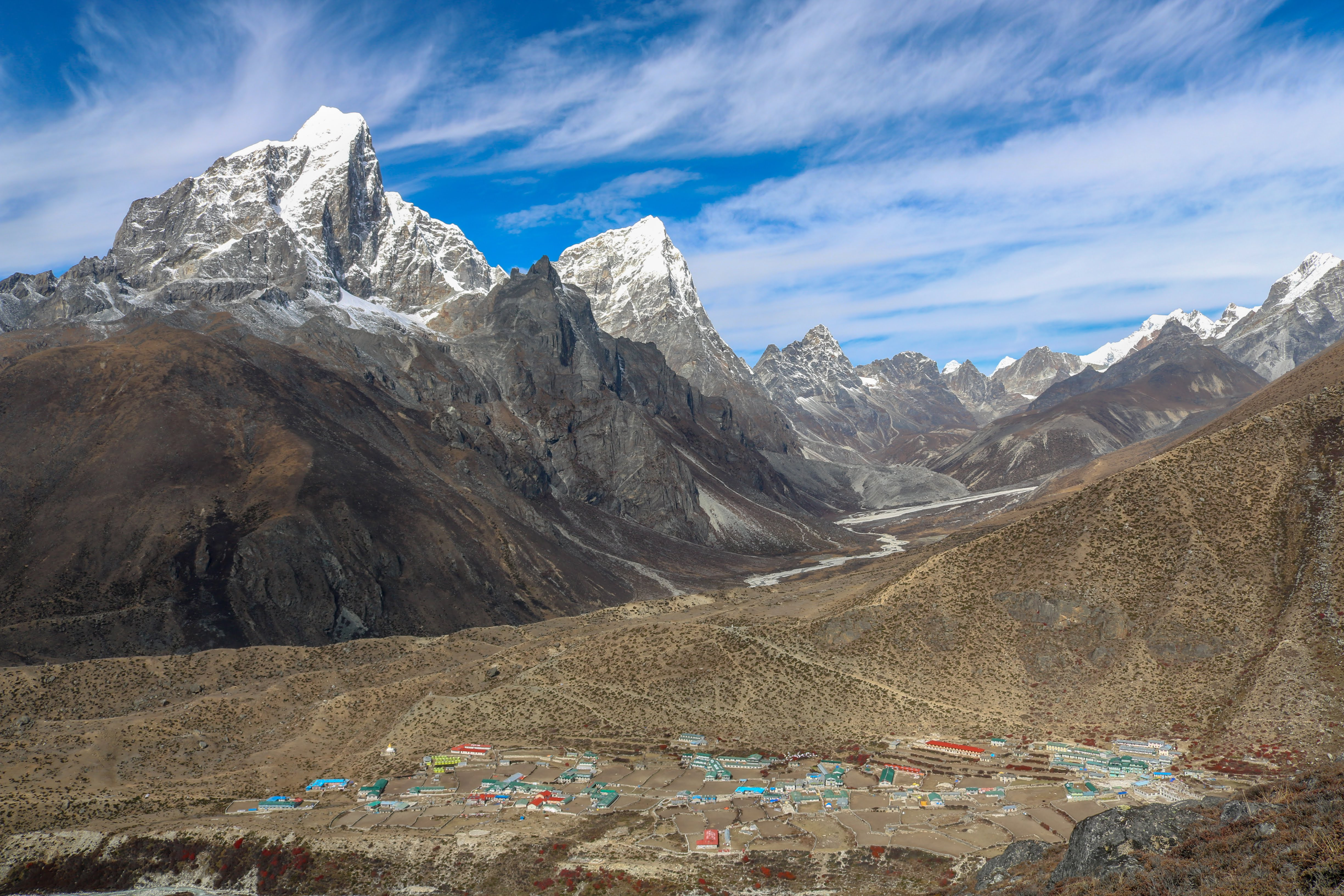
- Dingboche Village

- Location in Nepal Dingboche (Nepal)
- Coordinates: 27°53′N 86°49′E
- Country: Nepal
- Province: Province No. 1
- District: Solukhumbu District
- Elevation: 4,410 m (14,470 ft)
- Time zone: UTC+5:45 (Nepal Standard Time)
- Postal code: 56002
- Area code: 038

Dingboche is a Sherpa village at an elevation of 4,410 m (14,470 ft) in the Khumbu region of northeastern Nepal. Its population was estimated at 200 in 2011.

== Transport ==
Coming from Namche Bazaar or Tengboche, Dingboche is the better alternative than the village of Pheriche, in being more sunny, and less affected by the icy winds that descend through the Valley of Khumbu. There are no roads that go to the village, only trails, and with the exceptions of some agricultural products produced around the village; yaks and mules carry most of what is consumed locally. Helicopter flight is the faster option to reach at Dingboche. Dingboche Helipad is a high-altitude helicopter landing point located at around 4,410 metres above sea level. It serves Dingboche village by heli connectivity.

== Climate ==
Dingboche has a Tundra climate (Köppen classification ET). It has cool and rainy summers and dry and cold winters, affected mainly by its altitude and by monsoon in the summer. For those interested in trekking, spring (March and April) and autumn (October and November) are the ideal times because the visibility of the mountains is ideal and the temperature is not too cold. During the winter it is possible to trek, but the vast majority of places of accommodation are closed and the cold is intense, rarely above freezing point.

=== History ===
It is believed that Dingboche is the village where Sir Edmund Hillary and Tenzing Norgy Sherpa first started their excursion. Together, they were the pioneers of Everest exploration and voyages.

Climate data for Dingboche
Month	Jan	Feb	Mar	Apr	May	Jun	Jul	Aug	Sep	Oct	Nov	Dec	Year
Mean daily maximum °C (°F)	1.0 (33.8)	1.5 (34.7)	4.7 (40.5)	8.5 (47.3)	11.1 (52.0)	13.7 (56.7)	13.0 (55.4)	12.6 (54.7)	11.5 (52.7)	8.9 (48.0)	5.3 (41.5)	3.2 (37.8)	7.9 (46.3)
Daily mean °C (°F)	−7.2 (19.0)	−6.4 (20.5)	−2.9 (26.8)	0.7 (33.3)	3.8 (38.8)	7.4 (45.3)	7.9 (46.2)	7.4 (45.3)	5.9 (42.6)	1.8 (35.2)	−2.9 (26.8)	−5.1 (22.8)	0.9 (33.6)
Mean daily minimum °C (°F)	−15.3 (4.5)	−14.2 (6.4)	−10.5 (13.1)	−7.0 (19.4)	−3.5 (25.7)	1.1 (34.0)	2.9 (37.2)	2.3 (36.1)	0.3 (32.5)	−5.3 (22.5)	−11.0 (12.2)	−13.4 (7.9)	−6.1 (21.0)
Average precipitation mm (inches)	9 (0.4)	8 (0.3)	12 (0.5)	13 (0.5)	16 (0.6)	64 (2.5)	140 (5.5)	151 (5.9)	71 (2.8)	31 (1.2)	2 (0.1)	3 (0.1)	520 (20.4)
Source: climate-data.org
