= McKinnon =

McKinnon, MacKinnon or Mackinnon is a Scottish surname. (Gaelic: Mac Fhionghain),

Notable people with this surname include:

- Allan McKinnon (1917–1990), Canadian politician, MP – Victoria 1972-1988
- Alexander "Alex" McKinnon (1895–1949), Canadian professional hockey forward
- Alexander J. McKinnon (1856–1887) American Major League Baseball first baseman
- Angus MacKinnon, Scottish footballer (Queen's Park, Scotland)
- Angus McKinnon (1886–1968), Scottish footballer (Arsenal)
- Angus McKinnon Young (born 1955), Australian Lead Guitarist of band AC/DC and co-founder of AC/DC
- Atholl McKinnon (1932–1983), South African cricketer
- Barry McKinnon (born 1944), Canadian poet
- Betty McKinnon (1925–1981), Australian sprinter, silver medal – 4 x 100 metre relay – 1948 Summer Olympics in London
- Bill or Billy Mackinnon, several people
- Bob MacKinnon, American basketball coach
- Bob MacKinnon Jr. (born 1960), American basketball coach
- Casey McKinnon (born 1978), Canadian producer & star of Galacticast
- Catharine MacKinnon, American feminist (born 1946)
- Catherine McKinnon (born 1944), Canadian actress and folk & pop singer
- Cedric McKinnon (1968–2016), American football player
- Clinton "Bär" McKinnon (born 1969) American saxophone musician in Melbourne, Australia
- Clinton Dotson McKinnon (1906–2001) American politician
- Colin Francis MacKinnon, (1810–1879), Canadian Roman Catholic Archbishop
- Dan Mackinnon, (1903–1983), Australian politician
- Dan A. McKinnon III (1939–2003), justice of the New Mexico Supreme Court
- Dave MacKinnon, Scottish professional football player
- David MacKinnon (born 1994), American baseball player
- Dennis Lewis McKinnon (born 1961), professional American NFL football player
- Don McKinnon (disambiguation), several people, including:
  - Don McKinnon (born 1939), New Zealand politician
  - Donnie McKinnon (born 1940), Scottish footballer
- Donald MacKinnon (disambiguation), several people, including:
  - Donald Alexander MacKinnon (1863–1928), Canadian teacher, lawyer, politician and author
  - Donald Mackinnon (1859–1932), Australian politician
  - Donald W. MacKinnon (1903–1987), American psychologist
- Ellen MacKinnon (1926–2001), Canadian politician
- Esther Blaikie MacKinnon (1885–1934), Scottish artist
- Francis MacKinnon (1848–1947), British cricketer
- Frank Douglas MacKinnon (1871–1946), English lawyer, judge and writer
- Frank McKinnon (1934–2015), Canadian sports executive
- Fred McKinnon (b. 196?), American basketball player
- Gary McKinnon (born 1966), British computer hacker
- George Edward MacKinnon (1906–1995), American politician
- Gillies MacKinnon, Scottish film director
- Glen McKinnon (born 1937), Canadian educator and Liberal Party politician
- Harry McKinnon (1910–1989), Australian rugby league footballer and administrator
- Hector McKinnon CC, CMG (1891–1981) Canadian government civil servant
- James MacKinnon (disambiguation), several people
- Jana McKinnon, Australian actress, plays the lead role in 2023 TV series Bad Behaviour
- Janice MacKinnon (born 1947), Canadian historian
- John McKinnon (disambiguation), several people, including:
  - John Kenneth McKinnon (1936–2019), Canadian politician & Commissioner of the Yukon (1986–1995)
  - John McKinnon (ophthalmologist) (born 1938), New Zealand mountaineer and ophthalmologist
  - John Walter McKinnon (born 1950), New Zealand diplomat and public servant
  - Johnny McKinnon (1902–1969), Canadian professional NHL hockey player
- Jon MacKinnon, Canadian field hockey player
- Kate McKinnon (born 1984), comedian
- Lachlan Mackinnon, Scottish poet, critic and literary journalist
- Sir Lachlan Mackinnon (clan chief), 17th century chief of the Clan Mackinnon
- Leila McKinnon (born 1972), Australian TV reporter
- Marguerite McKinnon (born 1970), Australian journalist
- Malcolm McKinnon (born 1950), New Zealand historian
- Mark McKinnon (born 1955), adviser to President George W. Bush
- McKay McKinnon, American plastic surgeon
- Murdock MacKinnon (1865–1944), Canadian politician
- Nathan MacKinnon (born 1995), Canadian hockey player
- Neil Mackinnon, 17th century minister in the Isle of Skye
- Peter MacKinnon, Canadian lawyer and academic
- Quintin McKinnon, New Zealand explorer
- Randolph McKinnon, (1917 - 2006), Canadian Politician
- Rebecca MacKinnon, American journalist
- Roderick MacKinnon, Nobel laureate
- Ronald McKinnon (American football) (born 1973), American football
- Ronnie McKinnon (1940–2023), Scottish footballer for Rangers and Scotland
- Ross McKinnon, Australian rugby league player
- Ruby McKinnon, Canadian singer, stage name Flower Face
- Rylind MacKinnon (born 2000), Canadian ice hockey player
- Sam Mackinnon, Australian basketball player
- Sandy McKinnon, fictional character
- Simmone Jade Mackinnon, Australian actress
- Stuart McKinnon (1938–2022), British judge
- Wade McKinnon (born 1981) Australian NRL rugby player
- Walter McKinnon (1910–1998), senior officer in the New Zealand Army
- William Mackinnon (disambiguation), several people

== See also ==
- Clan MacKinnon, Scottish clan
- McKinnon (disambiguation) – other uses
