= Everest Link =

Internet service provider in Everest region

- Company type: Private limited company
- Industry: Telecommunications
- Founded: 2014
- Founder: Tsering Gyaltsen Sherpa
- Headquarters: Kathmandu, Nepal
- Area served: Khumbu region, Everest Base Camp
- Key people: Suresh Lama, Pasang Wongde
- Services: Broadband Internet access
- Website: everestlink.com.np

Everest Link is an internet service provider founded in 2014 that provides high-speed internet and Wi-Fi in the remote Everest Region. It is the only internet provider at the Everest Base Camp, located at a height of 5,380m (17,600 feet), making it the world's highest internet service. Before Everest Link was set up at the Base Camp, climbers solely relied on satellite phones for communication.

The service has also helped the inhabitants of some of the remotest villages in the region to connect with the outside world. Everest Link's projects such as "Hello Doctor" provide free online medical consultations to anyone in the Khumbu region, where medical facilities are scarce. Currently, the network, comprising 36 towers, exclusively relies on solar power and covers the region between Lukla and the Base Camp.

The Everest Link Company has launched Everest Link Card that keeps the trekkers in the Everest region connected while they are on the Trek. The price for Everest Link Card is $20 for 10GB of data with 30 days of Validity. The 20GB data cost $30 with 30 days of Validity. This card has to be used while you are on a trek to Everest Region, Mera Region, Upper Mustang Region, and Langtang Region. Trekkers to Everest can buy these cards at Sales stations at Kathmandu, Lukla, Namche Bazaar, Dingboche, and Gokyo. Or, it can be brought to the local lodges where you stay or through your travel agent to Nepal.
