= John McKinnon =

John McKinnon may refer to:

- John McKinnon (diplomat) (born 1950), New Zealand diplomat and public servant
- John McKinnon (Nova Scotia politician, born 1832) (1832–1907), Nova Scotia politician
- John McKinnon (Nova Scotia politician, born 1808) (1808–1892), political figure in Nova Scotia
- John J. McKinnon (1847–1884), his son, Nova Scotia politician
- John Kenneth McKinnon (1936–2019), Canadian politician
- Johnny McKinnon (1902–1969), Canadian ice hockey player
- John McKinnon (ophthalmologist) (born 1939), New Zealand mountaineer and Kunde Hospital volunteer

== See also ==
- Jon MacKinnon (born 1977), field hockey goalkeeper
