= The Duke of Edinburgh's Hillary Award =

The Duke of Edinburgh's Hillary Award, also known as The Duke of Edinburgh's Award, is a New Zealand award modelled on The Duke of Edinburgh's Award. The name of the award refers to New Zealand mountaineer Sir Edmund Hillary.

== Overview ==
The Duke of Edinburgh's Hillary Award is a voluntary, non-competitive programme of practical, cultural and adventurous activities, designed to support the personal and social development of young people aged 14–25, regardless of gender, background or ability. It offers an individual challenge and encourages young people to undertake exciting, constructive, challenging and enjoyable activities in their free time.

The mission of The Duke of Edinburgh's Hillary Award Programme in New Zealand is to have young people, regardless of cultural, ethnic and socio-economic background, participating in an individually tailored programme, to build skills, identity and self-esteem.

Approximately 9000 young New Zealanders undertake the award every year.

== History ==
The initial Duke of Edinburgh Award was founded in the United Kingdom in 1956 by HRH, the Duke of Edinburgh, Prince Philip, alongside Lord Hunt, leader of the first successful ascent of Mount Everest and Kurt Hahn, a German educationalist. They were also in close association with Edmund Hillary, who was also on the first ascent of Everest.

The constitution of the Award in New Zealand was drawn up on 19 July 1963 during the inaugural meeting of the National Council of The Duke of Edinburgh's Award in New Zealand held at Government House, Wellington.

The award was renamed from The Duke of Edinburgh's Award to Duke of Edinburgh's Hillary Award in 2009 following the death of Sir Edmund Hillary. It has also been known as The Young New Zealanders Challenge of the Duke of Edinburgh's Hillary Award.

Although commonly known as the Hillary Award, the Duke of Edinburgh Award in New Zealand (Aotearoa) is also known as the International Award and linked to the Duke of Edinburgh Award in the other countries where it is established.

== Elements of the award ==
The Award, following the same system as the Duke of Edinburgh Award, requires all participants to engage in physical activities, work in a team in a challenging environment, learn new skills and volunteer in their local community.

These are completed through the 4 sections of the Award with the appropriate examples:

1. Physical Recreation; running, swimming, tennis, netball.
2. Skills; playing a musical instrument, baking, knitting, gardening.
3. Service; volunteering at a non-for-profit rest home, environmental conservation work, scouts leader, surf lifesaving.
4. Adventurous Journey;
  - Exploration; exploring the natural world (geology, coastal studies), exploring human impact (pollution, environmental changes).
  - Expedition; hiking, cycling, sailing, paddling.

There are three main levels to the Award and each level is more challenging than the last, they include:

1. Bronze - minimum of 6 months to completion
  - The Bronze Award requires that all participants are 14 years or older and in order to complete the Award, they must finish 13 hours for each of the four sections with one hour a week and one major section, completing double the hours (26).
2. Silver - minimum of 6 months if participant previously completed 'Bronze', otherwise 12 months for first time entrants
  - The Silver Award requires the participant to be 15 years or older and complete 26 hours with one per week for each of the four sections.
3. Gold - minimum of 12 months if participant previously completed 'Silver', otherwise 18 months for first time entrants
  - The Gold Award is for participants 16 years or older and takes a minimum of 12 months complete (52 weeks) with one hour allowed to be logged per week. Gold participants must also complete a Residential Project which consists of 5 days and 4 nights away from home with others working towards a specific goal.

If a participant wishes to start their Silver or Gold Award without doing the previous Award(s), they must add an extra 6 months (26 weeks) to one section of their choice. Additionally, the participant must also complete additional training for their Adventurous Journey in order to qualify for the Award they're directly entering into.

The Award recognises the importance of setting goals and personal growth through achievements and grit. As a part of the Gold Award, participants must complete a residential project for 5 days and 4 nights away from home where they are working towards a common purpose with others. Some examples include staying and participating in a restoration project, language programme or being a camp leader for various organisations within New Zealand.

== Sir Edmund Hillary ==
Sir Edmund Hillary was born on the 20th of July, 1919 in Auckland, New Zealand. As a mountaineer, he participated in the first successful ascent of Mount Everest alongside Sir John Hunt, G.C. Band, Thomas Bourdillon, R.C. Evans, A. Gregory, and Tenzing Norgay.

The Duke of Edinburgh's International Award was founded in 1956 by HRH Prince Philip, Kurt Hahn (German educationalist) and Sir Hunt. It was not until the 18th of July, 1963 that the Governor-General, Sir Bernard Fergusson, held the inaugural meeting of the National Council of the Duke of Edinburgh's Award to curate a Constitution for the Award in New Zealand.

As his fame projected his values into the spotlight, his team that ascended Everest with him and their relations with HRH The Prince Philip, Duke of Edinburgh, formed the basis for the Duke of Edinburgh and Hillary Award. Furthermore, the gap in young boys' education between the ages of 15 and 18 when joining the National Service, after World War 2, served as further motivation to construct a programme made to further skills such as physical activity and volunteering.

Sir Edmund Hillary in his ascent to Everest identified and broadcast the significance of adventure and building skills for the future, namely within the younger generations. This ideology was incorporated specifically in the Adventurous Journey section of the Award. His development of the Himalayan Trust, construction of schools and hospitals in Kathmandu guided the incorporation of the service section in the Award. Similarly, his continued expeditions not only within the Himalayan region but to Antarctica with his team furthered the importance of and popularised explorations and expeditions in varying regions of the world. Similarly, Hillary's legacy within New Zealand as the ambassador to India, a member of the Order of New Zealand and a Knight of the Garter further promoted the importance of community service and integrity, which linked to the values seen in the Hillary Award in New Zealand.

The relationships built with Sir Edmund Hillary and his team with HRH Prince Philip also allowed for the Award to be quickly adapted into the United Kingdom and other countries (including New Zealand as the Hillary Award), now standing at over 130 countries.

== Social Impact ==
Overall, the Hillary Award benefits a wide range of young people and fosters a healthy environment where they can cultivate personal development individually and with their peers.

Various social impacts arise from the four sections of the Hillary Award offered at all three levels. For example, the Physical Recreation section caused participants to be seen creating healthier behaviours, namely a sustainable weekly regimen, concerning exercise and training. Consequently, the incorporation of physical activity into a weekly basis for the Award resulted in physiological benefits such as increased fitness and stamina levels and psychological benefits including an increase in discipline, self-determination and relationship-building.

Conversely, the Skills section allows for participants to delve deeper into developing a skill of their choice by maintaining a practice pattern (at least once a week). Furthermore, the Hillary Award incentivises the continual of said skill even after the completion of the Award which can be attributed to the 10% increase in young people that said they would continue practising their skill (from 78% practising at least once a week to 88% intending to continue once a week).

The Adventurous Journey Expedition facilitates an environment for relationships to be created between participants and their peers as well as the facilitators which increases interpersonal skills. Similarly, the Expedition also builds self-motivation and confidence within the participants and allows for personal growth within the trip. The physical activity in the trip also contributes to building participants' stamina and interest in outdoor activities. This appeal toward this type of activity seen in the Expedition (e.g. hiking, paddling, canoeing, etc.) was sustained as only 6% of participants assessed that they would not like to participate in similar activities, thus inferring that 94% of participants believed that their interest in such outdoor activities would continue after the Award. Contrastingly, the Exploration Adventurous Journey forges a learning environment where participants also develop independent learning and research skills that assist in the senior educational stages. Both forms of the Adventurous Journey caused participants to gain a greater appreciation for the environment after delving themselves in it for a certain period of time which linked to active participation in preventative climate groups.

The Voluntary Service component of the Hillary Award fosters personal development and increases the social awareness of participants as they involve themselves within their community as well as explore new social environments. The exposure the young people receive also contributes to youth development as they find their own interests in the process and construe their own beliefs whilst also maintaining an open-mind. Social awareness also aids in various career choices and allows for the participants to have a well-rounded approach to social justice issues, problems associated with their work and generally in the social climate. These unique experiences structured through volunteering also result in improvements within participants' mental wellbeing as an increase in self-worth, self-esteem and a sense of accomplishment. Similarly, leadership, communication and time-management skills are formed as their involvement in community service allows them to observe how to perform certain activities and transform them into applicable skills. The increase in these adaptive skills such as communication and volunteering experience results in an increase in employability and career opportunities for those that have completed the Award. This can then be transformed into future-proofing skills that allow for a more stable future including that surrounding leadership. The increased employer appeal and experience gained by the Award participants also links to participants being more well-informed concerning finding a stable and enjoyable career for themselves as well as being more experienced when it comes to applications.

Additionally, the general impacts on the wider community include an increase in social cohesion as the participants maintain a sustained involvement within their community through the service component. This creates a cohesive relationship between various communities and an inclusive environment where participants from minority groups also experienced personal growth, team working and social skills at the same levels as their privileged counterparts. Significant environmental benefits result from the support of many of Aotearoa New Zealand's environmental conservation groups for the Award, through providing opportunities as well as resources for the Adventurous Journey component.

Unusually, programs for young male offenders have been created, to help with rehabilitation through the development of healthy behaviours. As a result of an increase in confidence, various transferable skills and the opportunity to help their community, many young offenders have seen a positive shift in regards to their behaviour and interactions with others whilst also opening up job opportunities after they finish their prison sentence.

== Partners and sponsors ==
There is an abundance of partners and sponsors for the Hillary Award that provide funding for and support the delivery of the Award as well as how it reaches a wide variety of communities across New Zealand. The donations assist with participants' registration fee, activity expenses namely alongside the Adventurous Journey and the costs of supporting the Award Leaders.

The partners are ranked according to their donation amount and long-term support with four tiers of sponsors:

1. Platinum partner that assists the Award is the Ministry of Youth Development as administered by the Ministry of Social Development.
2. Gold partners include; the Foundation North, Friedlander Foundation, Pelorus Trust and the Tai Shan Foundation.
3. Silver partners that assist the Hillary Award include; Macpac, Google (specifically the sector for non-for-profits), Gravity Lab and New Zealand Community Trust.
4. Bronze and other partners of the Award are; Grassroots Trust, TOI Foundation, Rātā Foundation, Community Organisation Grants Scheme, Four Winds, Hugh Hunter Berg Charitable Trust.

== See also ==
- The Duke of Edinburgh's Award (DofE)
