= Joan Ford =

Canadian doctor and mountaineer (1925–2021)

Joan Ford CM
- Born: November 4, 1925; Newcastle-under-Lyme, England
- Died: October 31, 2021 (aged 95); Vancouver, British Columbia
- Occupation: Doctor

Joan Ford CM (November 4, 1925 – October 31, 2021) was a British-born Canadian doctor who was the first woman physician at the Royal Columbian Hospital in British Columbia. She spent part of her career in Nepal serving the local Sherpa population.

== Early life ==
Ford was born in Newcastle-under-Lyme in England on November 4, 1925, to Margaret Jessie (née Coghill) and Ronald Mylne Ford. Her mother was a magistrate; her father was a lawyer who served as mayor of Newcastle. She was the third among four siblings; her brother John Ford was a diplomat who served as British High Commissioner to Canada between 1978 and 1981. She graduated from medical school at Sheffield University in 1948.

== Career ==
Ford started her career in British Columbia, where she was the first woman to work as a physician at the Royal Columbian Hospital, and was the president of the Medical Women of Canada. She was also noted to have driven a campaign for equal pay for women doctors. During this time she was a locum in remote parts of British Columbia including the coastal community of Bella Coola, and she later went to Dominica in the Caribbean. She retired in Dease Lake, at the boundary between Yukon and British Columbia.

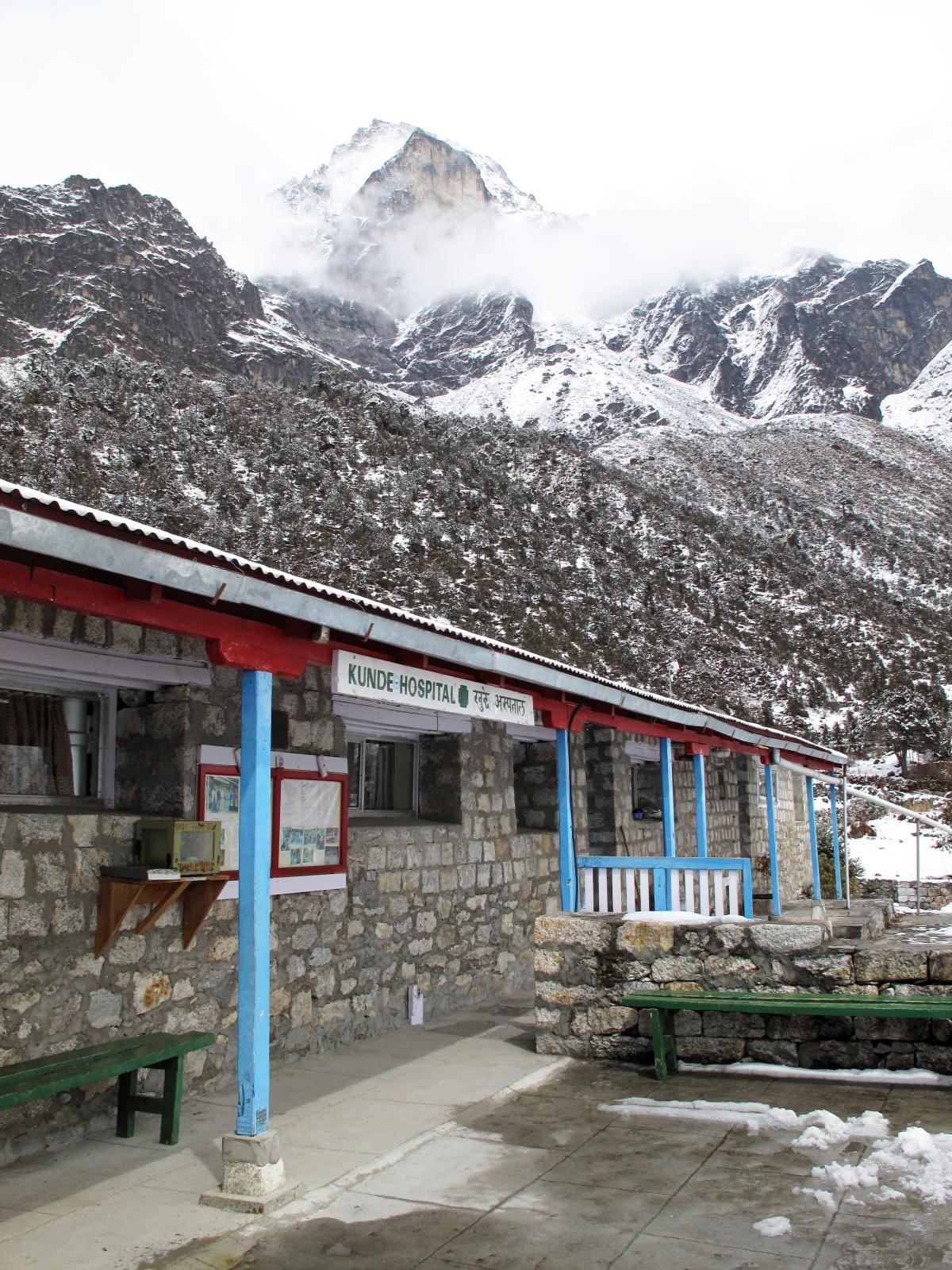
Kunde Hospital

Ford's association with the Sherpas stemmed from a 1979 conversation with the New Zealand mountaineer Edmund Hillary who was the first to ascend Mount Everest with his climbing partner Tenzing Norgay. Based on the conversation, Ford took up an offer to serve at the hospital that Hillary had set up in the Himalayas in Kunde, Nepal. The hospital is at an altitude of over 3,800 m (12,500 ft) and is amongst the highest hospitals in the world. Ford used the opportunity to take a break at age 55 from her doctoral duties in British Columbia, moving to a village in Nepal, treating Sherpas in the mountainous region. She started out serving a locum for six weeks to provide coverage for resident doctors, but returned to do more than five locums over the next ten years. When weather conditions grounded flights, she had to trek over multiple mountain passes to reach the hospital. The hospital brought birth control and immunisation to the region, and it also ended disease caused by lack of iodine which was endemic. She would recall the brief given to her by Hillary to get to the Himalayas, "He told me to take my Adidas runners, a stethoscope and an umbrella." Operating in the Himalayas, Ford respected the traditional healing methods of the Sherpas, including Buddhist practices. The Kunde hospital is now staffed by local doctors including one who was born at the hospital in 1983.

For the work she had done with the Sherpas, Ford was appointed a member of the Order of Canada in 1991. She also received the David M. Bachop Gold Medal for distinguished medical service from the BC Medical Association in 1991. Her work was made into a documentary She Makes Mountain Calls by filmmaker Beverley Reid.

== Personal life ==
Ford was a mountaineer herself, hiking along British Columbia's coastal range. She was a member of BC's Mountain Rescue Group, which later became the North Shore Rescue group looking to rescue stranded hikers in British Columbia.

Ford died on October 31, 2021, in a medically assisted death. She was aged 95.

== See also ==
- Kunde Hospital
