= Himalayan Trust =

New Zealand–based non-profit organisation

- Founded: 1960
- Founder: Sir Edmund Hillary
- Founded at: New Zealand
- Type: International organization
- Registration no.: CC39393
- Purpose: Poverty eradication, disaster relief
- Headquarters: New Zealand
- Region served: Solukhumbu district, Nepal
- Chair: Lynley Cook
- Website: www.himalayantrust.org

The Himalayan Trust is an international non-profit humanitarian organisation first established in the 1960s by Sir Edmund Hillary, who led the trust until his death in 2008. The Himalayan Trust aims to improve the health, education and general wellbeing of people living in the Solukhumbu District.

The Himalayan Trust is headquartered in New Zealand where it is a registered charity through the Charities Commission. The Trust has charitable status being a member of the Council for International Development (CID).

== Organisational structure ==
The Himalayan Trust operates from New Zealand. It maintains a small staff, preferring to work through partnerships with local NGOs in Nepal, such as The Himalayan Trust Nepal and has a focus on capacity building.

A board of directors meets regularly to approve strategic plans and budgets and determine policy. The current chairperson is Lynley Cook. The board is made up of eight members who are elected every two years. The members cover a wide range of experience and expertise across education and health, and all have a passion for Nepal.

A large proportion of the funding comes from donations from the New Zealand public, as well ongoing support from New Zealand's Ministry of Foreign Affairs and Trade Aid Programme.

== History ==
Key dates of the Himalayan Trust
- 1960: Sir Edmund Hillary establishes the Himalayan Trust
- 1961: Khumjung school is built
- 1963: Pangboche and Thami school built.
- 1964: First landing at Lukla airstrip after built by the Trust
- 1966: Khunde hospital opens
- 1973: Salleri High school built.
- 1976: Phaplu hospital opens
- 1986: Kharikhola Middle school built
- 2002: Local Sherpa, Kami Temba takes charge at Khunde hospital
- 2007: Himalayan Trust Nepal registered as a local NGO to works in Nepal for Himalayan Trust New Zealand.
- 2014: Lukla water project completed.
- 2014: Everest Avalanche Appeal launched..
- 2015: Nepal Earthquake Appeal launched and rebuild work begins.

In 1960, Sir Edmund Hillary was in the Everest region leading the 1960-61 Silver Hut expedition, an expedition studying high altitude physiology and looking for the Yeti. At a high camp one night he asked Sirdar Urkien what, above all, would he like for his children and the Sherpa people. Urkien asked for a school in his village of Khumjung. When the village elders gave permission for the supposed 200-year-old Yeti scalp in the Khumjung Monastery to be taken for examination by scientists in Paris, London or Chicago, one of the conditions was that a school be built in Khumjung (the experts said the relic had been fabricated from the skin of a serow or goat-antelope).

The first school was built in the Khumbu region of Nepal. Built by Wally Romanes in a week from prefabricated aluminium sections flown into Mingbo and carried down to Khumjung, it opened in mid-June 1961, the first major project of the Himalayan Trust.

Khumjung School in 1961

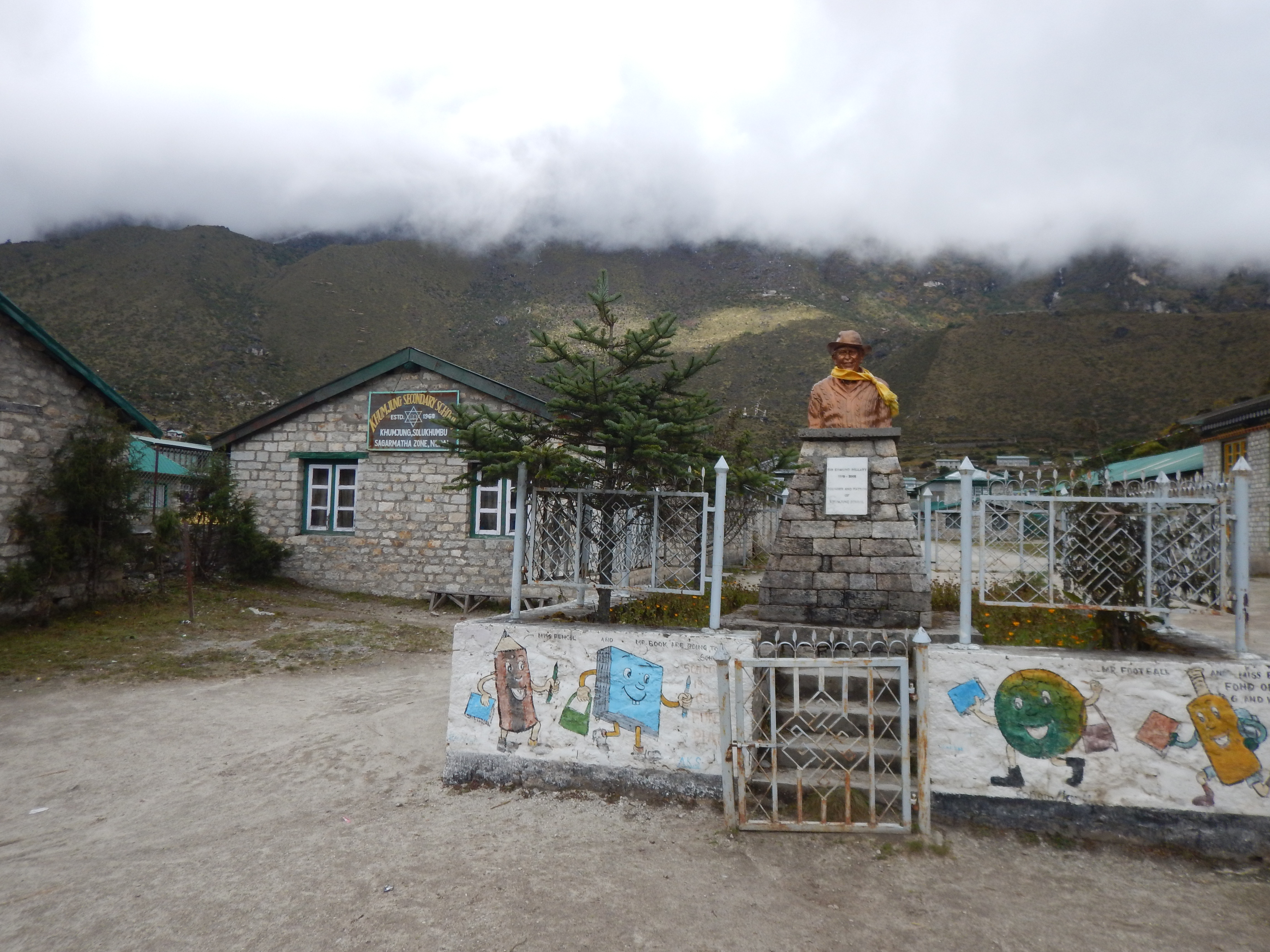
Khumjung School in 2017

Hillary wrote:

The opening ceremony was a remarkable occasion. Surrounded by clouds and fog with frequent showers of rain, the villagers celebrated the important occasion with great enthusiasm.

The following year Hillary received requests for two more schools, one from Thame and one from Pangboche. The letter from Thame read:

27 October 1962

Sir

Respected Bara Sahib Sir Edmund Hillary

We the local people, the Sherpas of Thame, Khumbu, came to know that your honour, helping us in all respects, is going to open some more schools in Khumbu. So we Thame people are requesting your honour to open a school at Thame just like Khumjung. Though our children have eyes but still they are blind! So all we Sherpas of Thame are praying your honour to make our children just like those of Khumjung. We hope your honour may consider our prayer.

Yours,

Chewang Rimpi Sherpa

Thak Noori Sherpa

Kinken Kang Sherpa

Khunjo Chumbi Sherpa

Both schools were completed in 1963 along with other Himalayan Trust projects. These included building a pipeline to bring Khumjung's water from its source in Khumbila to a reservoir in the village as well as running a smallpox immunization programme. The programme resulted in more than 3,000 people being vaccinated, with the result that the outbreak was limited to a few dozen people and about twenty deaths.

The Trust ended up building 26 schools in total over a period of 30 years. These schools were initially staffed and funded through the Trust until 1972 when the government took over the administration of all schools and education in the area. The Trust has a formal agreement with the Nepalese Government to continue to provide teaching resources and support to schools within the Solukhumbu Region.

By 1964, it was clear to Edmund Hillary that the transport of building materials needed to be easier, so the Himalayan Trust built an airstrip. The site chosen was beside the tiny village of Lukla, now the second busiest airstrip in Nepal. That year, aid projects also included a school in Namche and a bridge over the rough waters of the Dudh Kosi.

In 1966 the Himalayan Trust built the Kunde Hospital. The hospital was staffed by John R McKinnon from 1966 until 1968. During this time Diane Margaret McKinnon (née Diane Margaret Jack) taught at the Khumbu primary school. Their term in the Solu Khumbu ended when their son, Aaron Dorje McKinnon, was born. During this time the airstrip at Lukla (initially built with assistance from the Himalayan Trust) was extended to allow for the arrival of larger aircraft.

The building of Phaplu Hospital followed in 1975. Both hospitals were staffed by volunteer doctors from New Zealand and Canada working for periods of two years. Eventually both hospitals were handed over to local doctors – Phaplu to Dr Mingmar Gyelzen in 1982, and Khunde to Dr Kami Temba in 2001.

== Recent activities ==
A devastating 7.8 magnitude earthquake struck Nepal on 25 April 2015, followed just 18 days later by a second earthquake measuring 7.3 in magnitude. This was one of the worst natural disasters in Nepal's history and it left 2.8 million people across the country in urgent need of humanitarian assistance.

In the immediate aftermath of the earthquake, The Himalayan Trust provided emergency shelter, bedding and other essential items for affected communities in the Solukhumbu region.

Of the more than 60 schools supported by the Himalayan Trust, 10 were completely destroyed and all sustained some damage. Temporary classrooms were provided in 30 schools – either by donating tents, retrofitting damaged buildings or constructing temporary shelters. All teachers in Solukhumbu have received training to support traumatized children.

Until 2020, work will continue to rebuild and carry out seismic strengthening on classrooms, teachers' quarters, student hostels and toilet blocks in up to 30 schools across the Solukhumbu district.

In 2013, a water and sanitation project was launched in Lukla to enable all residents of the village to have access to fresh, running water and to establish a fire-fighting system. This was established by Lukla residents and the Himalayan Trust provided 50 percent of the funding. In 2015, the project was successfully completed.

In April 2014, an avalanche on Mount Everest killed 16 Nepalese guides. The Trust immediately set up a fund to support the families of those killed in the disaster. The fund includes a scholarship programme for the children of the victims, ensuring they receive a full education and helping them explore alternative employment opportunities.

The Himalayan Trust continues to support schools in the Solukhumbu region, providing educational resources and specialist high school curriculum training for teachers. They also provide training in English medium teaching and support an academic scholarships programme that is open to all students in the region.

== Notable affiliated persons ==
- Sir Edmund Hillary
- Peter Hillary
