= William Paterson Paterson =

Scottish minister

William Paterson Paterson F.R.S.E. D.D. LL.D.
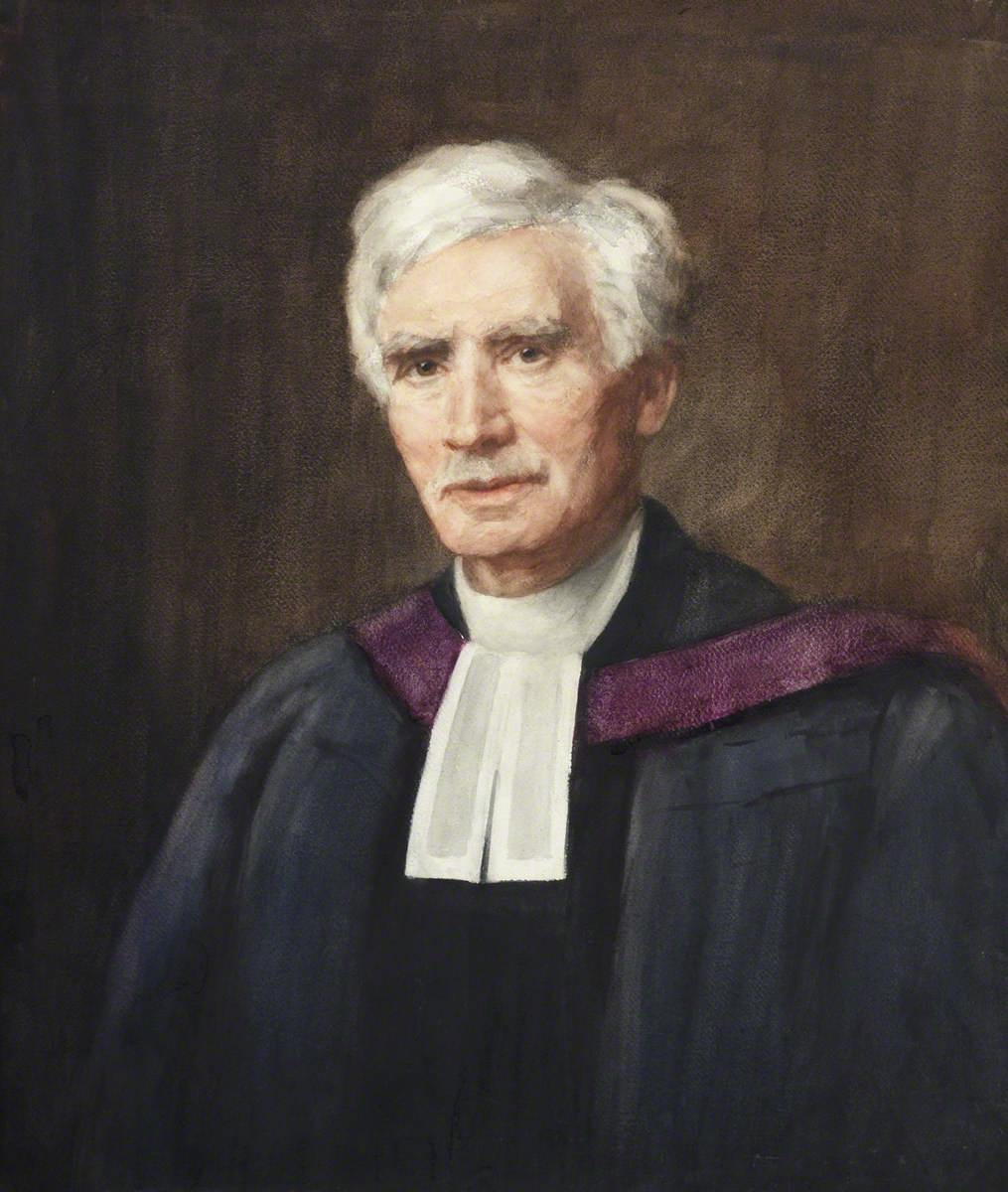
- Portrait of William Paterson Paterson from 1903
- Born: 1860
- Died: 1939 (aged 78–79)
- Occupation: minister
- Title: The Reverend

William Paterson Paterson FRSE DD LLD (1860–1939) was a Scottish minister of the Church of Scotland. He was professor of divinity at the University of Edinburgh from 1904 to 1934. He served as Moderator of the General Assembly of the Church of Scotland in 1919. He was central to the reunification of the United Free Church of Scotland with the Church of Scotland in 1929.

== Life ==
He was born on 25 October 1860 at Skirling Mains in Peeblesshire, the eldest son of Mary Waugh and her husband John Paterson, a farmer. He was educated at Skirling and the Royal High School of Edinburgh then studied first Classics (graduating MA in 1880) then Divinity at the University of Edinburgh (graduating BD in 1883). He did further postgraduate study in various German universities at Leipzig, Erlangen and Berlin, returning to Scotland in 1885.

Paterson was licensed to preach by the Church of Scotland in June 1885 and his first role was as an assistant minister in Galashiels then he moved to St Columba's Church in London. He was ordained as minister of St Michaels in Crieff in September 1887 and stayed there until 1894. In 1894 he was created Professor of Systematic Theology at the University of Aberdeen. In 1904 he moved to the University of Edinburgh as professor of divinity, succeeding Prof Robert Flint. He was dean of the Faculty of Divinity 1912 to 1928. In 1916 he became Chaplain in Ordinary to King George V in Scotland in 1916.

In 1918 Paterson was elected a fellow of the Royal Society of Edinburgh. His proposers were Cargill Gilston Knott, James MacKinnon, James Alfred Ewing and Sir Edmund Taylor Whittaker. In 1919 he succeeded James Nicoll Ogilvie as Moderator of the General Assembly. His year in office did much to bring about reunification with the United Free Church of Scotland.

Paterson retired in 1934. The University of Edinburgh granted him a second honorary doctorate (LLD) in 1937 (having granted him a DD in 1897). He also received honorary doctorates from Pennsylvania (1905), Dublin (1920), Glasgow (1926) and St Andrews (1937). He died at home, 3 Royal Terrace in Edinburgh (previously Robert Flint's house) on 10 January 1939. He is buried close to his family in Skirling.

== Artistic recognition ==
Paterson was portrayed by Fiddes Watt.

== Family ==
In 1888 he married Jane Sanderson (died 1928) daughter of Robert Sanderson of Galashiels.

They had three daughters and four sons. Two sons were killed in the First World War. There is much family information in the following publication, coordinated by his granddaughter Mrs. Anne Gray: "The Diaries of William Paterson Paterson", edited by Clive L. Rawlins, Faith and Life Books, Edinburgh, 1987.

== Publications ==
- The Apostles Teaching (1903)
- The Rule of Faith (1912)
- In the Day of the Muster (1914)
- In the Day of the Ordeal (1917)
- The Nature of Religion (1925)
- Conversion (1939)
