= Pheriche =

Pheriche फेरिचे
- Village
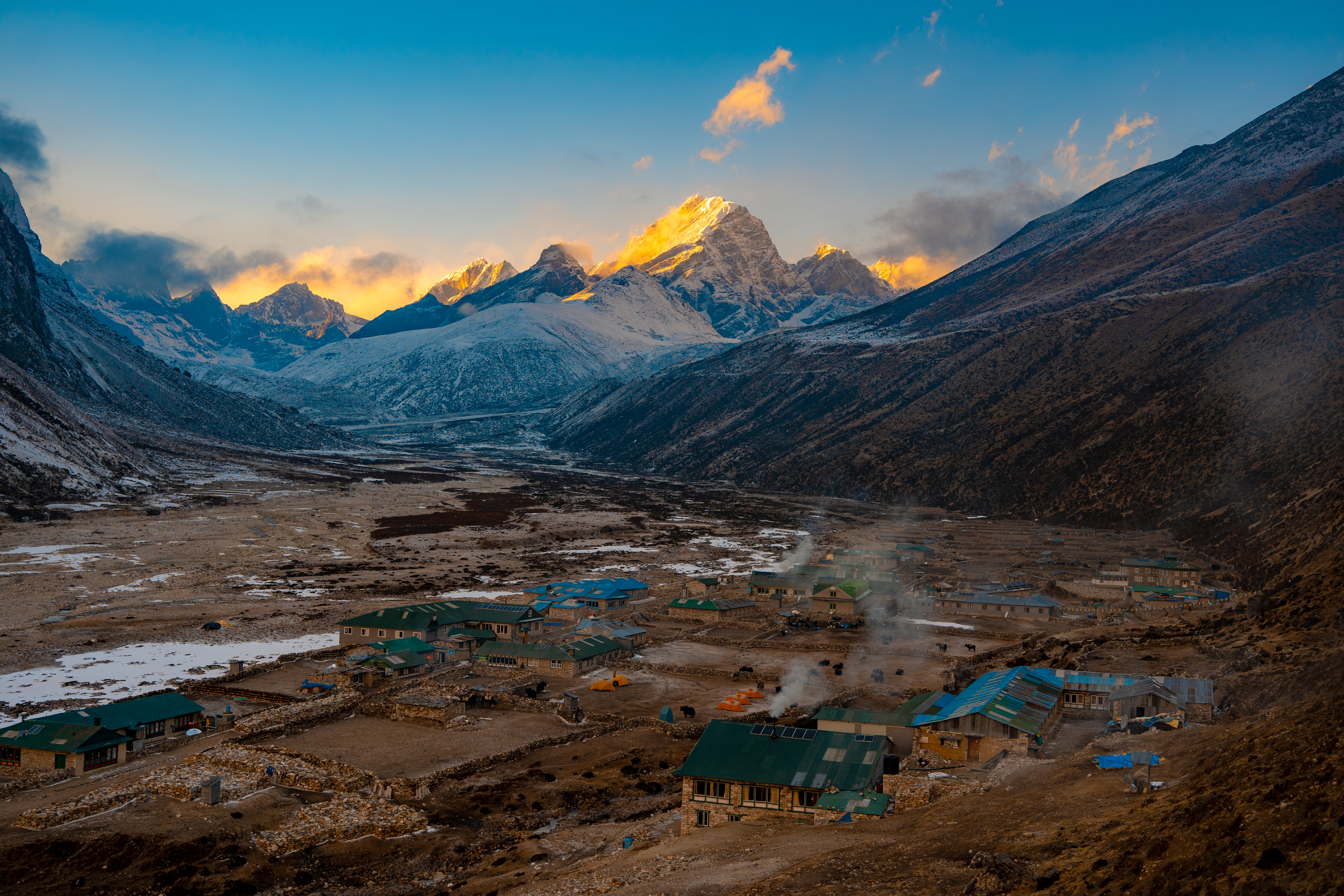
- Pheriche with mountains in the background.

- Location in Province No. 1 Pheriche (Nepal)
- Coordinates: 27°53′36.82″N 86°49′11.56″E
- Country: Nepal
- Province: Province No. 1
- District: Solukhumbu District
- Elevation: 4,371 m (14,341 ft)
- Time zone: UTC+5:45 (NST)

Pheriche (Nepali: फेरिचे) is a village in the Khumbu region of eastern Nepal. Situated at an altitude of about 4,371 m (14,340 ft), above the Tsola River, Pheriche is a popular stop for trekkers and climbers. There is a rudimentary hospital in Pheriche managed by the Himalayan Rescue Association. The Pheriche hospital is open only during the two trekking/climbing seasons (March–May and October–December). Although the hospital was built with Japanese support in 1975, it is staffed by Nepalis and volunteer physicians who are mostly from the US, Europe, Canada and Australia.

Pheriche was primarily a farming village raising potatoes and buckwheat, and keeping yaks. However, now in the summer, many of its men are employed by trekkers as guides and porters. There are also many lodges where trekkers and climbers on their way to the Mt. Everest Base Camp can stay. It is an important acclimatization stopover. There are over 25 local guest houses, that are called tea houses in America. The population of local Sherpas is 150 as per the latest Census of Nepal and all of them are followers of Tibetan Buddhism.

It was heavily damaged in the devastating April 2015 Nepal earthquake, but only one local dweller was wounded, partly due to people being outside their dwellings during the day. The area is a relief and treatment center and an evacuation point.

== Gallery ==
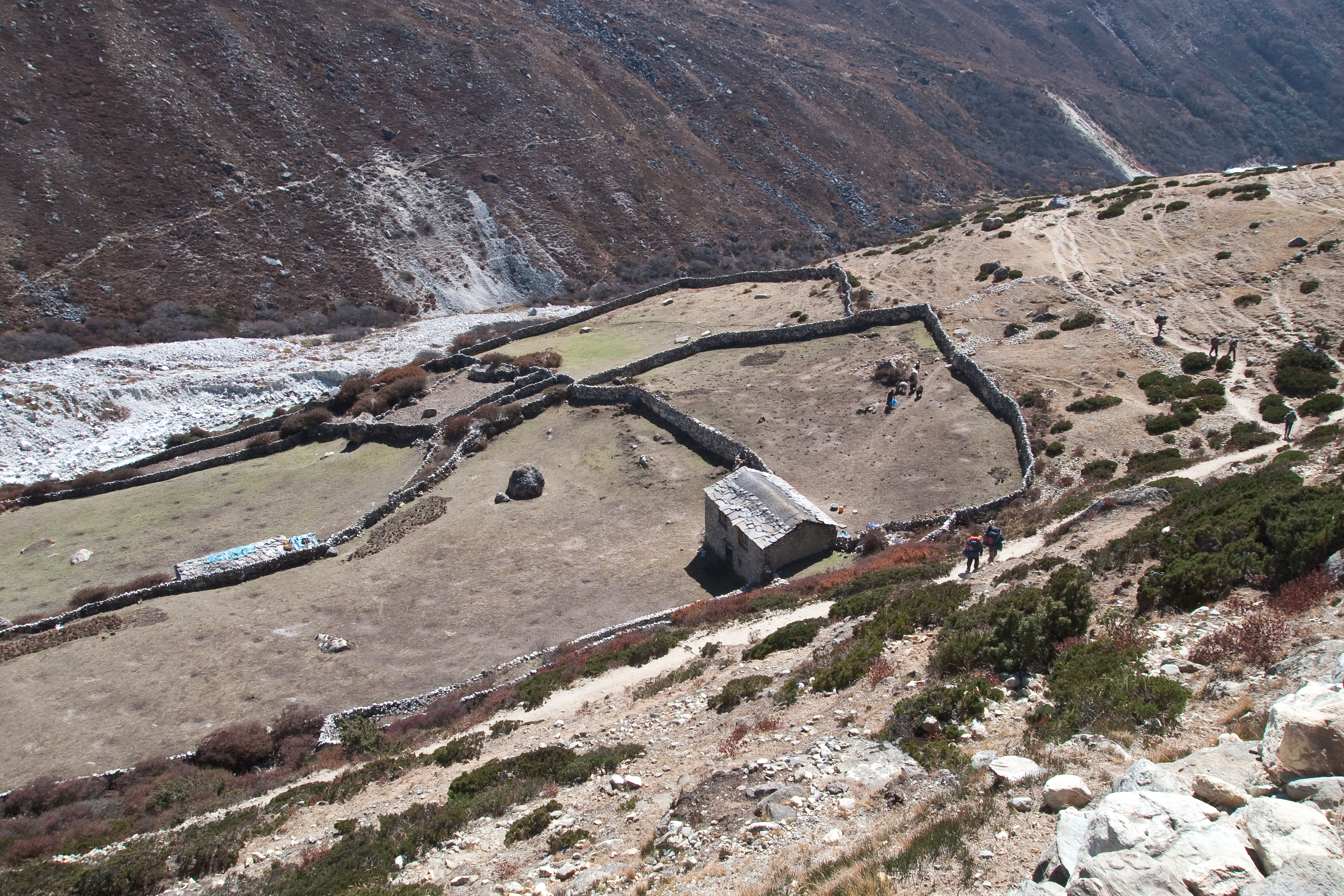
Terraces

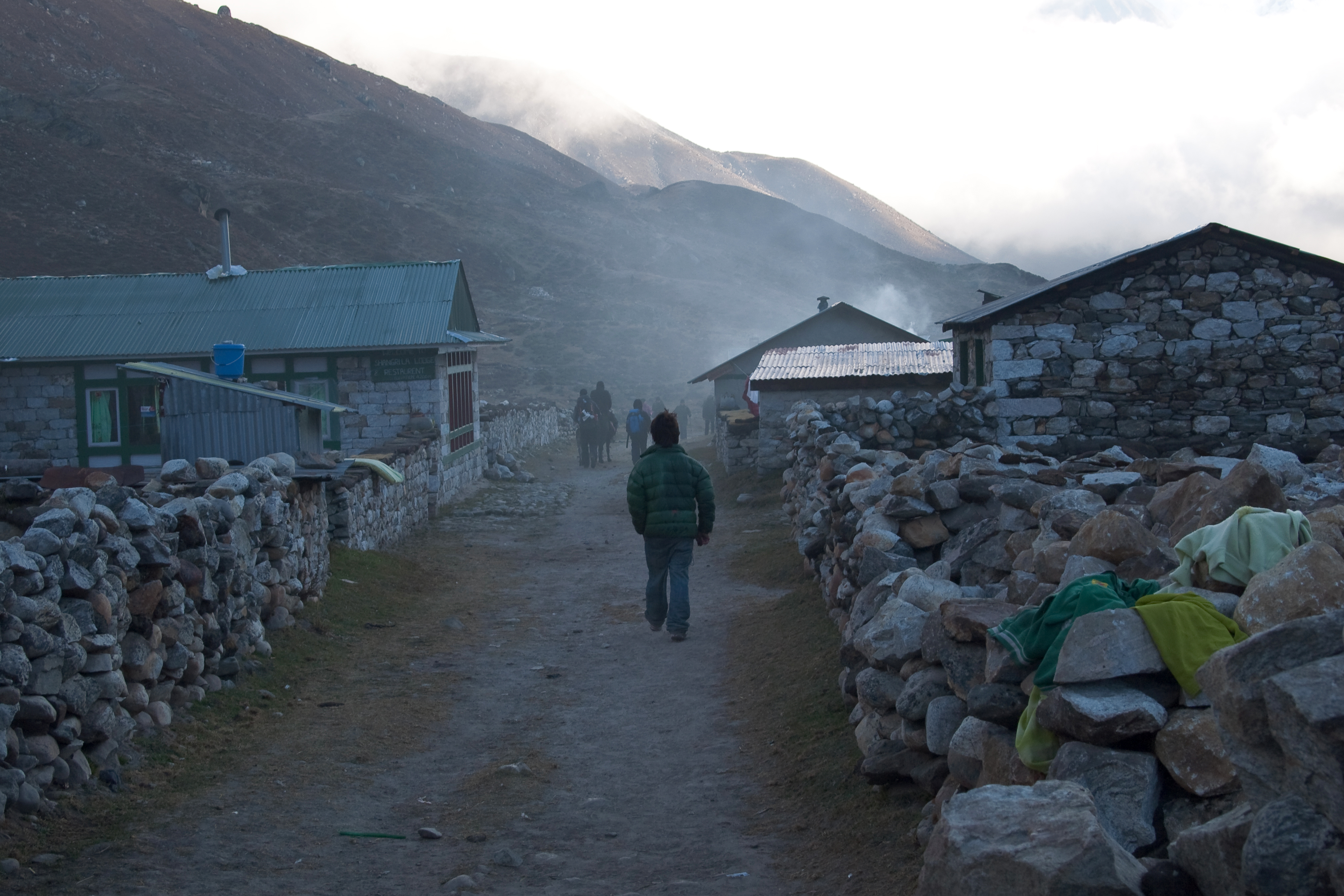
Pheriche

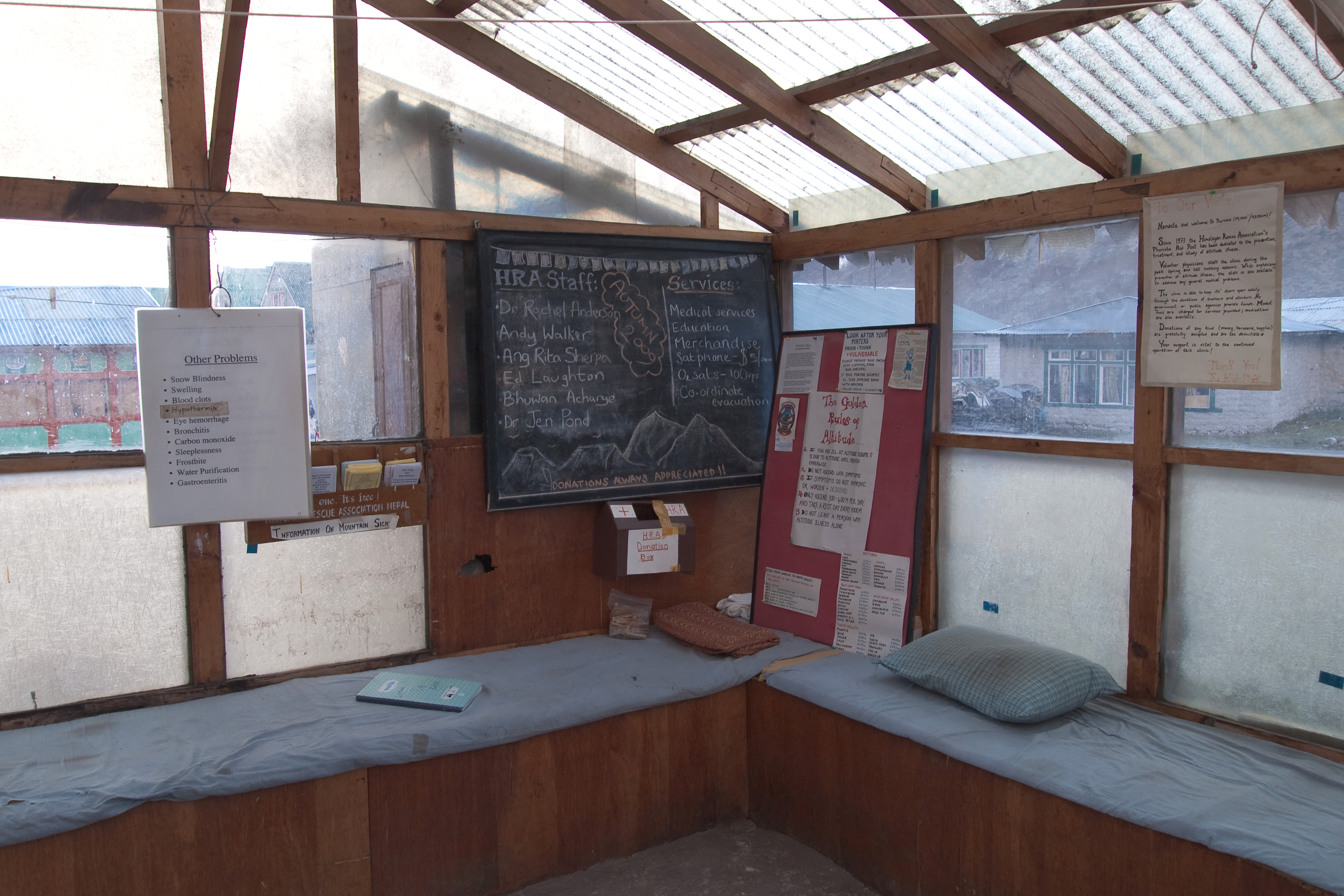
Himalayan Rescue Post

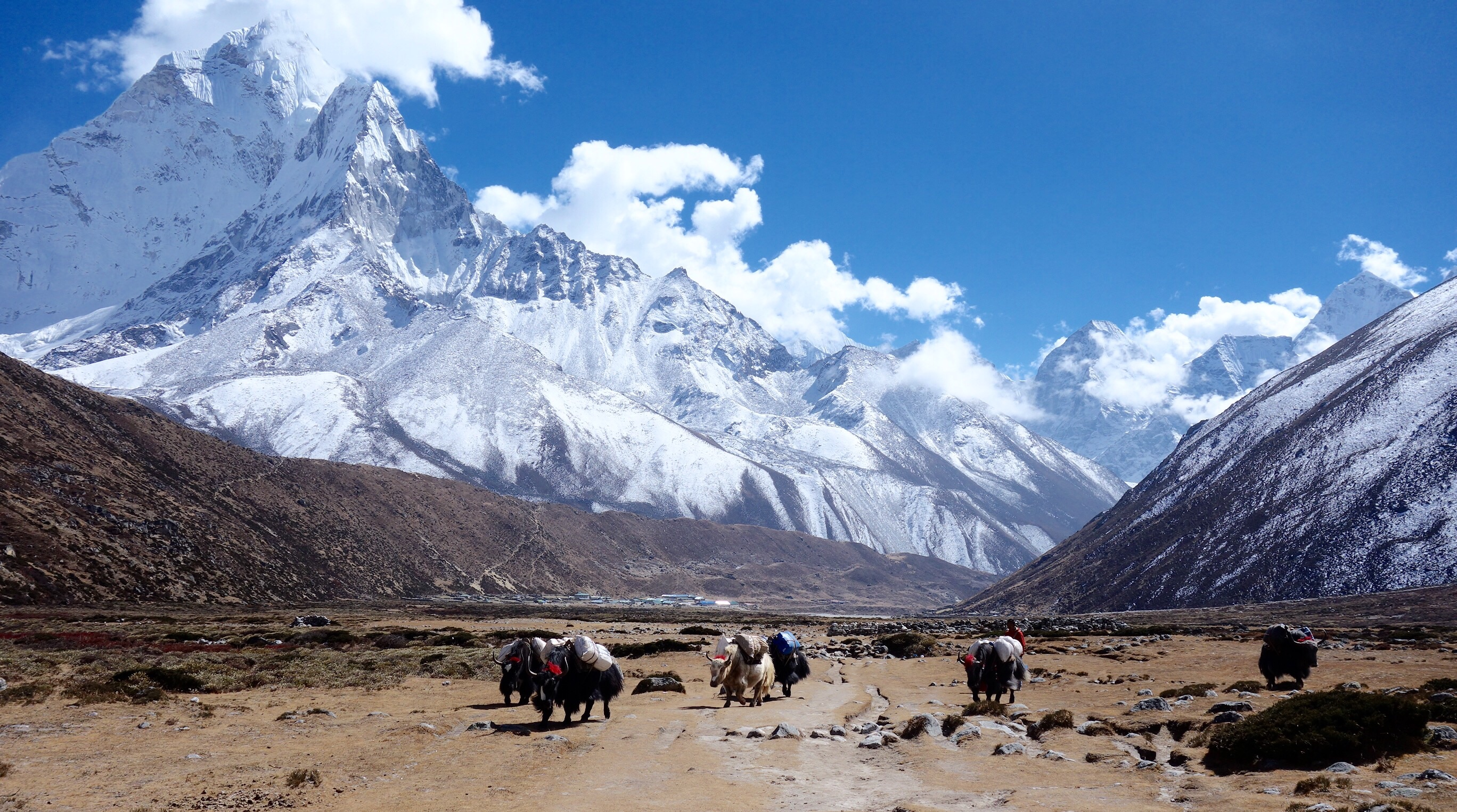
Yaks passing by Pheriche
