= Donald MacKinnon =

Donald MacKinnon may refer to:

- Donald MacKinnon (Celtic scholar) (1839–1914), Scottish Celtic scholar
- Donald Alexander MacKinnon (1863–1928), Canadian politician and author
- Donald M. MacKinnon (1913–1994), Scottish philosopher and theologian
- Donald MacKinnon (Scottish politician)
- Donald Mackinnon (1859–1932), Australian politician
- Donald James Mackinnon (1928–2017), his grandson, Australian politician
- Donald W. MacKinnon (1903–1987), American psychologist
- Donald MacKinnon (cricketer) (1842–1931), Scottish cricketer
- Donald Mackinnon (diplomat) (1892–1965), Australian public servant and diplomat

== See also ==
- Don McKinnon (disambiguation)
