= Phortse =

Village in Solukhumbu District, Nepal

Phortse is a village located at 3840m in Khumbu, Nepal.

It is off the main trekking circuit and therefore more resembles an authentic Sherpa village. There is a high trail connection to Pangpoche offering splendid views across the valley, which can be used instead of the standard Tengboche route.

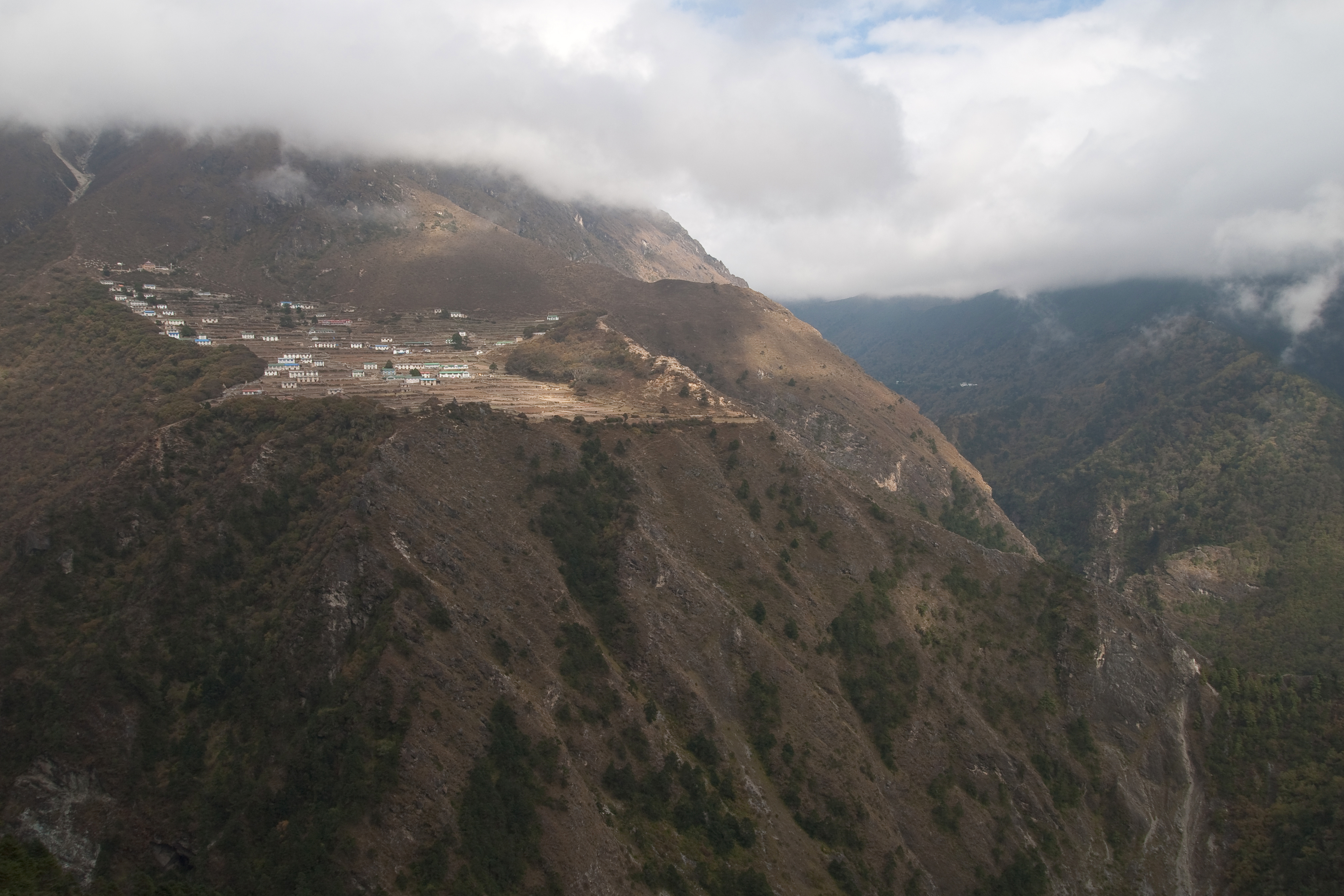
Phortse at the confluence of two valleys in Khumbu region.

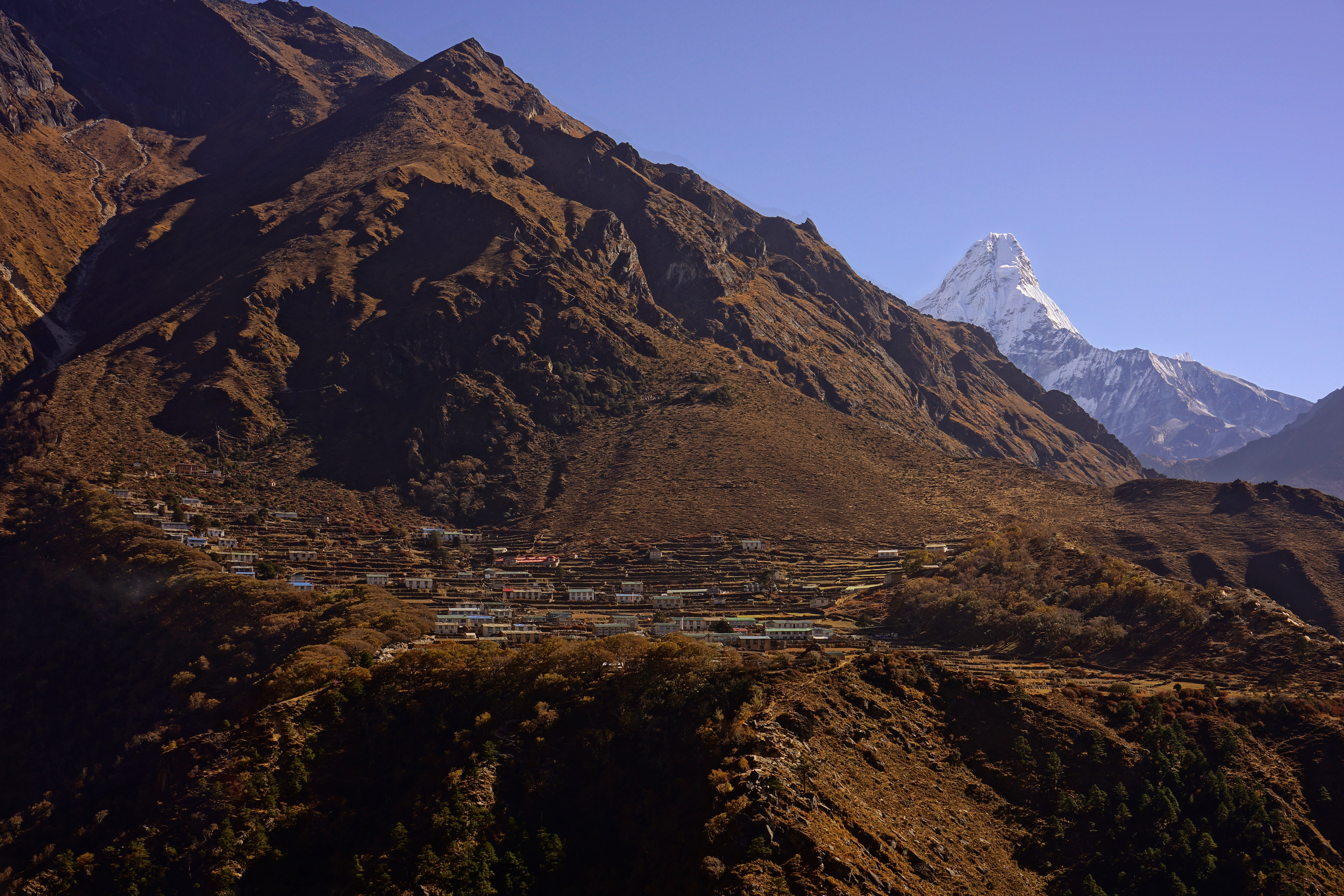
Phortse village

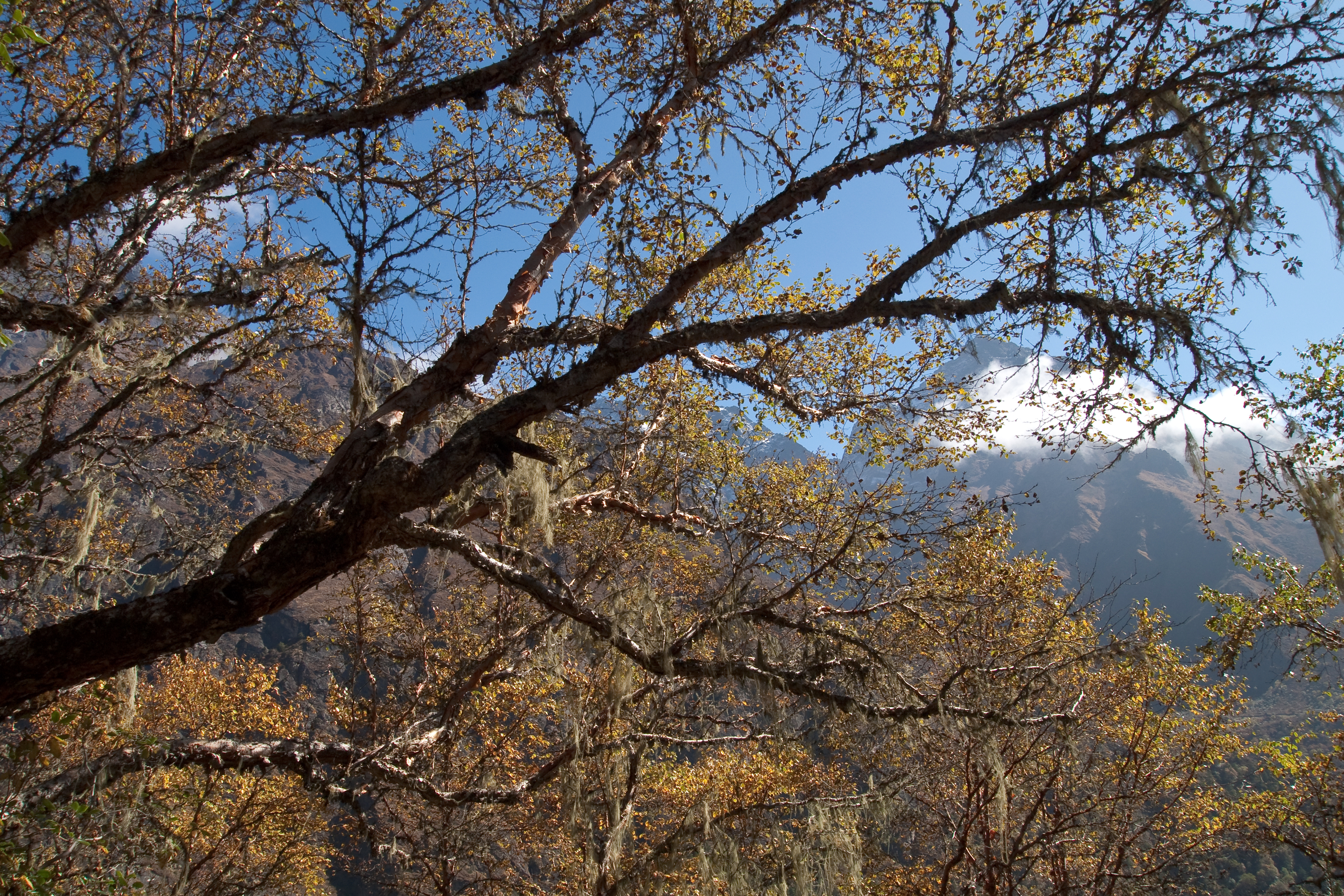
Trees
