= McKinnon (disambiguation) =

McKinnon (MacKinnon, Mackinnon) is a surname.

McKinnon may also refer to:

== Places ==
=== Australia ===
- McKinnon, Victoria in Australia, suburb of Melbourne
  - McKinnon Secondary College, a State Secondary College
  - McKinnon railway station, on the Frankston railway line

=== United States ===
- McKinnon, Georgia in Wayne County, Georgia
- McKinnon Township, listed in List of townships in North Dakota by county
- McKinnon, Tennessee in Houston County
- McKinnon, Wyoming in Sweetwater County

=== Other countries ===
- McKinnon Park Secondary School, high school in Caledonia, Ontario
- Mackinnon Road, Kenyan town
- McKinnon's, a settlement in the Major Division of North Coast, Saint John Parish, Antigua and Barbuda

== Other uses ==
- Clan Mackinnon, a Highland Scottish clan associated with the islands of Mull and Skye
- McKinnon Broadcasting, privately owned broadcasting company based in San Diego, California
- McKinnon Prize, an Australian award for outstanding political leadership, awarded to Helen Haines, among others
