= Mount Khumbila =

Mountain in Nepal

Khumbila
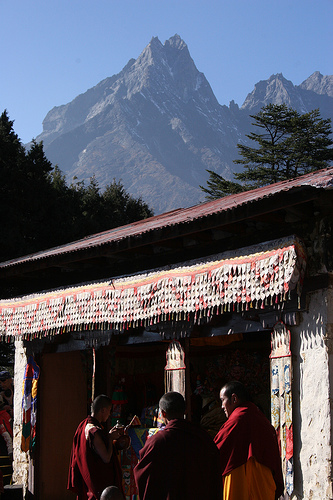
- Monks of Tengboche Monastery drinking tea during the Mani Rimdu Festival, with Mount Khumbila in the background

Highest point
- Elevation: 5,761 m (18,901 ft)
- Listing: Mountains of Nepal
- Coordinates: 27°51′01.90″N 86°41′59.85″E

Geography
- Location within Nepal
- Country: Nepal
- Region: Khumbu
- Parent range: Khumbu Himal

Climbing
- First ascent: Never climbed
- Easiest route: Unknown

Khumbila or Khumbu Yül-Lha, roughly translated as "God of Khumbu village" is one of the high Himalayan peaks in the Khumbu region of eastern Nepal within the Sagarmatha National Park. Considered too sacred to be climbed by most local Sherpa people, the mountain is considered home to the patron God of the local area. Rising 5,761m above sea level, the mountain overlooks the famous southern approaches to its larger neighbours including Ama Dablam and Mount Everest.

Khumbila has never been climbed; one attempt prior to the 1980s ended when climbers were killed in an avalanche, and there have been no subsequent attempts.

== Religious importance ==
Khumbila is said to be a god, and an old one. The prayers for Khumbila are believed to date back to the time when the ancestors of the Sherpas were still in Tibet (more than 500 years ago). Khumbila is said to have been subdued and converted to Buddhism by Guru Rimpoche, the 8th-century saint who spread Buddhism throughout the Himalaya. In fact, Guru Rimpoche is said to have spent some time meditating in a cave above Khunde, perhaps on the mountain Khumbila itself.

Local buildings often have prayer flags on bamboo wands to honour Khumbila.

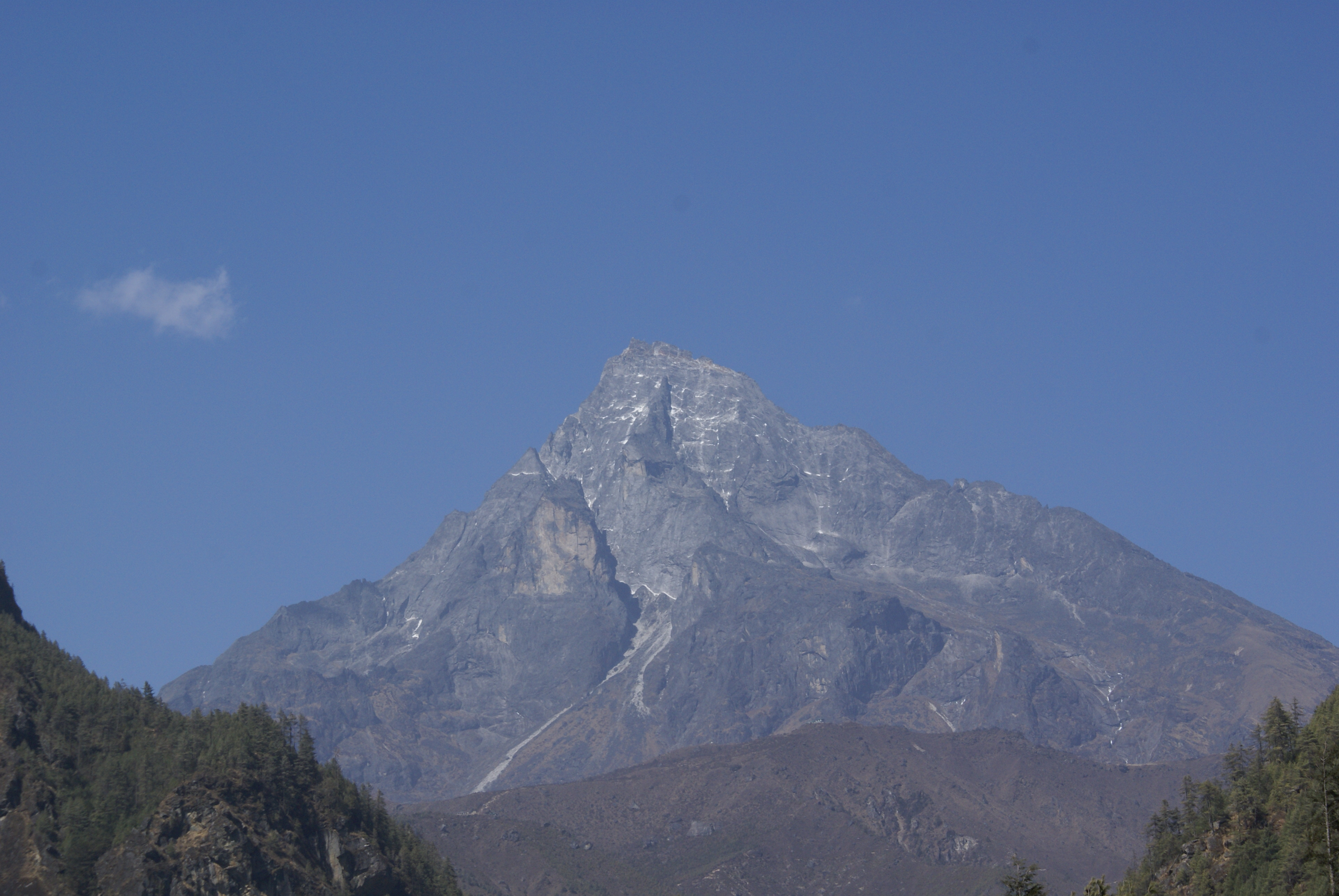
Khumbila from south

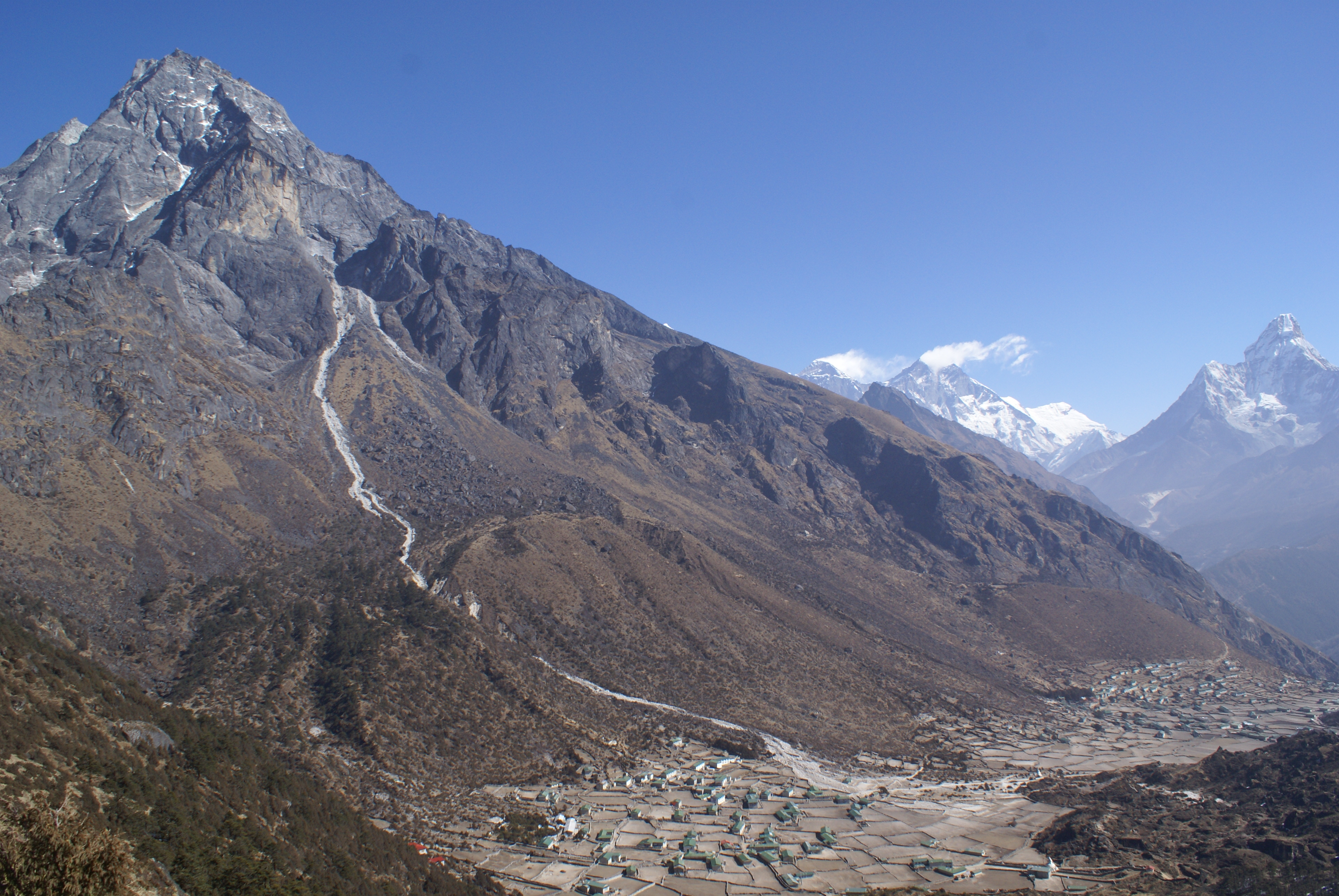
Khumbila above the Khumjung and Kunde villages

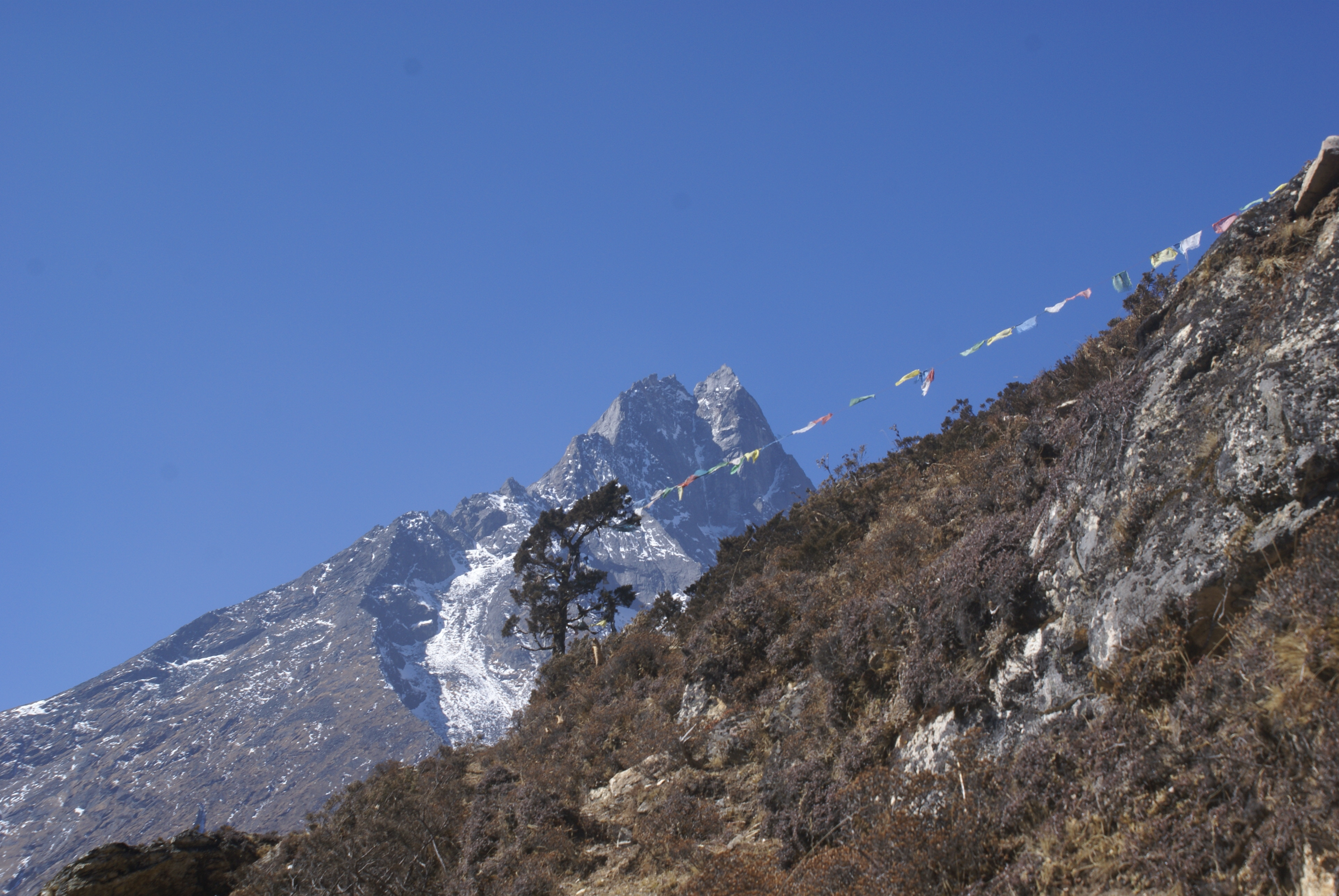
Khumbila from the east
