= Don McKinnon (disambiguation) =

Don McKinnon is the New Zealand former Deputy Prime Minister and former Secretary-General of the Commonwealth of Nations.

Don McKinnon may also refer to:

- Don McKinnon (rugby league) (born 1955), Australian rugby league footballer
- Donald McKinnon (Canadian politician) (1901–1976), Alberta MLA from 1940 to 1944
- Donnie McKinnon (born 1940), Scottish footballer

== See also ==
- Donald MacKinnon (disambiguation)
