= Kunde Hospital =

Hospital in Kunde, Khumbu, Nepal

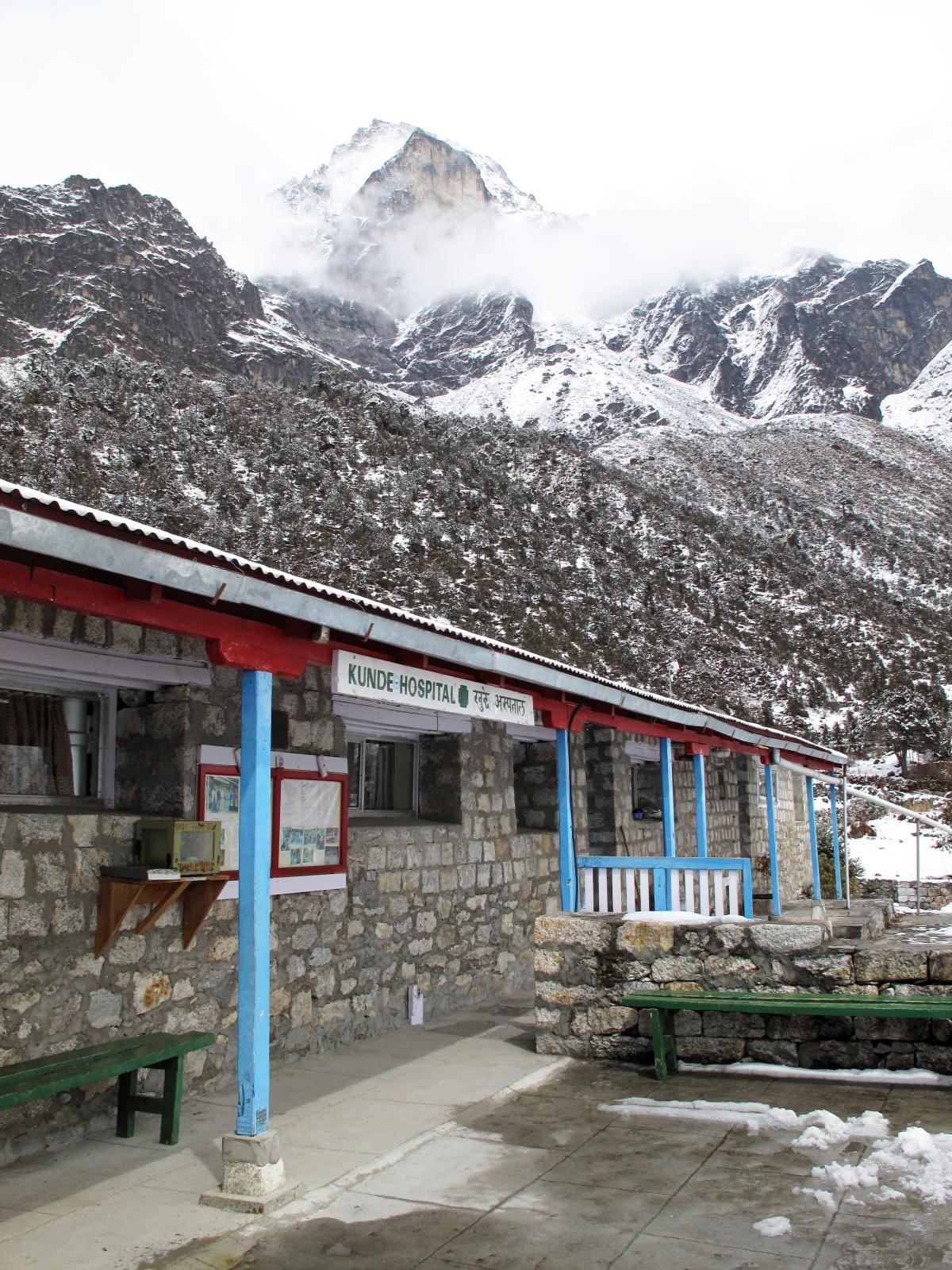

Geography
- Location: Kunde, Khumbu District, Nepal
- Coordinates: 27.823764°N 86.704767°E

Organisation
- Type: Community
- Patron: Sir Edmund Hillary

Services
- Emergency department: Yes
- Beds: 12

Helipads
- Helipad: No

History
- Opened: December 18, 1966

Links
- Lists: Hospitals in Nepal

Kunde Hospital (sometimes Khunde Hospital, Nepali: कुन्दे अस्पताल) is a community hospital in the town of Kunde, Nepal, that serves 8,000 people from Khumbu district. It is situated 3,840 metres (12,600 ft) above sea level and was founded by Sir Edmund Hillary in 1966. The hospital was funded and operated by The Himalayan Trust until 1976 and is now supported by the Sir Edmund Hillary Foundation.

== History ==
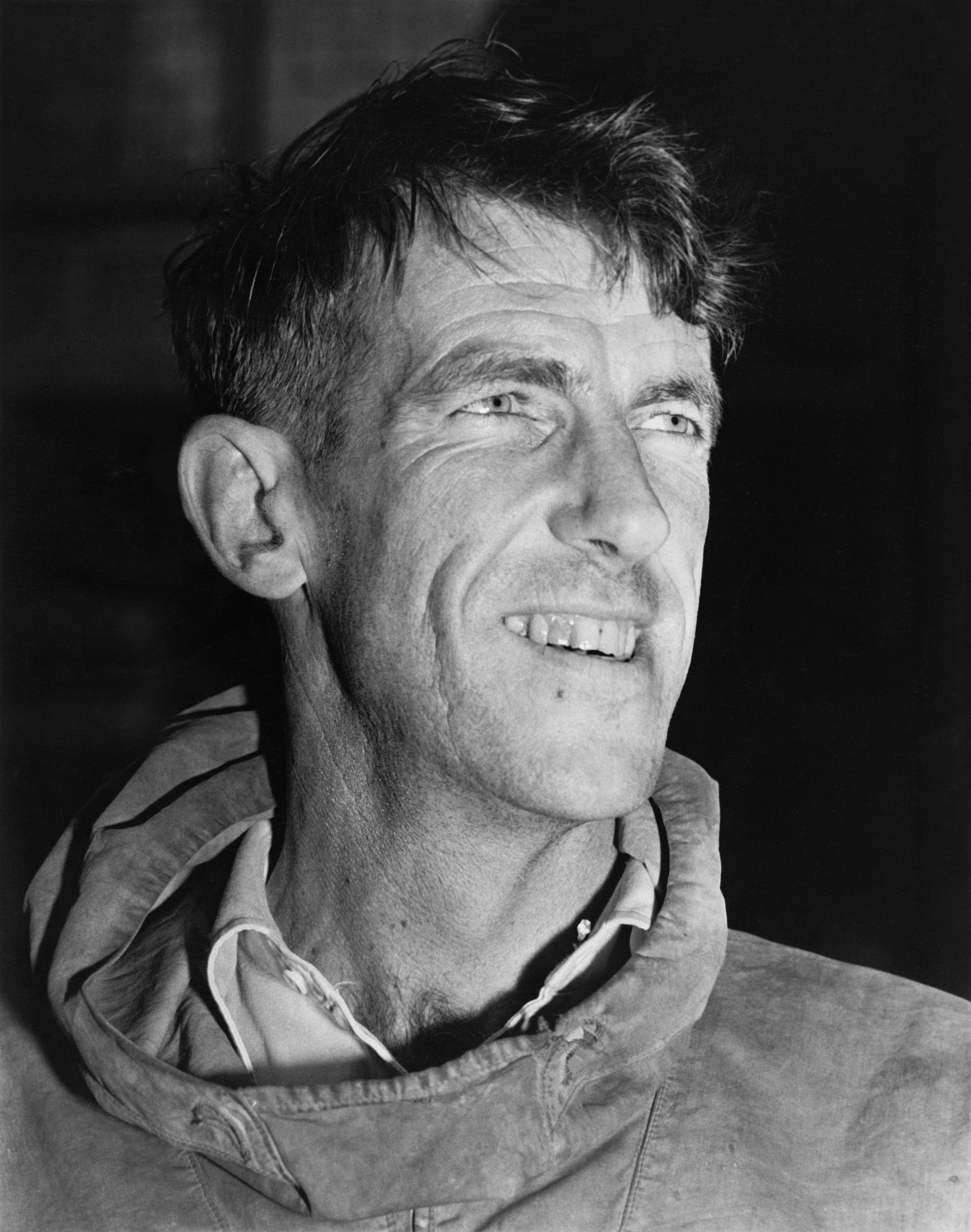
Sir Edmund Hillary

After Hillary climbed Everest in 1953, he led many further expeditions to Nepal. From the early 1960s, these expeditions had a focus on improving the health and social welfare of the people of Nepal, including the improvement of water supplies, the building of schools, bridges and an airstrip at Lukla, and the provision of medical care and a programme of vaccination against smallpox.

In 1966, Hillary, with overseas volunteers and local people, built the hospital at Kunde. The hospital opened on December 18, 1966, when Dr John McKinnon and Diane McKinnon, of New Zealand, became the first volunteer couple to staff the hospital. The hospital was initially staffed by overseas volunteers from New Zealand and Canada, provided through the Volunteer Service Abroad organisation and later by The Himalayan Trust and the Sir Edmund Hillary Foundation Canada. Canadian doctor Joan Ford was one such overseas doctor who provided services at the hospital.

Since 2002, it has been wholly staffed and run by local people. The hospital has 12 beds.
