= James MacKinnon =

James MacKinnon may refer to:

- J. B. MacKinnon (James Bernard MacKinnon, born 1970), Canadian journalist and author
- James G. MacKinnon (born 1951), Canadian economics professor
- James Angus MacKinnon (1881–1958), Canadian politician
- James Mackinnon (politician) (1841–1910), Australian politician
- James MacKinnon (cricketer) (1865–1957), Australian cricketer

== See also ==
- James McKinnon (1932–1999), American musicologist
- James McKinnon (historian) (1860-1945), Scottish historian
