= William Mackinnon =

William, Bill, Billy, Willie or Will Mackinnon, MacKinnon or McKinnon may refer to:

== Politicians ==
- William Alexander Mackinnon (Dunwich MP) (1789–1870), British politician and South Australia colonisation commissioner
- William Alexander Mackinnon (Lymington MP) (1813–1903), British politician
- William S. McKinnon (1852–1908), American politician in Ohio
- William F. MacKinnon (1919–1990), Canadian politician
- Bill McKinnon (politician) (born 1933), Scottish-born Australian member of the Tasmanian House of Assembly

== Military ==
- Sir William Alexander Mackinnon (British Army officer) (1830–1897), Director-General of British Army Medical Services
- Sir William Henry Mackinnon (1852–1929), British Army general

== Sportsmen ==
- Billy MacKinnon (1852–1942), Scottish footballer for Queen's Park and Scotland national team in 1870s
- William McKinnon (footballer, born 1859) (1859–1899), Scottish footballer for Dumbarton and Scotland national team in 1880s
- Willie MacKinnon, American player in 1974 College Division East for Vermont Catamounts men's ice hockey#All-Americans
- Will MacKinnon, American gold medalist in Ice hockey at the 2016 Winter Youth Olympics#Events

== Others ==
- Sir William Mackinnon, 1st Baronet (1823–1893), Scottish ship-owner and businessman
  - SS William Mackinnon, Uganda Railway Lake Victoria ferry named after him
- William MacKinnon (minister) (1843–1925), minister and moderator of the Free Church of Scotland
- William McKinnon (police officer) (1902–1997), Australian police officer primarily within the Northern Territory
- Bill McKinnon (public servant) (1931–1988), Australian Secretary of Department of Immigration and Ethnic Affairs
- William B. McKinnon (born 1954), American planetary scientist
- William P. MacKinnon (born 1939), American historian of Mormons and Utah
