= Donald MacKinnon (cricketer) =

Scottish cricketer

Donald William MacKinnon (3 March 1842 – 19 November 1931) was a Scottish cricketer active from 1870 to 1871 who played for Lancashire. He was born in Bangalore and died in Waterlooville. He appeared in four first-class matches. Details of his batting and bowling hands and styles are unrecorded. He scored 112 runs with a highest score of 42 and held four catches. He took seven wickets with a best analysis of three for 13.
