= John McKinnon (ophthalmologist) =

New Zealand mountaineer and hospital volunteer

John R. McKinnon (born 1938) is a New Zealand mountaineer and the first volunteer doctor at Kunde Hospital.

John McKinnon was educated at St Kevin's College, Oamaru and the University of Otago.

In 1962 he completed the first ascent of Mount Cook's south face with James Milne, Richard Stewart, & Peter Strang. This brought him to the attention of Edmund Hillary who had a policy of inviting young climbers on his aid / climbing expeditions to Nepal. In 1964 he completed the first ascent of Thamserku with Lynn Crawford, Pete Farrell, Richard Stewart and Phu Dorje Sherpa as part of Edmund Hillary's Schoolhouse Expedition.

In 1966 he returned to Nepal with his wife Diane McKinnon and on 18 November became the first volunteer doctor to staff Kunde Hospital.

After returning to New Zealand he trained to be an ophthalmologist. Working on corneal survival and the impact of herpes simplex virus on the eye

John McKinnon is the author of "Homeland of the Buddha, A guide to the Buddhist holy places of India and Nepal" in which he shares his knowledge of Asia and understanding of Buddhism.
