= Kunde, Nepal =

Village in Nepal

Coordinates: 27°49′23″N 86°42′26″E

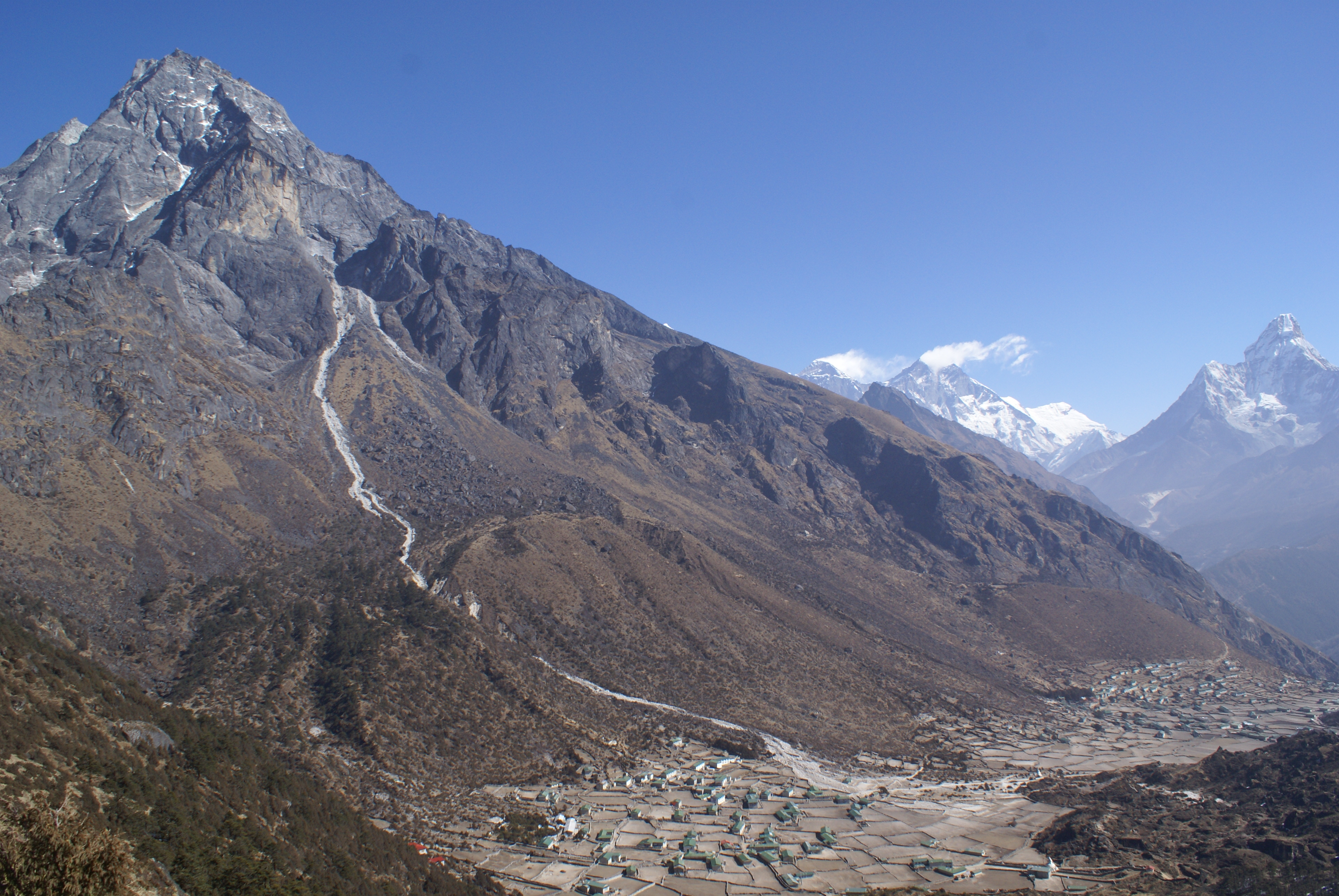
The Khumbila mountain rising above Khumjung and Khunde, two of the larger villages in the area, with Mount Everest, Lhotse and Ama Dablam in the background.

Khunde (Nepali: खुन्दे) is a village in the Khumbu region of Nepal within the Sagarmatha National Park. It is directly adjacent to Khumjung village in the valley at the foot of Khumbu Yül-Lha, the sacred mountain of the Sherpas. The Khumjung Valley is located between 3,800 m and 4,000 m above sea level. Khunde is located in the western part of the valley and slightly higher than Khumjung. It is the site of Kunde Hospital, founded by Sir Edmund Hillary in 1966. Khunde is located less than 25 km from Mount Everest and is situated in the Himalayas near the Nepal-China border.
