= James McKinnon (historian) =

James McKinnon FRSE (1860-1945) was a writer on history and church history. He was Professor of Church History at the University of Edinburgh from 1908 to 1930.

== Life ==
He was born on 15 July 1860 on the Ardmiddle estate near Turriff in northern Aberdeenshire, the son of Barbara Hay Black and her husband Alexander MacKinnon, the land steward of the estate.

He was educated at Ardmiddle Public School and Turriff Parish School and then went to the University of Edinburgh but initially did not complete his degree. He instead travelled to South Africa 1881 to 1884, for health reasons, where he studied Arts and Divinity at the Theological College of the Dutch Reformed Church at Stellenbosch University. He returned to Scotland to complete his degree at the University of Edinburgh eventually graduating with an MA in 1889. He undertook further postgraduate studies in Germany, at the University of Bonn and Heidelberg University gaining a PhD in the latter in 1891.

In 1886 he had been licensed to preach as a Church of Scotland minister by the Presbytery of Turriff and served as a locum in St Andrew's Church in Dundee then in the Abbey Church in Edinburgh. In 1890 he moved to Glasgow having obtained a post as a lecturer in history at Queen Margaret College, Glasgow. He then began lecturing in history at the University of Edinburgh and the University of St Andrews, from 1893 being an examiner for history exams at Edinburgh. In 1896 he was appointed senior lecturer in History at St Andrews. In 1908 he returned to University of Edinburgh as Professor of Church History in place of Rev Prof Malcolm Campbell Taylor.

In 1910 he was elected a fellow of the Royal Society of Edinburgh. His proposers were Sir William Turner, George Chrystal, Cargill Gilston Knott and Sir Frank Watson Dyson. In the same year he became a Director of the Royal Blind Asylum in Edinburgh and a Governor of Steill's Educational Trust. He was awarded a Doctor of Divinity by the University of St Andrews in 1912.

He was President of the International Historical Congress in London in 1913.

He retired in 1930 and was thereafter given the title of Regius Professor. He died at Thornlea House in Forfar on 12 July 1945, aged 85.

== Publications ==
- South African Traits ( 1887)
- Culture in Early Scotland (1892)
- The Union of England and Scotland (1896)
- The History of Edward III (1900)
- The Growth and Decline of the French Monarchy (1902)
- A History of Modern Liberty (1906)
- The Social and Industrial History of Scotland (1920)
- Constitutional History of Scotland to the Reformation (1924)
- Luther and the Reformation (1925)

== Family ==
In December 1886 he married Pauline Klein, daughter of F. Klein from Cologne. They had one son, James Alexander Rudolph MacKinnon (b.1888) an advocate who later served as Sheriff Substitute for Forfarshire.
