= Donnie McKinnon =

Scottish footballer

Personal information
- Full name: Donald MacKinnon
- Date of birth: 20 August 1940 (age 86)
- Place of birth: Glasgow, Scotland
- Height: 6 ft 0 in (1.83 m)
- Position: Defender

Youth career
- Govan Juveniles

Senior career*
Years	Team	Apps	(Gls)
–	Rutherglen Glencairn		
1959–1973	Partick Thistle	224	(1)
- * Club domestic league appearances and goals

Donald MacKinnon, commonly known as Donnie McKinnon (born 20 August 1940) is a Scottish former professional footballer who played for Partick Thistle.

== Career ==
A central defender, McKinnon was raised in Govan but as a child during World War II spent some time on the Isle of Lewis where his mother was born. Having joined Partick Thistle in 1959 from Junior club Rutherglen Glencairn, he made his debut against St Johnstone on 4 March 1961 in a 3–0 win at Firhill. He went on to make 321 appearances for the Jags in all competitions before becoming a physiotherapist at the club, a role he remained in until retiring in 1989; he was granted a testimonial match against Manchester United in November 1973. He did not take part in Thistle's most famous occasion of the era, the 1971 Scottish League Cup Final victory.

He also performed physio duties for the Scotland national squad, including at the 1978 and 1982 World Cup finals.

In 1980, McKinnon was the football coach in the film Gregory's Girl.

== Personal life ==
McKinnon's twin brother Ronnie was also a professional footballer and a centre-half, being an important member of the Rangers team of the same era and being selected for Scotland 28 times.

== See also ==
- List of one-club men in association football
