= Jon MacKinnon =

Canadian field hockey player

Jon MacKinnon (born November 17, 1977, in Winnipeg, Manitoba) is a field hockey goalkeeper from Canada. MacKinnon joined the Junior National Team in 1994 and later served on the Men's National Team.

== International senior competitions ==
- 2001 – World Cup Qualifier, Edinburgh (8th)
- 2002 – Commonwealth Games, Manchester (6th)
- 2003 – Pan American Games, Santo Domingo (2nd)
- 2004 – Olympic Qualifying Tournament, Madrid (11th)
- 2004 – Pan Am Cup, London (2nd)
