= Khumbu =

Region in northeastern Nepal

Coordinates: 27°48′18″N 86°42′36″E

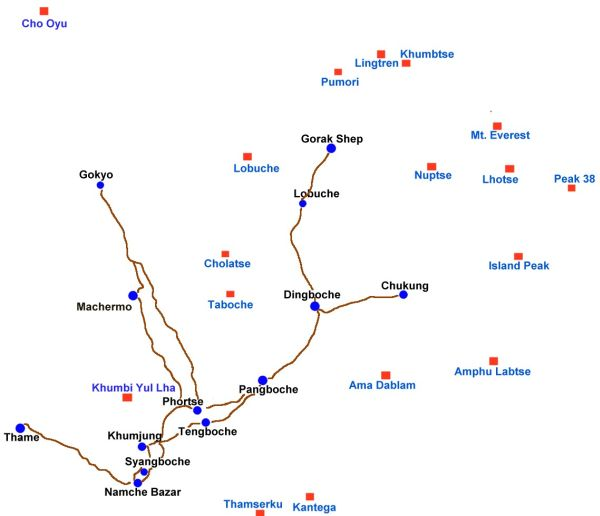
Map of the Khumbu region

Khumbu (also known as the Everest Region) is a region of northeastern Nepal on the Nepalese side of Mount Everest. It is part of the Solukhumbu District, which in turn is part of Koshi Province. Khumbu is one of three subregions of the main Kirat Rai (Khambu) and Sherpa settlement of the Himalaya, the other two being Solu and Pharak. It includes the town of Namche Bazaar as well as the villages of Thame, Khumjung, Pangboche, Pheriche and Kunde. The famous Buddhist monastery at Tengboche is also located in Khumbu.

Khumbu's elevation ranges from 3,300 metres (11,000 feet) to the 8,848.86 m (29,032 ft) summit of Mount Everest, the highest place on Earth. In total, Khumbu region has the population of 3,456 people with 912 houses (As per population census of 2011). Also, there are 347 registered hotel and tea houses in 13 villages of Khumbu. The Khumbu region includes both Sagarmatha National Park (above Monju) and the Sagarmatha National Park Buffer Zone, between Lukla and Monju.

Khumbu is a glacier believed to be the result of the last great Ice Age, ~500,000 years ago.

Lonely Planet ranked Khumbu region as the sixth best region in the world to travel.

Sherpa clans in Khumbu Region are Salakha, Murminso, Thaktok, Garza, Lhakshindo, Chusherwa or Ngonba, Luakpa or Chawa, Sakhya, Shyango

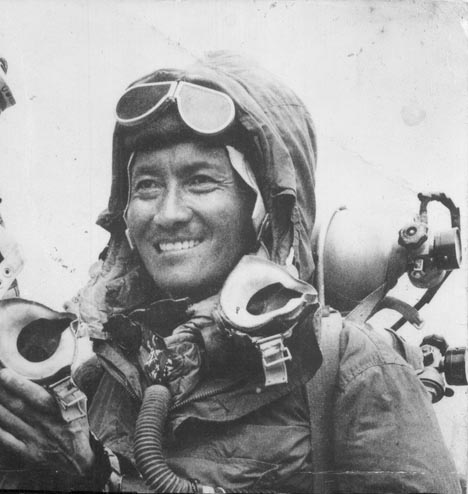
Tenzing Norgay, 1953 who was born in Khumbu region of Solukhumbu District, Nepal

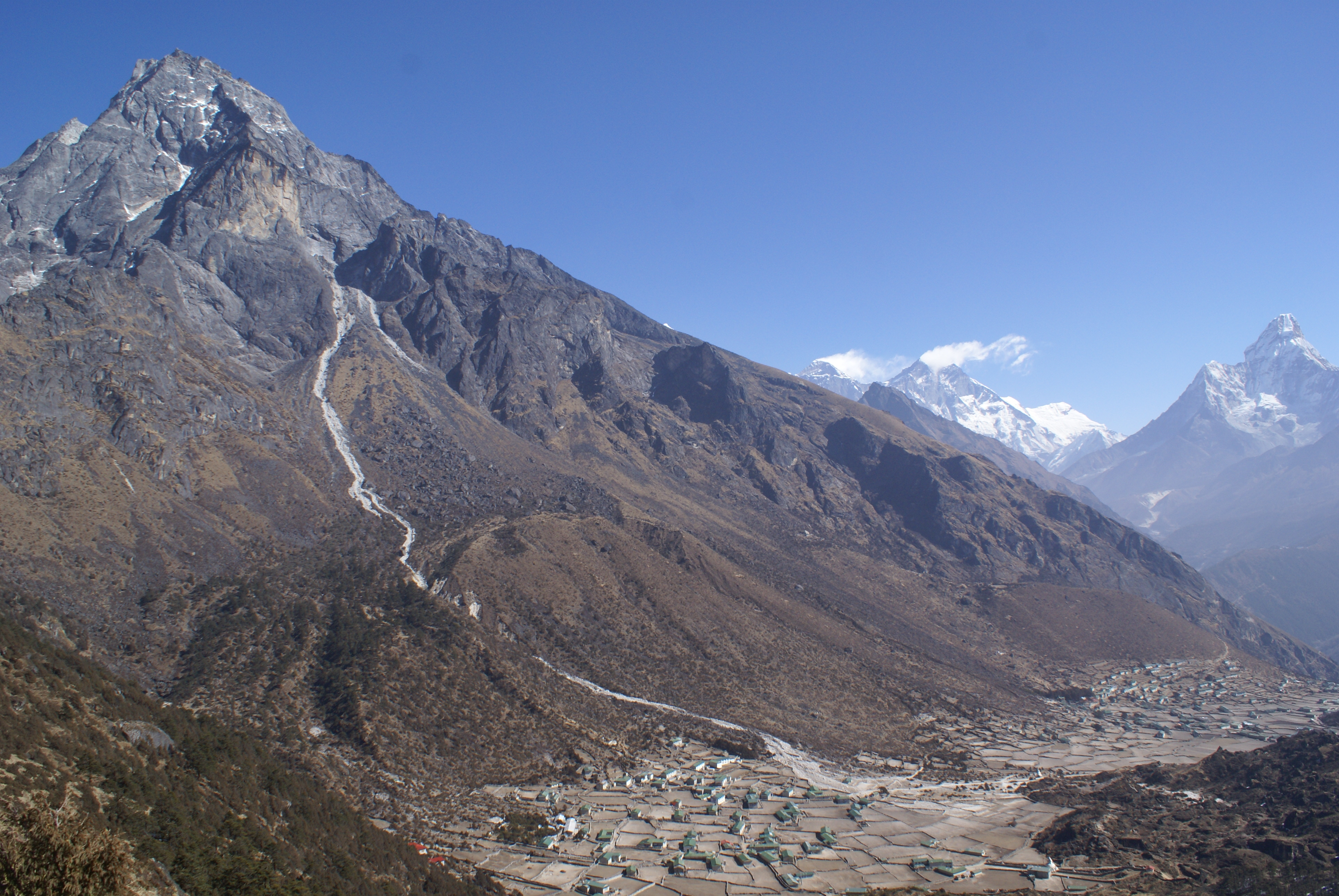
The Khumbila mountain rising above Khumjung and Kunde, two of the larger villages in the area, with Mount Everest, Lhotse and Ama Dablam in the background.

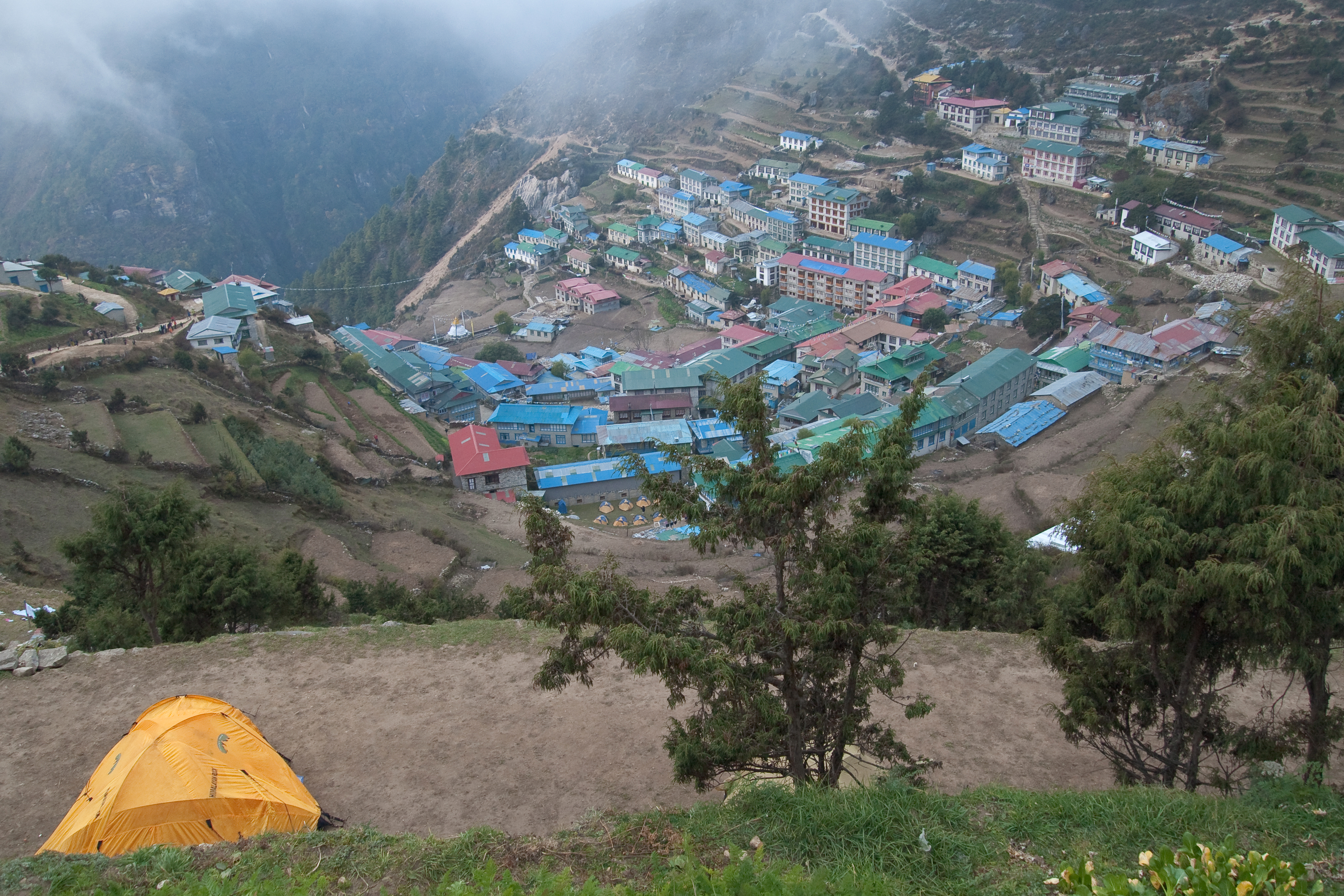
Village of Namche Bazaar

== Villages in the Khumbu region ==
- Dingboche
- Kunde
- Khumjung
- Lobuche
- Lukla
- Namche Bazaar
- Syangboche with Syangboche Airport
- Tengboche
- Phortse
- Thame
- Thamo
- Pangboche
- Phakding
- Pheriche
- Monjo
