= Clevenger =

Clevenger is a surname. Notable people with the surname include:

- Claudia Clevenger (born 1955), American former competition swimmer and world record-holder
- Cliff Clevenger (1885–1960), United States Representative from Ohio
- Craig Clevenger, American author of contemporary fiction
- Dale Clevenger (1940–2022), principal horn of the Chicago Symphony Orchestra
- Ean Elliot Clevenger, multi-instrumentalist, vocalist, and songwriter for A-F Record's political hardcore-punk band Pipedown
- Helen Clevenger (died 1936), American college student murdered in Asheville, North Carolina
- Jeremy Clevenger, American politician
- Joseph Clevenger (born 1980), American educator and superintendent
- Raymond C. Clevenger (born 1937), American federal judge
- Raymond F. Clevenger (1926–2016), U.S. Representative from the U.S. state of Michigan
- Shobal Vail Clevenger (1812–1843), United States sculptor
- Shobal Vail Clevenger Jr. (1843–1920), American physician who specialized in nervous and mental diseases
- Steve Clevenger (born 1986), Major League Baseball catcher
- Sylvia Clevenger (1891–1951), American prostitute, minor associate of the John Dillinger gang
- Tex Clevenger (1932–2019), Major League Baseball relief pitcher/spot starter
- Vern Clevenger (born 1955), climber and landscape photographer
- Zora Clevenger (1881–1970), American football, basketball, and baseball player, coach, and athletic director

== See also ==
- Clevinger (disambiguation)
