= Thomas Buchanan Read =

American poet and painter (1822-1872)

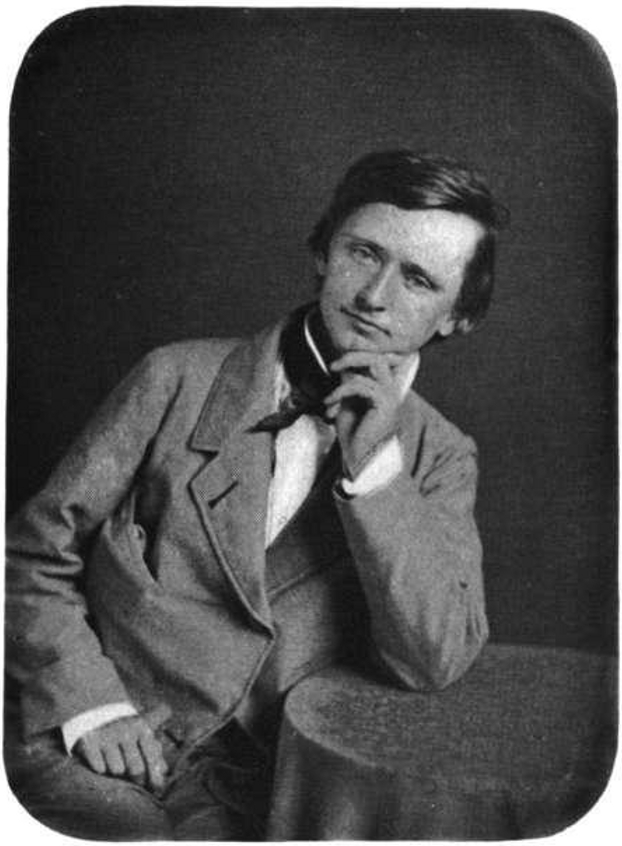
- Thomas Buchanan Read at age 28
- Born: March 12, 1822; Corner Ketch, Pennsylvania, U.S.
- Died: May 11, 1872 (aged 50)
- Resting place: Laurel Hill Cemetery, Philadelphia, Pennsylvania, U.S.
- Occupations: Poet, painter, writer
- Spouses: Mary J. Pratt; Harriet Denison
- Children: 3

Thomas Buchanan Read (March 12, 1822 – May 11, 1872) was an American poet and painter. His portraits include many famous individuals including Robert Browning, Joseph Harrison Jr., William Henry Harrison, Abraham Lincoln, Henry Wadsworth Longfellow, and Alfred Tennyson.

He first achieved national prominence in Cincinnati, Ohio. He studied under sculptor Shobal Vail Clevenger and opened an art studio sponsored by wealthy horticulturist Nicholas Longworth. He chafed under criticism from Longworth and moved to Boston, Massachusetts, where he befriended poet Henry Wadsworth Longfellow and painter Washington Allston. He moved to Rome, Italy, and opened a studio, but achieved most of his artistic success while living in Florence, Italy. He was briefly associated with the Pre-Raphaelite Brotherhood. He returned to the United States during the American Civil War and served as a major in the Union Army.

His most well known poem, "Sheridan's Ride", depicts Union General Philip Sheridan's charge at the Battle of Cedar Creek during the American Civil War. Read gave recitations of the poem to the public and troops to build support for the war in the North. The poem's popularity also prompted the creation of several paintings by Read depicting the scene.

== Early life and education ==
Read was born on March 12, 1822, in Corner Ketch, a hamlet near Downingtown, Pennsylvania. He received only an elementary school level of education. After the death of his father, he apprenticed with a local tailor then moved to Philadelphia and worked as a grocer and tobacconist. At age 15, he moved to Cincinnati, Ohio, to live with his sister. He worked painting signs and apprenticed under sculptor Shobal Vail Clevenger. He also worked as an actor impersonating female roles due to his slight build.

== Career ==
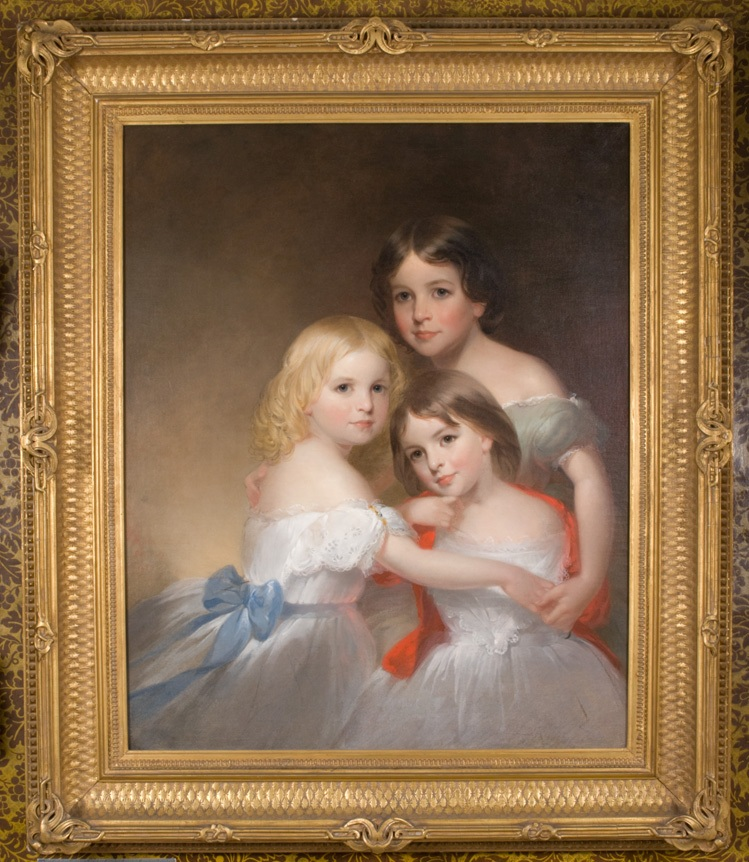
Read's painting of the three daughters of Henry Wadsworth Longfellow is considered one of his best works

In Cincinnati, Read established a portrait studio with the assistance of the wealthy horticulturist Nicholas Longworth. In 1840, he gained national prominence through his portrait of Whig presidential candidate William Henry Harrison. He also published his first poetry collection in the Cincinnati Chronicle and Times. He parted ways with Longworth due to criticism of his work. In 1841, he moved to Boston, Massachusetts, and became friends with poet Henry Wadsworth Longfellow and painter Washington Allston. Longfellow hired Read to paint a portrait of his daughters which is considered one of his best works.

In 1843, he published a series of poems in the Boston Courier which later became the basis for the book Lays and Ballads.

In 1846 he moved back to Philadelphia and in 1850, he moved to Rome, Italy, where he opened a studio and achieved success in art and literature. He returned to the United States in 1861 at the outbreak of the American Civil War and joined the Union Army. He served as a major on the staff of General Lew Wallace and gave public performances of his war songs to rally the Union troops. After one such performance, future president General James A. Garfield wrote to Read and thanked him for "the pleasure of hearing your words".

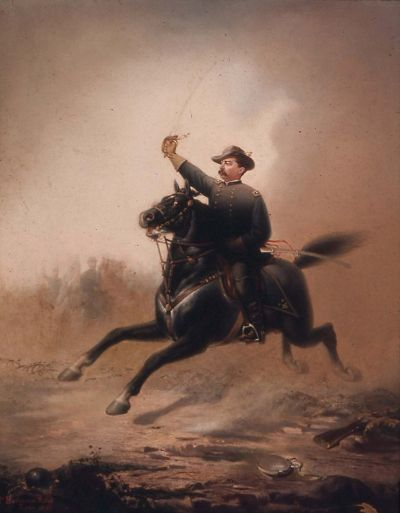
The popularity of the poem "Sheridan's Ride" prompted the Union League of Philadelphia to sponsor Read to create a painting depicting the scene. Read created multiple versions of the same image including this one in 1871

His most famous poem is Sheridan's Ride, which depicts Union General Philip Sheridan's cavalry charge at the Battle of Cedar Creek during the American Civil War. It was printed in the New York Tribune on election day 1864 on the front page and may have impacted the margin of victory for Abraham Lincoln. The work proved so popular, he was asked by the Union League of Philadelphia to create a painting of the subject matter. He ended up making several copies of the painting, 17 of which still exist.

President Ulysses S. Grant purchased the painting of Sheridan's Ride with the intent to hang it in the White House. It remained with the Grant family until 1939, when it was donated to the National Portrait Gallery of the Smithsonian Institution.

His portrait work also includes Robert Browning, Joseph Harrison Jr., Abraham Lincoln, Henry Wadsworth Longfellow, Alfred Tennyson, and the Queen of Naples. Over the course of his career, he produced 60 significant paintings from studios in the United States, Düsseldorf, Florence, Liverpool, London, Manchester and Rome.

Read also wrote a prose romance, The Pilgrims of the Great St. Bernard, and several books of poetry, including The New Pastoral, The House by the Sea, Sylvia, and A Summer Story. Some of the shorter pieces include Drifting, The Angler, The Oath, and The Closing Scene. Read was briefly associated with the Pre-Raphaelite Brotherhood. His greatest artistic popularity took place in Florence, Italy where he was colleagues with other writers and artists such as Joel Tanner Hart, Hiram Powers, George Sand, and Frances Milton Trollope.

In 1871, Read sustained serious injuries from a carriage accident and never fully recovered. He returned to the United States in 1872 but contracted pneumonia during the journey and died soon after arriving at port in New York City. He was interred at Laurel Hill Cemetery in Philadelphia.

== Personal life ==
In 1843, Read married Mary J. Pratt and together they had three children. During a trip to Italy in 1853, his wife and daughter died due to illness. He was remarried in 1867 to Harriet Dennison.

== Legacy ==
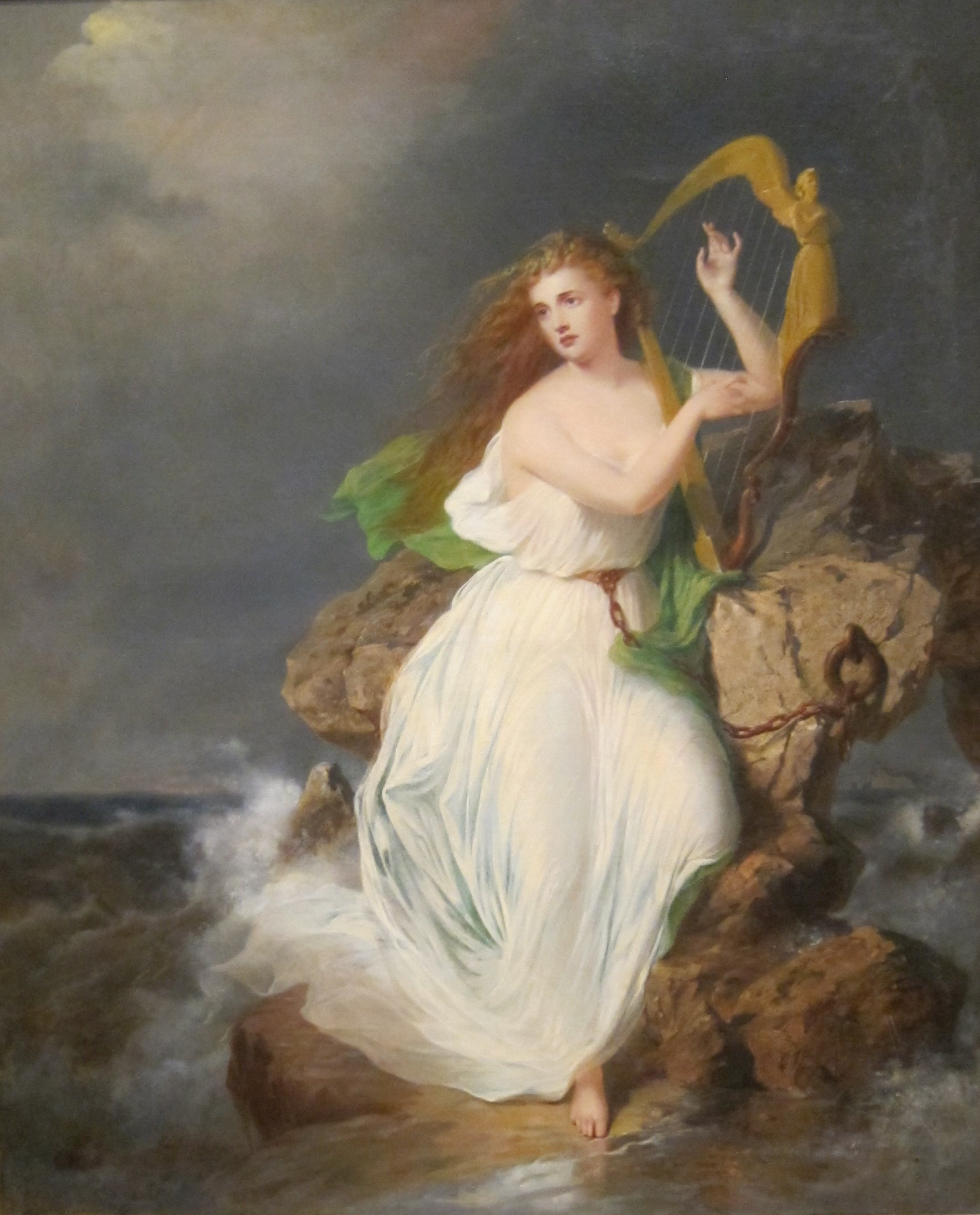
Read's The Harp of Erin (1867) is held in the collection of the Cincinnati Art Museum

Three of his paintings are held in the collection of the Cincinnati Art Museum - The Harp of Erin, Hero and Portrait of an Old Man. His painting of Longfellow's children is in the New York Metropolitan Museum of Art and a self-portrait is in the Washington National Gallery of Art. The Pennsylvania Academy of the Fine Arts has two of his paintings in their collection: a portrait of Joseph Harrison Jr. and The Flight of the Arrow.

In 1908, the Thomas Buchanan Read School in the Elmwood Park neighborhood of Philadelphia was named in his honor.

In 1922, the Chester County Historical Society erected a historical marker near the home where Read was born.

== Literary works ==
- Paul Redding: A Tale of the Brandywine, Boston: A. Tompkins and B.B. Mussey, 1845
- Poems, Philadelphia: Parry & M'Millan, 1847
- The Female Poets of America With Portraits, Biographical Notices, and Specimens of Their Writings. 1849
- Lays and Ballads, Philadelphia: George S. Appleton, 1849
- Thoraren the Skald. 1850
- The Stolen Child. 1850
- Edward A. Brackett's Marble Group of the Shipwrecked Mother and Child. 1852
- The Pilgrims of the Great St. Bernard. 1853
- The New Pastoral., Philadelphia: Parry & M'Millan 1855
- The House by the Sea. A Poem., Philadelphia: Parry & McMillan, 1855
- Sylvia, or, The Last Shepherd An Eclogue, and Other Poems. 1857
- Rural Poems., London: Longman, Brown, Green, Longmans, & Roberts, 1857
- James L. Claghorn, Esq. 1860
- A Summer Story, Sheridan's Ride and Other Poems., Philadelphia: J.B. Lippincott & Co., 1865
- The Descent of the Eagle. 1865
- The Soldier's Friend. 1865
- The Eagle and the Vulture. 1866
- The Poetical Works of Thomas Buchanan Read: Complete in Three Volumes. 1867
