= Cholatse =

Mountain in Khumbu, Nepal

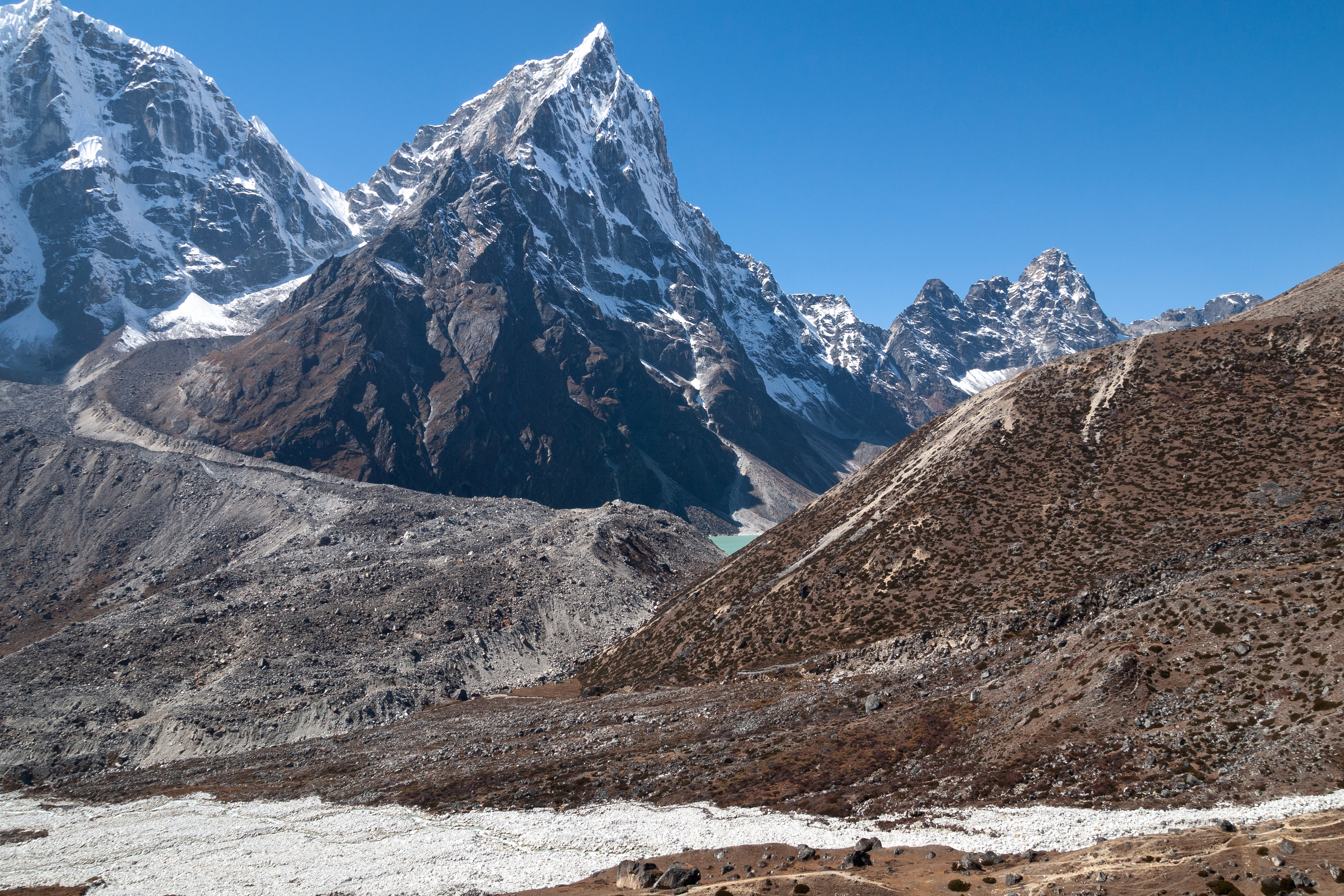
- Cholatse from the east

Highest point
- Elevation: 6,440 m (21,130 ft)
- Prominence: 726 m (2,382 ft)
- Coordinates: 27°55′12″N 86°45′58″E

Geography
- Location within Nepal
- Location: Khumbu, Nepal
- Parent range: Khumbu Himal

Climbing
- First ascent: 1982 by Vern Clevenger, Galen Rowell, John Roskelley, Bill O'Conner, and Peter Hackett
- Easiest route: glacier/snow/ice climb

Cholatse (Nepali: चोलात्से), also known as Jobo Lhaptshan, is a mountain in the Khumbu region of the Nepalese Himalaya. Cholatse is connected to Taboche (6,501m) by a long ridge, with the Chola glacier descending from the mountain's east face. The north and east faces of Cholatse can be seen from Dughla, on the trail to Mount Everest base camp.

There is a lake just below this pass to the east, and in Tibetan 'cho' is lake, 'la' is pass, and 'tse' is peak so Cholatse means literally "lake pass peak". Cholatse was first climbed via the southwest ridge on 22 April 1982, by Vern Clevenger, Galen Rowell, John Roskelley, Bill O'Connor and Peter Hackett. The mountain's north face was first climbed in 1984.

== Notable ascents ==
- 1982 East Face — first ascent of Cholatse (Vern Clevenger, Galen Rowell, John Roskelly, Bill O'Connor and Peter Hackett)
- 1984 North Face — first ascent of Cholatse by the north face
- 1996 North Face – First ascent by a French team (Boris Badaroux, Philippe Batoux, Marc Challamel, Christophe Mora, Paul Robach (leader)). The climb took three days, the route (IV+, 90°, 1600m) started at the center of the north face, with sharp turns to the right at the beginning, then left at the middle and finally taking a turn to the right to join the northwest ridge that led the team to the summit.
- 2005 North Face – first ascent in winter by Korean team (Park Jung-hun, Choi Gang-sik), 16 January 2005.
- 2005 North Face – first solo ascent, by Ueli Steck, 15 April 2005.
- 2005 Southwest Ridge – summit reached by Kevin Thaw, Conrad Anker, Kris Erickson, John Griber and Abby Watkins on 12 May 2005.
- 2010 North Face (new variant) – A team (Galya Cibitoke, Alexander Gukov, Sergei Kondrashkin, Viktor Koval, and Valery Shamalo) from St. Petersburg, Russia, made an ascent of a new variant of the north face at the end of the calendar winter. The route ascended a huge rock buttress on the right of the French route of 1996, which it joined at ca.5,900m. The route's difficulty was Russian 6B, VI+, A2, 80°, 1,600m.
- 2021 North Face left flank – Five members from an eight-member French expedition opened a new route on the left flank of Cholatse's north face/northeast face. After five days of climbing (25–29 October), the French reached the top. The route was named Brothers In Arms (ED, VI, M5+, WI5, 1,600m) and was dedicated to three of their colleagues (Thomas Arfi, Gabriel Miloche and Louis Pachoud) who went missing after an avalanche on Mingbo Eiger (6,070m) southeast of Ama Dablam on 26 October.

== Gallery ==
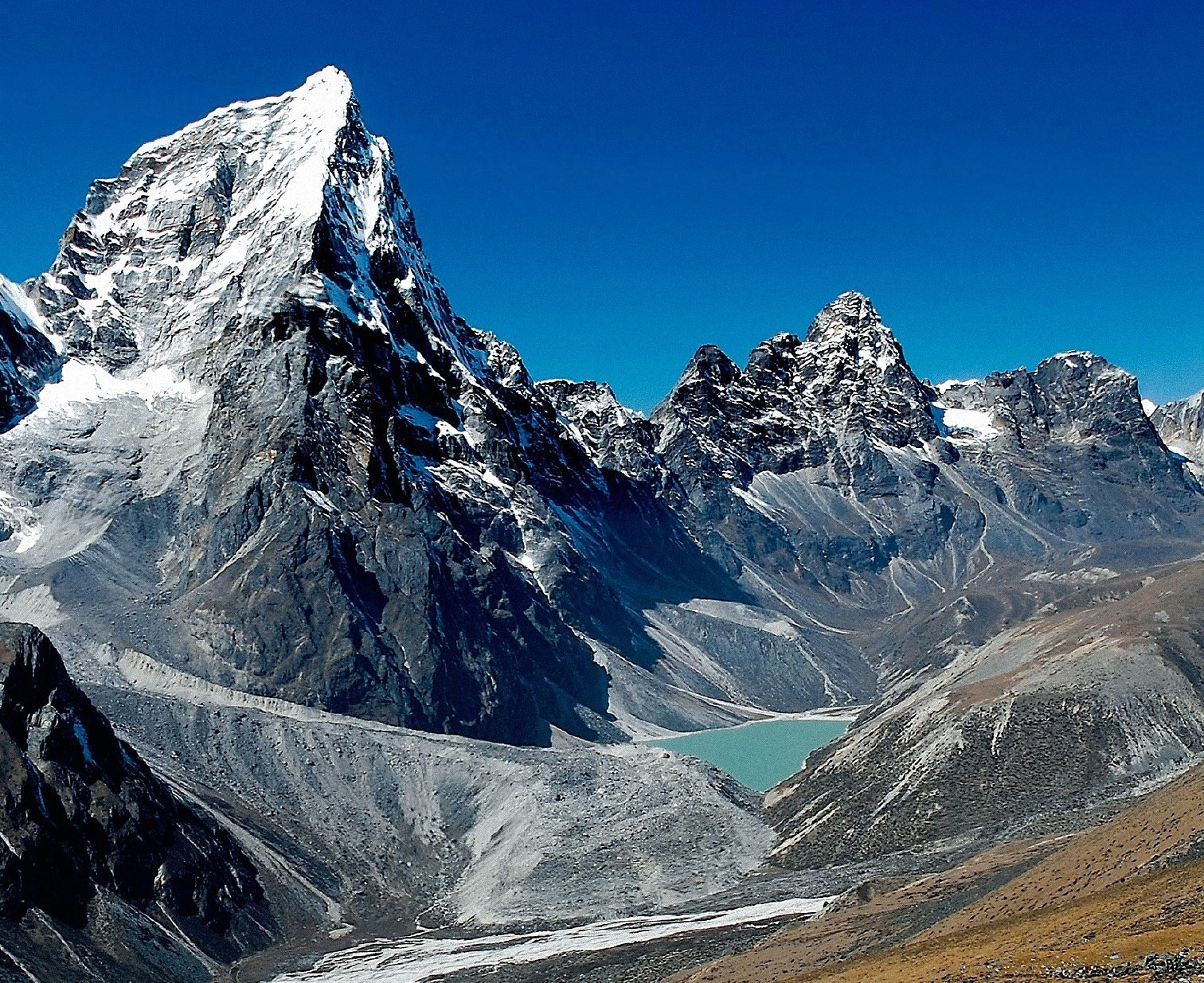
Cholatse (left) and Arakam Tse (right)

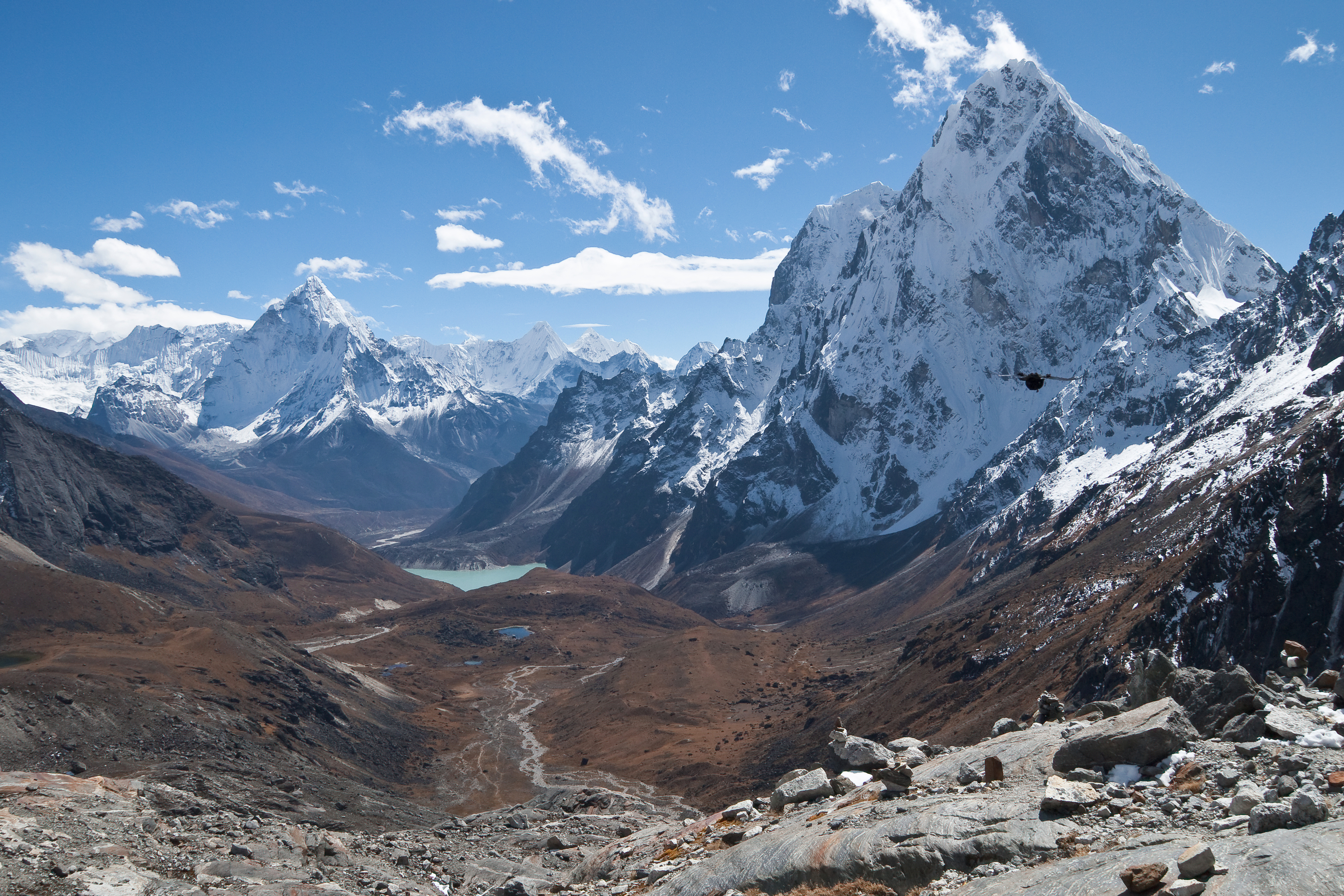
Cholatse from Cho La Pass

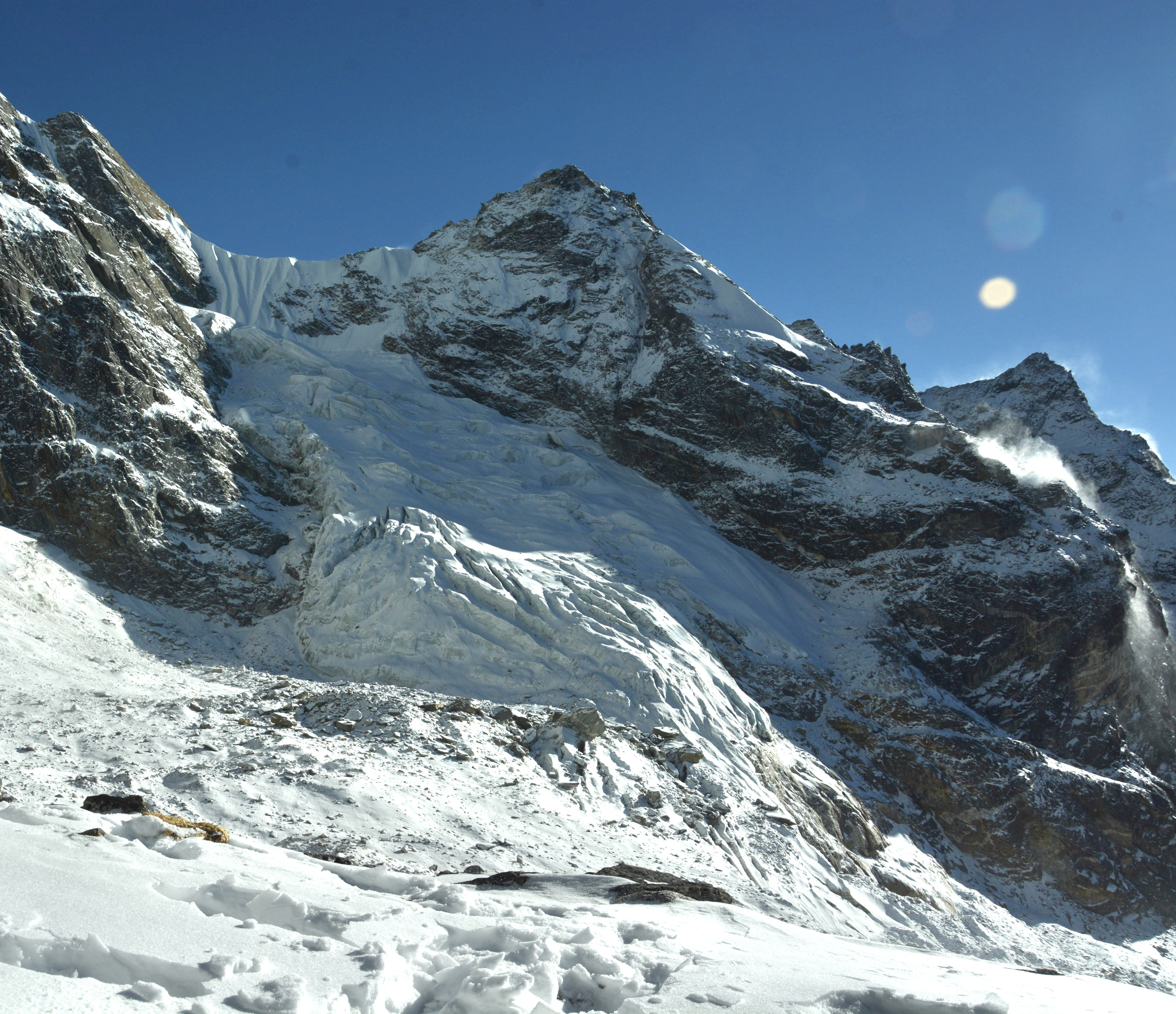
The icefall below the headwall on the normal route (southwest-west ridge) during winter

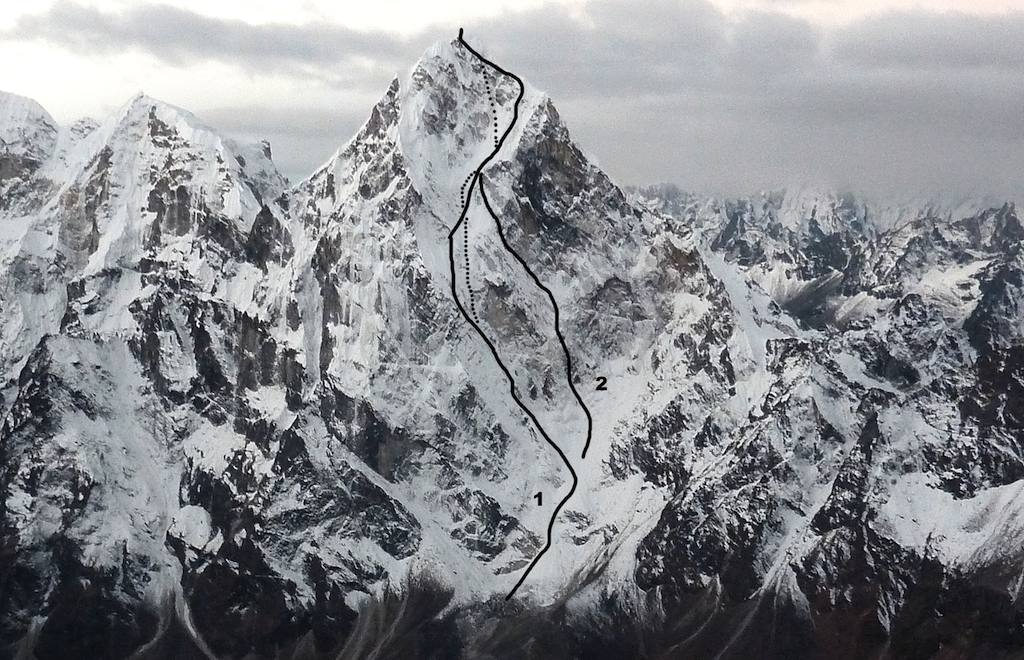
North face of Cholatse seen from Lobuche East. (1) French Route (Badaroux-Batoux-Challamel-Mora-Robach, 1995). The dotted line shows the Korean variations during the first winter ascent (Park Jung-hun-Chai Kang-sik, 2005). (2) 2010 Russian Route. (Credit:Joel Kauffman)

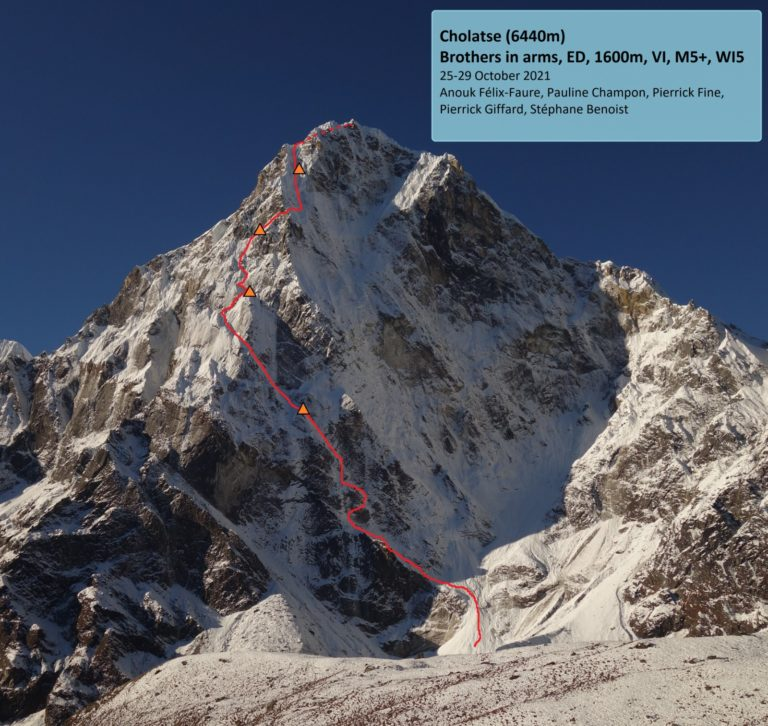
"Brothers In Arms" route

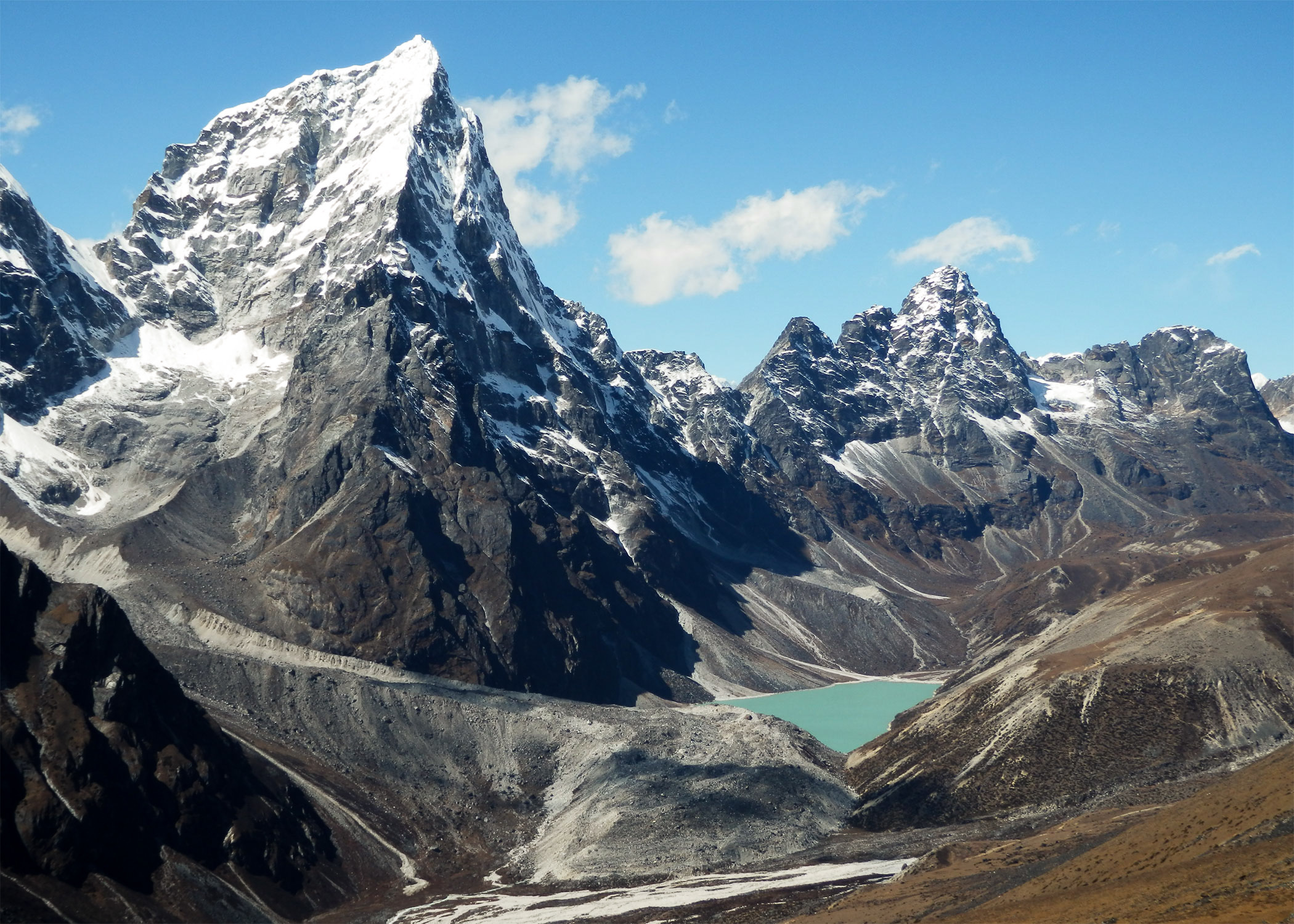
Cholatse (left) and Arakam Tse (right)
