= Clevinger =

Clevinger may refer to:

- Brian Clevinger (born 1978), American writer
- Mike Clevinger, American baseball pitcher
- Clevinger, a character from the novel Catch-22

== See also ==
- Clevenger (surname page)
- Levinger
