= Arakam Tse =

Mountain in Khumbu, Nepal

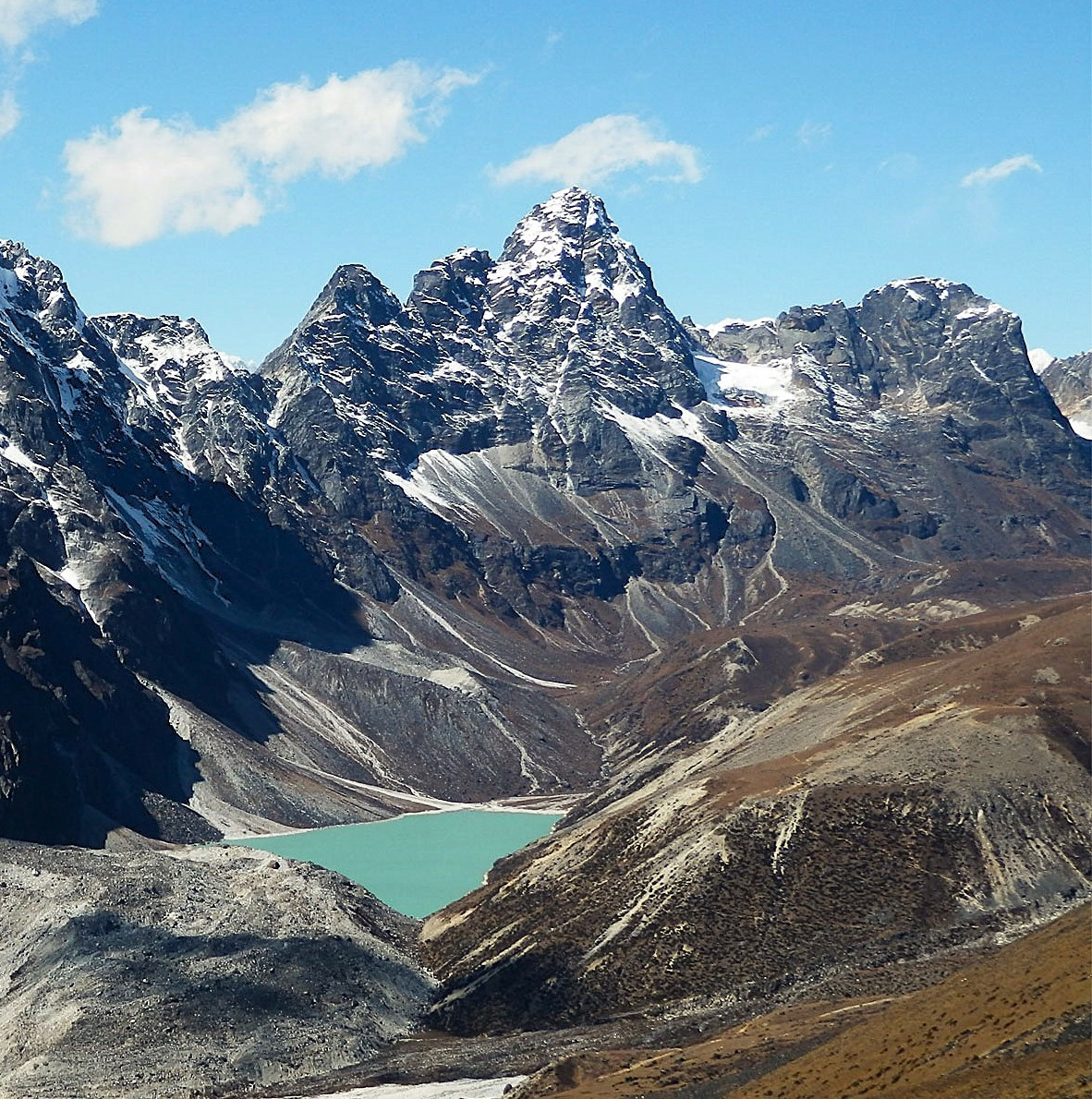
- Southeast aspect

Highest point
- Elevation: 5,904 m (19,370 ft)
- Prominence: 546 m (1,791 ft)
- Coordinates: 27°56′30″N 86°45′10″E

Geography
- Location within Nepal
- Interactive map of Arakam Tse
- Location: Khumbu
- Country: Nepal
- Province: Koshi
- District: Solukhumbu
- Protected area: Sagarmatha National Park
- Parent range: Himalaya

Climbing
- First ascent: 2013
- Easiest route: class VI/5+

Arakam Tse is a mountain in Nepal.

== Description ==
Arakam Tse is a 5,904-metre (19,370-foot) summit in the Khumbu region of the Nepalese Himalaya. It is situated 17 kilometres (11 mi) west of Mount Everest and two kilometres (1.2 mi) north of Cholatse. Topographic relief is significant as the east slope rises 1,100 metres (3,609 ft) in one kilometre (0.62 mi). Precipitation runoff from the mountain's slopes drains into tributaries of the Dudh Koshi. Trekkers pass by this peak en route to Everest Base Camp. The first ascent of the summit was made on October 26, 2013, by Josep Maria Esquirol, Silvestre Barrientos, Alfonso Gaston, and Ferran Rodríguez. This team of Spaniards climbed the northeast face via a route they named Tatopani, (1,000m, class VI/5+ M5+).

== Climate ==
Based on the Köppen climate classification, Arakam Tse is located in a tundra climate zone with cold, snowy winters, and cool summers. Weather systems coming off the Bay of Bengal are forced upwards by the Himalaya mountains (orographic lift), causing heavy precipitation in the form of rainfall and snowfall. Mid-June through early-August is the monsoon season. The months of April, May, September, and October offer the most favorable weather for viewing or climbing this peak.

== Gallery ==
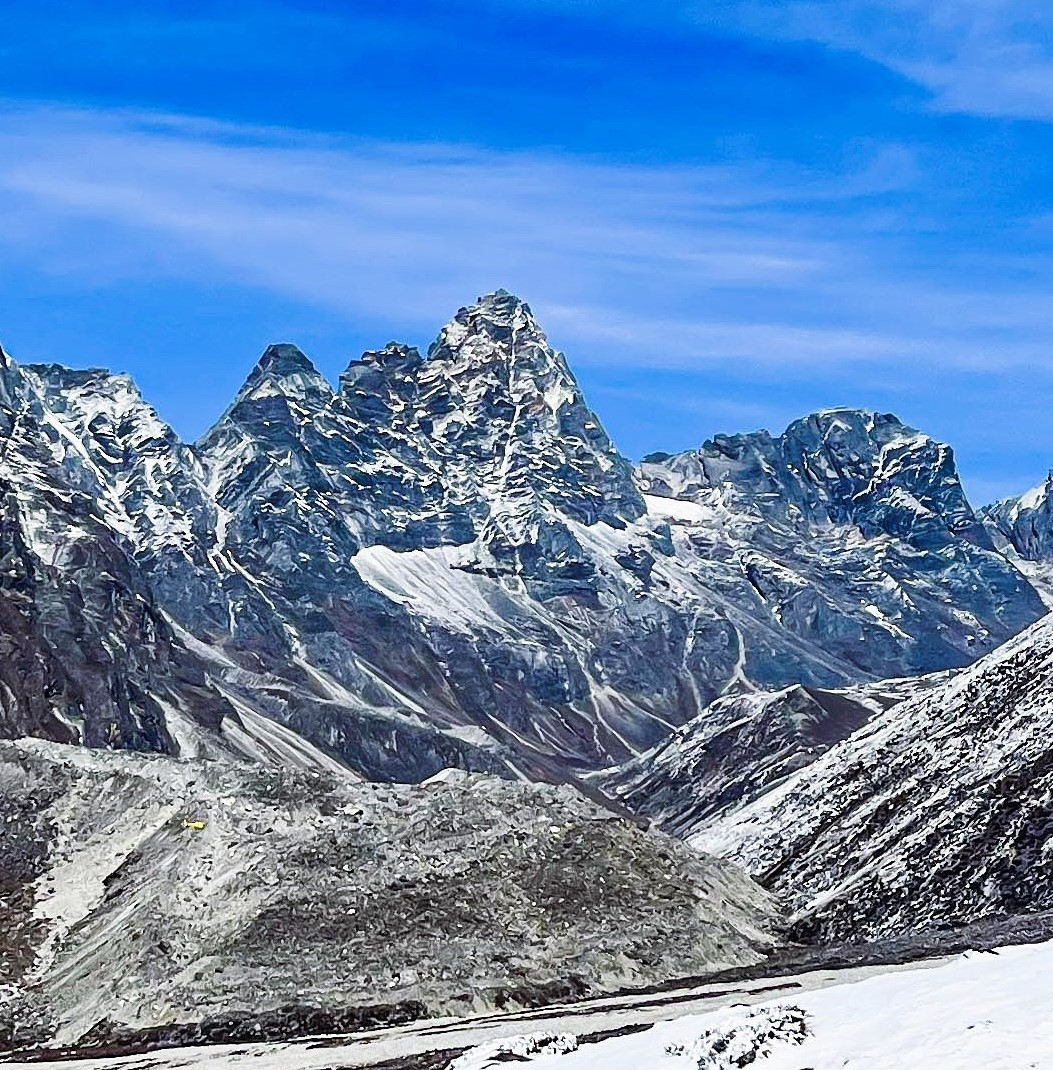
Southeast aspect

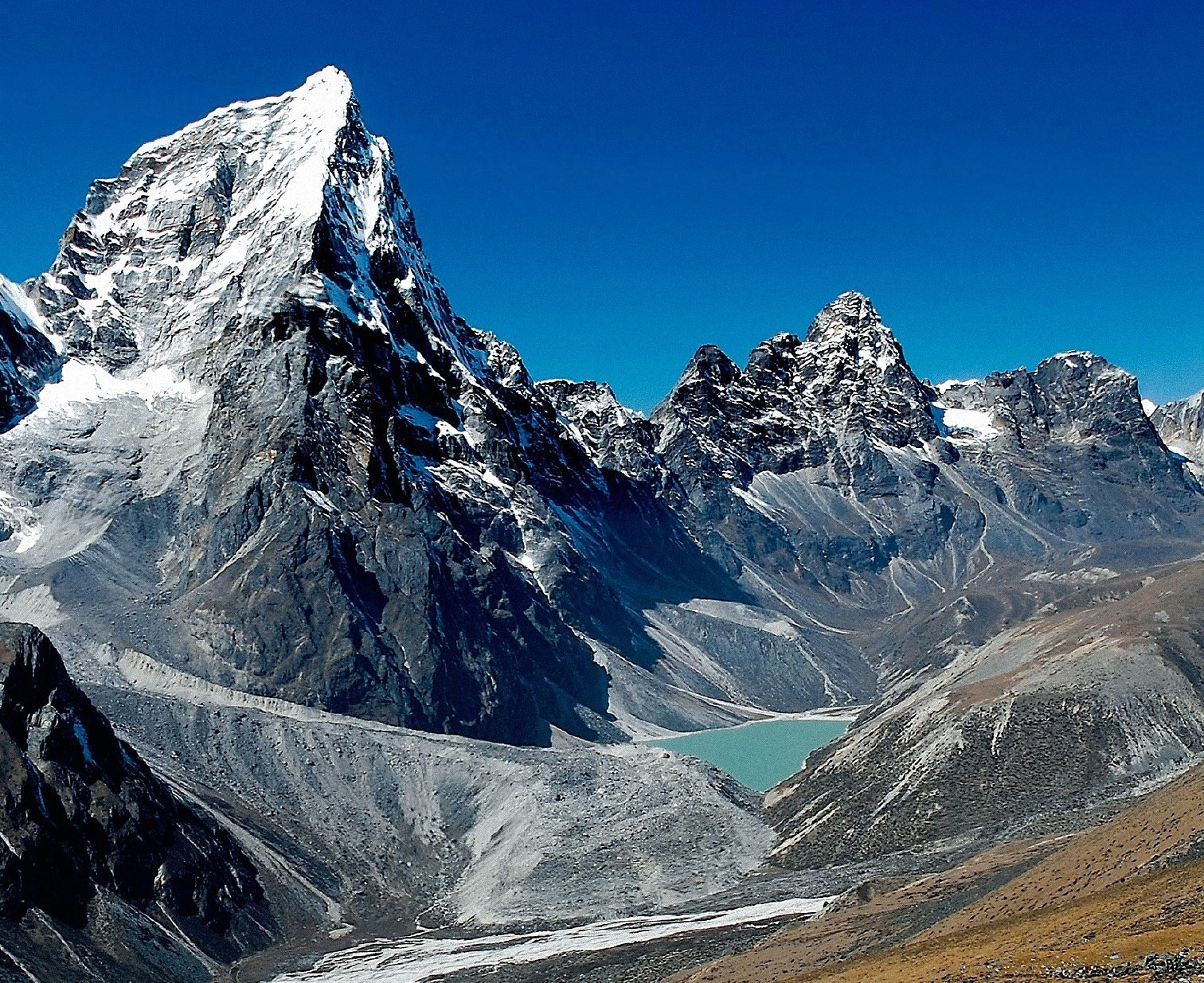
Cholatse (left) and Arakam Tse (right)

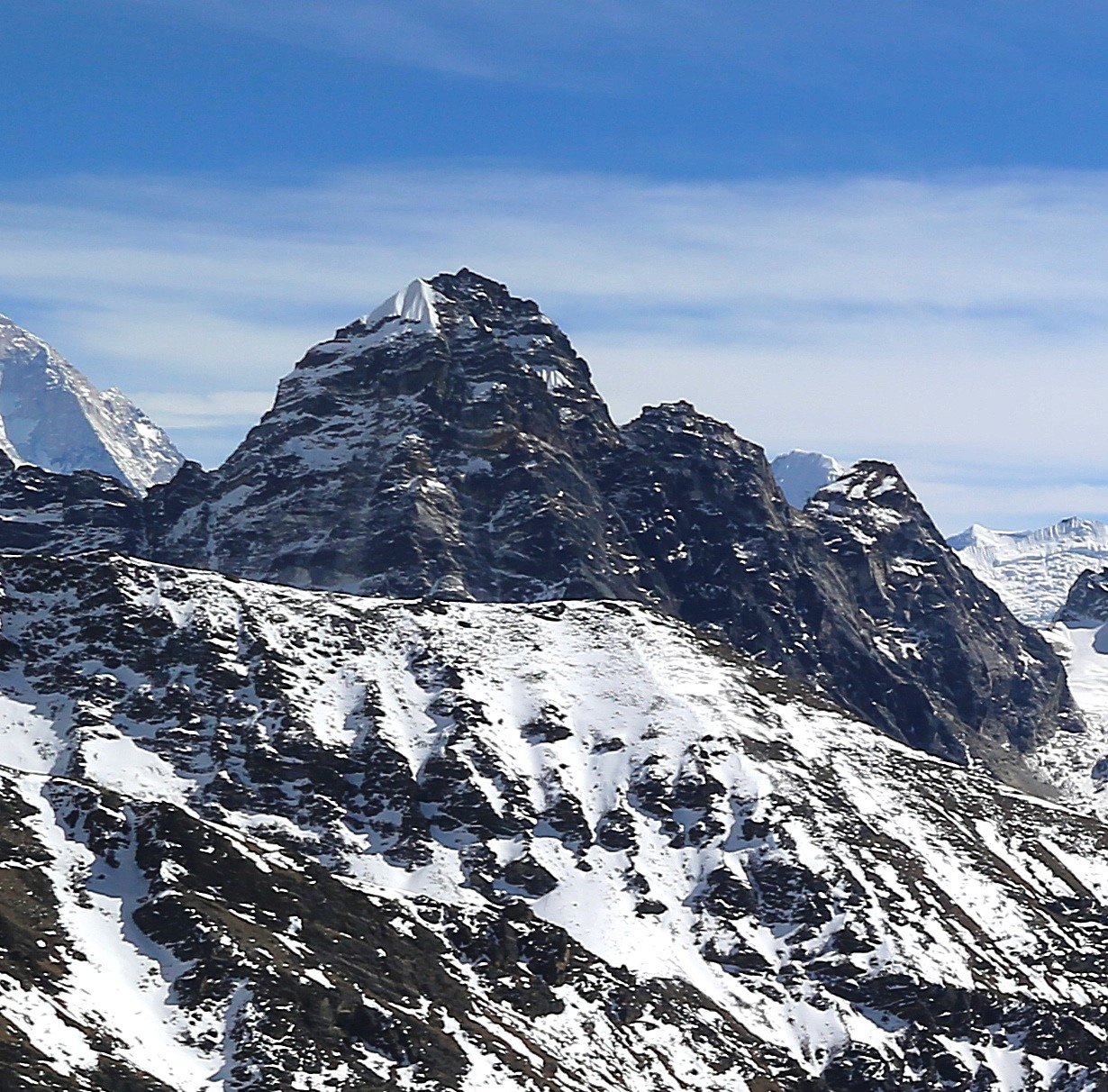
West aspect, viewed from Gokyo Ri

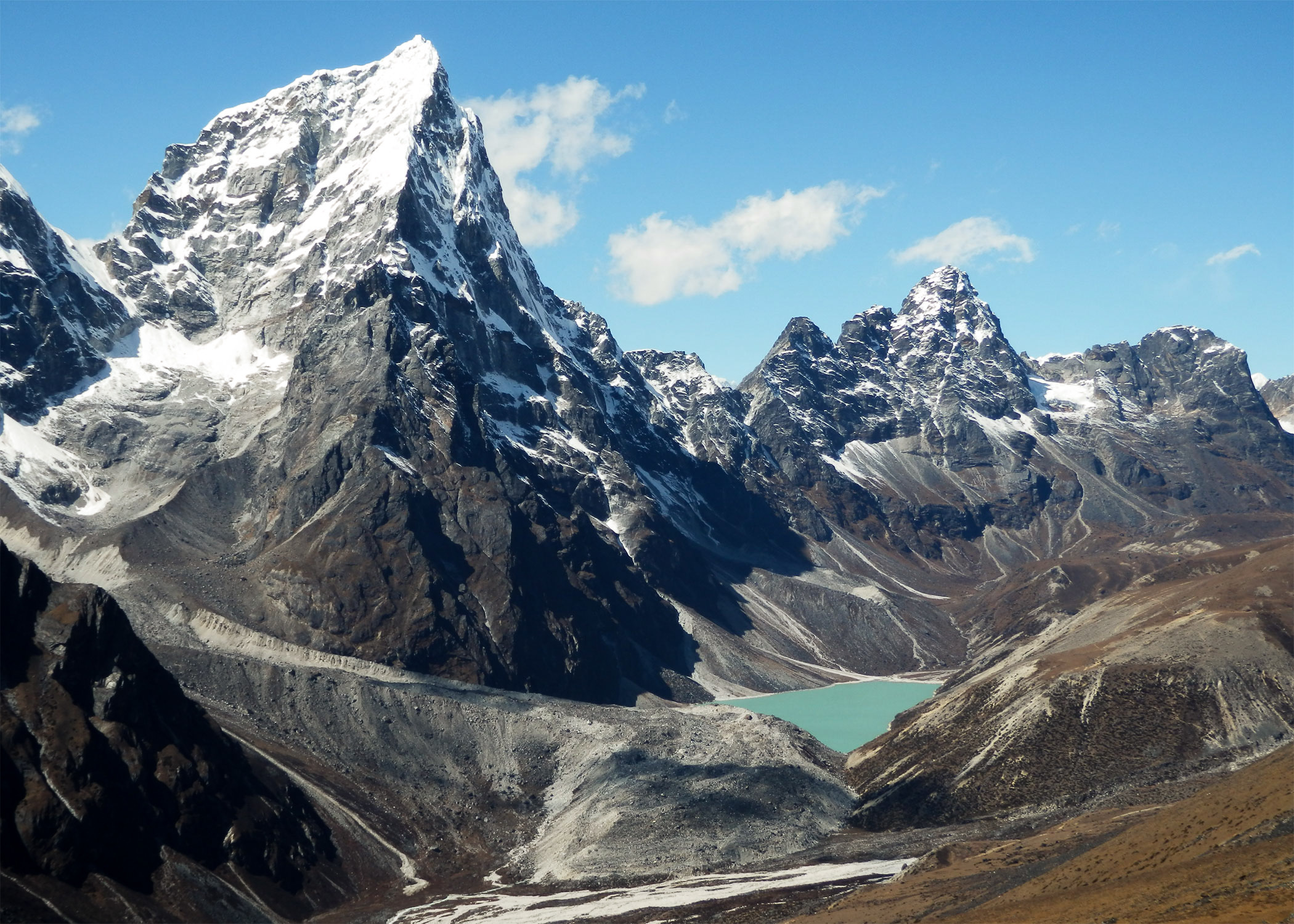
Cholatse (left) and Arakam Tse (right)

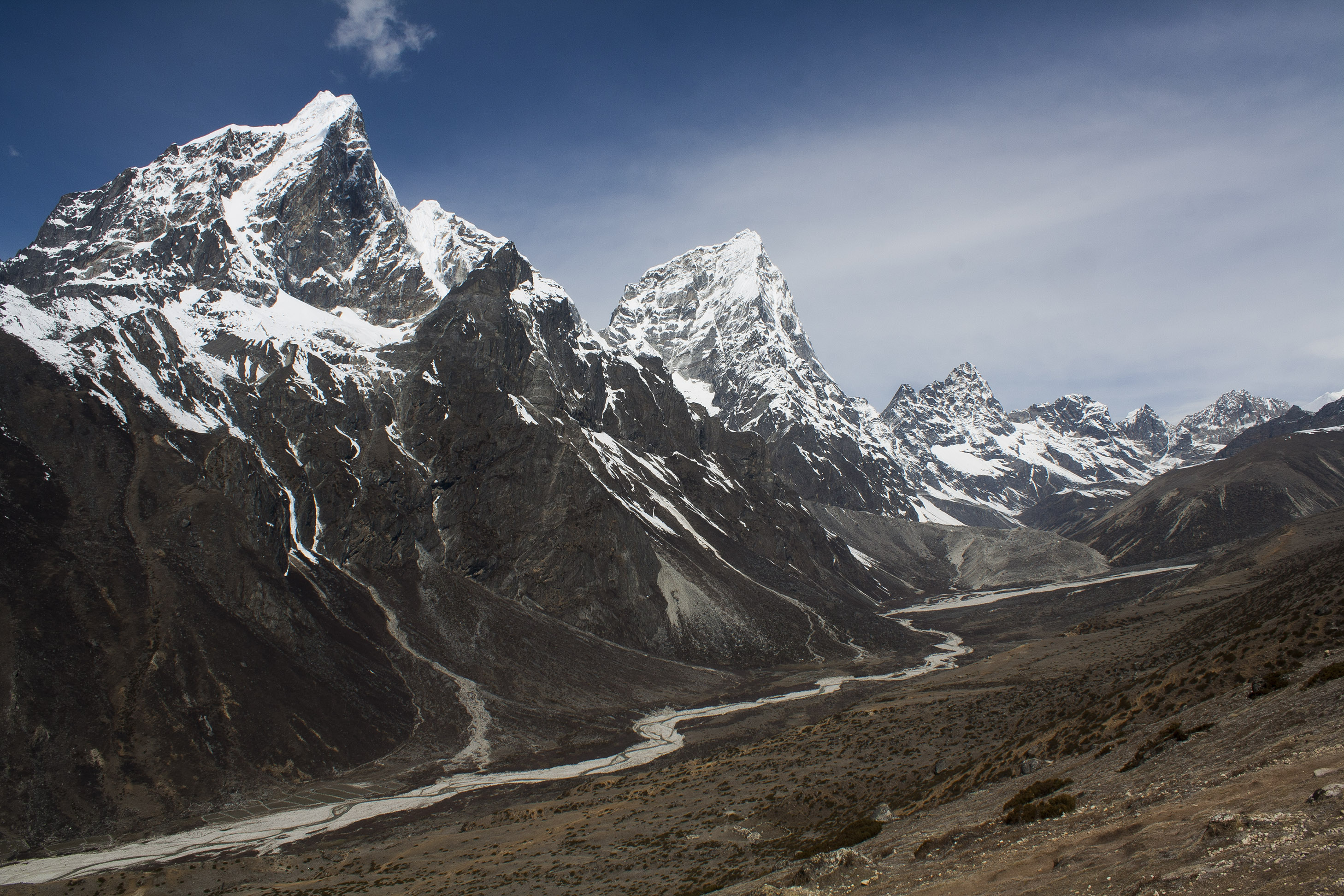
Taboche, Cholatse and Arakam Tse

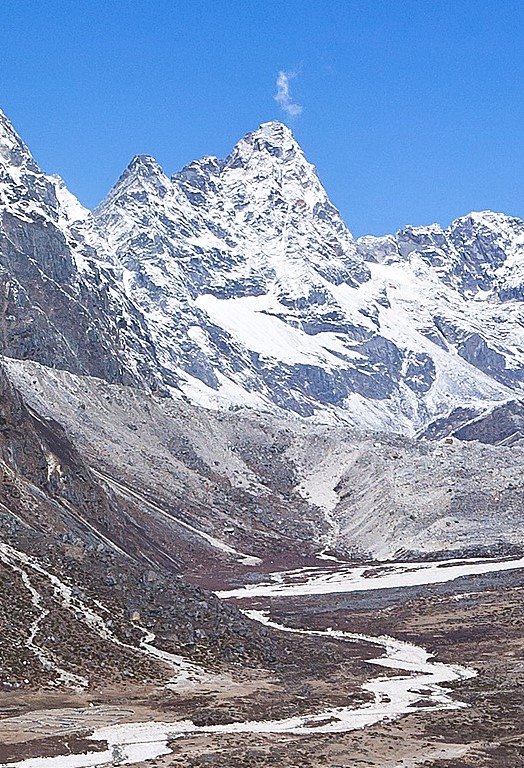
Southeast aspect

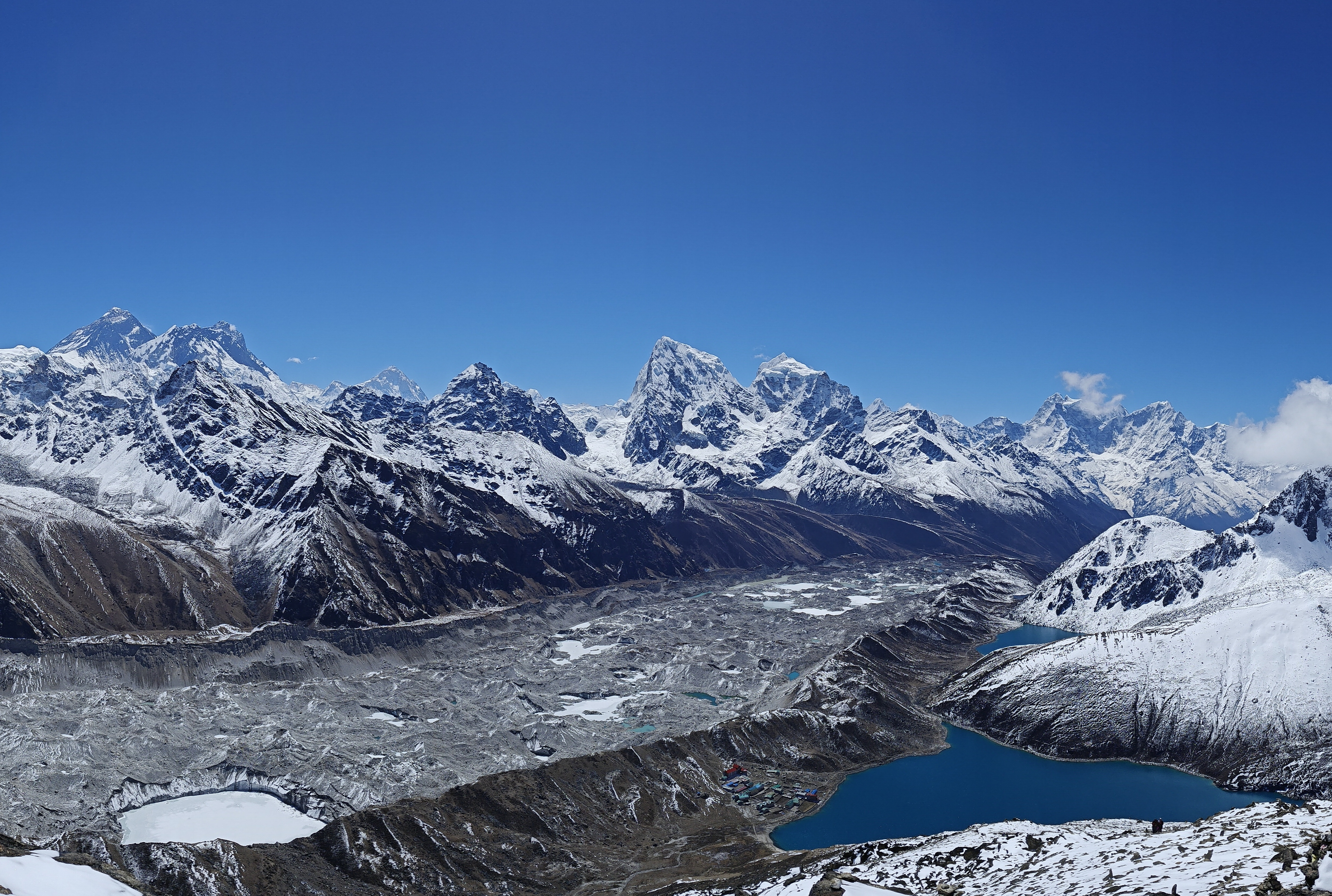
Arakam Tse to left of center, Mount Everest furthest left, Ngozumpa Glacier below

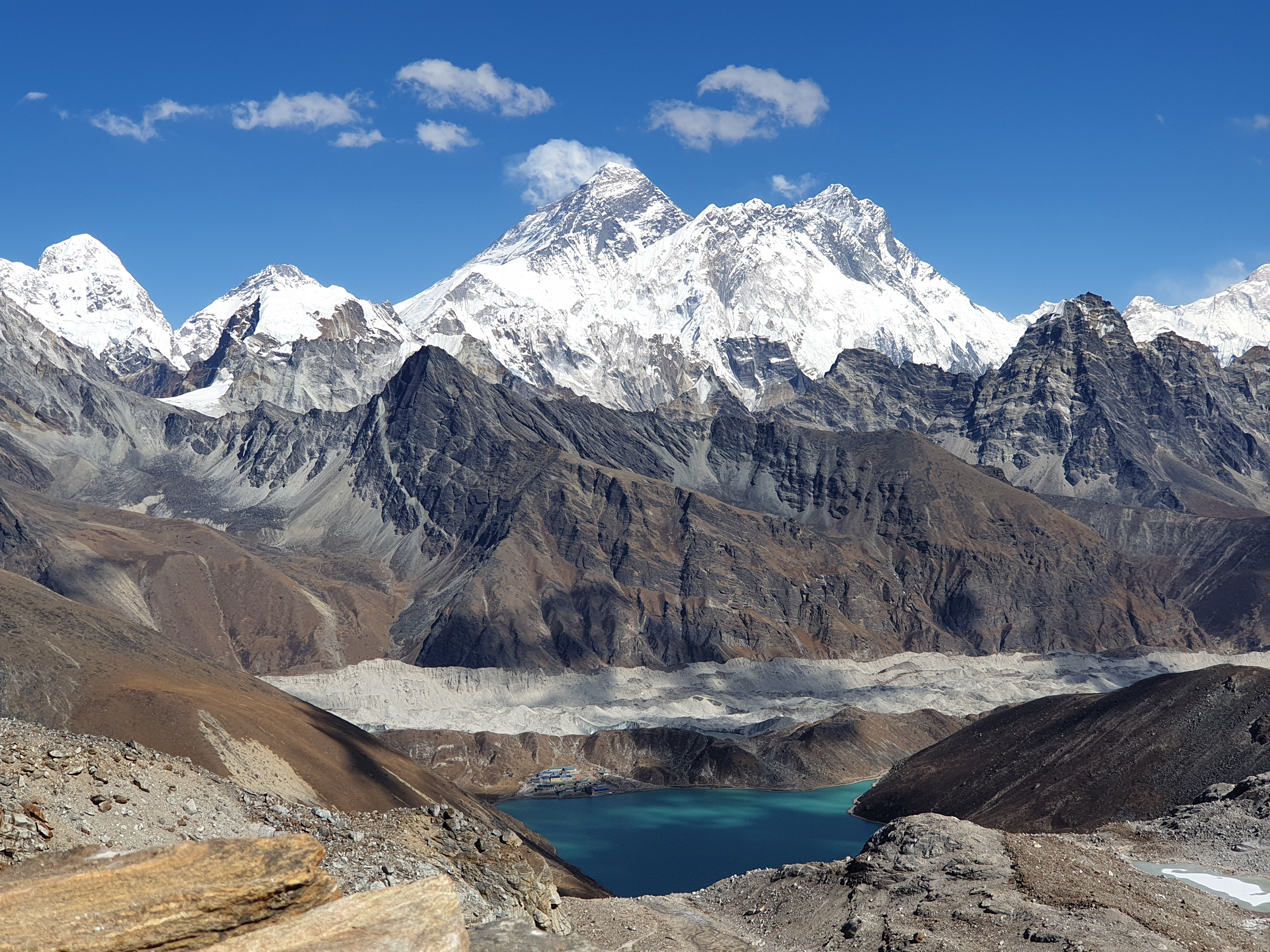
Arakam Tse is the dark peak to right, Mount Everest centered

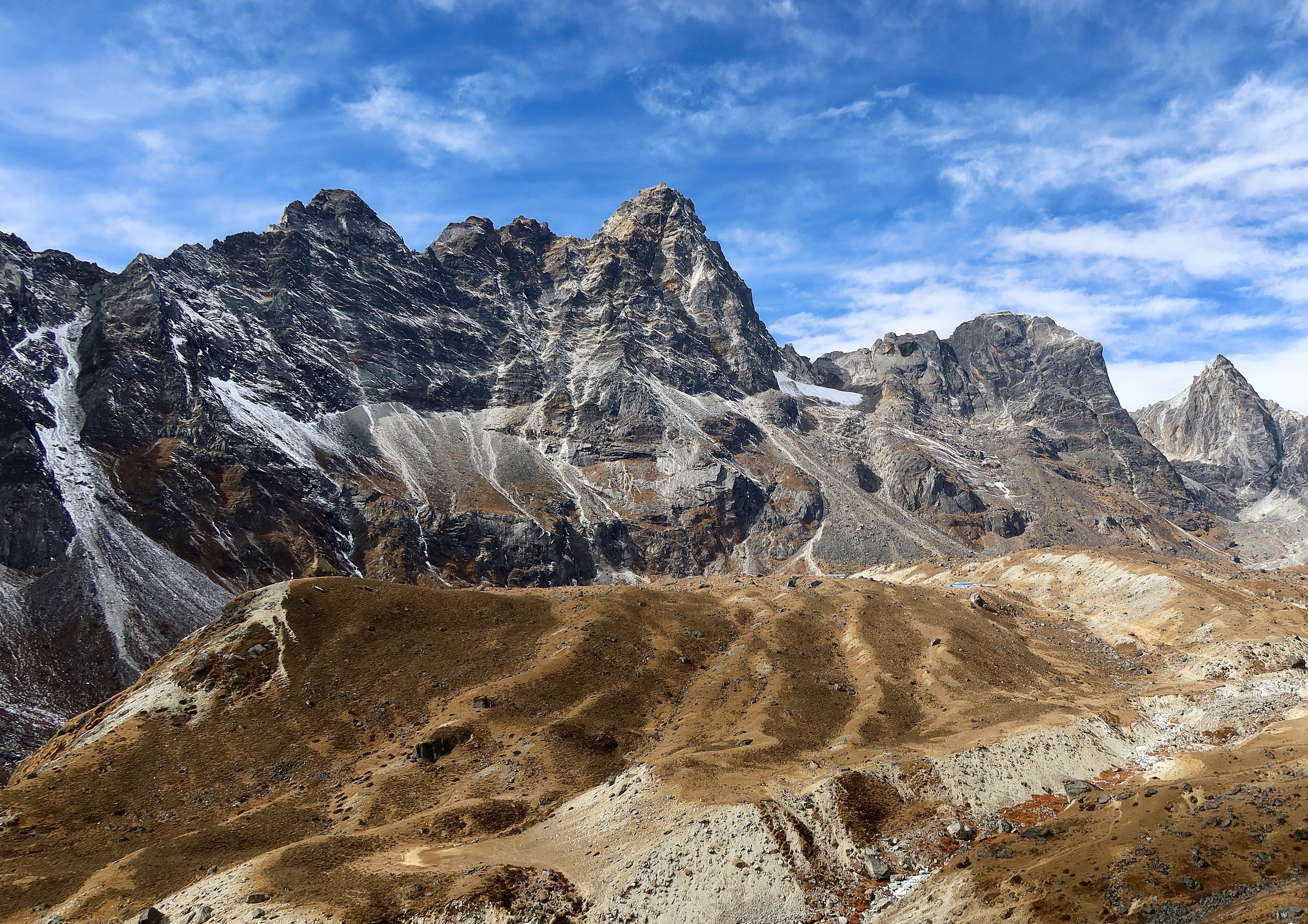
East aspect

== See also ==
- Geology of the Himalayas
