= Jean-Christian Michel =

French composer and clarinetist (born 1938)

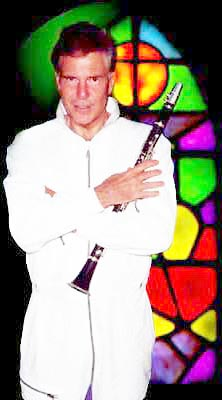
Jean-Christian-Michel

Jean-Christian Michel (born 1938) is a composer and clarinetist. His compositions are influenced by jazz and by baroque music, particularly that of Johann Sebastian Bach. Before starting his musical career, Jean-Christian Michel was a doctor, as a surgeon.

His first record Requiem was released in 1966. He founded the ensemble Quatuor avec Orgue. Michel has received 3 diamond discs, 7 platinum discs and 10 golden discs. With more than five million discs sold, (3 discs classified 1, 2 & 3 in the charts of CIDD-France soir in the seventies); and thousands of concerts to his credit, he today pursues a global career. Michel is a "Full Member" of the SACEM (an association of composers and music publishers to protect copyright and royalties). He received the prize for "Sciences and Culture" at Sorbonne, Paris, France, which was awarded by a jury of six Nobel Prize winners. Jean-Christian Michel is currently the godfather of the campaign Neurodon, within the Federation for Brain Research FRC Drummer Kenny Clarke played and recorded with Michel for 10 years. Michel is also a very experienced mountain climber. He was a member of the group that made the first-ever ascent of Tawesche, in the Himalayas, in 1974.

== Discography ==
- Requiem
- Aranjuez
- Musique sacrée (with Kenny Clarke)
- Crucifixus
- JQM (with Kenny Clarke)
- Le cœur des etoiles
- Vision d’Ezéchiel
- Ouverture spatiale (with Kenny Clarke)
- Eve des origines (with Kenny Clarke)
- Port-Maria (with Kenny Clarke)
- Musique de lumière
- Jean-Christian Michel in concert
- Vif-obscur
- Les années-lumière
- Les cathédrales de lumière
- Aranjuez 2004
- Portail de l'espace 2005
- Bach transcriptions 2006
- Live concert 2007
- Spatial Requiem 2008
- Jean-Christian Michel plays jazz 2012

== DVD ==
- "Imaginaire" (2010)
