= Taboche =

Mountain in Nepal

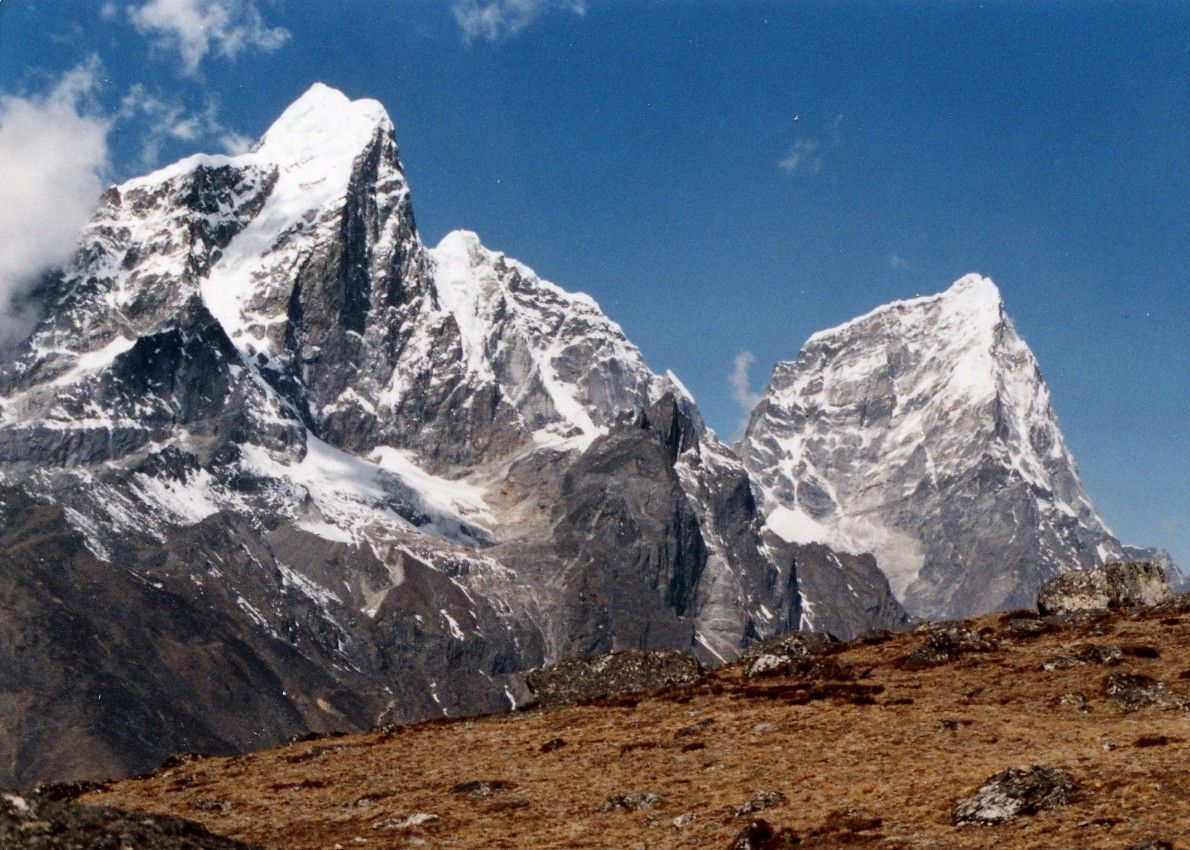
- Taboche (left) and Cholatse (right)

Highest point
- Elevation: 6,495 m (21,309 ft)
- Prominence: 1,151 m (3,776 ft)
- Coordinates: 27°53′51″N 86°46′45″E

Geography
- Location within Nepal
- Location: Khumbu, Nepal
- Parent range: Khumbu Himal

Climbing
- First ascent: 1974
- Easiest route: rock/snow/ice climb

Taboche (also known as Tawoche, Tobuche, Tāuje, Taweche, Tawache or Tawetse) is a mountain in the Khumbu region of the Nepalese Himalaya. Taboche is connected to Cholatse by a long ridge. Taboche lies directly across the Imja River from Ama Dablam and above the villages of Pheriche and Dingboche.

The first ascent was made in 1974 by a French expedition led by Yannick Seigneur and the clarinettist and composer Jean-Christian Michel. The summit team included Louis Dubost, Paul Gendre and Jacques Brugirard.

== Other notable ascents ==
- 1989 The direct north-east face of Taboche (Tawoche) was climbed in winter by Jeff Lowe and John Roskelley alpine-style during a ten-day push in February 1989. They reached the summit on February 13. The route follows the deep vertical cleft up the center of the face. The climb is documented in Last Days, a book by John Roskelley (1991).
- 2009 Direct North Face (VI AI5 R, 1500m). First ascent by Giri-Giri Boys Fumitaka Ichimura and Genki Narumi (Japan). Summit attained November 28.

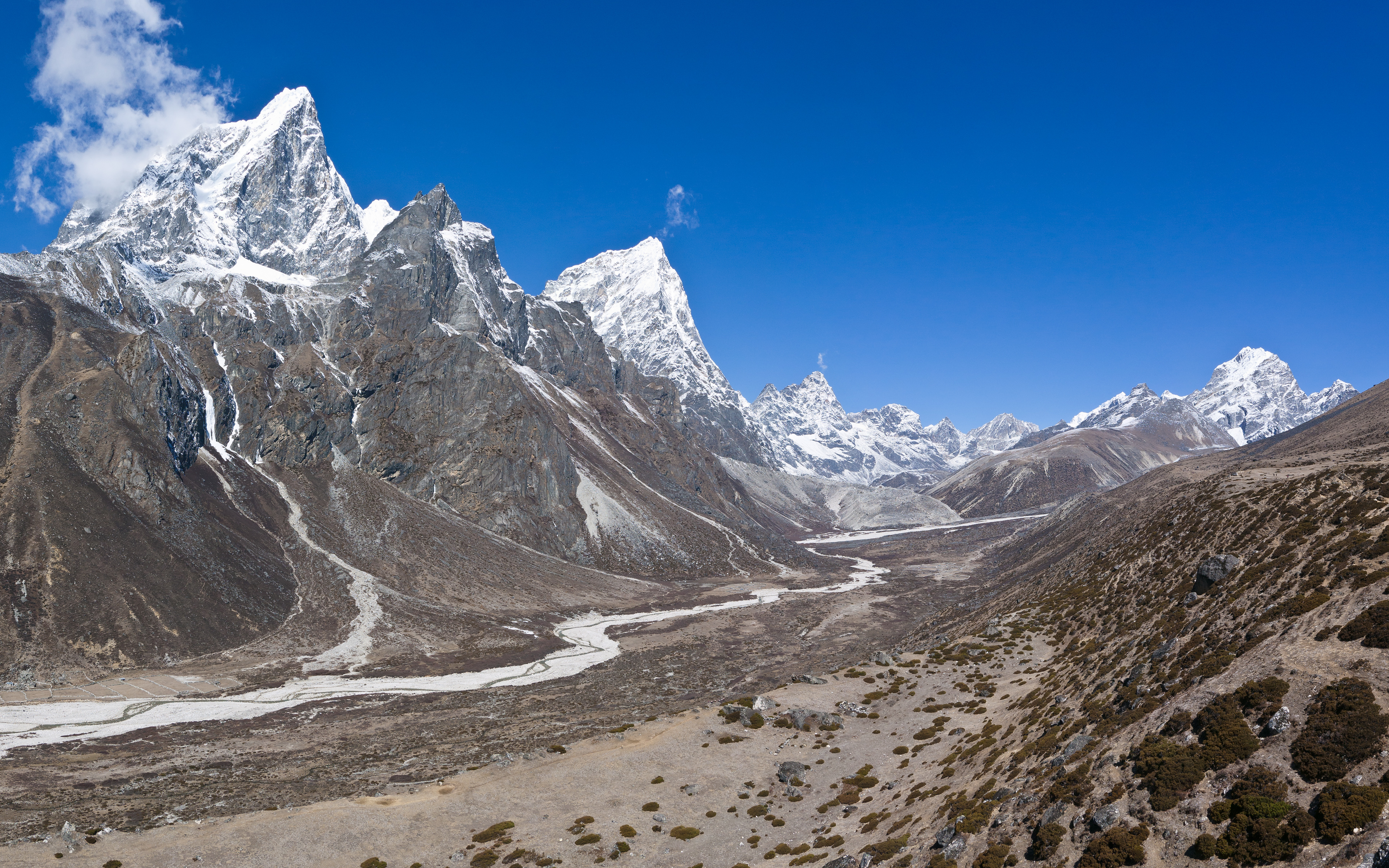
Taboche at left, Cholatse, and Arakam Tse

== Books ==
- John Roskelley "Last Days", (Stackpole Books, 1991), [0-8117-0889-6].
