= Sylvia Clevenger =

American prostitute

- Born: Sylvia Mae Hughes; April 16, 1891; Fairfield (now Oakford), Howard County, Indiana, US
- Died: January 7, 1951 (aged 59); Michigan City, Indiana, US
- Occupation: Prostitute
- Known for: Minor associate of the John Dillinger gang
- Spouse(s): 1. Charles O. Alexander (1910-?); 2. John Clevenger (1915-1930); 3. Chester Williams (1930-?)
- Parent(s): Charley and Mary Hughes

Sylvia Clevenger (born as Sylvia Mae Hughes; April 16, 1891 – January 7, 1951) was an American prostitute who worked with madam Pearl Elliott and was a minor associate of the John Dillinger gang. Her brother William was the former husband of Elliott. She was married three times, reverting to her maiden name of Hughes after her divorce from her second husband, John Clevenger, in 1930. She lived for much of her life in Kokomo, Indiana, and died in 1951 in Michigan City, Indiana.

== Early life ==
Sylvia Mae Hughes was born on April 16, 1891, at Fairfield (now Oakford) in Howard County, Indiana. She was the daughter of Charley and Mary Hughes. According to the 1900 census, the family was living in Taylor Township, where her father's occupation was listed as a horse jockey.

== Marriage ==
Hughes married Charles O. Alexander in Howard County on April 26, 1910. In the census of that year, the couple were recorded as living with her father in Taylor Township, Howard County, and two years later, they appear in the city directory of Kokomo. They were living at 323 1/2 North Buckeye, where Charles' occupation was listed as a waiter.

The marriage was short-lived, as she was married for the second time on February 23, 1915, to John Clevenger in Howard County. Her location and the occupation of her husband can be traced from subsequent city directories for Kokomo and from census returns. In 1918, they were living at 1525 North McCann, and he was a teamster. Two years later, they were living at 715 West Street in Kokomo, and had a son. John was by then a dealer in livestock. He was listed as a horse dealer in 1923, when they were living at 2437 North Main, and three years later were still living at the same location, but his occupation was a stock dealer. John's occupation had changed again by 1928, as he was listed as a driver in the city directory.

By the time of the 1930 census, the couple were living at 2437 North Buckeye Street in Kokomo, where John's occupation was listed as a laborer, but the city directory for the same year listed Hughes as living on her own at 212 South Locke. On November 2, 1930, she was married for the third time, to Chester Williams in New Albany, Indiana. They were operating a used car business in 1934, and were based at 2437 North Main, where Hughes had lived in the 1920s with John Clevenger.

== Local notoriety ==
Hughes' husband, Clevenger, was well known to Kokomo police and had been convicted on liquor violations. On August 16, 1929, he brought a suit for divorce, charging that Sylvia refused to fix his meals, was constantly away from home and was 'in evil associations'. Three days later, a hearing on the case of assault and battery against John Clevenger filed by Hughes was postponed due to lack of witnesses from the city. A continuance in the case was granted on August 24, but the charges were eventually dismissed on December 5.

On May 26, 1930, Clevenger found that Hughes was living in Terre Haute with Chester Williams. Clevenger and Frank Wallace, a parolee from Michigan City, beat Williams so severely that he was hospitalized for two weeks. Both men were charged with assault and battery with intent to kill.

On September 16, 1930, Hughes hosted Pearl Elliott, Mrs. John Kiefer and Miss Bernice Rose, all of Kokomo, in Terre Haute. She was granted a divorce from Clevenger in September 1930 in Vigo County on grounds of cruel and inhumane treatment, and returned to using her maiden name of Hughes.

== Association with Dillinger ==
In September 1933, bank robber John Dillinger gave $27,000 in cash to Pearl Elliott to buy and equip a hideout for his gang in Terre Haute, Indiana. Elliott enlisted the help of Clevenger, and the residence at 2351 Fernwood Avenue was purchased.

Confessions of Ed Shouse, an associate of Dillinger, placed members of the gang in Terre Haute before the robberies of the Peru police station and the Central National Bank in Greencastle. When two suitcase-toting hitchhikers paid a Hendricks county farmer $25 to drop them off in Terre Haute at the corner of 25th and Fernwood, the police were contacted. On the morning of November 8, 1933, members of the Terre Haute Police, Indiana National Guard, and Indiana State Police raided the residence but did not find any of the gang there.

== Post Dillinger ==
On March 5, 1935, Clevenger and Hughes filed suit in Howard County Circuit Court for possession of two lots and buildings against the estate of George Clevenger.

== Death ==
Hughes died on January 7, 1951, in Michigan City, Indiana, at the age of 59. She was buried in Crown Point Cemetery in Kokomo, Indiana.

== Bibliography ==
- McCormick, Mike (2005). Terre Haute: Queen City of the Wabash. Arcadia Publishing. ISBN 978-0738524061.
- Polk (1912). Polk's Kokomo Indiana City Directory. Indianapolis, Indiana: R.L. Polk & Co.
- Polk (1918). Polk's Kokomo Indiana City Directory. Indianapolis, Indiana: R.L. Polk & Co.
- Polk (1923). Polk's Kokomo Indiana City Directory. Indianapolis, Indiana: R.L. Polk & Co.
- Polk (1926). Polk's Kokomo Indiana City Directory. Indianapolis, Indiana: R.L. Polk & Co.
- Polk (1928). Polk's Kokomo Indiana City Directory. Indianapolis, Indiana: R.L. Polk & Co.
- Polk (1930). Polk's Kokomo Indiana City Directory. Indianapolis, Indiana: R.L. Polk & Co.
- Polk (1934). Polk's Kokomo Indiana City Directory. Indianapolis, Indiana: R.L. Polk & Co.
