= Vern Clevenger =

American mountain climber and photographer (born 1955)

Vern Clevenger (born 1955 in Oakland, California) is a noted climber and landscape photographer. He made the first ascent of Cholatse in 1982. He lives in Mammoth Lakes, California with his wife and two children, Dylan and Sabrina. On April 13, 1977, Clevenger was arrested looting the crashed wreckage of a drug-smuggling airplane in Yosemite National Park. These efforts paid off with his first Nikon camera system. Clevenger shows his work at the Clevenger Gallery and Studio, in Mammoth Lakes, California, assisted by his wife Margaret, son Dylan, and daughter Sabrina.
