= Shobal Vail Clevenger Jr. =

American physician (1843–1920)

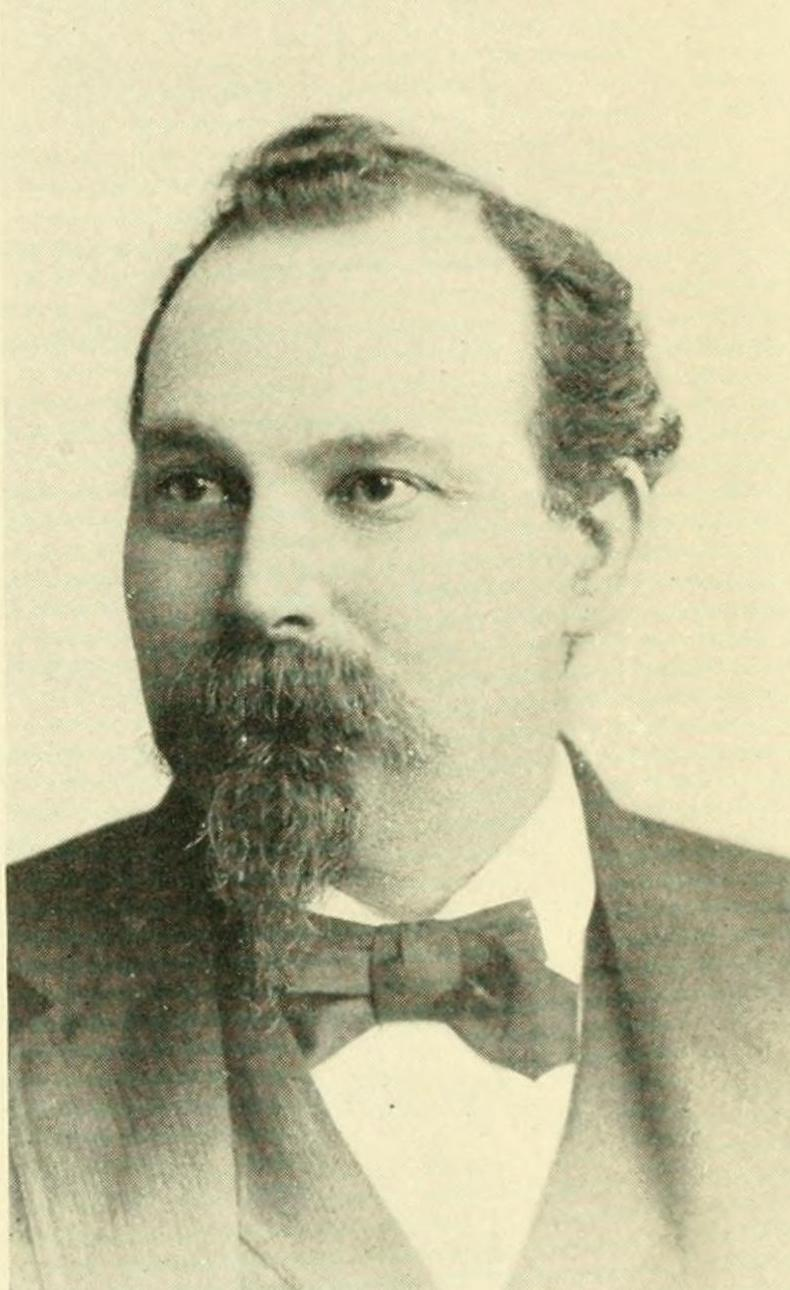
- Born: 24 March 1843; Florence, Italy
- Died: 24 March 1920 (aged 77)
- Education: Chicago Medical College
- Medical career
- Field: psychiatry
- Institutions: Chicago County Insane Asylum; Michael Reese Hospital; Alexian Brothers' Hospital
- Notable works: Comparative Physiology and Psychology

Shobal Vail Clevenger Jr. (24 March 1843 – 24 March 1920) was an American physician who specialized in nervous and mental diseases.

== Biography ==
Shobal Vail Clevenger Jr. was born in Florence, Italy, on 24 March 1843, the son of sculptor Shobal Vail Clevenger, who died the year he was born. He received his early education at the College of the Immaculate Conception (now Jesuit High School) in New Orleans, and later graduated from the Chicago Medical College. In 1860, he filled a clerkship in a St. Louis bank, which he resigned to visit New Mexico, crossing the plains for this purpose. Returning soon after the beginning of the American Civil War, he enlisted in the U.S. Army, and served in the engineer corps, attaining the rank of first lieutenant. Subsequently, he was engaged in surveying in Montana and Dakota, and filled the office of U.S. deputy surveyor. Later, he built the first telegraph line through Dakota, and for a time was chief engineer of the Dakota Southern Railroad.

In 1873, he began the study of medicine under army surgeons in Fort Sully, while holding the appointment of civilian meteorologist in the U.S. Signal Service. He settled in Chicago in 1879, and after studying medicine, became a specialist in nervous and mental diseases. For some years, he was a pathologist at the Chicago County Insane Asylum, and he was a consulting physician in his specialties at Michael Reese Hospital and the Alexian Brothers' Hospital. He also held the professorship of anatomy in the Art Institute of Chicago.

Clevenger was a member of many scientific organizations, such as the American Neurological Association, the American Microscopical Society, the American Anthropometric Society, the American Electrical Society, and the Society of American Anatomists.

He died on 24 March 1920 and was buried in Graceland Cemetery in Chicago.

A collection of his papers are held at the National Library of Medicine.

== Works ==
Clevenger was a frequent contributor to the scientific press. He also published:

- Treatise on Government Surveying (New York, 1874)
- Comparative Physiology and Psychology (Chicago, 1885)
- Lectures on Artistic Anatomy and the Sciences Useful to the Artist (New York, 1887)
