= Shobal Vail Clevenger =

American sculptor (1812–1843)

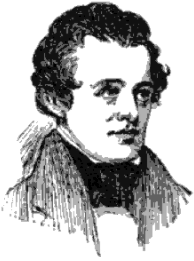
- Born: 22 October 1812; Middletown
- Died: 23 September 1843 (aged 30)
- Occupation: Sculptor

Shobal Vail Clevenger (22 October 1812 near Middletown, Ohio – 23 September 1843 at sea) was an American sculptor.

== Biography ==
He was the son of a New Jersey weaver, went to Cincinnati when a boy, and found occupation as a stone cutter. Having developed artistic ability, as was shown by some very creditable tombstone work, he was induced by David Guid to carve busts in freestone. His first effort in this direction was the likeness of E. S. Thomas, then editor of the Cincinnati Evening Post, which was executed directly in the stone, without the intervention of plaster.

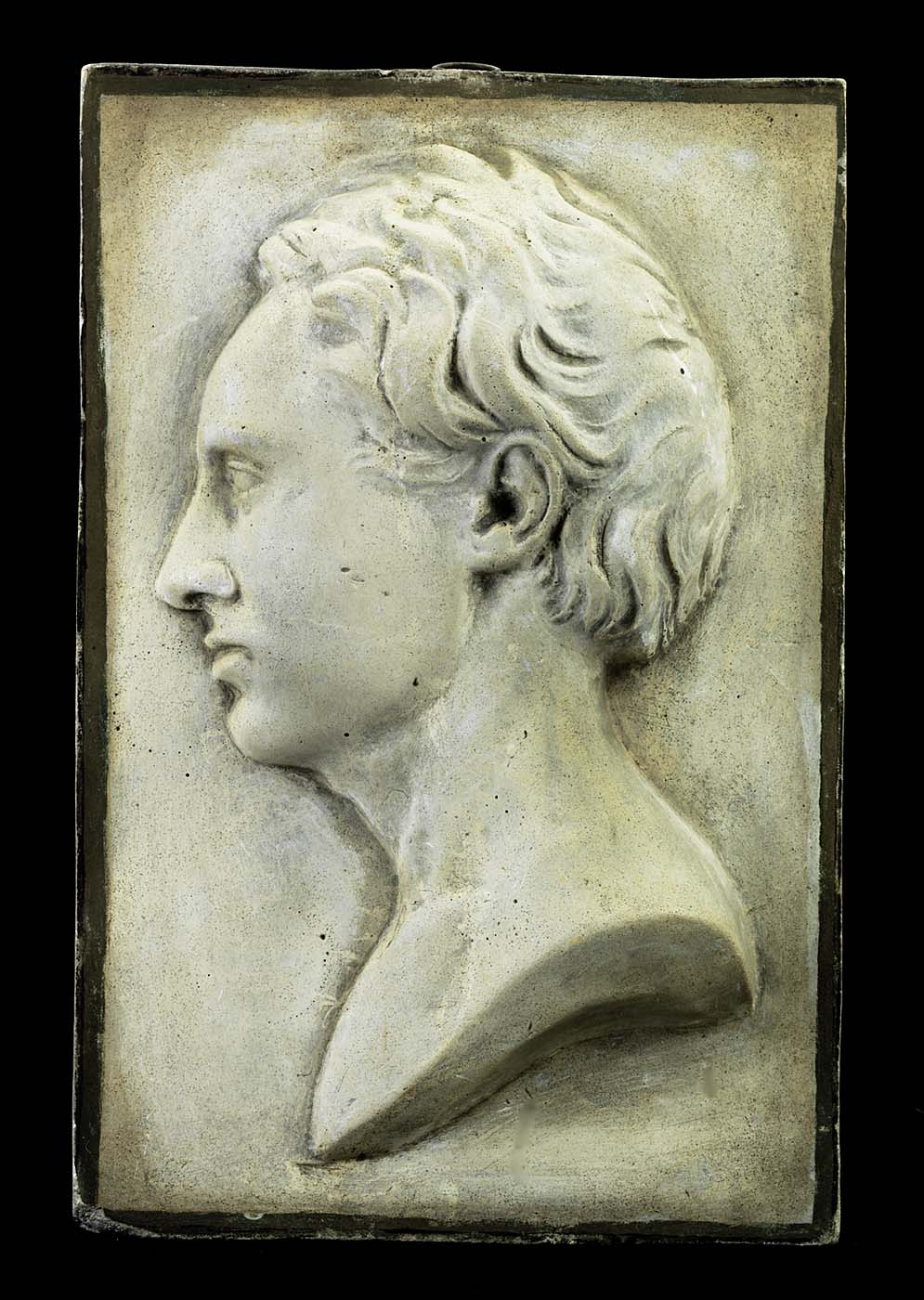
Profile relief of painter Miner Kilbourne Kellogg by Clevenger, 1839, in the Smithsonian American Art Museum

He subsequently devoted himself to art, and transferred his studio to New York City. Among his sitters were William Henry Harrison, Henry Clay, Martin Van Buren, Daniel Webster, Edward Everett, and Washington Allston. Specimens of his work are now preserved in the art galleries of the Boston Athenaeum, the New York and Philadelphia historical societies, the Smithsonian American Art Museum, the Metropolitan Museum of Art in New York, and the Academy of Fine Arts in Philadelphia. His bust of Daniel Webster was selected by the United States Post Office as best adapted for representation on the fifteen cent U.S. postage stamp.

In 1840, he went to reside in Rome, where he executed the "North American Indian," which was the first distinctive American piece of sculpture made in Rome, and attracted a large number of Italians to his studio. While in Italy, he contracted pulmonary phthsis by inhalation of stone dust. He died when one day's sail from Gibraltar, and his body was consigned to the ocean.

== Family ==
His son, Shobal Vail Clevenger, Jr., was a noted physician.
