= Praz =

Praz may refer to:

== Places ==
- La Praz, Vaud, Switzerland
- Le Praz, Courchevel, Savoie, France,
- Präz, Graubünden, Switzerland
- Les Praz, Chamonix, France

== Names ==
- Mario Praz (1896–1982), Italian-born critic of art and literature, and a scholar of English literature
- A common misspelling of Pras, American rapper (born 1972)

== Artists and media ==
- Praz siabie – BN's album
