= Aiguille du Dru =

Mountain in the Mont Blanc massif in the French Alps

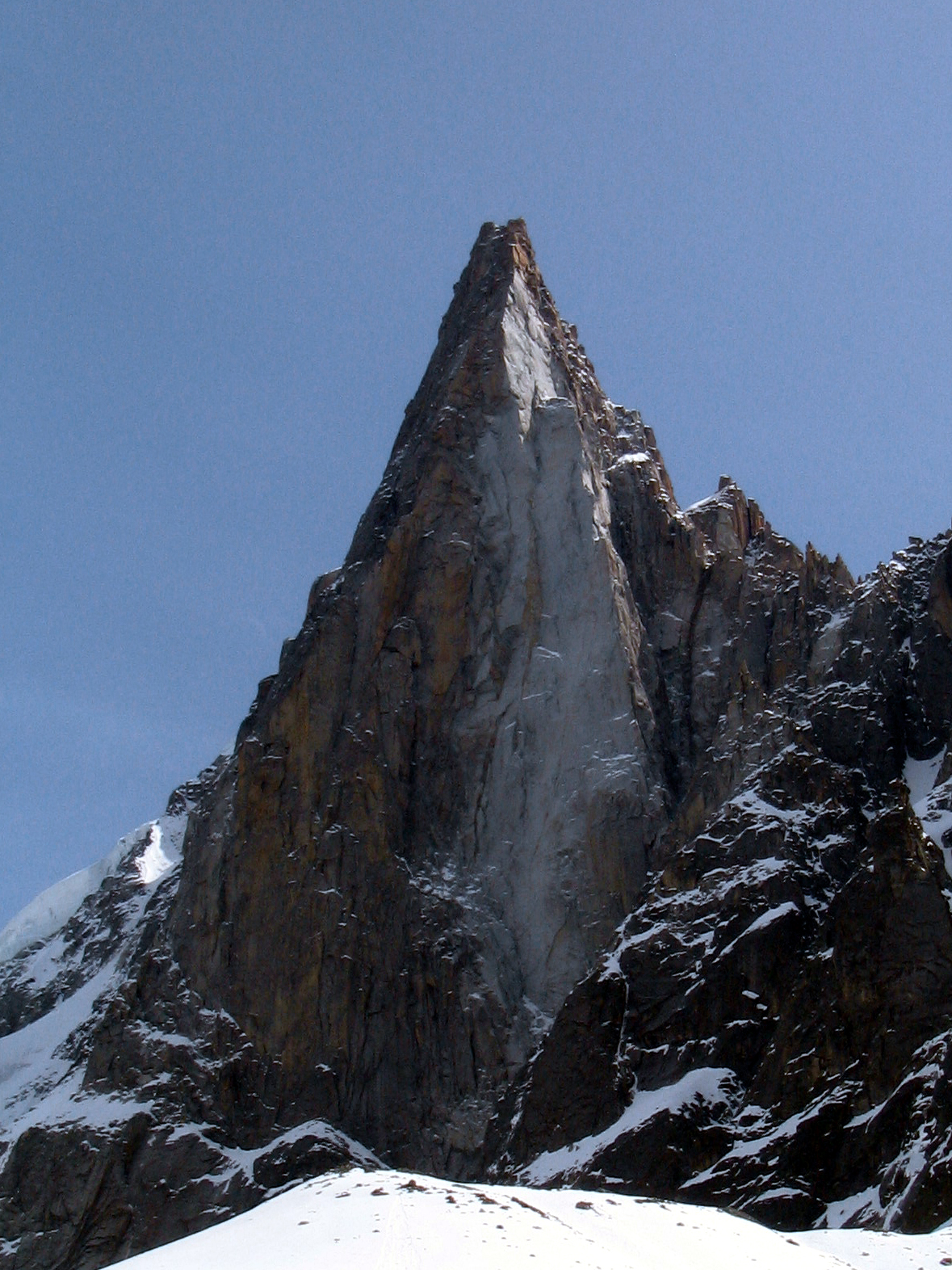
- The west and south-west faces of the Petit Dru, with visible grey rockfall scar (May, 2006)

Highest point
- Elevation: 3,754 m (12,316 ft)
- Listing: Great north faces of the Alps
- Coordinates: 45°55′58″N 6°57′23″E

Geography
- Location within France
- Location: Haute-Savoie, France
- Parent range: Graian Alps

Geology
- Mountain type: Granite

Climbing
- First ascent: 12 September 1878 by Clinton Thomas Dent, James Walker Hartley, Alexander Burgener and K. Maurer
- Easiest route: AD

The Aiguille du Dru (also the Dru or the Drus; French, Les Drus) is a mountain in the Mont Blanc massif in the French Alps. It is situated to the east of the village of Les Praz in the Chamonix valley. "Aiguille" means "needle" in French.

The mountain's highest summit is:

- Grande Aiguille du Dru (or the Grand Dru) 3,754 m

Another, slightly lower sub-summit is:

- Petite Aiguille du Dru (or the Petit Dru) 3,733 m.

The two summits are on the west ridge of the Aiguille Verte (4,122 m) and are connected to each other by the Brèche du Dru (3,697 m). The north face of the Petit Dru is considered one of the six great north faces of the Alps.

The southwest "Bonatti Pillar" and its eponymous climbing route were destroyed in a 2005 rock fall.

== Ascents ==
The first ascent of the Grand Dru was by British alpinists Clinton Thomas Dent and James Walker Hartley, with guides Alexander Burgener and K. Maurer, who climbed it via the south-east face on 12 September 1878. Dent, in his description of the climb, wrote:

Those who follow us, and I think there will be many, will perhaps be glad of a few hints about this peak. Taken together, it affords the most continuously interesting rock climb with which I am acquainted. There is no wearisome tramp over moraine, no great extent of snow fields to traverse. Sleeping out as we did, it would be possible to ascend and return to Chamonix in about 16 to 18 hrs. But the mountain is never safe when snow is on the rocks, and at such times stones fall freely down the couloir leading up from the head of the glacier. The best time for the expedition would be, in ordinary seasons, in the month of August. The rocks are sound and are peculiarly unlike those of other mountains. From the moment the glacier is left, hard climbing begins, and the hands as well as the feet are continuously employed. The difficulties are therefore enormously increased if the rocks be glazed or cold; and in bad weather the crags of the Dru would be as pretty a place for an accident as can well be imagined.

The Petit Dru was climbed in the following year, on 29 August 1879, by J. E. Charlet-Straton, P. Payot and F. Follignet via the south face and the south-west ridge. The first traverse of both summits of the Drus was by E. Fontaine and J. Ravanel on 23 August 1901. The first winter traverse of the Drus was by Armand Charlet and Camille Devouassoux on 25 February 1938.

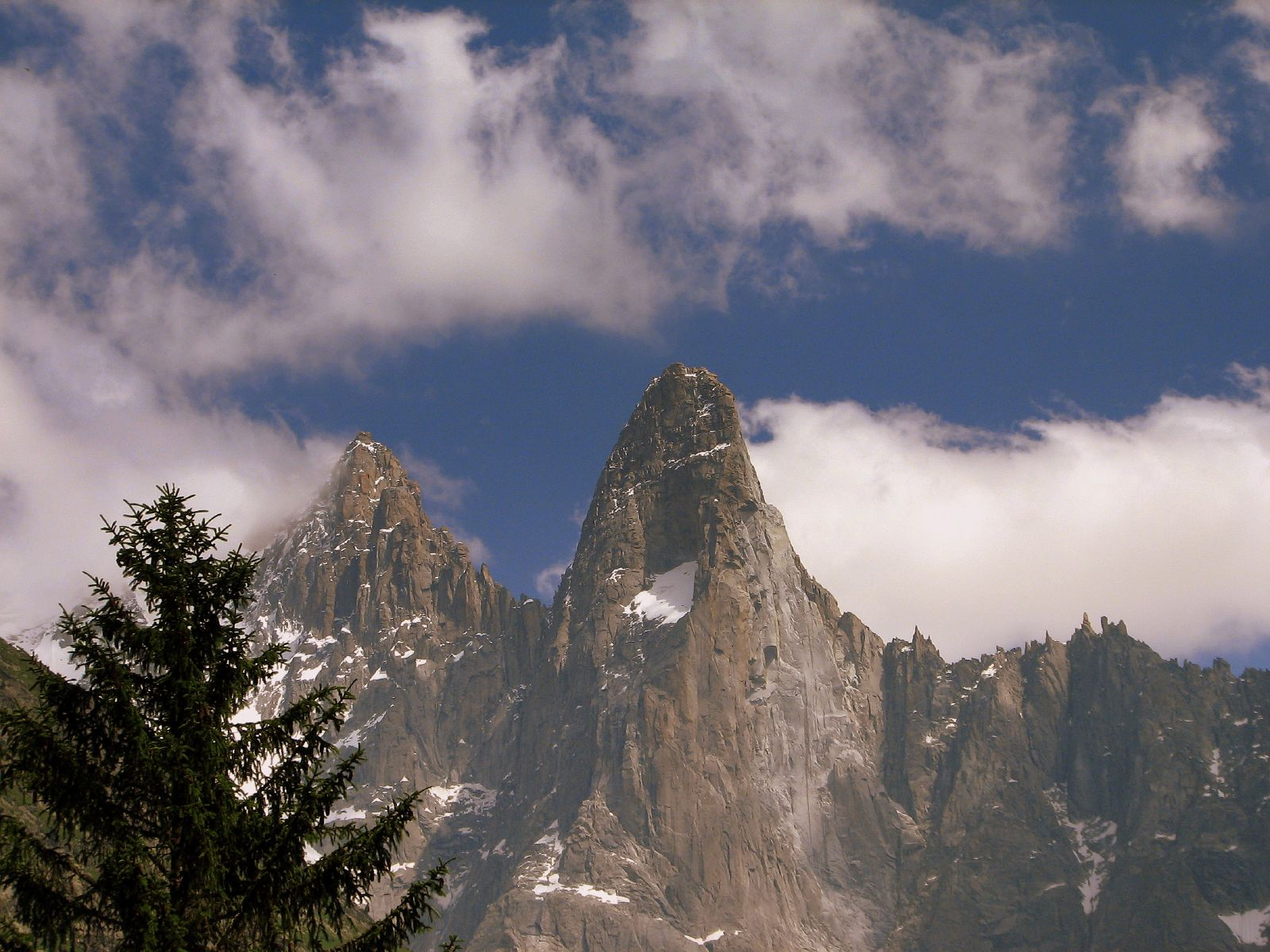
The north face of the Petit Dru (centre, with large snowpatch) in 2008. The west and south-west faces (with fresh rockfall scars) are to the right. The peak on the left is the Aiguille Verte.

In 1889 both peaks of the Dru were climbed for the first time from the Petit Dru to the Grand Dru by two parties. One party contained Katharine Richardson and guides Emile Rey and Jean-Baptiste Bich, and the other Mr Nash and Mr Williams with guides François Simond, Frederic Payot and Edouard Cupelin.

== The west and south-west faces ==
These 1000 m-high rock faces have seen serious rockfalls in 1950, 1997, 2003, 2005 and 2011, which have considerably affected the structure of the mountain and destroyed a number of routes.

Although at the time of the first ascent of the north face (Pierre Allain and R. Leininger on 1 August 1935), Pierre Allain considered the west face to be unclimbable, the team of A. Dagory, Guido Magnone, Lucien Bérardini and Marcel Lainé succeeded on the face in a series of attempts on 5 July and 17–19 July 1952 using considerable artificial aid. Over the period 17–22 August 1955, the Italian climber Walter Bonatti climbed a difficult solo route on the south-west pillar of the Petit Dru (the Bonatti Pillar); this route – like many on the west face – no longer exists in its original state owing to rockfall, the scars of which remain clearly visible from the Chamonix valley. Seven years later, from 24 to 26 July 1962, Gary Hemming and Royal Robbins climbed the 'American Direct', a more direct route up the west face than that taken in 1952. On 10–13 August 1965, Royal Robbins, this time accompanied by John Harlin, climbed the 'American Direttissima'. This route was destroyed by the 2005 rockfall.

== 1966 rescue ==
In 1966 two German climbers became stuck on a climb of the west face. Attempts to rescue them were made by three teams, including climbers such as Gary Hemming who were in the area and had climbed the face themselves. The rescue extended over seven days and received international press and TV coverage. The two climbers were rescued but a companion involved in the rescue died in the attempt.

== Summit statue ==
On 4 September 1913 a party of climbers led by Camille Simond and Roberts Charlet-Straton attempted to carry a hollow metal statue of Our Lady of Lourdes up the peak. The statue, almost a metre high, weighing 13 kilos and made of aluminium, had to be left in a rocky crevice at 3,000 m because of poor weather, and it was only on 18 September 1919 that the statue was finally hoisted to the summit by a party from Argentière: Alfred, Arthur, Camille, Joseph, and Jules-Félicien Ravanel together with the village priest, abbé Alexis Couttin.

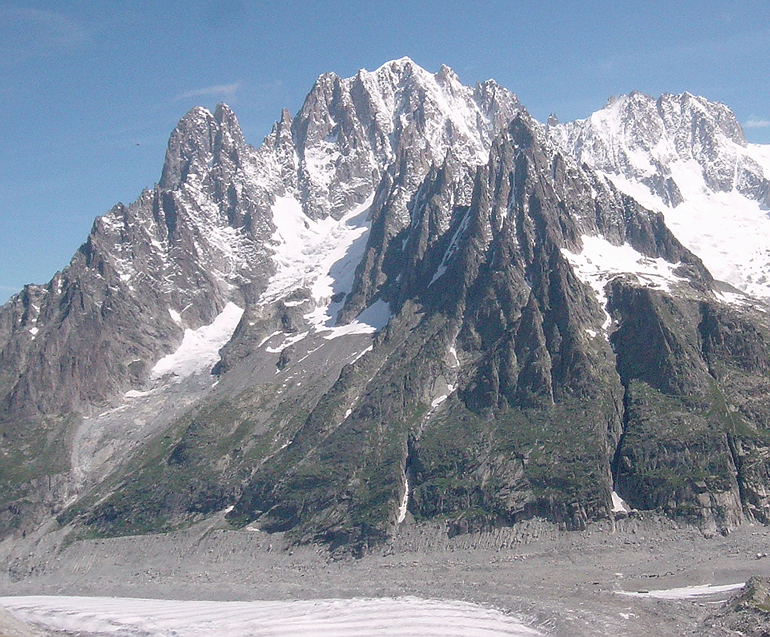
The Aiguille du Dru (left) seen as an extension of the west ridge of the Aiguille Verte (centre top)
