= The Alps (film) =

- Directed by: Stephen Judson
- Written by: Stephen Venables; Stephen Judson
- Produced by: Stephen Judson; Mark Krenzien; Greg MacGillivray
- Starring: John Harlin; Robert Jasper; Daniela Jasper
- Cinematography: Michael Brown
- Edited by: Stephen Judson
- Music by: Queen
- Distributed by: IMAX Corporation
- Release date: March 9, 2007
- Running time: 51 minutes
- Country: United States
- Language: English

The Alps is a 2007 American documentary film about the climbing of the north face of the Eiger in the Bernese Alps by John Harlin III, son of John Harlin who died on the same ascent 40 years earlier. It was shot in 70mm IMAX.

== Cast ==
- Michael Gambon, Narrator
- John Harlin III as himself
- Robert Jasper as himself
- Daniela Jasper as herself
- Adele Hammond as herself
- Siena Harlin as herself
- Bruno Messerli as himself
- Beatrice Messerli as herself
- Christine Pielmeier as herself

== See also ==
- Swiss Alps
- Everest, Imax film produced by Greg MacGillivray
