= Stewart Fulton =

Scottish mountaineer

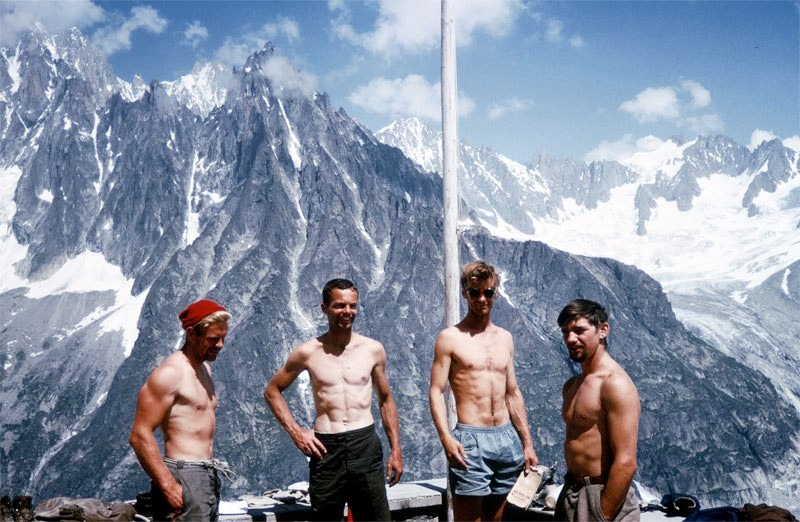
The Fou team re-grouping at the L’Envers des Aiguille Hut in 1963: John Harlin II, Tom Frost, Gary Hemming, and Stewart Fulton.

Stewart Fulton was a mountaineer from Scotland who climbed in the heyday of the "wild ones" in the sixties. This group was credited with putting up many new routes in the Alps during that time, most significantly the first ascent of the south face of the Aiguille Du Fou (with John Harlin, Tom Frost and Gary Hemming) a smooth wall of sheer rock long deemed to be unclimbable.

== Biography ==
Stewart Fulton grew up on the tough streets of Glasgow in the fifties and sixties, an upbringing that gave him the toughness necessary for climbing and a reputation as a formidable wrestler.

"One day on the main street in Leysin, I caught sight of Stewart. He was headed for a local café. I came up from behind him and tapped him on the shoulder. He turned on me with incredible alacrity and violence. His fist literally whistled over my head as I instinctively ducked. Fortunately, he recognized me and reprimanded me for coming upon him like that as his reflexes had been sharpened in the streets of Glasgow and I could have been badly hurt". - Fellow climber Larry Ware

Fulton worked for a time at the Leysin American School in Leysin, Switzerland as a dorm attendant and sports instructor. He also guided at the International School of Mountaineering, founded by John Harlin II. Along with climbing he enjoyed trail running, "I used to take off with Stewart, John and a great Scot runner called Jimmy Ferguson. We ran most of the surrounding hills. In the evening we would gather at the Vagabond Club where after a few well-earned beers we would proceed to start singing - Stewart played a mean banjo if I recall correctly and like to play a few Irish rebel songs" - Larry Ware

"He was a fantastic climber. Once, in Grenoble, while visiting with Gary Hemming, he climbed on sight a 15 meter boulder problem - an overhanging and polished crack - which most of the climbers around there were proud to be able to even top rope. I have since climbed it many a time; I would never do it solo. He did and on sight. Amazing. And, apparently, he was in no way fazed by his accomplishment - he was a rare example of a totally natural climber. That does not mean that he took foolish risks. In the mountains, I have rarely been with a more cautious and responsible companion". - Larry Ware

Stewart Fulton died in an accident while working as an electrical lineman in northern Canada in 1971. Stewart is survived by his daughter, Rebecca, and two grandchildren, Danielle and Jordan.

== Climb of the Aiguille du Fou ==
The Aiguille du Fou was first summited in 1901 but is best known for its south face, a 300-metre sheer rock wall which overlooks the town of Chamonix in the valley below. It was this face that was climbed by the team of Harlin, Frost, Hemming and Fulton in the summer of 1963.

In his book "The Climbers" Chris Bonington described the route as "impressively steep" but unfortunately referred to Stewart Fulton as Steve Fulton.

John Harlin III, whose father was one of the preeminent American climbers of the sixties who died attempting a direct ascent of the Eiger, describes the ascent of the Aiguille du Fou (lunatic's needle) in his book "The Eiger Obsession":

"[Harlin] had first noticed the face two years earlier when he and Gary looked across the Mer de Glace and were stunned by 'one of the smoothest, most beautiful granite faces we had even seen. At that moment we both resolved to climb it."

And further:

"On still another attempt the rain came as they were ascending their fixed ropes in the crack, but they decided to push the route anyway. Stewart was leading a long, unprotected layback in the diagonal crack when he slipped, arching down hard on the one good piton he had managed to place. The rain and Stewart's bruised hand forced a retreat."

The climbers would go on to complete the route, along the way spending a night wet and exposed in an electrical storm on the south face of the mountain. Fulton would later reconnoiter the direttissima route of the Eiger with John Harlin II, but was not on the climb when Harlin fell.
