= Kangtega =

Mountain in Nepal

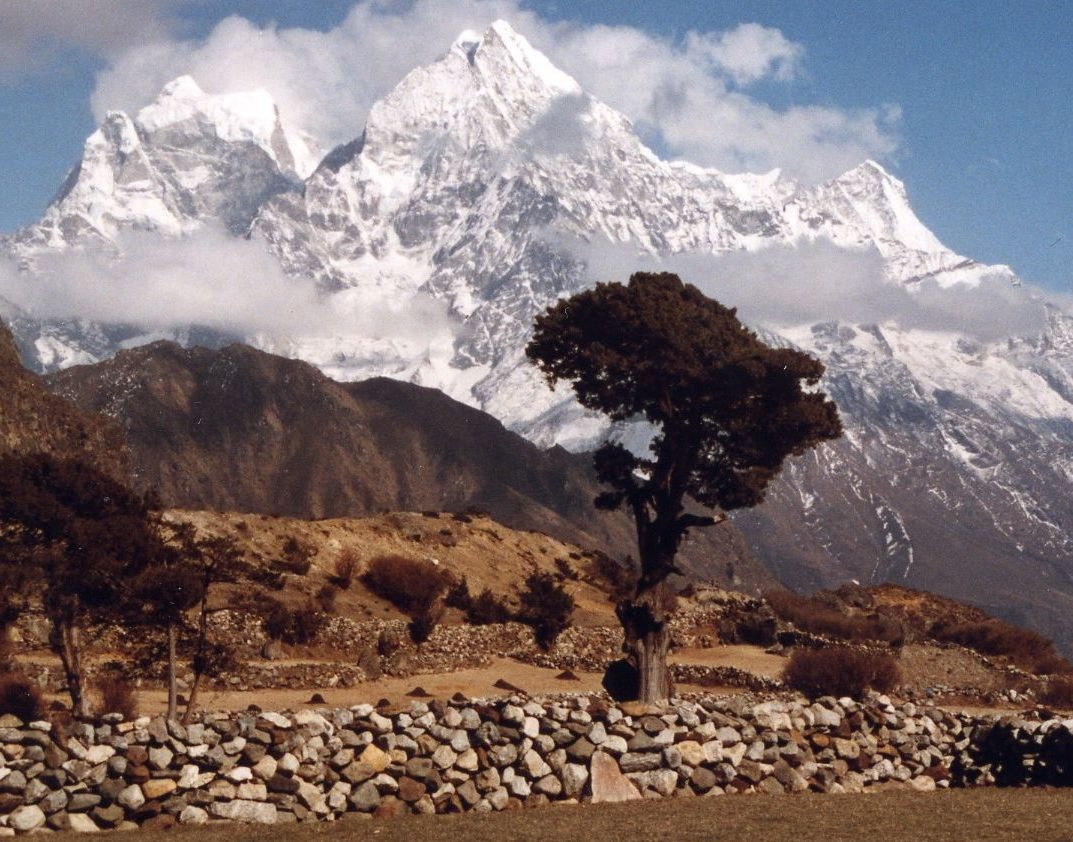
- The north summit of Kangtega is seen to the left. To the right you can see Thamserku

Highest point
- Elevation: 6,782 m (22,251 ft)
- Prominence: 592 m (1,942 ft)
- Coordinates: 27°47′00″N 86°49′00″E

Geography
- Location within Koshi Province Location within Nepal
- Location: Nepal
- Parent range: Himalayas

Climbing
- First ascent: 1963 David Dornan, Tom Frost, Michael Gill, Jim Wilson, in an expedition led by Edmund Hillary.

Kangtega (Nepali: काङ्टेगा), known also as The Snow Saddle, is a major mountain peak of the Himalayas in Nepal. Its summit rises 6,782 metres (22,251 ft). It was first ascended in 1963.

From the Khumbu and Hinku Valley areas, Mount Kangtega rises to a saddle-shaped point, thus earning the name "The Snow Saddle."

== Notable ascents and attempts ==
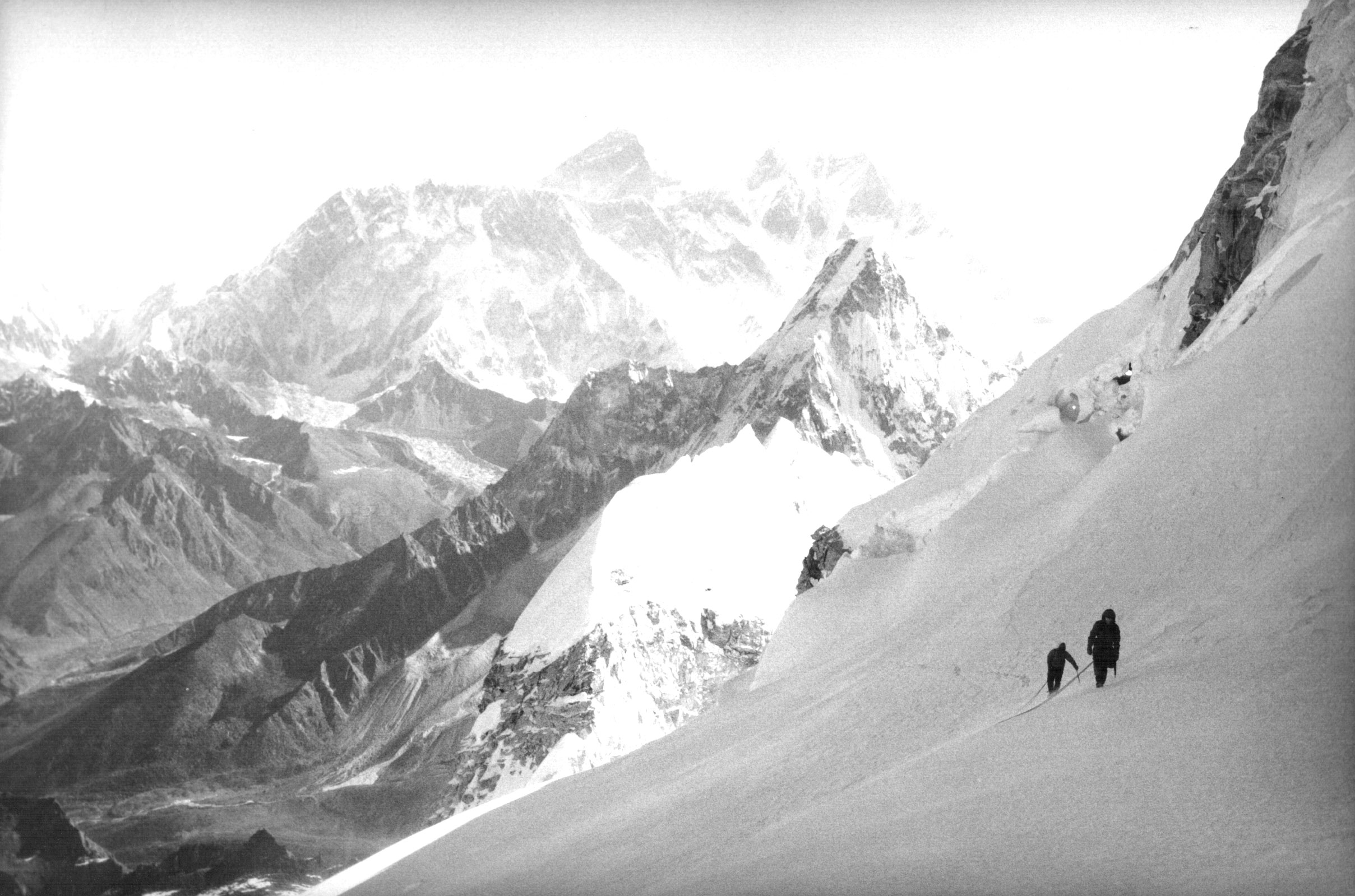
Alison Hargreaves and Jeff Lowe climbing Kangtega (1 May 1986).

- 1986 Northeast Buttress, alpine-style FA of route by Jay Smith, Mark Hesse, Craig Reason and Paul 'Wally' Teare, Oct 22–29.
