= Gary Hemming =

American mountaineer (1934–1969)

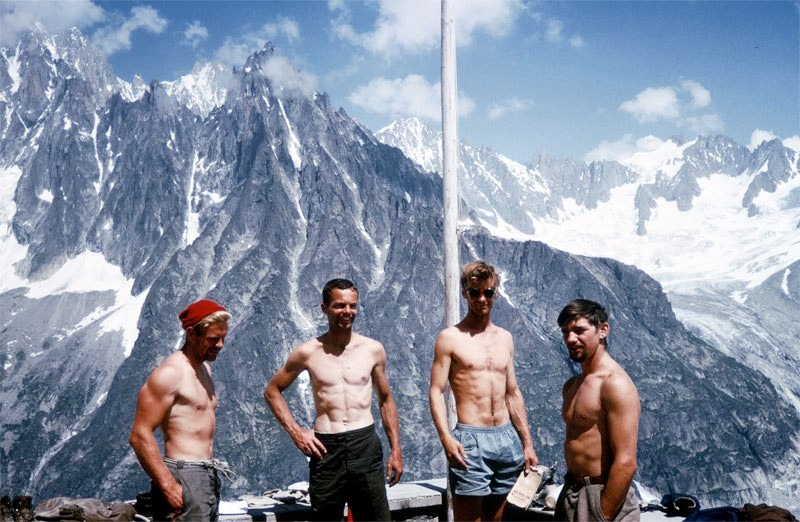
- John Harlin II, Tom Frost, Gary Hemming, and Stewart Fulton at the L’Envers des Aiguille Hut in 1963.
- Born: December 13, 1934; Pasadena, California
- Died: August 6, 1969 (aged 34); Teton County, Wyoming

Gary Hemming (December 13, 1934 – August 6, 1969) was a noted American mountaineer. Together with Royal Robbins he made the first ascent of the American Direct route on the Aiguille du Dru in Chamonix in 1962, and was widely known in France for his role as a rescuer of a party on the same mountain in 1966, earning him the moniker "le beatnik des cimes".

Hemming was also part of the group which put up the first ascent of the south face of the Aiguille du Fou (with John Harlin, Tom Frost and Stewart Fulton) a spire of sheer rock long deemed to be unclimbable.

Hemming died from a self-inflicted gunshot wound outside the Jenny Lake campground in Grand Teton National Park in 1969. Hemming is widely thought to be one of the models for the character named Rand in the James Salter book Solo Faces.

== Quotes about Hemming ==
- "Hemming. The name is singular, like the man." — Jack Turner
- "Gary was big, rawboned tough, and light-haired and had uncannily blue eyes. His most arresting physical feature was his grin. It combined the innocence of a friendly, lively eight-year-old and the cynicism of an old satyr who has seen it all. He was reckless with his passions, had an insatiable appetite for what he (and I) called life, and an alarming capacity for suffering." — Pete Sinclair
