= John Harlin =

American mountaineer (1935–1966)

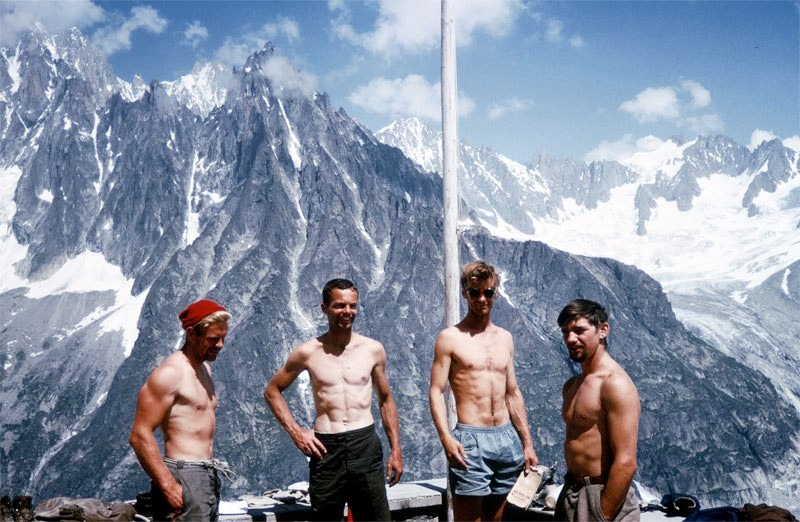
John Harlin, Tom Frost, Gary Hemming, and Stewart Fulton at the L’Envers des Aiguille Hut in 1963.

John Elvis Harlin II (June 30, 1935 – March 22, 1966) was an American alpinist and US Air Force pilot who was killed while making an ascent of the north face of the Eiger at age 30.

== Biography ==
Harlin graduated from Sequoia High School and Stanford University.

Having established himself as a leading alpine climber with the first American ascent in 1962 of the 1938 Heckmair Route on the north face of the Eiger, and the first ascent of the American Direct route on Les Dru, he conceived of climbing the Eiger by a direttissima (Italian for "most direct") route. Two thousand feet from the summit, his rope broke and he fell to his death in 1966. The Scottish mountaineer Dougal Haston, who had been climbing with Harlin, reached the summit with a German party which joined forces to follow the same route, afterward named the Harlin route in his honor. The story of the climb was recounted in the book Eiger Direct by the British author (and ground team member) Peter Gillman and Dougal Haston.

In 1965, Harlin founded the "International School of Modern Mountaineering" in Leysin, Switzerland (the word "Modern" was later dropped from the title.) Harlin had previously worked as sports director at the Leysin American School.

Harlin's son, John Harlin III, who was nine at the time of his father's death, is also a mountaineer and was the editor-in-chief of the American Alpine Club's American Alpine Journal. Harlin III, himself a climber and author of five books, recently climbed the Eiger by the original Heckmair route. He has written a book about his experience, The Eiger Obsession. A film of the son's climb to exorcise the ghosts left by his father's death came out in May 2007: The Alps, an Imax with footage of the north face of the Eiger as well as other Alpine peaks.

== First ascents ==
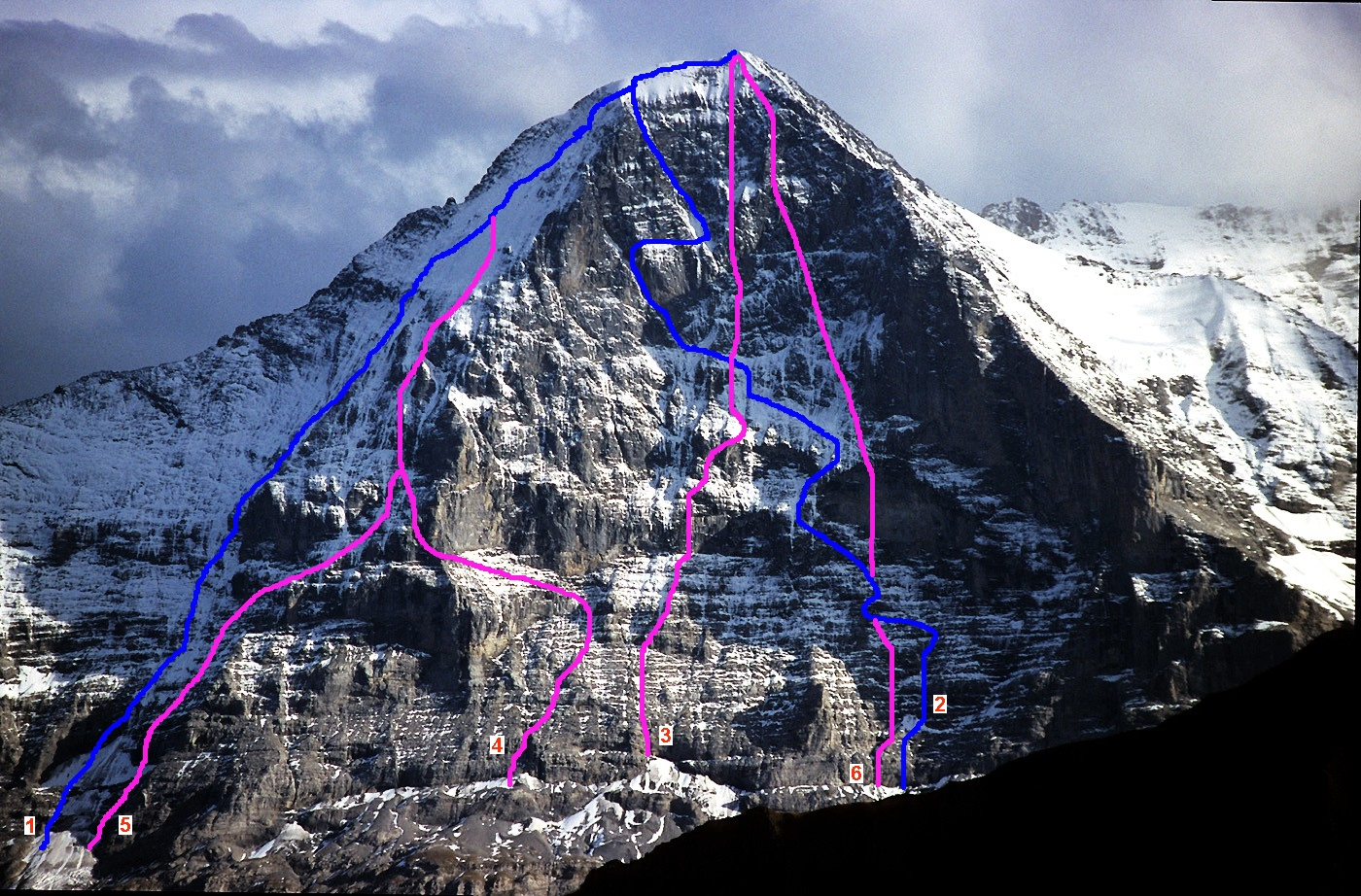
North face of the Eiger: The original 1938 Heckmair Route (blue-line #2), contrasts with the 1966 Harlin Direttissima (pink-line #3), and the 1969 Japanese Direttissima (pink-line #6). Not shown is the 2006 Russian Direttissima which is an almost straight vertical line between the Harlin and Japanese routes.

- 1964 Cime de l'Est NE ridge, Dents du Midi, Valais, Switzerland. With Chris Bonington and Rusty Baillie
- 1965 American Direttissima, Aiguille du Dru, Mont Blanc Range, France. With Royal Robbins.
