= Thamserku =

Mountain in Nepal

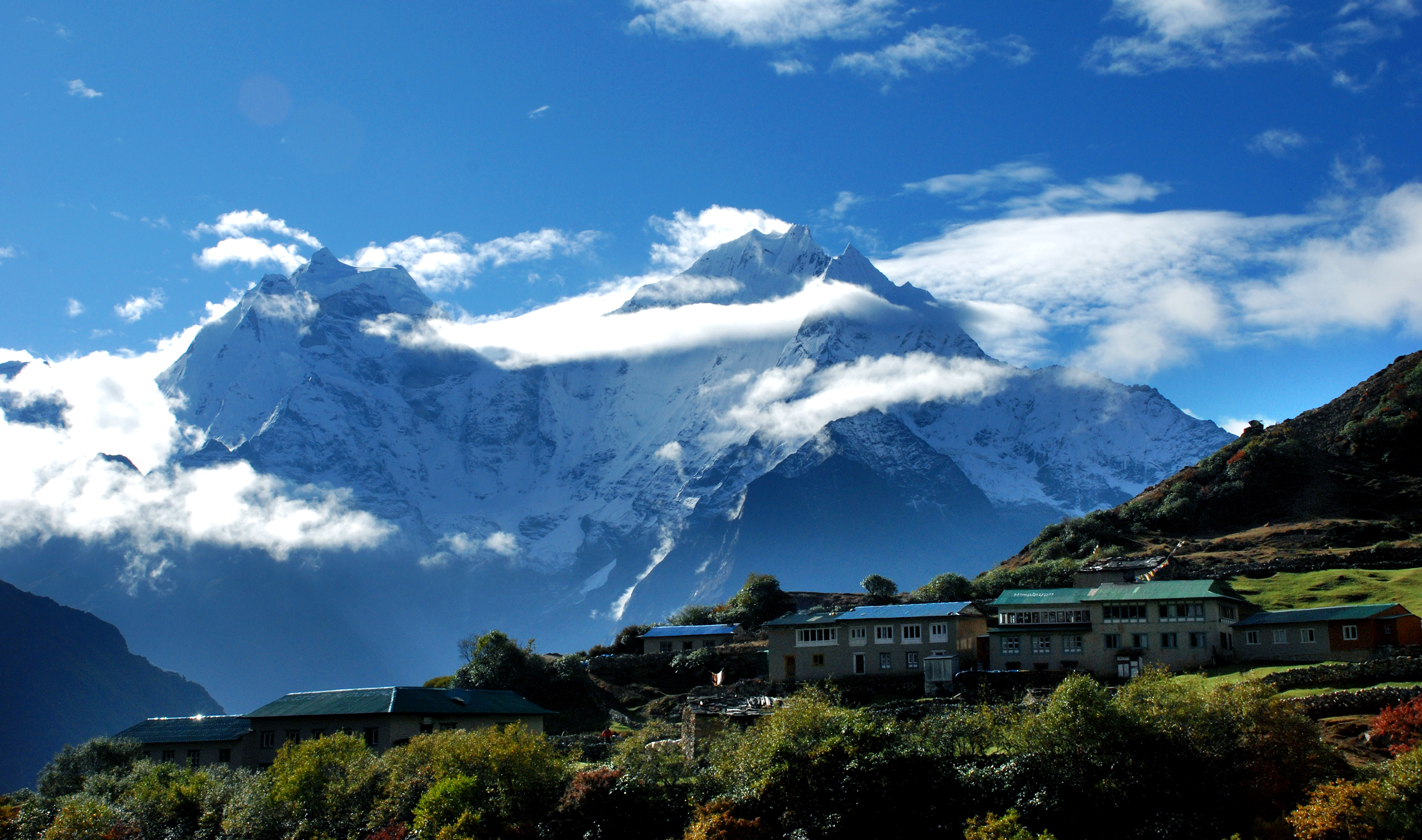
- Dole village and Mt. Thamserku (to the right) and Kangtega (to the left)

Highest point
- Elevation: 6,623 m (21,729 ft)
- Prominence: 689 m (2,260 ft)
- Coordinates: 27°47′25″N 86°47′15″E

Geography
- Location within Nepal
- Location: Khumbu, Nepal
- Parent range: Himalayas

Climbing
- First ascent: 1964 by Lynn Crawford, Peter Farrell, John McKinnon, and Richard Stewart
- Easiest route: Snow/ice climb

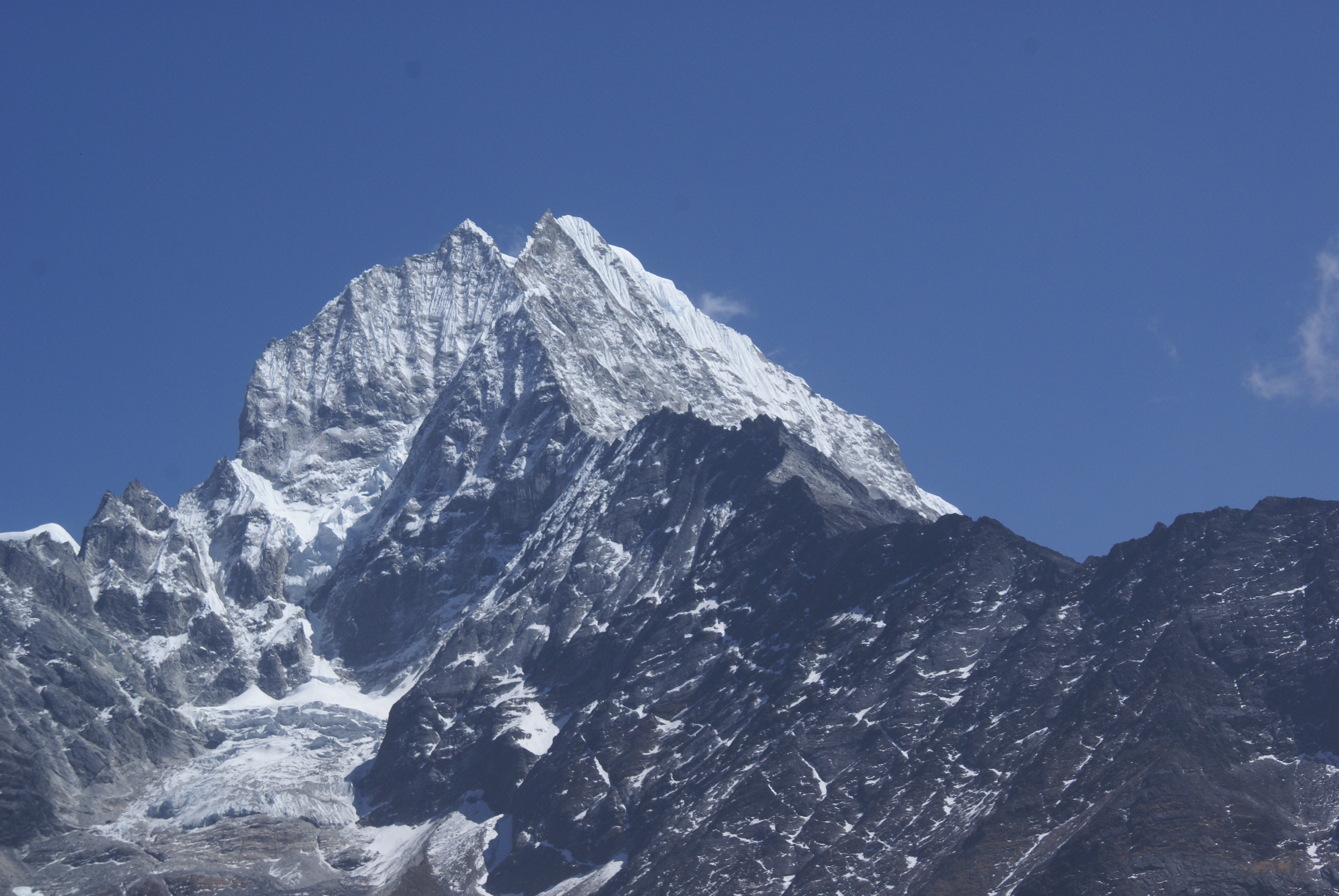
Thamserku, view from Khumjung

Thamserku is a mountain in the Himalayas of eastern Nepal. The mountain is connected by a ridge leading eastward to Kangtega. Thamserku is a prominent mountain to the east of Namche Bazaar and lies just north of Kusum Kangguru.

The first ascent was made in 1964 from the south by members of Edmund Hillary's Schoolhouse Expedition: Lynn Crawford, Pete Farrell, John McKinnon and Richard Stewart. Below the basin on the southwest face, they reached the south ridge after climbing a difficult couloir. The team described the climb as difficult and the route has never again been repeated in its entirety. In 2014, Russian climbers Alexander Gukov and Alexey Lonchinskiy made the first ascent on the southwest face.
