= Tom Frost =

American rock climber (1936–2018)

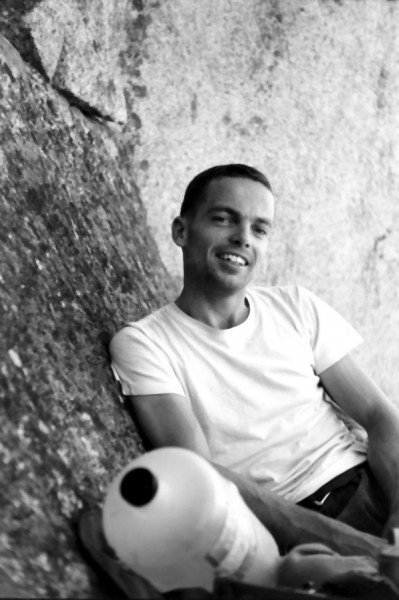
- Frost during the second ascent of The Nose route on El Capitan in 1961

Personal information
- Born: June 30, 1936 Newport, California, US
- Died: August 24, 2018 (aged 82) Oakdale, California, US

Climbing career
- Type of climber: rock climbing, big wall climbing
- Known for: first ascents in Yosemite Valley

Thomas "Tom" M. Frost (June 30, 1936 – August 24, 2018) was an American rock climber known for big wall climbing first ascents in Yosemite Valley. He was also a photographer and climbing equipment manufacturer. Frost was born in Hollywood, California, and died in Oakdale, California.

== Rock climbing and mountaineering ==
Frost grew up in Newport, California and was a sailing champion as a teenager, winning the Snipe National Championship in 1953 and 1954.

In 1958, he graduated with a degree in mechanical engineering from Stanford University, where he was a member of the Stanford Alpine Club.

Frost began making first ascents in Yosemite in 1958. In 1960, he made the second ascent of The Nose on El Capitan in Yosemite Valley, a route pioneered by Warren Harding in 1958. He climbed with Royal Robbins, Chuck Pratt and Joe Fitschen.

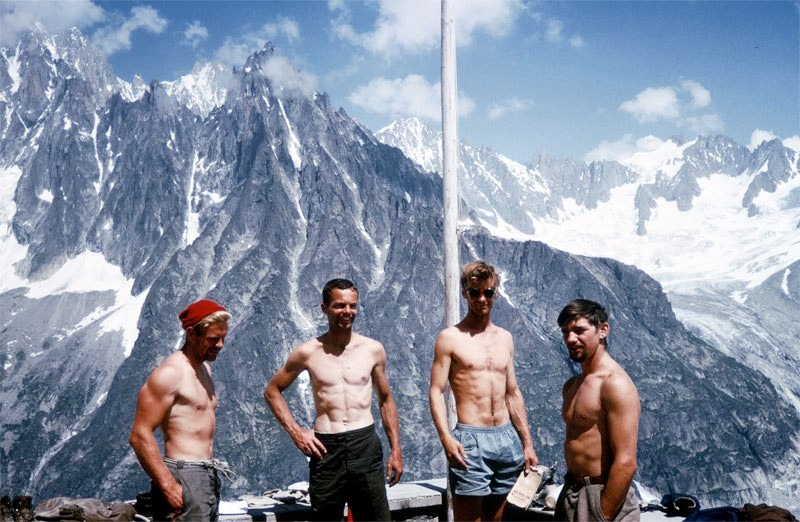
John Harlin II, Tom Frost, Gary Hemming, and Stewart Fulton at the L’Envers des Aiguille Hut in 1963.

In 1961, Frost and Yvon Chouinard visited the Tetons, and made the first ascent of the northeast face of Disappointment Peak, its difficulty rated IV, 5.9, A3, according to the Yosemite Decimal System (YDS).

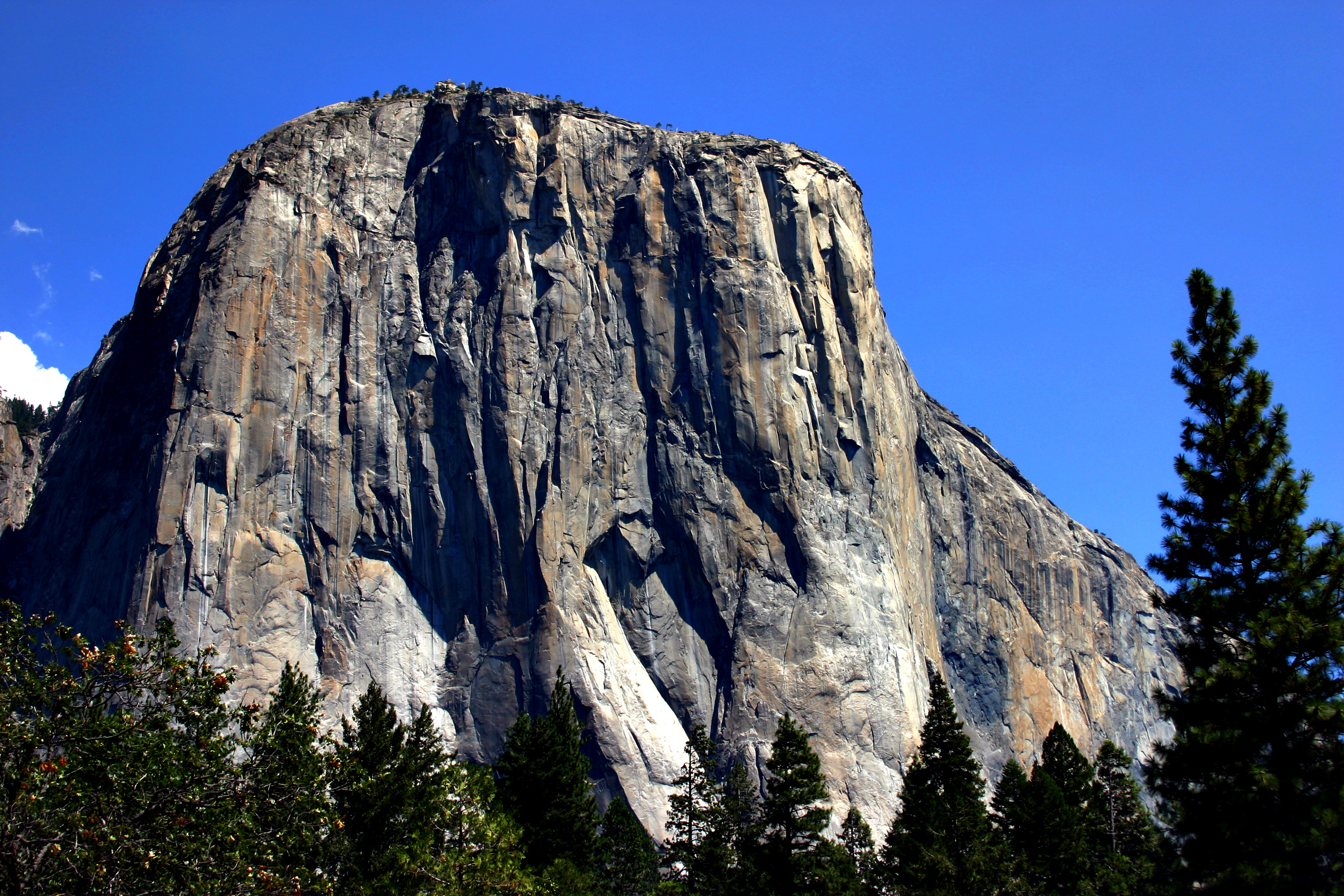
The southwest face of El Capitan from Yosemite Valley. Salathé Wall takes a line up the central part of the face.

On September 12, 1961, Frost, along with Robbins, began the first ascent of the Salathé Wall on El Capitan, named for pioneer Yosemite climber John Salathé. The pair spent two days establishing the first 600 feet of the route, and then retreated to the valley floor, where they met up with Chuck Pratt, with whom they spent several more days pushing the route to 1,000 feet above the valley floor. Once again, the climbers descended and resupplied. On September 19, they resumed the climb, and after days of intense vertical aid climbing they reached the Roof, a 15-foot overhang. Using pitons, Frost led this key section of the climb, and on September 24, the trio reached the summit. It had taken them a total of 11 days and 36 pitches of vertical climbing to finish the route, which is rated YDS VI, 5.10, A3.

In 1963, he visited the Himalaya with Edmund Hillary, making the first ascent of Kangtega, and helping with the construction of a school and a hospital for the Sherpas.

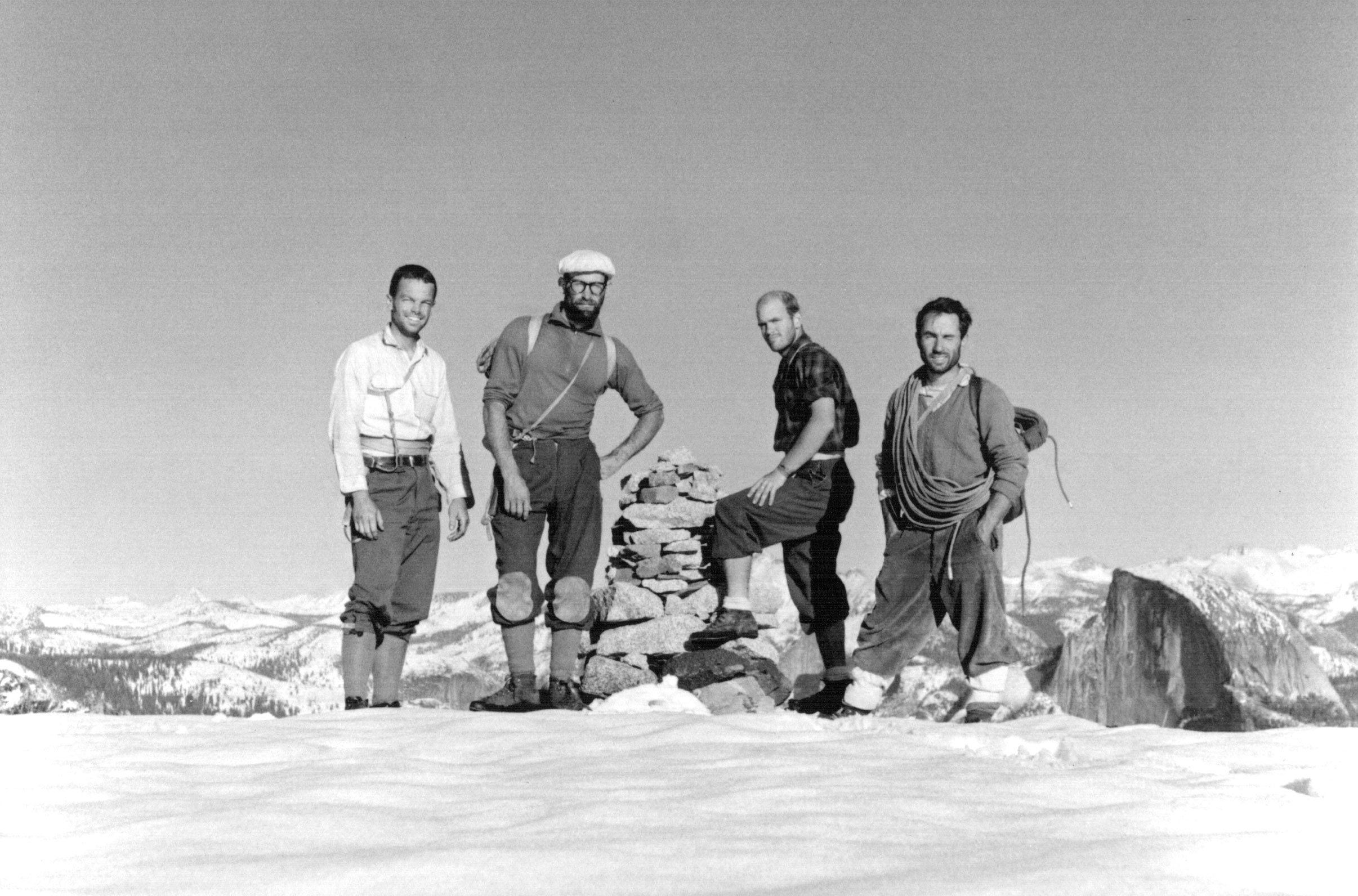
Frost, Robbins, Pratt and Chouinard at the completion of the first ascent of the North America Wall on El Capitan in 1964. Photo by Tom Frost.

From October 22–31, 1964, with Robbins, Pratt and Chouinard, Frost made the first ascent of the North America Wall on El Capitan, YDS VI, 5.8, A5. Robbins described this climb in the 1965 American Alpine Journal: "The nine-day first ascent of the North America Wall in 1964 not only was the first one-push first ascent of an El Capitan climb, but a major breakthrough in other ways. We learned that our minds and bodies never stopped adjusting to the situation. We were able to live and work and sleep in comparative comfort in a vertical environment." Of this climb, Chris Jones wrote, "For the first time in the history of the sport, Americans lead the world."

Frost was recruited by Barry Bishop to join a team on a secretive mission to Nanda Devi in 1965. The joint CIA / Indian Intelligence Bureau mission involved placing a nuclear powered listening device on the mountain with subsequent visits to Nanda Devi and Nanda Kot 1966 and 1967.

In 1968, Frost visited the Cirque of the Unclimbables in the Northwest Territories of Canada. From August 10 to August 13, along with Jim McCarthy and Sandy Bill, he made the first ascent of the vertical southeast face of the 2,200-foot granite pillar named the Lotus Flower Tower, YDS V, 5.8, A2.

In 1970, he participated in the 1970 Annapurna South Face expedition, reaching 25,000 feet.

In 1979, he reached the summit of Ama Dablam on a filming expedition.

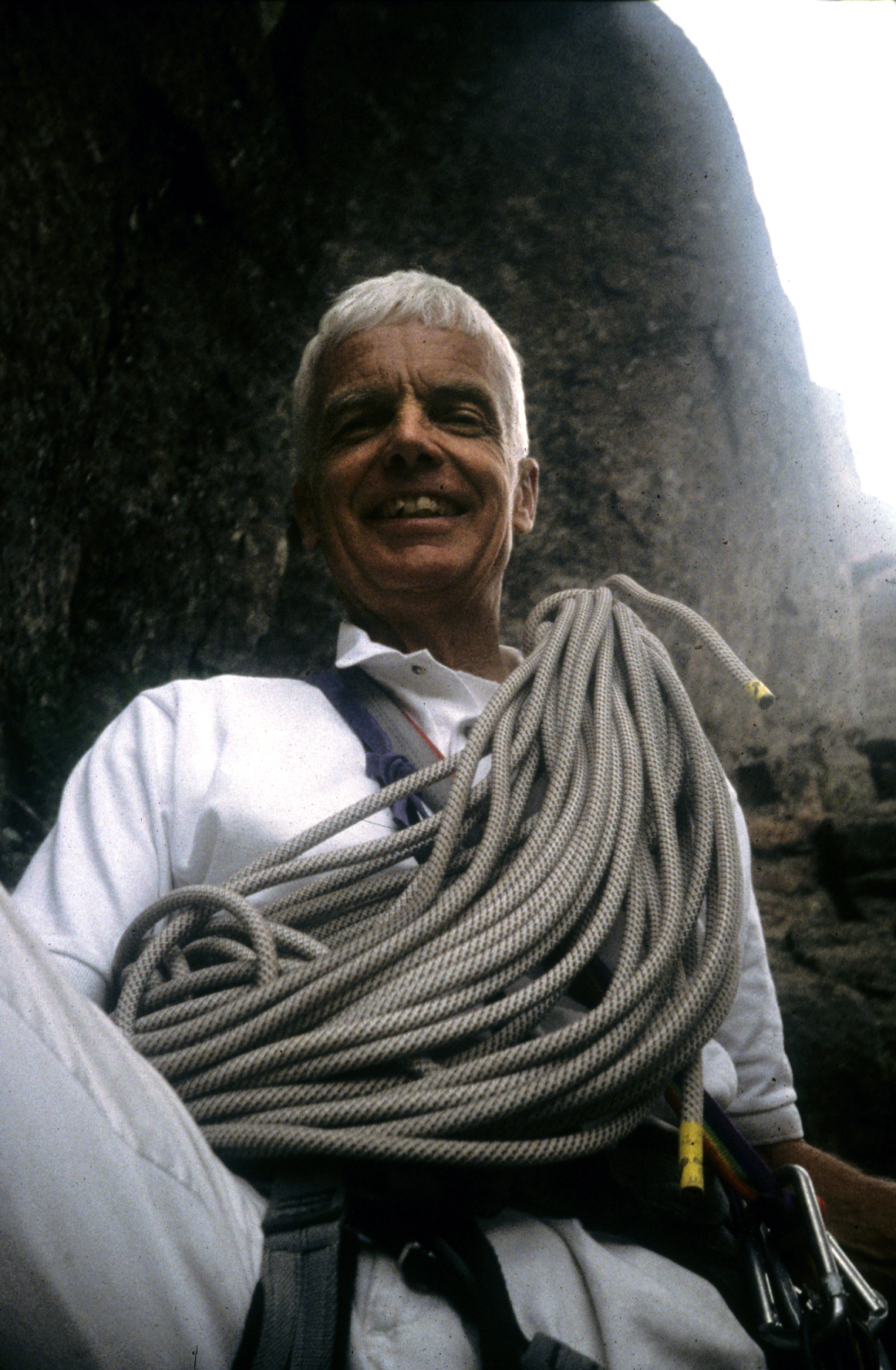
Tom Frost in Eldorado Canyon, Colorado, in the late 1980s

In 1986, he returned to Kangtega and climbed a new route with Jeff Lowe.

From 1997 to 2001, he returned to Yosemite big wall climbing with his son Ryan, repeating the Nose, the North America Wall and finally, the Salathé Wall on the 40th anniversary of his first ascent.

== Notable first ascents ==
- 1961 Salathé Wall, El Capitan, Yosemite Valley, California, US. Hardest big wall grade VI climb in world at time of first ascent, with Royal Robbins and Chuck Pratt.
- 1962 Northeast Face, Disappointment Peak, Teton Range, Wyoming (IV 5.9 A3) FA with Yvon Chouinard.
- 1964 North American Wall, El Capitan, Yosemite Valley (VI 5.8 A5 3000') – First Ascent with Royal Robbins, Yvon Chouinard and Chuck Pratt.

== Photography ==
Frost photographed many of his first ascents. Glen Denny, also a mountaineering photographer and author of the book Yosemite in the Sixties, wrote of Frost's photographic achievements: "Most of the climbing photos you see now are prearranged setups for the camera on much-traveled routes. The impressive thing about Frost is that his classic images were seen, and photographed, during major first ascents. In those awesome situations he led, cleaned, hauled, day after day and – somehow – used his camera with the acuity of a Cartier-Bresson strolling about a piazza. Extremes of heat and cold, storm and high altitude, fear and exhaustion ... it didn't matter. He didn't seem to feel the pressure."

Several of Frost's photos were published in Royal Robbins' book, Advanced Rockcraft, in 1973. Frost was also an ice climber, and contributed dozens of photographs to Yvon Chouinard's book Climbing Ice. Nine of his photographs appeared in the book Fifty Classic Climbs of North America. Many of his photos appeared in Pat Ament's Royal Robbins: Spirit of the Age.

In 1979, he co-founded Chimera Photographic Lighting with Gary Regester. The company, based in Boulder, Colorado, manufactures lighting products for photography and filming.

== Climbing philosophy and activism ==
Frost was a longtime advocate of environmental ethics in climbing, using natural protection whenever possible, guided by respect for tradition and a desire to "leave no trace". He articulated his climbing philosophy in an address to an international congress called "The Future of Mountain Sports", held in Innsbruck, Austria in September, 2002. He opposed what he believed to be excessive use of bolts by sport climbers, especially the altering of traditional climbing routes previously completed without such aids. He criticized such practices as the result of a desire by some climbers for "instant gratification with little or no accountability". He opposed five attitudes as the culprits of modern climbing: "selfishness – entitlement – lack of self management – mis-education – and disrespect."

Starting in 1997, Frost played a critical role in the fight to stop the National Park Service from constructing employee dormitories near Camp 4, a historic rockclimber's campsite in Yosemite Valley, arguing that the buildings would disturb the camp's natural setting. With the support of other activists, Frost initiated a lawsuit against the Park Service, which was joined by the American Alpine Club. As part of their attempt to stop the construction project, Frost and his attorney Dick Duane also filed an application to have Camp 4 listed on the National Register of Historic Places. The park officials ultimately agreed to stop the development plans and to support the NRHP application, which was granted in 2003, based on the camp's "significant association with the growth and development of rock climbing in the Yosemite Valley during the 'golden years' of pioneer mountaineering".

In 2002, Royal Robbins offered the following description of Frost: "Tom is the kindest and gentlest and most generous person I have ever met, with never an ill word to say of anyone. He is also a man of courage and leadership, as witness his recent vanguard role in the effort to save Camp 4 in Yosemite. And he continues to possess the true spirit of climbing."

== Climbing equipment ==
While working on the first ascent of Kat Pinnacle with Chouinard in 1959, the pair designed and fabricated the Realized Ultimate Reality Piton or RURP, a tiny device that allowed them to finish the most difficult aid climb then completed in North America. This led to a lengthy partnership between Frost and Chouinard in climbing equipment companies such as the Great Pacific Iron Works and Chouinard, Ltd. Frost described his profession as "piton engineer".

In the late 1960s, Frost and Chouinard turned their attention to ice climbing and its specialized equipment. They developed an alpine hammer with a drooping pick. Although Austrian climbers had improvised rigid crampons decades before by welding a bar across the hinge of conventional crampons, such devices were not commercially available until 1967. That year, Chouinard and Frost began marketing adjustable rigid crampons made of chrome-molybdenum steel.

Frost and Chouinard invented the climbing protection device called the Hexentric. They applied for a United States patent in 1974 and it was granted on April 6, 1976. These are still manufactured by Black Diamond Equipment, a successor to earlier companies owned by Frost and Chouinard.

Since 1997, Frost owned a business manufacturing rock climbing equipment called Frostworks.

== Gallery of Tom Frost photos ==
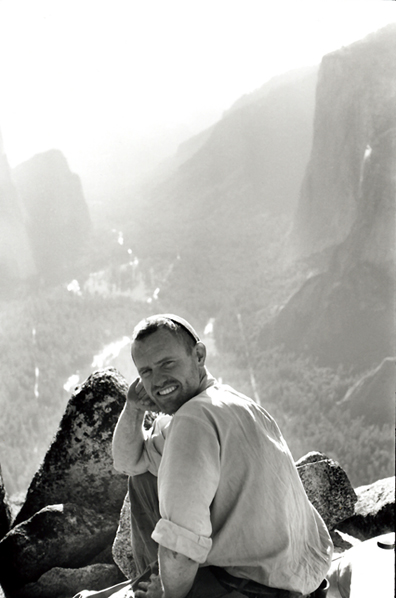
Nobel Prize–winning physicist Henry Kendall

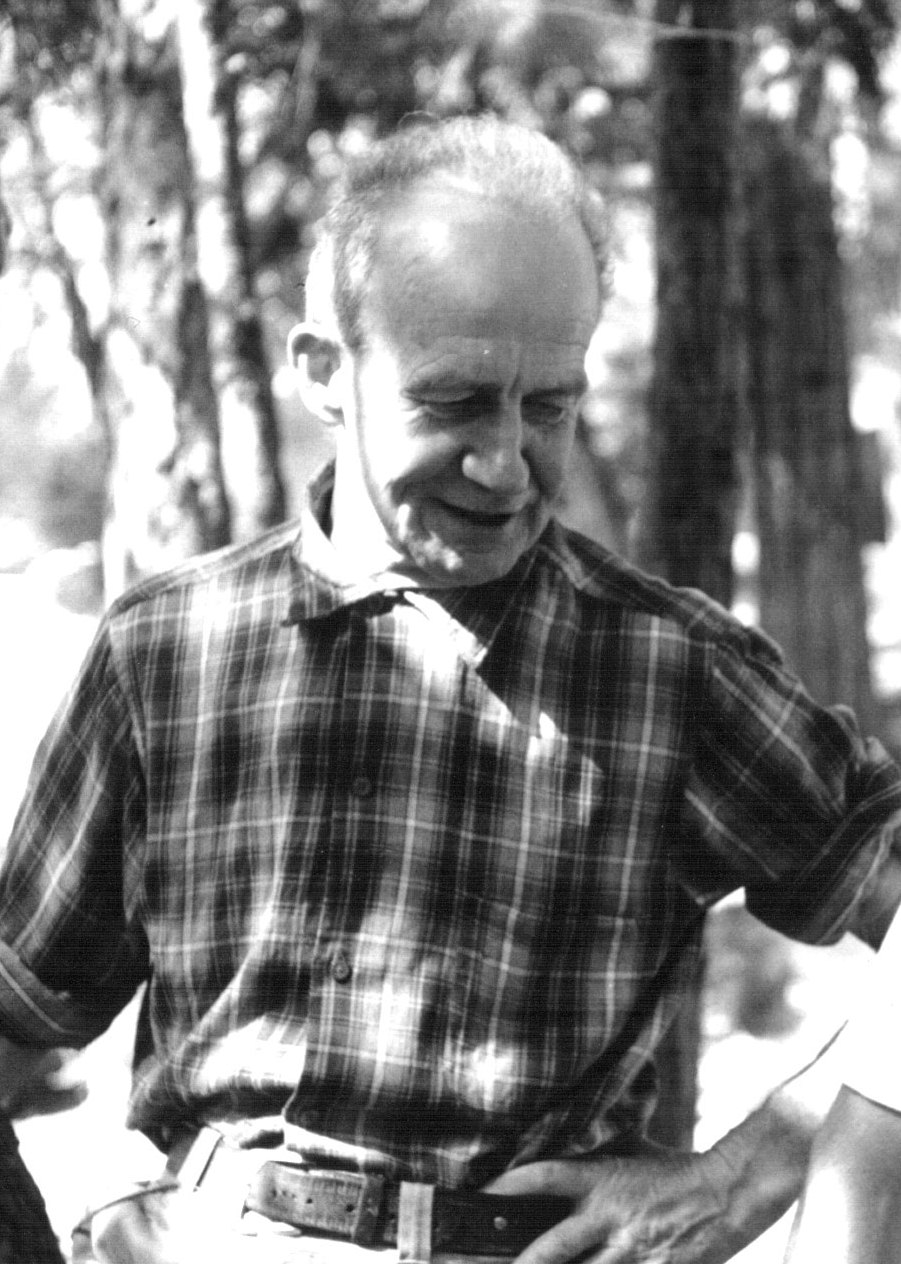
Piton inventor and climber John Salathé

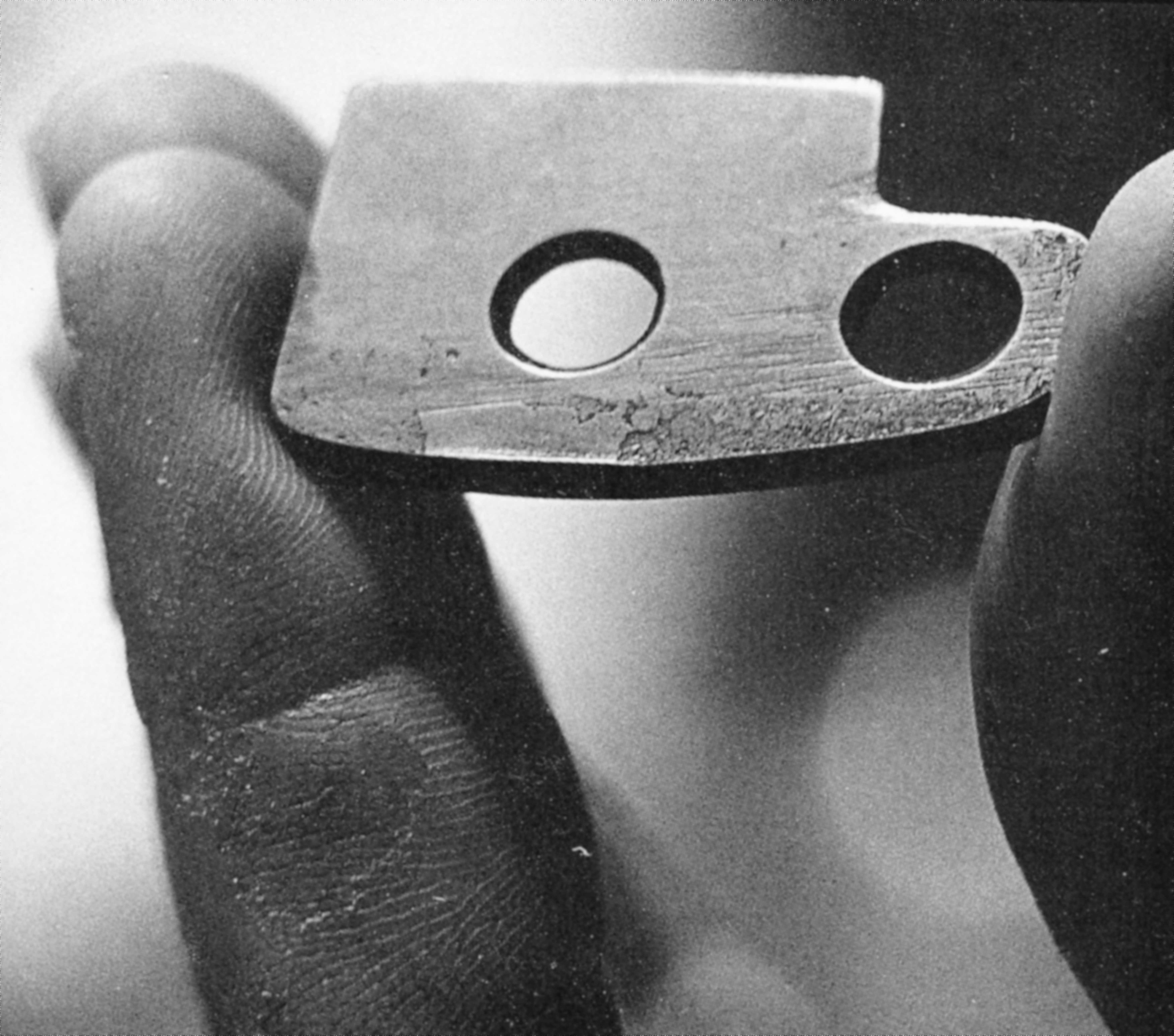
RURP (Realized Ultimate Reality Piton), a tiny piton

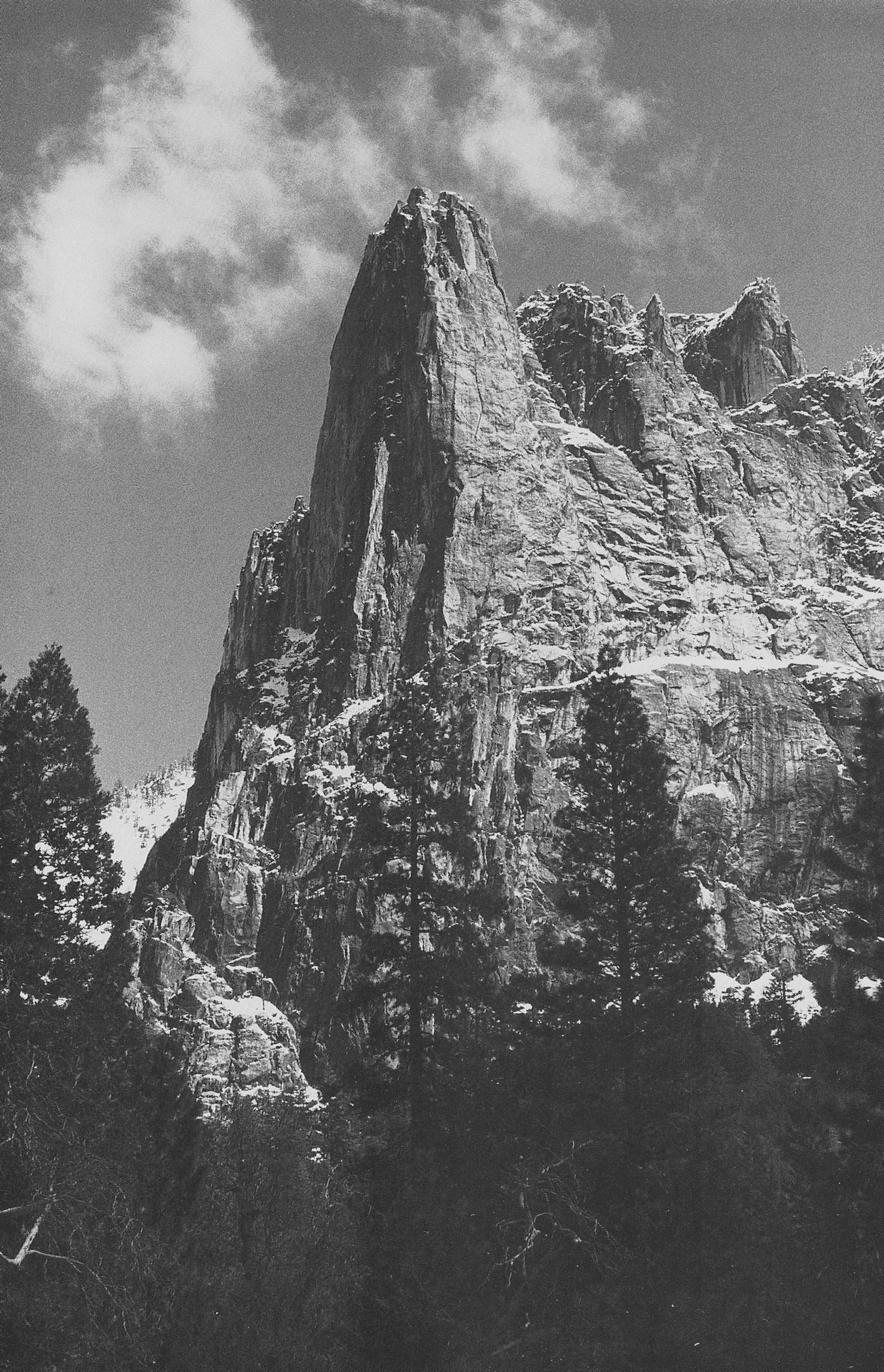
Sentinel Rock in Yosemite Valley

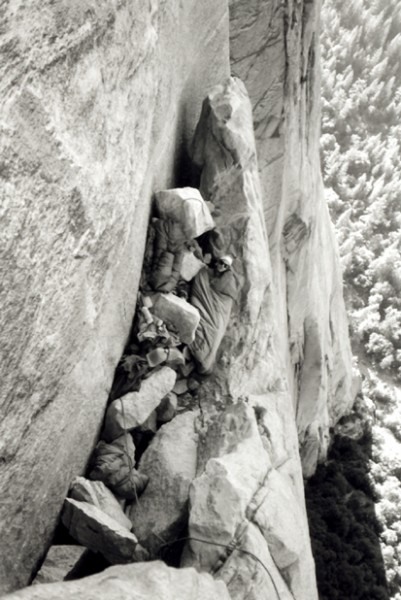
Chuck Pratt bivouacking on El Capitan

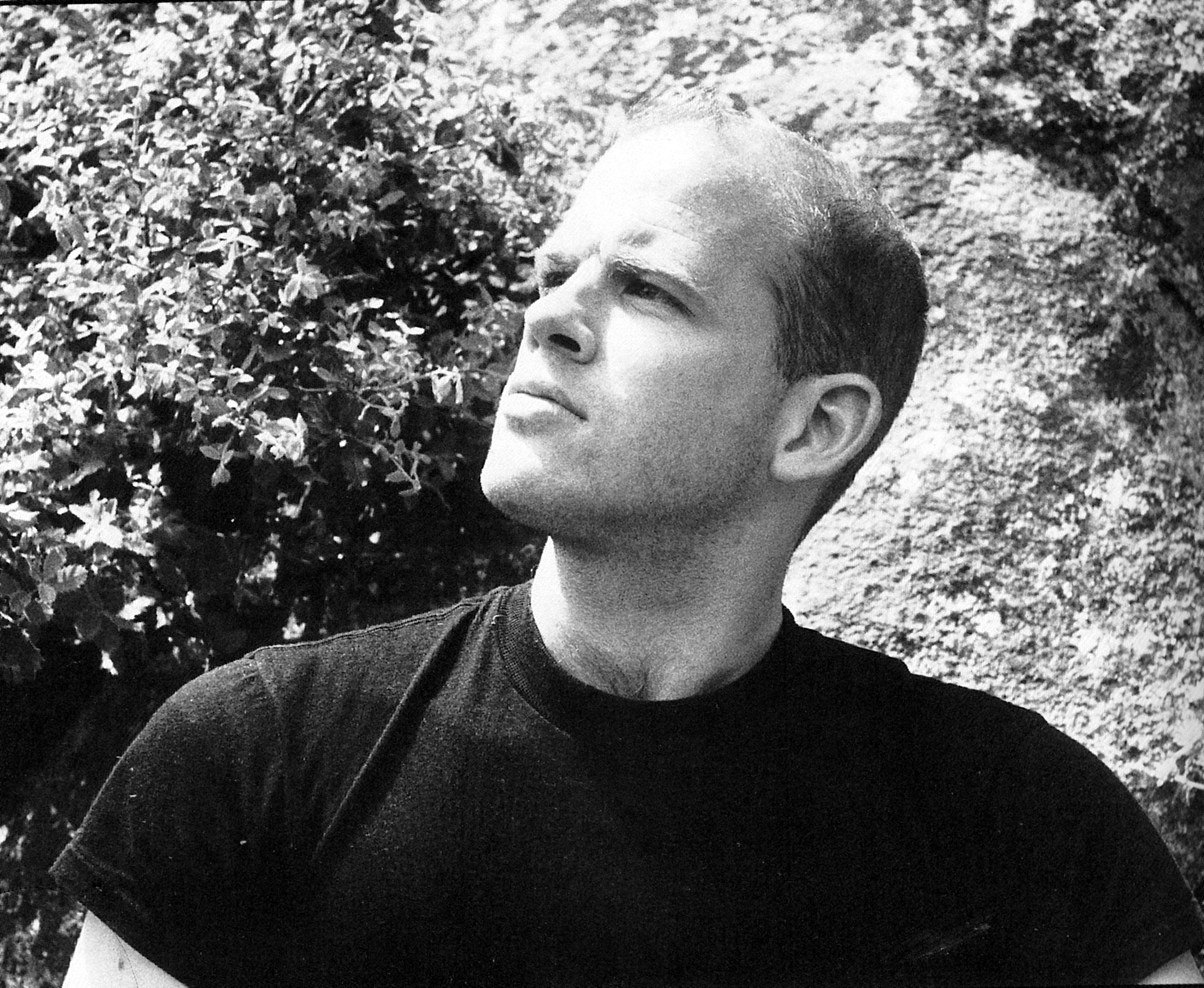
Rock climber Chuck Pratt

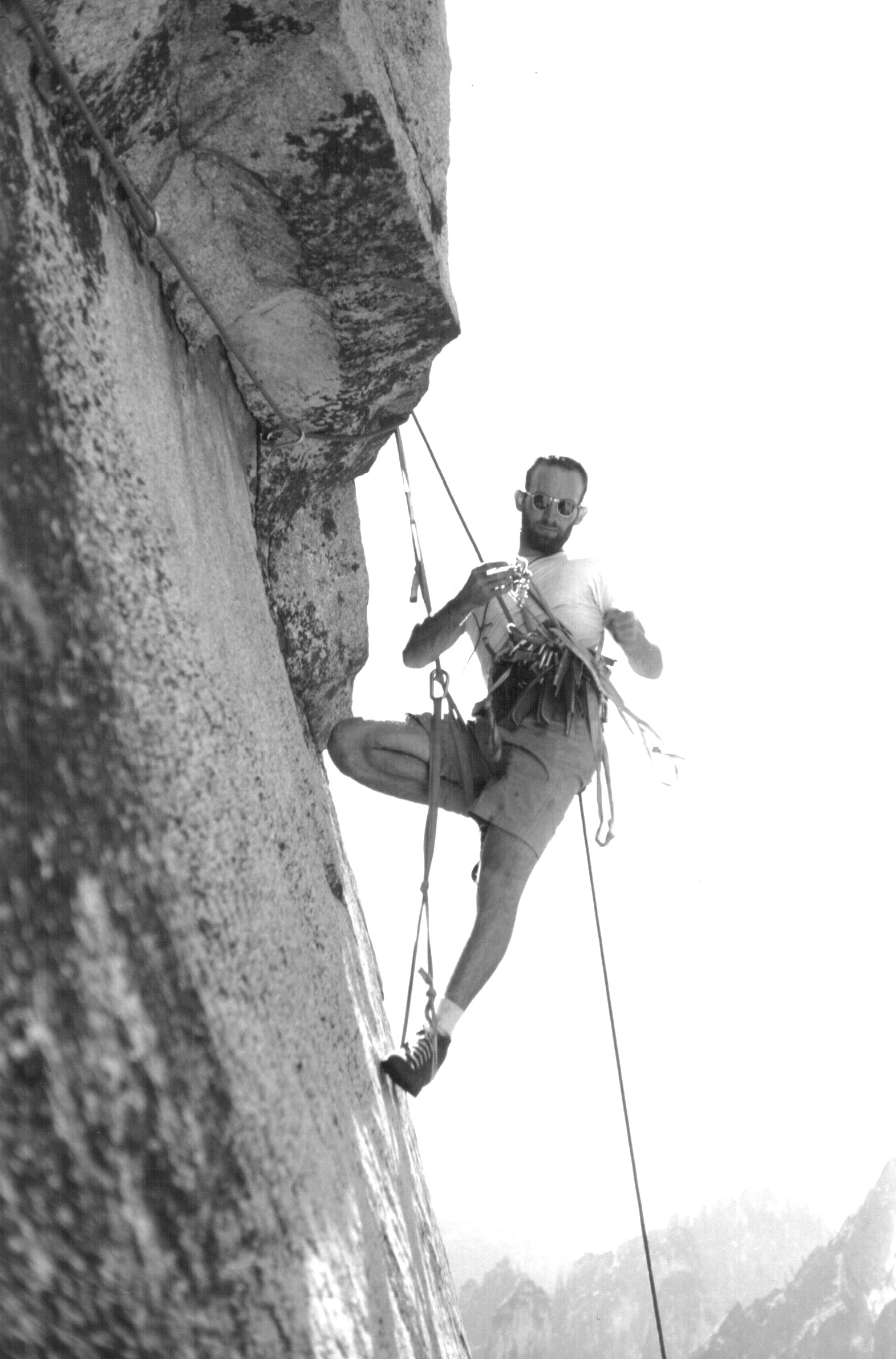
Rock climber Royal Robbins on El Capitan

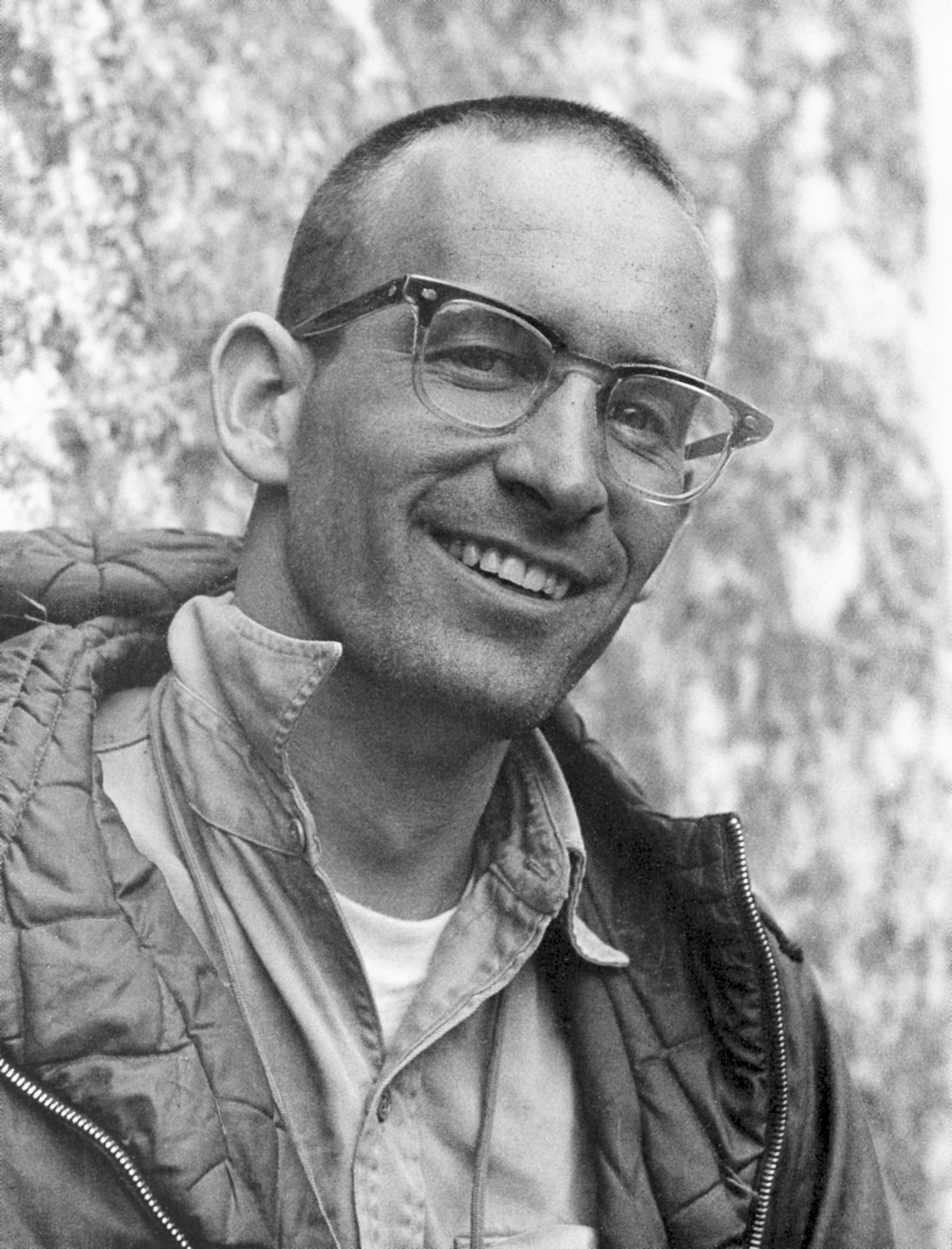
Rock climber Royal Robbins
