= Les Praz =

Mountain village in the French Alps

Coordinates: 45°56′22″N 6°53′5″E

Les-Praz-de-Chamonix (more commonly known as Les Praz) is a mountain village in the French Alps, part of the commune of Chamonix. Altitude: 1060 m (3477 ft.).

== Geography ==
Les Praz is located in the middle of the valley of Chamonix. It is connected to Switzerland by the pass over the Col des Montets, and the Col de la Forclaz to Martigny in the Rhône valley. Les Praz is the starting point for the cable car up to La Flégère, which is well known for skiing and snowboarding in winter or hiking and mountain biking in summer. Peaks on the west side of the village include the Aiguilles Rouges, much of which are a nature reserve. On the east side, the sky is dominated by the Aiguille du Dru and to the south by Mont Blanc.
