= Arthur Wakefield (physician) =

English physician and mountaineer (1876-1949)

Arthur William Wakefield
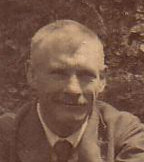
- Arthur Wakefield, Everest 1922
- Born: Arthur William Wakefield; 13 April 1876
- Died: 22 February 1949 (aged 72)
- Education: Trinity College, Cambridge
- Occupation: Physician
- Known for: 1922 British Mount Everest Expedition
- Spouse: Marjorie Younger (m. 1910)
- Military career
- Allegiance: United Kingdom
- Branch: British Army
- Rank: Captain
- Unit: Royal Canadian Army Medical Corps
- Conflicts: Second Boer War; First World War

Olympic medal record

Men's Alpinism

Representing United Kingdom

Olympic Games
| Gold medal – first place | 1924 Chamonix | Everest expedition |

Arthur William Wakefield, MA, MBBCh, MD (Cantab), MRCS, MRCP (13 April 1876 – 22 February 1949) was an English physician, explorer, and mountaineer. He is most famous for serving as the physician and climber during the 1922 British Mount Everest Expedition and was awarded an Olympic Gold Medal by Pierre de Coubertin for his achievements in mountaineering (Alpinism) in 1924 as part of the team.

== Early life ==
Arthur Wakefield was the son of William Henry Wakefield (1825-1893), President of the Wakefield Bank in Kendal. He was educated at Sedbergh School where he was Captain of the football team and then Trinity College, Cambridge where he got a half-Blue in cycling, rowed head of the river, and boxed at middleweight against Oxford. Unlike both of his nephews, Sir Wavell Wakefield and Roger Cuthbert Wakefield, who went on to play professional rugby, Arthur Wakefield graduated with a Master of Arts (M.A.)

He chose to study medicine and in 1904 he took his M.R.C.P. – M.R.C.S. (London). As a resident at the Royal London Hospital, he won the heavy-weight boxing championships of the United Hospitals, before becoming captain of their swim team in 1906. Arthur Wakefield codified what it took to make the Lake District Twenty-Four Fell Record by stating that "the aim of these walks is to ascend the greatest possible number of peaks above 2,000 feet, and to return to the starting point within 24 hours, or as much less as is possible." In 1904, Wakefield set his first fell walking record covering 11 fells in 19 hours and 53 minutes, reaching a height of 16,000 feet over 64 miles. He improved upon this in 1905 covering 21 fells in 22 hours and 7 minutes, reaching a height of 23,500 feet (7,200 m) over 59 miles (95 km). That record stood until 1920.

== War years ==
Arthur Wakefield was one of the first Sharpshooters, joining the 70 Company, 18 Battalion, Imperial Yeomanry during the Second Boer War. This Battalion, designated as "Sharpshooters", was raised on 7 March 1900 by the Earl of Dunraven. Each volunteer had to prove their skill with a rifle and their horsemanship. The battalion was formally inspected by the Prince of Wales outside Chelsea Barracks on 29 March 1900. Wakefield arrived in South Africa in April 1900 and travelled to Rhodesia (now Zimbabwe) as part of a force intending to threaten the Boer Republics from the North. His battalion later entered the Orange Free State dealing with what would become a guerrilla war. Wakefield returned to the London Hospital after the war, spending a year studying at Heidelberg and in Edinburgh. In 1905, he took his MBBCh, and in 1909, his MD (Cantab).

From 1908 to 1914, Wakefield was the Medical Officer to the Fishermen's Mission where he worked with Wilfred Grenfell, who established a series of remote missions along the shores of Newfoundland and Labrador. As one of only two qualified doctors in the entire land, Wakefield travelled by dog team, horse, reindeer or on foot, patrolling the entire length of Labrador, a coastline of nearly 5,000 miles, treating everything from beriberi and tuberculosis to bullet wounds.

Still in the early days of World War I, Wakefield requested a transfer on 17 August 1915 to the Royal Army Medical Corps (RAMC) where he was attached to the 29th Casualty Clearing Station during the Battle of the Somme. Located out of immediate threat of fire, yet as close to the front line as possible, the CCS was both a hospital and a clearing house. The National Army Museum called the 1916 Somme offensive one of the largest and bloodiest battles, with 57,000 casualties on 1 July, the opening day of the attack.

On 23 Jan 1917, Wakefield passed the required examination and was promoted to Captain. He transferred to the Canadian Army Medical Corp (CAMC), and began serving on a series of hospital ships, beginning with HMHS Letitia. This ship ran aground and sank on 17 September 1917, during which Wakefield was commended for exceptional service in transferring the wounded. The CAMC staff previously allocated to HMHS Letitia proceeded to take over the hospital on HMHS Araguyaya.

In February 1918, Wakefield left the hospital ships, joining the No. 2 Canadian Stationary Canadian hospital in France. In March 1918, Wakefield was brought to the notice of the Secretary of State for War for valuable services rendered. Towards the end of the war, in August 1918, Wakefield was transferred to the 2nd Division, No. 4 Field Ambulance, where he repatriated German prisoners until his transfer back to Canada in May 1919. He was demobilised afterwards. After the war, Wakefield became a surgeon to the Canadian Pacific Railway.

== 1922 British Mount Everest expedition ==
Arthur Wakefield joined the second expedition to make the first ascent of the world's highest mountain led by Brigadier-General The Honourable Charles Granville Bruce. While the expedition's official medical officer was Tom Longstaff, Arthur Wakefield was the more experienced of the two men and carried out most of the medical duties after Longstaff fell ill with respiratory problems. This expedition included George Mallory, Henry Morshead, Geoffrey Bruce, and Howard Somervell. Wakefield reached the North Col to attend to his fellow climbers, who achieved a height record in mountaineering. Wakefield's diary from the 1922 Everest expedition is held by his family.

This expedition included George Mallory, Henry Morshead, Geoffrey Bruce, and Howard Somervell. Wakefield reached the North Col to attend to his fellow climbers, who achieved a height record in mountaineering. On 5 February 1924, at the closing ceremony of the inaugural Winter Olympics, hosted in Chamonix, France, Pierre de Coubertin presented 13 gold medals for alpinism in recognition of the achievements of the 1922 British Mount Everest expedition members. The medals were accepted by Lt Col Edward Strutt, deputy leader of the expedition. Wakefield later served as President of the Fell & Rock Climbing Club from 1923–25 and became the Club's first life member.

In 2012, mountaineer Kenton Cool took Wakefield's medal to the summit of Mount Everest, fulfilling a pledge originally made by Strutt.

== Decorations ==
- Queen's South Africa Medal with four clasps
- The 1914-15 Star
- The British War Medal
- Victory Medal (United Kingdom)
