= George Mallory =

English mountaineer (1886–1924)

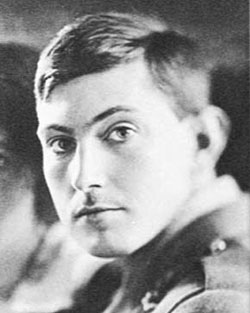
- George Mallory, c. 1916
- Born: George Herbert Leigh Mallory; 18 June 1886; Mobberley, Cheshire, England
- Died: 8 or 9 June 1924 (aged 37); North Face (Everest), Tibet
- Cause of death: Mountaineering accident
- Body discovered: 1 May 1999
- Education: Magdalene College, Cambridge
- Occupations: Teacher; lecturer; rock climber; mountaineer
- Spouse: Christiana Ruth Turner (m. 1914)
- Children: 3
- Military career
- Allegiance: United Kingdom
- Branch: British Army
- Service years: 1915–1918
- Rank: Lieutenant
- Conflicts: First World War

Olympic medal record

Men's Alpinism

Representing United Kingdom

Olympic Games
Gold medal – first place	1924 Chamonix	Everest expedition

George Herbert Leigh-Mallory (18 June 1886 – 8 or 9 June 1924) was an English mountaineer who participated in the first three British Mount Everest expeditions from the early to mid-1920s. He and his climbing partner Andrew "Sandy" Irvine were last seen ascending near Everest's summit during the 1924 expedition, prompting speculation as to whether they reached it before they died.

Born in Cheshire, England, Mallory became a student at Winchester College, where a teacher recruited him for an excursion in the Alps, and he developed a strong natural climbing ability. After graduating from Magdalene College, Cambridge, where he became friends with prominent intellectuals, he taught at Charterhouse School while honing his climbing skills in the Alps and the English Lake District. He pioneered new routes and became a respected figure in the British climbing community.

His service in the First World War interrupted his climbing, but he returned with vigour after the war. Mallory's most notable contributions to mountaineering were his expeditions to Everest. Famously, when asked by a reporter why he wanted to climb Everest, Mallory purportedly replied, "Because it's there." In 1921, he participated in the first British Mount Everest reconnaissance expedition, which established the North Col-North Ridge as a viable route to the summit. In 1922, he took part in a second expedition to attempt the first ascent of Everest, in which his team achieved a world altitude record of 27,300 ft (8,321 m) using supplemental oxygen. They were awarded Olympic gold medals for alpinism.

During the 1924 expedition, Mallory and Irvine disappeared on Everest's Northeast Ridge. They were last seen at 800 vertical feet (240 metres) from the summit. Mallory's body, along with personal effects, was found in 1999 by the Mallory and Irvine Research Expedition at 26,760 feet (8,160 metres), some 688 vertical metres below the summit. The discovery, however, provided no evidence that he had reached the summit.

== Early life and teaching career ==
=== Childhood ===
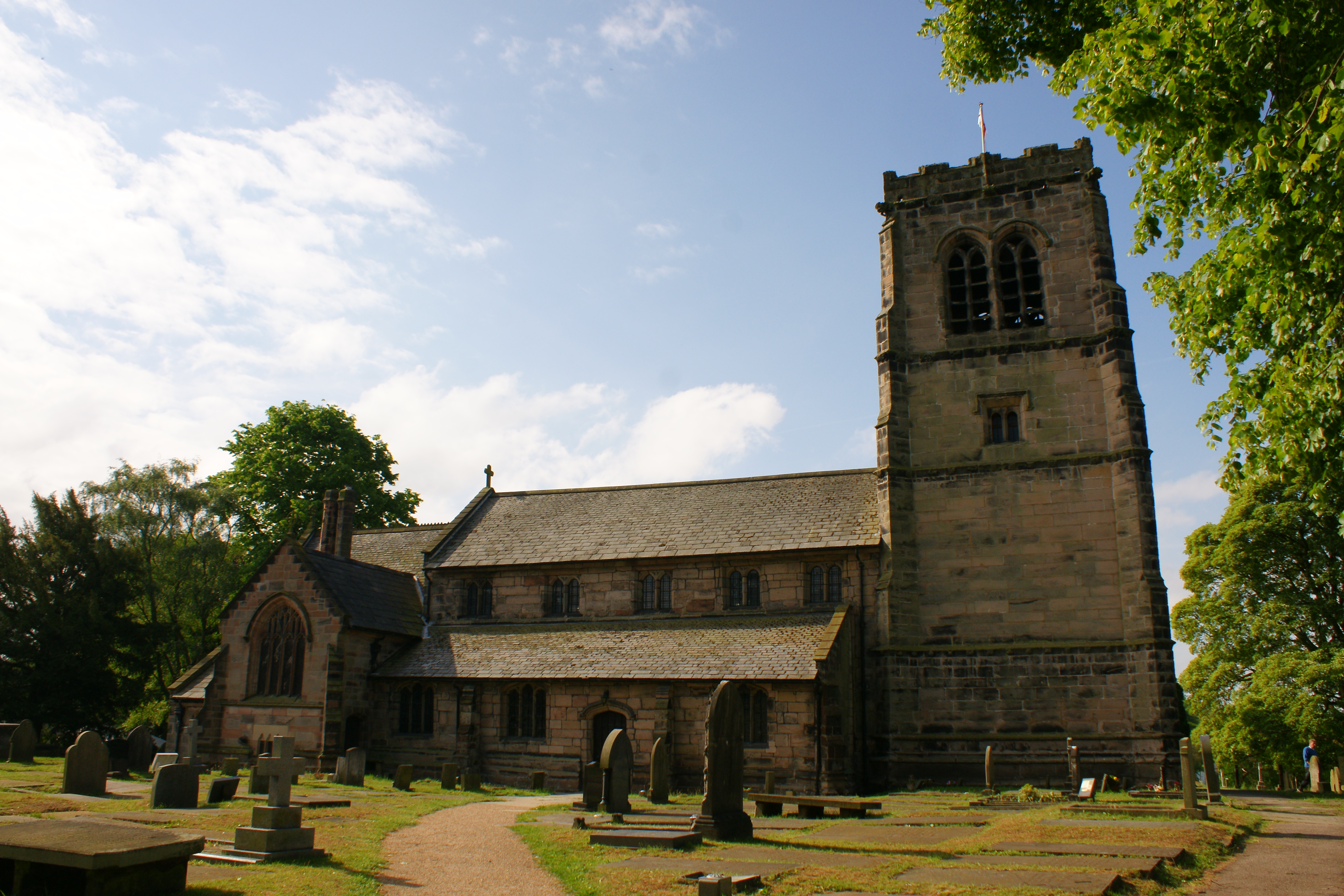
St Wilfrid's Church, Mobberley, Cheshire, which Mallory climbed aged 7

George Herbert Leigh Mallory was born at Newton Hall, Mobberley, Cheshire, on 18 June 1886. He was the first son and second child of Annie Beridge Leigh-Mallory and the Reverend Herbert Leigh Mallory, rector of the parish. Mallory had two sisters, Mary Henrietta and Annie Victoria (Avie), and a younger brother, Trafford, who was a Second World War Royal Air Force commander. (Note: In 1944, Sir Trafford Leigh-Mallory was Commander-in-Chief of the Allied Expeditionary Air Force. On 14 November 1944, Trafford and his wife Doris (née Sawyer) died when his aircraft hit a mountain in the French Alps, near Grenoble.) (Herbert Mallory legally changed his surname to Leigh-Mallory in 1914; Trafford followed suit, but George remained known as Mallory.) At the end of 1891, the Mallorys moved from Newton Hall to Hobcroft House, Mobberley. The family resided there until 1904, when they moved to Birkenhead, Cheshire. Mallory exhibited an early proclivity for climbing, and at age 7 he climbed the roof of his father's church, St Wilfrid's, in Mobberley. His sister Avie recalls, "He climbed everything that it was at all possible to climb." Included in his climbing exploits were the drainpipes of Hobcroft House and the walls that divided the farmers' fields.

==== 1896–1905: Glengorse and Winchester College ====
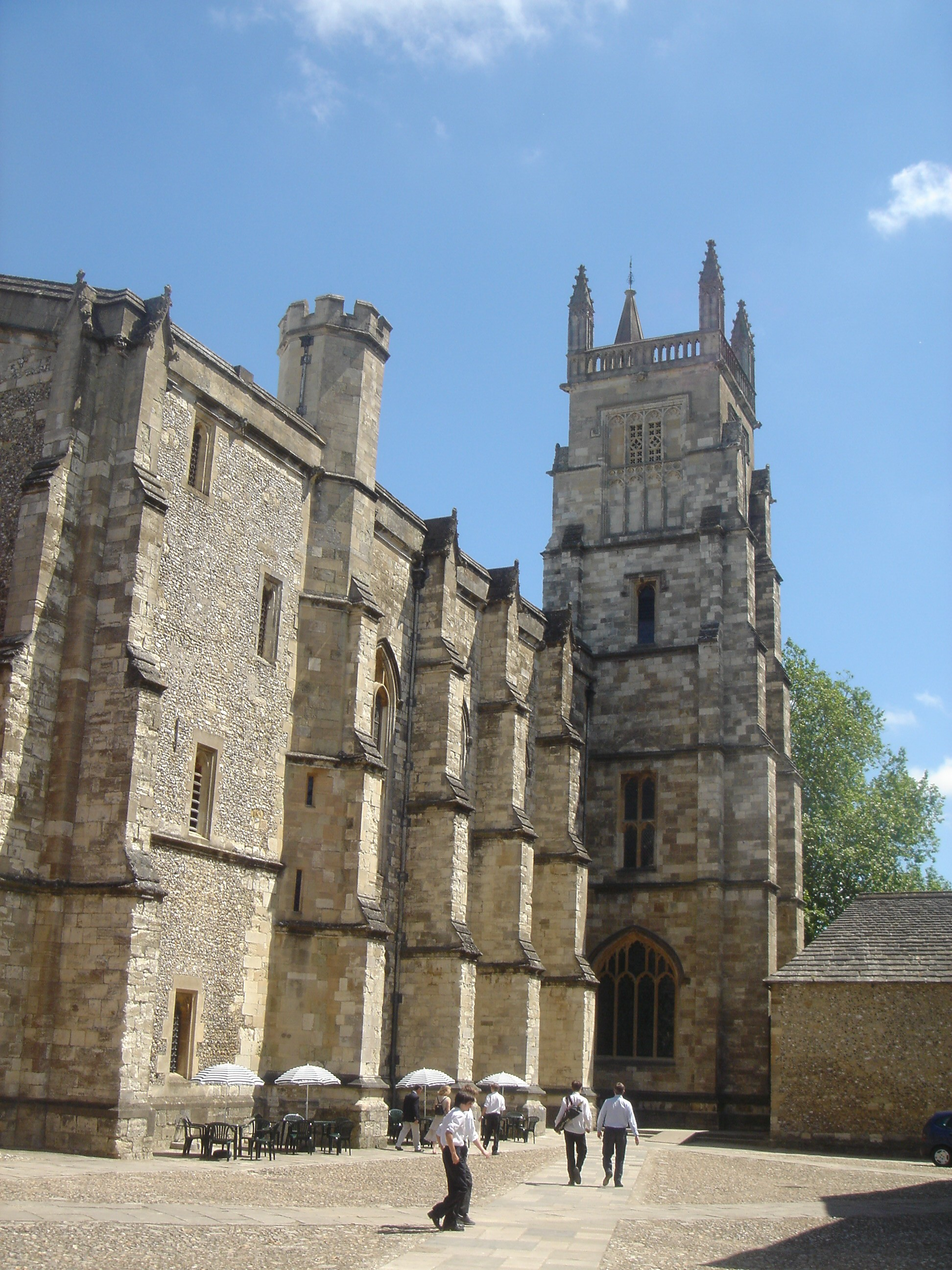
Winchester College Chapel (right) and scholars' College (left), where Mallory was a scholar 1900–1905

In 1896, Mallory was sent to Glengorse boarding school in Eastbourne on the south coast of England, after the abrupt closure of his first preparatory school in West Kirby, following the death of its headmaster. Mallory won a mathematics scholarship to Winchester College, an English public school, where he started in September 1900. At Winchester, he was proficient at sports, in addition to his academic ability. He became the best gymnast in the school, the only one capable of performing the giant swing on the horizontal bar. In July 1904, Mallory was a member of the Winchester team who won the Ashburton Shield for rifle shooting at Bisley.

In 1904, Irving was seeking new climbing companions after the accidental death of his regular climbing partner. R. L. G. Irving, the Master in College at Winchester, was a member of the Alpine Club and an accomplished mountaineer, and he recruited Mallory and fellow pupil and friend, Harry Gibson, (Note: Harry Olivier Sumner Gibson was a photographer who travelled to Zermatt in 1899 and Grindelwald in 1902, accompanied by his father.) for a trip to the Alps. It was there in early August 1904 that Mallory had his first experience with high-altitude mountaineering. In his final year at Winchester, Mallory studied history instead of mathematics. After sitting his exams, he was awarded a history scholarship, known as a sizarship, to Magdalene College, Cambridge.

=== 1905–09: Magdalene College, Cambridge ===
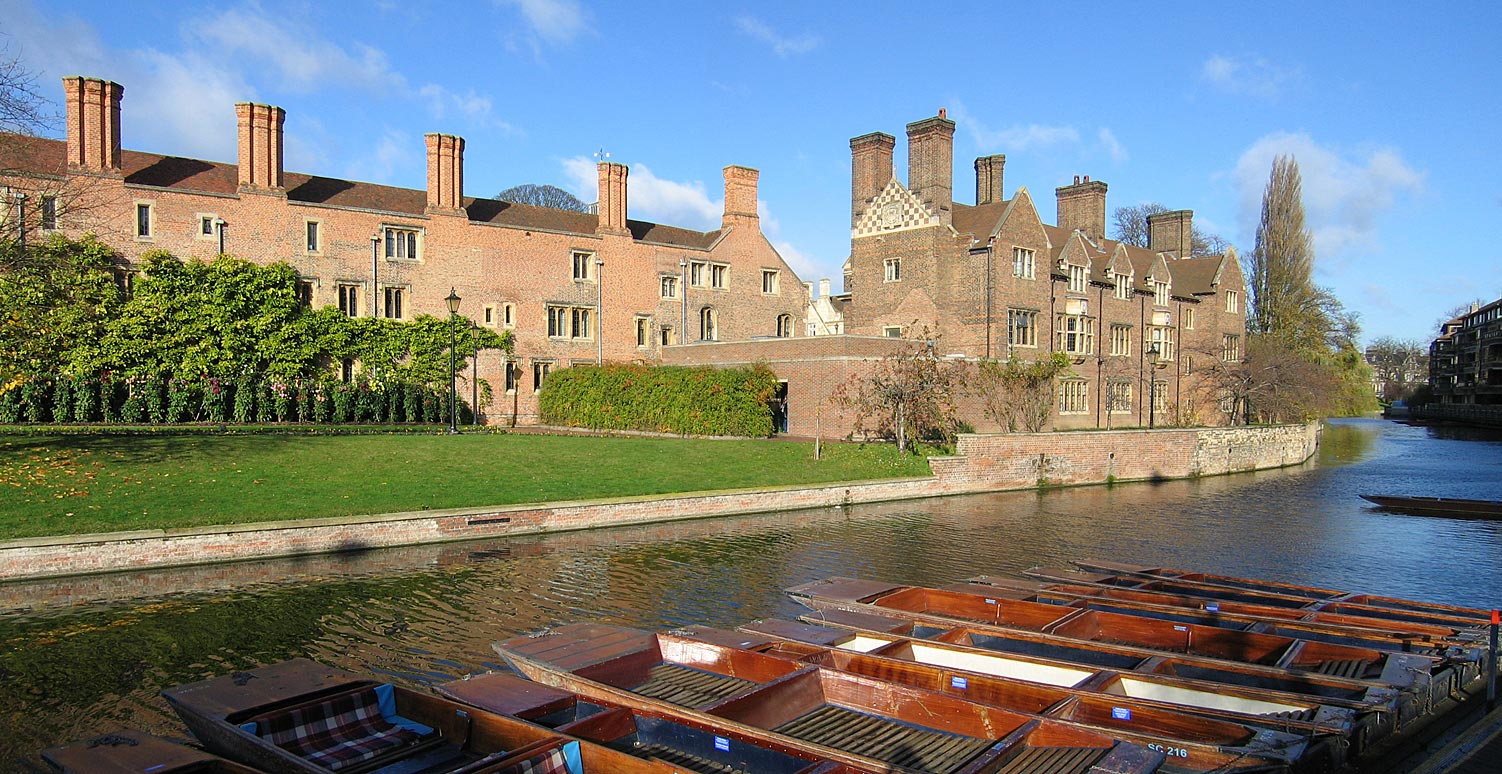
Magdalene College, Cambridge

"Mon dieu!—George Mallory!... My hand trembles, my heart palpitates, my whole being swoons... he's six foot high, with the body of an athlete by Praxiteles, and a face—oh incredible—the mystery of Botticelli, the refinement and delicacy of a Chinese print, the youth and piquancy of an unimaginable English boy."

— Lytton Strachey, writing to Clive and Vanessa Bell of his first meeting with Mallory. 21 May 1909.

In October 1905, Mallory entered Magdalene College to study history, where his tutor, A. C. Benson, became enamoured of him. On 6 February 1907 at Christ's College, Mallory dined with Charles Edward Sayle, under-librarian at Cambridge University Library. At Sayle's he met undergraduates with whom he established enduring friendships including painter Jacques Raverat, surgeon and author Geoffrey Keynes, poet Rupert Brooke, and psychoanalyst James Strachey. On 12 February 1909, Mallory met Geoffrey Winthrop Young and they developed a strong friendship. Through James Strachey and Geoffrey Keynes, Mallory got to know their brothers, Lytton Strachey and John Maynard Keynes, who were members of the Bloomsbury Group. Through the Stracheys, he befriended their cousin, painter Duncan Grant, (Note: In 1911, in Duncan Grant's studio at 38 Brunswick Square, London, Mallory posed for a series of nude photographs taken by Grant. In 1912, also at 38 Brunswick Square, Grant painted a portrait of Mallory, which the National Portrait Gallery acquired. Grant painted a second portrait of Mallory, which bears the date 1913.) a Bloomsbury member. His letters attest to the flirtatious nature of these friendships. Following his engagement in 1914, he wrote to one-time partner James Strachey: "It can hardly be a shock to you that I desert the ranks of the fashionable homosexualists (and yet I am still in part of that persuasion) unless you think I have turned monogamist. But you may be assured that this last catastrophe has not happened."

Mallory developed into an accomplished rower at Magdalene, and in October 1906, he was elected secretary of the Magdalene Boat Club and captain of boats from 1907 to 1908. Mallory joined the University Fabian Society, and acted as college secretary on the University Women's Suffrage Association committee. The Marlowe Society was established in 1907 and Mallory acted in its first production of Doctor Faustus.

Academically, in May 1907, Mallory sat Part I of the history tripos, achieving a third class. (In 1908, in Part II, he attained a second-class degree.) Mallory had to consider a future career and in 1907, he consulted deputy headmaster of Winchester, Howard Rendall, about becoming a teacher there, but Rendall bluntly dismissed his prospects. Mallory informed his tutor, A. C. Benson, that Randall "says that as I have nothing to teach and would probably teach it badly, there is not the least chance of ever getting to Winchester." Rendall suggested he go into the church and Mallory unenthusiastically considered following in his father's footsteps, perhaps engaging in "parish work of some kind... [But] I'm at variance with so many parsons that I meet. They're excessively good, most of them much better than I can ever hope to be, but their sense of goodness seems sometimes to displace their reason." Benson suggested Mallory return to Magdalene for a fourth year, where he could improve upon his degree. Mallory took his tutor's advice and settled into rooms at Pythagoras House, a short distance from the college.

In February 1909, Geoffrey Winthrop Young invited Mallory on a climbing trip to Wales. After Mallory's return to Magdalene, Young sent him an application to join the Climbers' Club, and in May 1909, Mallory was elected a member. The subject for the Members' Prize Essay in 1909 was James Boswell, biographer of Samuel Johnson. Mallory submitted an essay entitled Boswell the Biographer and it was awarded second place. (Benson encouraged him to submit his essay for publication and in 1912 it was published by Smith, Elder & Co.) Mallory completed his degree at Magdalene in July 1909.

=== 1909–10: Interim ===
In October 1909, the painter Simon Bussy, whose wife Dorothy was the sister of Lytton and James Strachey, invited Mallory to spend the winter with them at their villa in Roquebrune in the Alpes-Maritimes. Mallory, who had recently received a small family inheritance, accepted their offer and travelled to France in early November to stay with them. He stayed in Paris for a month to improve his French by reading, conversing, and attending the theatre, music halls and Sorbonne lectures.

In April 1910, Mallory returned to Cambridge, again considering his future career options. In May he took a temporary teaching post at the Royal Naval College, Dartmouth, which lasted two weeks. In July, Mallory received a letter from Gerald Henry Rendall (Note: Gerald Henry Rendall was a cousin of Howard Rendall, the deputy headmaster of Winchester College.), headmaster of Charterhouse, an English public school, offering him a job teaching Latin, mathematics, history, and French, which Mallory accepted.

=== 1910–14: Charterhouse School ===
"He was wasted at Charterhouse... the boys generally despised him as neither a disciplinarian nor interested in cricket or football. He tried to treat his classes in a friendly way, which puzzled and offended them because of the school tradition of concealed warfare between boys and masters."

— Robert Graves, one of Mallory's students at Charterhouse.

In September 1910, Mallory began teaching at Charterhouse as an assistant headmaster, but due to his youthful appearance he was often mistaken by parents for a student. He taught through enthusiasm and a friendly manner rather than by imposing authority. He followed the teaching styles of Irving and Benson, who sought to educate through mutual respect, getting to know pupils as individuals, and rejecting the strict discipline common in British schools at the time. Some of his colleagues, however, were hostile to his informal teaching methods, believing they eroded discipline. He recommended students read literature extensively, write essays on subjects such as hypocrisy, candour, and popularity, and engaged them in discussions of politics and literature. He also arranged visits to scenic landscapes and historic buildings.

Robert Graves, a student from 1909 to 1914, said Mallory was the best teacher and first genuine friend he ever had. (Note: On 23 January 1918, Mallory and his wife Ruth attended the wedding and reception of Graves and Nancy Nicholson. They were married at St James's Church, Piccadilly, with Mallory acting as best man.) In his autobiography, Good-Bye to All That, Graves wrote fondly of Mallory, who encouraged him in poetry and took him climbing in Snowdon. Irving and Young nominated Mallory for the Alpine Club, and in December 1910, he was elected a member. During the summer of 1913, Mallory collaborated with Graves and other students to produce a magazine called Green Chartreuse, intended to rival other school magazines, with its first publication on Old Carthusian Day, 5 July 1913. Mallory presented lectures on Italian painting in spring 1914, engaging students in a "rather philosophical" discussion about Botticelli, Michelangelo, and Raphael.

== Climbing in Europe ==
=== The Alps ===
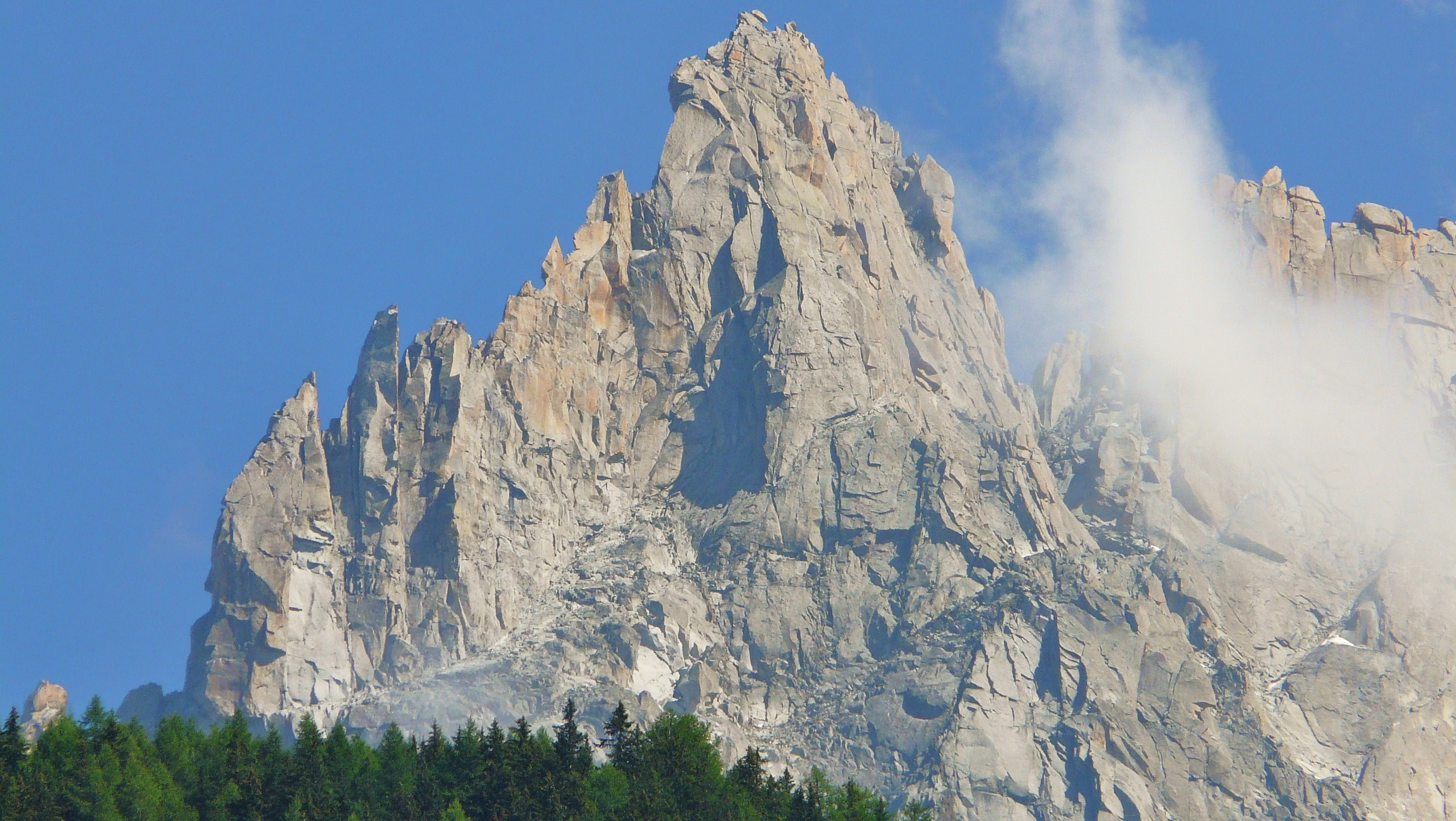
Mallory, with Harold Porter, established a new route on the Aiguille des Grands Charmoz in Haute-Savoie, France in 1919

Mallory made eight expeditions to the Alps and accomplished four first ascents. His first climb was on 5 August 1904, when he, Irving, and Gibson ascended Mont Vélan on the Swiss-Italian border. The team, however, was forced to retreat 600 ft (183 m) below the summit because Mallory and Gibson were suffering from altitude sickness. On 13 August, they reached the summit of Dufourspitze, the third-highest peak in Western Europe. On 26 August, Irving and Mallory summited Mont Blanc, at 15,800 ft (4,807.81 m), the highest mountain in Western Europe, marking Mallory's entry into high-altitude mountaineering.

In January 1905, Graham Irving established the Winchester Ice Club, and Mallory, Gibson, Harry Tyndale, and Guy Bullock became members. In August, the Ice Club travelled to the Alps. Mallory would not return for another four years, when he would accomplish a first ascent of the Southeast Ridge of Nesthorn with Young and Charles Robertson on 4 August 1909. Mallory wrote to his mother, "We were out 21 hours and were altogether pleased with ourselves," but he had also nearly fallen after missing a hold above an overhang. On 7 August, they crossed the mountain pass Grünhornlücke, followed by the Fiescher Glacier, and climbed to the summit via the Southeast Ridge of the highest mountain in the Bernese Alps, Finsteraarhorn, at 14,022 ft (4,274 m), graded approximately 5.8, using the Yosemite Decimal System (YDS). One of Mallory's closest friends and climbing companions, whom he met in Switzerland on this trip, was a woman named Cottie Sanders, who became a novelist using the pseudonym of Ann Bridge. Their relationship was unclear. Sanders was either a "climbing friend" or "casual sweetheart." After Mallory died, Cottie wrote a memoir of him, which remains unpublished but provided much of the material used by later biographers.

At the beginning of August 1911, Mallory returned to the Alps with Irving and Tyndale. On 9 August, they reached the summit of Herbétet, by way of a first ascent of its Western Ridge. On 18 August, Irving, Mallory, and Tyndale reached the summit of Mont Maudit, via the third ascent of its Southeast Ridge, and Mont Blanc. In 1917, Mallory rewrote an impassioned account about the Maudit ascent. It was published in the Alpine Journal of 1918 and contained the question, "Have we vanquished an enemy? None but ourselves."

In August 1912, Mallory undertook his sixth expedition to the Alps, along with Harold Porter and Hugh Pope. (Note: Hugh Pope (1889–1912) died in a mountaineering accident while climbing solo on Pic du Midi d'Ossau in the Pyrenees.) On 17 August, they established a new line on the West Face of Dent Blanche, graded 5.6–5.7. On 2 August 1919, Mallory and Porter set out from Montenvers and ascended the Mer de Glace up to the Glacier de Trélaporte. From there they took a new route to the summit of Aiguille des Grands Charmoz, likely graded 5.7. Three days later, they climbed a new route to the summit of Aiguille du Midi, at 12,605 ft (3,842 m). This route, rectified by the climber Jean-Louis Urquizar in 1971, is now known as Rectified Mallory-Porter, totalling 5,020 ft (1,530 m) in elevation gain and graded approximately 5.8–5.9.

=== Scotland ===
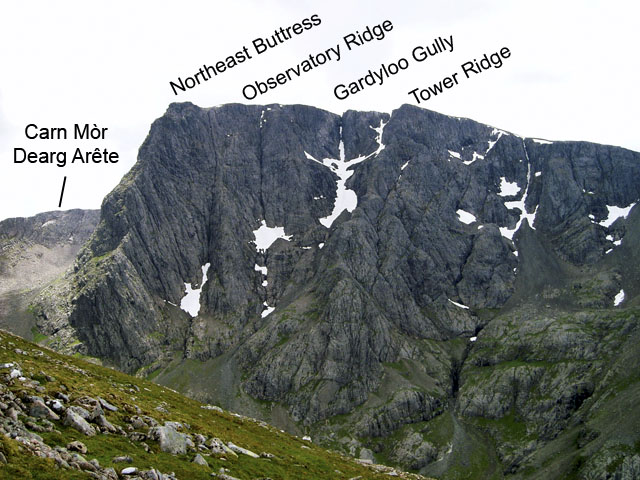
North Face of Ben Nevis

On 6 April 1906, Mallory, Irving, and Leach reached the summit of Ben Nevis (Note: With an elevation of 4,400 ft (1,345 m), the highest mountain in the British Isles.) in snowy conditions via Observatory Gully and Tower Gully on the northeast face. The following day, the trio ascended Stob Bàn, following the corniced main arête to the summit. On 9 April, they reached the summit of Càrn Mòr Dearg, before making a second successful ascent of Ben Nevis on the same day via North Trident Buttress. On 10 April, they successfully scaled a feature on Ben Nevis that they named East Zmutt Ridge after Zmutt Ridge on the Matterhorn, likely graded YDS 5.5–5.6. On 12 April, Mallory, Irving, and Leach made a successful snow-and-ice ascent of Ben Nevis via the North-East Buttress. Their achievement was the second recorded winter ascent of this route, after the first in 1896.

On 28 July 1918, Mallory, David Randall Pye, and Leslie Garnet Shadbolt, climbing together, made a new route on the North Face of Sgùrr a' Mhadaidh on the Isle of Skye, Scotland, graded 5.5–5.6. On 31 July, the trio with Mallory leading established another new route on the Western Buttress of the crag, Sron na Ciche, located in the Cuillin mountains; a route now known as Mallory's Slab and Groove, and graded about 5.5.

=== Wales ===
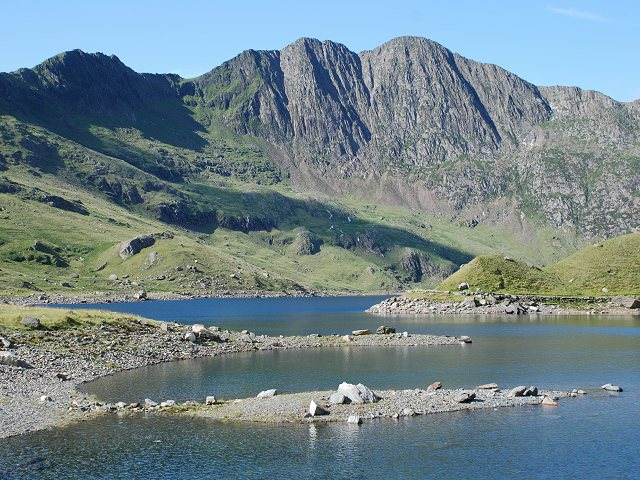
Mallory, climbing solo, established the first ascent of The Slab Climb on the East Buttress of Y Lliwedd

On 14 September 1907, Mallory accomplished his first two climbs in Wales: North Gully and North Buttress on Tryfan. On 18 September, Mallory, Keynes, and Wilson climbed Terminal Arête, on Lliwedd's East Buttress, and inadvertently dislodged a large rock when finishing their climb. Much to their dismay, the rock almost hit James Thomson and partner E.S. Reynolds as they climbed below on a new route, which they aptly named Avalanche Route.

On Craig yr Ysfa, the trio climbed two routes: Great Gully, at 732 ft (223 m), and Amphitheatre Buttress, at 961 ft (293 m), both graded about 5.5. Mallory returned to Snowdonia in August 1908, accompanied by his brother, Trafford. Mallory, climbing solo, established the first ascent of The Slab Climb on the East Buttress of Lliwedd, now known as Mallory's Slab, at 220 ft (67 m), and graded 5.5. The ascent of The Slab Climb occurred due to Mallory scaling it to retrieve his pipe, which he had left behind on a ledge known as Bowling Green. In April 1909, Mallory and Geoffrey Winthrop Young journeyed to Pen-y-Pass. On the cliffs of Craig yr Ysfa, Mallory and Young established three new ascents and climbed The Slab Climb (Mallory's Slab) on the East Buttress of Lliwedd, which Young described as "The hardest rocks I have done."

In September 1911, Mallory and his sister Mary were joined by Harold Porter, Mallory's climbing partner, and stayed at the Snowdon Ranger Inn on the shore of Llyn Cwellyn. Mallory and Porter pioneered new routes that elevated Mallory to the pinnacle of British climbing. On Y Garn, with Porter leading Mallory on the crux, they ascended a new route, now known as Mallory's Ridge, at 394 ft (120 m), graded 5.9–5.10a. This route defeated James Thomson in 1910, who abandoned it on the most challenging pitch, a sixty-foot segment of vertical rock.

=== England ===
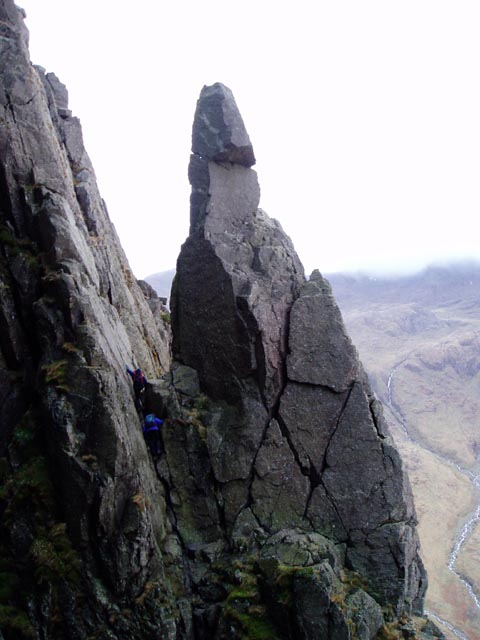
Napes Needle on Great Gable

Mallory's first rock climbing experience in England took place during a nine-day excursion to the Lake District in September 1908 with Geoffrey Keynes, Harry Gibson, and Harold Porter. Their initial climb was Kern Knotts Crack on Great Gable, which is graded 5.5. The following day they climbed Napes Needle, a rock pinnacle on Great Gable, at 56 ft (17 m), graded approximately 5.5. Also on Great Gable, they climbed Eagle's Nest Ridge Direct, graded approximately 5.8. They accomplished a successful ascent of North Climb on Pillar Rock, graded YDS 5.6.

On 21 September 1908, they pioneered two new routes on the Ennerdale face of Great Gable: Mallory's Left-Hand Route, at 98 ft (30 m), graded YDS 5.5, and Mallory's Right-Hand Route, at 120 ft (37 m), graded about 5.8. In August 1913, Mallory and Geoffrey Winthrop Young achieved a new route, Pinnacle Traverse, at 200 ft (60 m), graded 5.4, on the crag, Carn Lés Boel, in Cornwall. On 7 September 1913, Mallory and Alan Goodfellow, a Charterhouse student, created Mallory's Variation, a new route on Abbey Buttress, Great Gable, where Mallory finished the route by ascending a twenty-foot slab on tenuous grips, rather than exiting to the right. On 8 September, with Mallory leading Goodfellow, the pair established another new route, this time on the West Face of Low Man, Pillar Rock, at 210 ft (65 m), and graded 5.9–5.10a, which they named North-West by West and now known as Mallory's Route. (For comparison, climbers have rated Everest's Second Step at about 5.9.)

== Marriage and the First World War ==
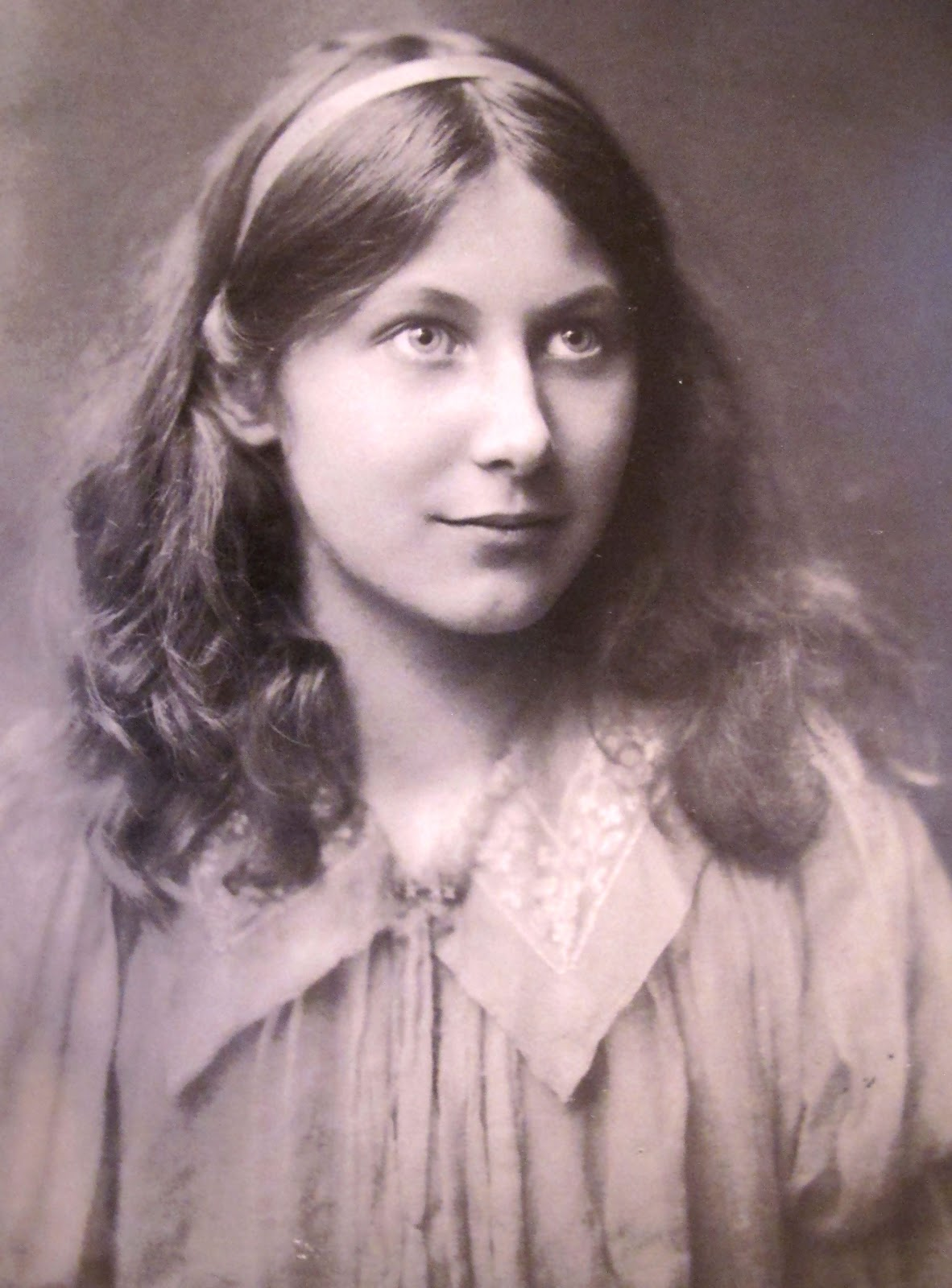
Christiana Ruth Leigh-Mallory (née Turner)

Christiana Ruth Turner was a daughter of architect Hugh Thackeray Turner and embroiderer Mary Elizabeth Turner. (Note: She died after developing pneumonia when Ruth was fifteen.) Mallory and the Turner family developed a close friendship and he regularly visited their dwelling at Westbrook. In April 1914, Mallory joined Thackeray and his daughters on a holiday in Venice, where Mallory and Ruth fell in love. On 1 May 1914, at Westbrook, Mallory and Ruth became engaged. Thackeray purchased a six-bedroom house for them, named The Holt, in Godalming, Surrey. On 29 July 1914, six days before Britain entered the First World War, Mallory and Ruth were married in Godalming, (Note: In 1939, Ruth married her longstanding family friend, William Arnold-Forster, to whom Mallory had first disclosed his love for Ruth. In 1942, aged 50, Ruth died of cancer.) with Mallory's father performing the ceremony and Geoffrey Winthrop Young acting as best man. Mallory and Ruth had two daughters and a son: Frances Clare (1915–2001), Beridge Ruth, known as "Berry" (1917–1953), and John (1920–2011).

Mallory enlisted in the war effort and started artillery training at Weymouth Camp in January 1916. Frank Fletcher, headmaster of Charterhouse, had initially challenged Mallory's inquiries about enlisting and asked the government about policies regarding schoolmasters enlisting. Mallory received additional training at the School of Siege Artillery at Lydd Camp. He arrived in France in May 1916 and fought at the Battle of the Somme in the 40th Siege Battery. Later that year, he was granted leave, spending ten days at Westbrook House with Ruth and daughter Clare before returning to France on Boxing Day.

He was reassigned as an orderly officer, serving as a colonel's assistant at the 30th Heavy Artillery Group headquarters, three miles behind the front line, for the first weeks of 1917. At the beginning of February 1917, the command recommended Mallory for a staff lieutenancy, but he rejected it and was instead assigned a liaison officer position to a French unit. At the end of March, he applied to rejoin the 40th Siege Battery, which had moved to a new location. On 7 April, during the prelude to the Battle of Arras, he was back at the front with the 40th Siege Battery in an exposed observation post, directing artillery fire.

"The trenches were in a filthy state, owing to a more or less futile attack made by our men the night before. I don't object to corpses so long as they are fresh. I soon found that I could reason thus with them... But this is an accepted fact that men are killed... your jaw hangs and your flesh changes colour and blood oozes from your wounds. With the wounded it is different. It always distresses me to see them."

— Mallory, in a letter to his wife, Ruth. 15 August 1916.

In September Mallory was sent, under new orders, to Avington Park Camp near Winchester, and was transferred from the Siege Battery to a Heavy Battery. Mallory trained at the camp with the Royal Artillery's new generation of 60-pounder heavy guns.

In October 1917, Mallory was promoted lieutenant and commenced a training course for newly promoted officers at Avington Park Camp. On 23 September 1918, Mallory was reassigned to the 515th Siege Battery, stationed between Arras and the French coast. On the evening of 11 November, at the officers' club in Cambrai, Mallory celebrated peace with his brother Trafford. (Note: Four in every ten undergraduates with whom Mallory had been at Magdalene, died in battle during the First World War.) Due to the British requirement to demobilise more than a million men and a lack of ships, Mallory did not return to England until January 1919. (Note: On 21 February 1920, Mallory resigned his commission in the Royal Garrison Artillery, retaining the rank of lieutenant.)

== The lure of Everest ==
Following his return from France, Mallory and his family re-established themselves in their previous residence, The Holt in Godalming, Surrey. At the end of January 1919, Mallory resumed his teaching position at Charterhouse, where he taught English and history. Mallory felt dissatisfied as a schoolmaster, devoting more attention to mountaineering issues, the direction of international politics, and the fundamental objectives of education, and pondering how he could find more time for writing.

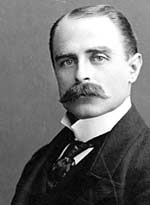
Sir Francis Younghusband

In January 1921, representatives of the Royal Geographical Society and the Alpine Club jointly established the Mount Everest Committee to organise and finance an expedition to Mount Everest. The committee consisted of four RGS members and four Alpine Club members. From the RGS were Sir Francis Younghusband, Arthur Robert Hinks, Edward Lygon Somers-Cocks, and Colonel Evan Maclean Jack; and from the Alpine Club were Professor John Norman Collie, John Percy Farrar, Charles Francis Meade, and John Edward Caldwell Eaton. The committee's primary objective in 1921 was a thorough reconnaissance of the mountain and its approaches to determine the most viable route to the summit, and in 1922 to return for a second expedition, using this route for an attempt to reach the summit. On 23 January 1921, Mallory received a letter from John Percy Farrar, secretary of the Alpine Club, its former president and member of the nascent Mount Everest Committee. Farrar asked Mallory if he would be interested in participating in an expedition to Everest: "It appears an attempt on Everest will occur this summer. The party would depart in early April and return in October. Any ambitions?"

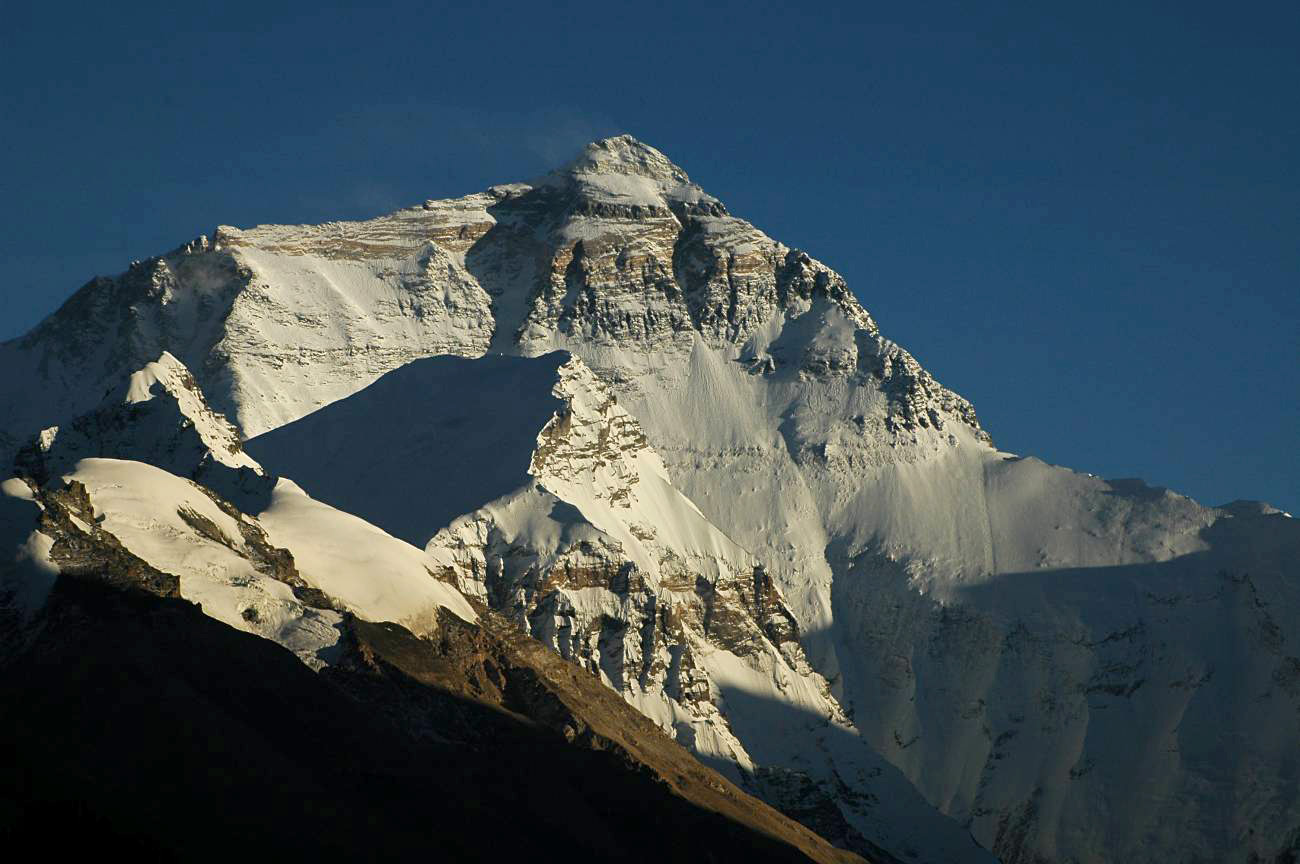
North Face of Mount Everest

Although grateful for the invitation, Mallory questioned the viability of the expedition and was reluctant to accept, also knowing that his participation would mean a lengthy separation from his wife and young children. Geoffrey Winthrop Young visited him at the Holt and upon learning of his hesitance, persuaded him and Ruth not to miss the opportunity, saying that not only would it be an incredible adventure, but it would also establish his reputation and enhance his prospects as an educator or writer. Ruth was convinced that Mallory should join the expedition and, acknowledging it was "the opportunity of a lifetime," he decided to participate. On 9 February 1921, in Mayfair, London, Mallory met with Sir Francis Younghusband, chairman of the Mount Everest Committee; John Percy Farrar, a committee member; and Harold Raeburn, the assigned mountaineering leader of the 1921 British Mount Everest reconnaissance expedition. At the meeting, Younghusband formally invited Mallory to join the expedition and was a bit puzzled by his less-than-enthusiastic response. But nonetheless Mallory resigned from his mastership at Charterhouse and on 8 April 1921 departed England on the SS Sardinia to join the expedition.

== Everest expeditions ==
=== 1921 British Mount Everest reconnaissance expedition ===
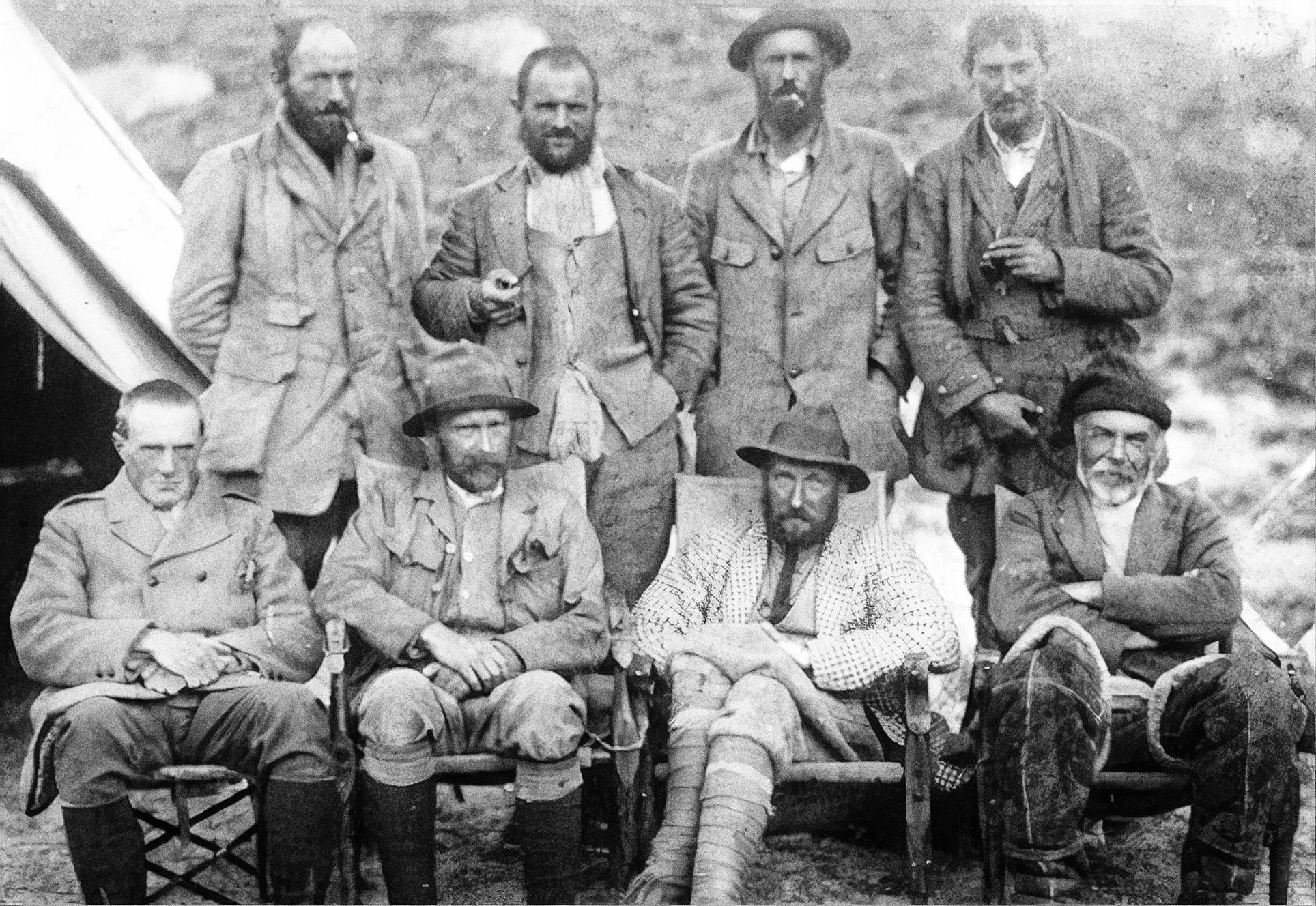
Eight members of the 1921 Everest expedition. Standing left to right are Guy Bullock, Henry Morshead, Oliver Wheeler, and George Mallory. Alexander Heron, Sandy Wollaston, Charles Howard-Bury, and Harold Raeburn are seated left to right. (Note: On 5 June 1921, during the march to the Mount Everest region, the ninth member of the 1921 Mount Everest expedition, Alexander Mitchell Kellas, who the Mount Everest Committee designated as a mountaineer, died from suspected heart failure near Kampa Dzong, Tibet.)

The objective of the first Everest expedition in 1921 was to reconnoiter the mountain and its approaches to determine the best route to the summit. Expedition surveyors Henry Morshead and Oliver Wheeler, with the assistance of Indian surveyors, produced the first accurate maps of the region. On 18 August, after a two-month survey of Everest's northern and eastern approaches, Mallory, Guy Bullock, Henry Morshead, and a porter left their camp at approximately 20,000 ft (6,096 m). From the western head of the Kharta Glacier, they ascended to the col of Lhakpa La, at 22,470 ft (6,849 m). The head of the East Rongbuk Glacier lay 1,200 ft (366 m) below Lhakpa La, and across the glacier rises a 1,000 ft (305 m) wall of snow and ice leading to Everest's North Col, at 23,030 ft (7,020 m). The team determined that the summit could be reached from there via the North Col-North Ridge-Northeast Ridge route.

On 23 September, Mallory, Bullock, Wheeler, and ten porters left their camp on Lhakpa La, descended to the East Rongbuk Glacier, and pitched camp at an elevation of 22,000 ft (6,706 m), 1 mile (1.6 km) from the beginning of the ascent to the North Col. On 24 September, the three expedition members and three porters crossed the East Rongbuk Glacier to the foot of the 1,000 ft (305 m) wall of snow and ice, and after an arduous climb reached the North Col. On the col and above, gale force winds were blowing from the northwest, making further progress impossible, and they were forced to return to their camp on the East Rongbuk Glacier. The next day, with the severe winds unabated, Wheeler suffering from frostbite, and the porters exhausted, Mallory decided to abandon the attempt.

On 29 October, Mallory departed from Bombay, India, on board SS Malwa. On 9 November, Younghusband wrote to Mallory asking him to join the second expedition in 1922, explaining that he did not want to wait until 1923 for fear of losing the favour and support of the Tibetans. Mallory wrote his sister Avie with his reservations about returning to Everest in 1922. His wife Ruth awaited him in Marseille, where they spent a holiday touring Provence. They discussed his participation in the 1922 expedition and again decided he should not miss the opportunity. On 25 November, they arrived home, and a few days afterwards Mallory met Hinks in London. Within a week he was on the list of mountaineers who had agreed to join the 1922 expedition.

=== Lectures, writing, and preparation for the 1922 expedition ===
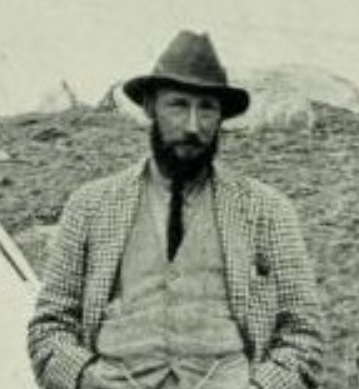
Charles Howard-Bury

On 20 December 1921 in the Queen's Hall, London, Mallory and Charles Howard-Bury delivered a narrative of the 1921 expedition at a combined meeting of the Royal Geographical Society and Alpine Club. In exchange for a quarter of the revenue earned, the Mount Everest Committee asked Mallory to lecture throughout Britain and contribute to the official expedition book, Mount Everest: The Reconnaissance, 1921. On 10 January 1922, Mallory gave his first lecture in the Queen's Hall, afterward giving 30 more at various locations in Britain. The financial results were lucrative, as his 25% share earned him £400, far exceeding his annual salary as a teacher. Before departing for the 1922 British Mount Everest expedition, Mallory completed his written contribution to Mount Everest: The Reconnaissance, 1921. The work, titled The Reconnaissance Of The Mountain, contained six chapters: The Northern Approach, The Northern Approach (continued), The Eastern Approach, The Assault, Weather And Conditions Of Snow and The Route To The Summit. He then turned his attention to assisting the Committee and reviewing equipment for the 1922 expedition.

=== 1922 British Mount Everest expedition ===
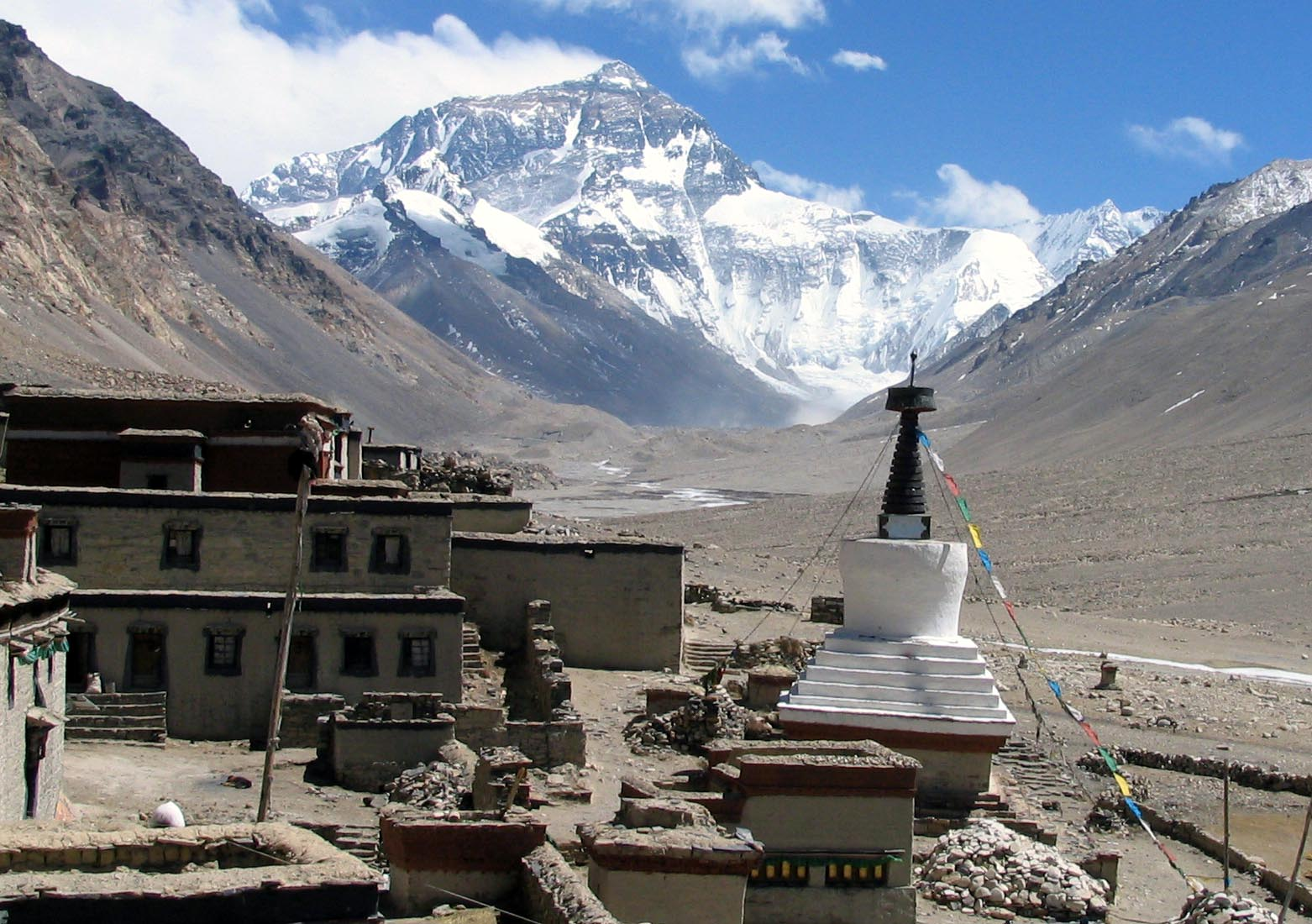
The Rongbuk Monastery, with Mount Everest in the background

Mallory returned to the Himalayas as a member of the 1922 British Everest expedition which was attempting to be the first to summit Everest. On 2 March 1922, Mallory, Howard Somervell, John Noel, Edward Strutt, George Finch, and Arthur Wakefield, crossed the English Channel, travelled by train to Marseille and, on 3 March, departed for Bombay on board the passenger liner Caledonia. During the voyage, Mallory attended Finch's bottled oxygen class, which helped him to overcome his uncertainty about its use. After docking in Bombay, they arrived in Darjeeling on 20 March, where they met up with the rest of the expedition. Members left in groups for the march to Phari. Mallory's group departed under expedition leader General Charles Granville Bruce, arriving in Phari on 6 April and joined the following day by the remainder of the expedition. They arrived at the Rongbuk Monastery on 30 April. On 1 May, the expedition pitched Base Camp at an altitude of 16,500 ft (5,029 m), 2.75 miles (4.43 km) below the junction of the Rongbuk Glacier and East Rongbuk Glacier.

==== First summit attempt, Mallory, Somervell, Norton, and Morshead ====
On 20 May, at 7:30 a.m., Mallory, Howard Somervell, Edward Norton, Henry Morshead, and four porters began their day at Camp IV, on the North Col at an elevation of 23,000 ft (7,010 m). After roping up at 8:00 a.m., the team began their ascent without supplemental oxygen. They planned to climb the North Ridge and establish Camp V at an altitude of 26,000 ft (7,925 m), and from there attempt to reach the summit. At 11:30 a.m., they attained an elevation of 25,000 ft (7,620 m), a gain of 2,000 ft (610 m) from the North Col, in 3 1/2 hours, a vertical climbing rate of 571 ft (174 m) per hour, including stops. Mallory estimated that from their present position, it would necessitate three hours to ascend 1,000 ft (305 m) and pitch Camp V. That would leave little time for the porters to return to Camp IV on the North Col before nightfall, and he was uncertain of finding a well-sheltered area from the strong winds on the lee-side of the North Ridge above them. Mallory decided to abandon their initial plan and erected Camp V at their current altitude of 25,000 ft (7,620 m). The four porters departed for the North Col camp at 3:00 p.m., and Mallory, Somervell, Norton, and Morshead spent the night at Camp V.

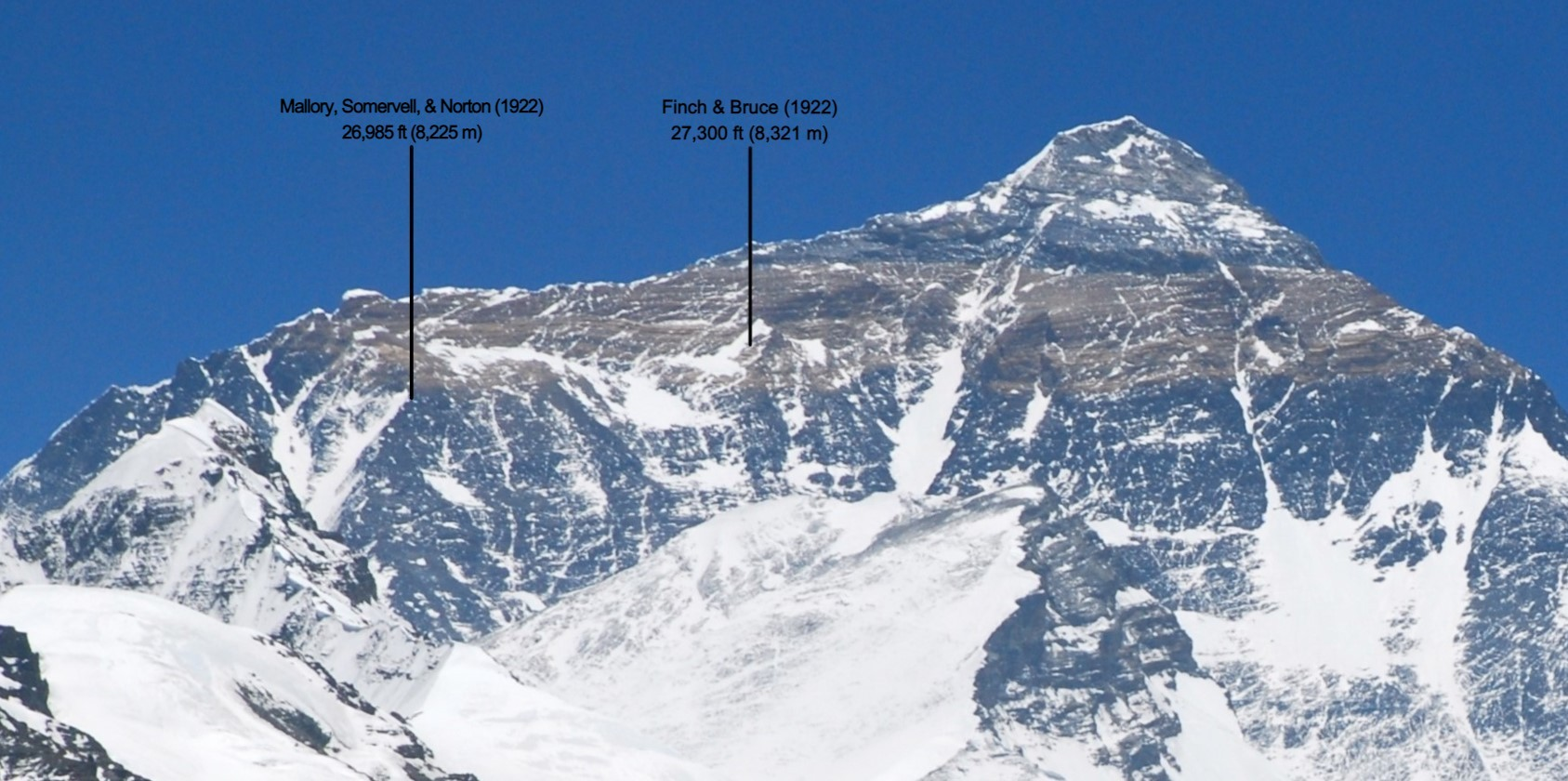
Everest's North Face, with illustrations of the maximum elevations attained by the 1922 expeditions' first and second summit attempts (Note: The two altitudes shown in this image are from the official expedition book, The Assault on Mount Everest: 1922. Mallory, Somervell, and Norton recorded their maximum elevation with an aneroid barometer as 26,800 ft (8,169 m), a height later rectified and confirmed as 26,980 ft (8,225 m) by a theodolite, leading to uncertainty about the actual altitude attained. When compared, an image taken during the expedition and the area's topography demonstrates that their high point was no lower than 27,460 ft (8,370 m) and possibly as high as 27,560 ft (8,400 m).) (Note: In the official 1924 expedition book, The Fight for Everest: 1924, as Norton, Somervell, and their three porters ascended from Camp V to where they established Camp VI at 26,700 ft (8,138 m), Norton states, "Sometime after midday, we recognised and passed the highest point that Mallory, Somervell, and I had reached in 1922 ... I remember a momentary uplift at the thought that we were actually going to camp higher than the highest point ever reached without oxygen ... About 1:30 p.m., it became evident that it would be impossible to urge the gallant Semchumbi much farther, so I selected a site for our tent." The 1924 expedition Camp VI was discovered by the 2001 Mallory and Irvine Research Expedition at an elevation of 26,700 ft (8,138 m). As stated in note 25, Mallory, Somervell, and Norton, on the first summit attempt of the 1922 expedition, recorded their high point with an aneroid barometer as 26,800 ft (8,169 m), a height later rectified and confirmed as 26,980 ft (8,225 m) by a theodolite. Jochen Hemmleb conducted photogrammetric surveys using the photo taken by Somervell on 21 May 1922 at the highest point they attained, and he concluded that he took it at an elevation of c. 26,600 ft (8,108 m) to 26,700 ft (8,138 m). Regarding Norton's above statement, they passed their high point of 1922, "Sometime after midday," which provides an unspecified amount of time between then and "About 1:30 p.m.," when they halted and established Camp VI at 26,700 ft (8,138 m). In conclusion, it is clear that Mallory, Somervell, and Norton's high point in 1922 was slightly lower than 26,700 ft (8,138 m).)

The next day at 8:00 a.m., the four mountaineers roped up and began their attempt to reach the summit from Camp V. But Morshead was suffering from frostbite and after a few steps declared he was unable to continue, and he stayed behind at Camp V. Adverse weather conditions prevented the climbers from beginning their ascent at 6:00 a.m. as planned, leaving them behind schedule. Other than possible mountaineering difficulties, their bid depended mainly on time and speed. Mallory's calculations estimated their vertical ascent rate at an unsatisfactory 400 ft (122 m) per hour, not including stops, which meant they would be climbing after nightfall, a risk they did not want to take. At 2:15 p.m., Mallory, Somervell, and Norton halted and lay against rocks on the North Ridge, where they remained for fifteen minutes and ate. Their aneroid barometer read 26,800 ft (8,169 m), a height later rectified and confirmed by a theodolite as 26,980 ft (8,225 m), a new world altitude record. They began their descent, and at 4:00 p.m. reached Camp V, where Morshead was waiting to join them for the return to Camp IV. The four climbers roped up and began their descent to 23,000 ft (7,010 m). As they descended, Morshead, who was third on the rope, slipped and dragged Somervell and Norton down a slope leading directly to the East Rongbuk Glacier, several thousand feet below. Mallory, who was leading, forced the pick of his ice axe into the snow and hitched the rope around the axe's adze to stop the slide, saving the lives of the three mountaineers. They reached Camp IV after nightfall, exhausted, hungry, frostbitten, and dehydrated.

==== Second summit attempt, Finch and Bruce ====
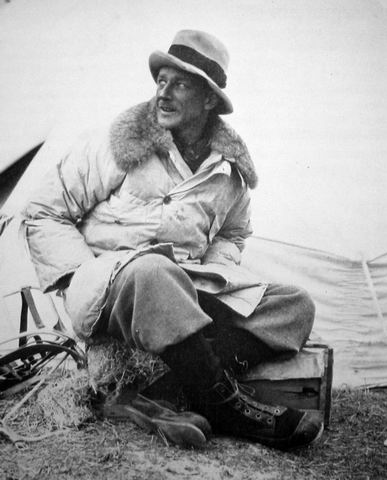
George Finch

On 27 May, George Finch, Geoffrey Bruce, and Tejbir Bura departed from Camp VI at 25,500 ft (7,772 m) on the North Ridge, for another attempt using supplemental oxygen. They took Bura, who was carrying two spare oxygen cylinders, as far as the Northeast Shoulder at 27,400 ft (8,352 m), where he descended as planned. Finch and Bruce loaded up the extra cylinders and dispensed with a climbing rope to advance faster. When they reached 27,000 ft (8,230 m), they changed course and climbed towards a point on the Northeast Ridge, halfway between the Northeast Shoulder and the summit. At midday their aneroid barometer registered an elevation of 27,300 ft (8,321 m), surpassing the previous attempt by 315 ft (96 m), a new world record. But weakened by hunger and exhaustion, they were unable to continue, and returned to Camp VI.

==== Third summit attempt, Mallory, Somervell, Crawford and the North Col avalanche ====
At the beginning of June, the expedition arranged a third attempt. The plan was to ascend to their old Camp V at 25,000 ft (7,620 m) without using supplemental oxygen and then, using a cylinder each, continue to an elevation of 26,000 ft (7,925 m) where they would establish the new Camp V. From there the team would use the supplemental oxygen to attempt to reach the summit. On 7 June at 8:00 a.m., Mallory, Somervell, Colin Crawford, and 14 porters left Camp III at 21,000 ft (6,401 m) and crossed the head of the East Rongbuk Glacier. The team reached the base of the snow and ice wall on the North Col at 10:00 a.m. and 15 minutes later Somervell, Mallory, Crawford, and one of the porters began the climb. At 1:30 p.m. the group halted about 600 ft (183 m) below Camp IV to allow the other porters to join them. At about 1:50 p.m., soon after the team continued the ascent, an avalanche began on an ice cliff above them and swept over the entire group. Somervell, Mallory, Crawford and the porter managed to dig out from beneath the snow and saw a group of four porters approximately 150 ft (46 m) below them gesturing down the slope. The avalanche had swept the other 9 porters into a crevasse. The remaining team members, later joined by expedition members John Noel and Arthur Wakefield, immediately began a search and rescue effort, finding eight of the nine porters, but only two had survived. A memorial cairn was erected at Camp III in honour of the seven who perished: Lhakpa, Narbu, Pasang, Pema, Sange, Temba, and Antarge. This ended the 1922 expedition and on 5 August, Mallory departed India and arrived in England in mid-August.

=== Announcement of a third expedition, lectures and writing ===
On 16 October 1922 at a combined meeting of the Royal Geographical Society and Alpine Club it was announced that the Tibetan government had formally authorised the third expedition to Everest. The Everest Committee resolved that the third expedition would commence in spring 1924. The committee was eager to generate money to cover some of the 1924 expedition's costs and discussed terms for a lecture programme. A large-scale lecture tour was organised, with Mallory and George Finch selected as the two speakers. On 20 October 1922, Mallory and Finch delivered their first public lectures on the 1922 expedition. During the winter, Mallory presented a round of talks throughout Britain and Ireland, with engagements in Aberdeen, Brighton and Dublin, receiving 30% of the proceeds. In addition to authoring Everest and Himalaya-related articles for periodicals and encyclopaedias to supplement his income, the committee requested that Mallory contribute to the official book of the 1922 expedition, The Assault on Mount Everest: 1922.

=== North America lecture tour and writing ===
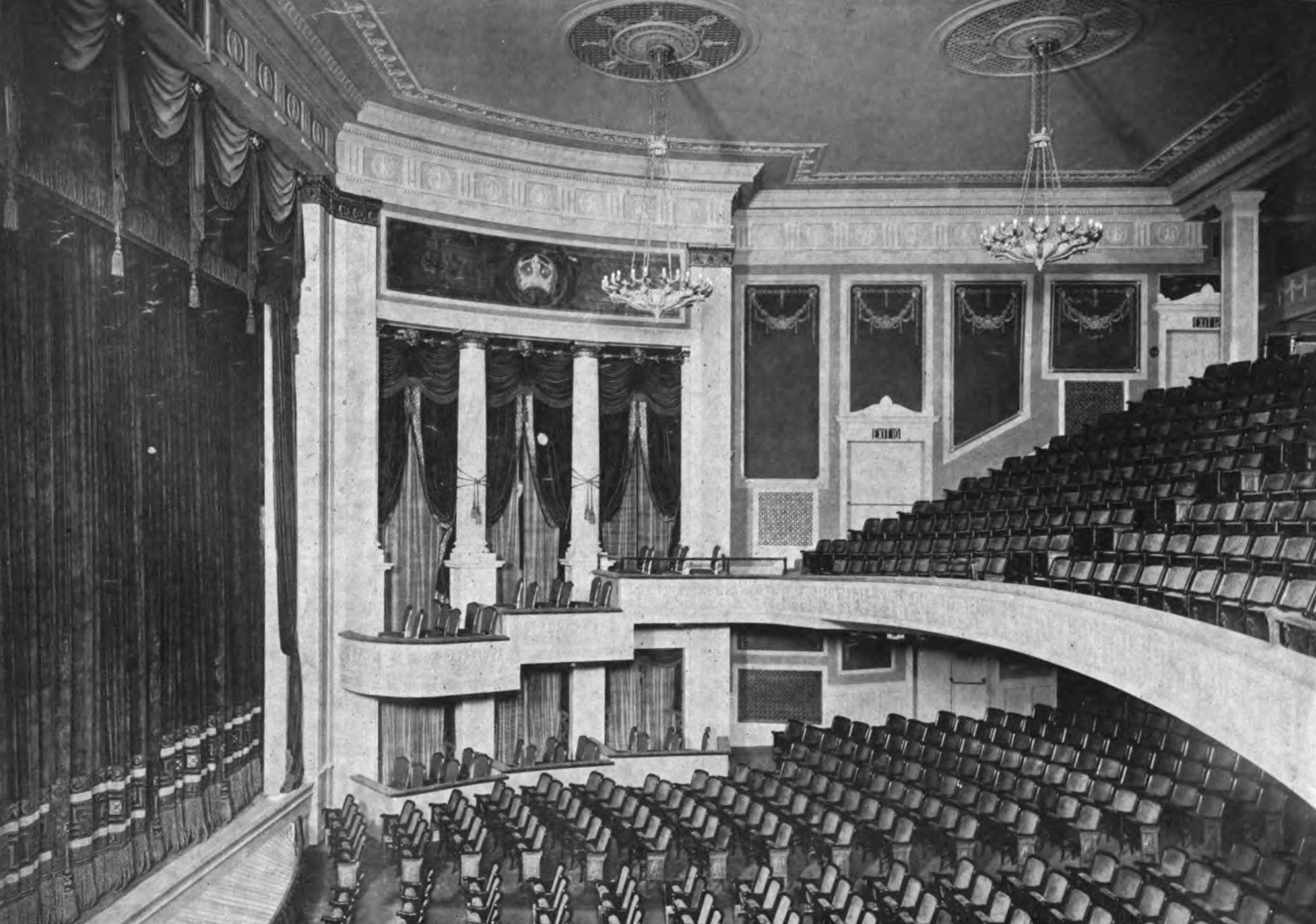
Broadhurst Theatre, New York

The Everest Committee arranged for Mallory to travel to North America on a three-month lecture tour. Mallory and Ruth concurred he should strive for steady employment when he returned. Mallory docked in New York on 17 January 1923. After meeting lecture agent Keedick, Mallory was dismayed he had arranged only a meagre number of lectures, and had to wait 9 days to deliver his first speech. He amended his lecture materials and wrote his finalised contribution to the 1922 expedition book, The Assault on Mount Everest: 1922. His first contribution was titled The First Attempt, consisting of chapters: The Problem, The Highest Camp, and The Highest Point, and his second had chapters: The Third Attempt and Conclusions. On 26 January, in Washington, D.C., Mallory delivered two lectures, which grossed $1000. His next engagement was in Philadelphia, where he delivered two lectures for a combined audience of approximately 3000, grossing $1500. After an evaluation by medical professionals at the NewYork-Presbyterian Hospital, they determined his lung capacity was twice that of the average person. On 4 February, Mallory gave a lecture at the Broadhurst Theatre, New York, in front of an audience of 550, filling only half the seating capacity. The next day, The New York Times ran a story under the headline, SAYS BRANDY AIDED MT EVEREST PARTY; A Swig 27,000 Feet Up 'Cheered Us All Up Wonderfully,' Mallory Tells Audience, which diverted its coverage of the tour into anti-prohibition propaganda. A Toronto appointment resulted in a cancellation, and a Montreal appearance grossed a meagre $48. In Boston, he delivered a lecture to the Appalachian Mountain Club, gave a speech in Cambridge, made a second visit to Philadelphia, where at the University Museum, he spoke to an audience of 1200, and delivered lectures in Toledo, Rochester, Iowa City, and Hanover, before a second engagement in Boston. Under the headline, CLIMBING MOUNT EVEREST IS WORK FOR SUPERMEN, The New York Times of 18 March quoted Mallory as having replied to the question, "Why did you want to climb Mount Everest?" with the retort, "Because it's there." The expression describes an existential desire to accomplish a physical and spiritual goal that mountaineers share. Questions have arisen over the quote's authenticity and whether Mallory said it. Some suggest it was an innovative paraphrase created by the reporter. The tour was a financial failure; Mallory regretted that he, Ruth, and the children would have to live on less than he had anticipated, because he had no immediate prospects for permanent employment. Mallory docked in Plymouth in early April.

=== Cambridge lecturer and Olympic medal ===
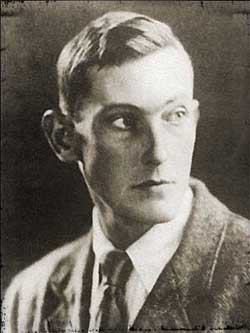
Mallory in the early 1920s

David Cranage, Secretary of the Board of Extra-Mural Studies at Cambridge University, and Arthur Robert Hinks of the Everest Committee travelled together on a train from London to Cambridge while Mallory was still in America, and discussed a vacancy that solved Mallory's situation. Cranage advertised a vacancy for a history lecturer to educate in towns and villages outside of Cambridge and assist organising other courses. They would conduct lectures in cooperation with the Workers' Educational Association, established to support working people who had missed the opportunity for education in favour of the privileged. Cranage apprised Hinks about the job and questioned whether he knew possible candidates, Hinks suggested Mallory. Hinks informed Mallory soon after he arrived back in England. Mallory applied and following a successful interview was appointed on 18 May. The occupation provided an annual income of £350, supplemented by lecture fees of £150 yearly. He found a suitable residence for the family at Herschel House on Herschel Road, Cambridge. Mallory immersed himself in his new employment with zeal, assisted organising the Golden Jubilee of Cambridge Local Lectures in July, and helped arrange summer schools during the Long Vacation. In the fall of 1923, he commenced lectures in Hunstanton on the emergence of democracy in the 17th century; in Raunds, tutorial classes in modern history; (Note: A three-year University Tutorial Class was the arrangement for Mallory in Raunds.) and conducted classes in Halstead. On 18 October, Hinks wrote to Cranage, requesting Mallory obtain leave to participate in the 1924 expedition. The Lecture Committee recommended six months' leave at half pay.

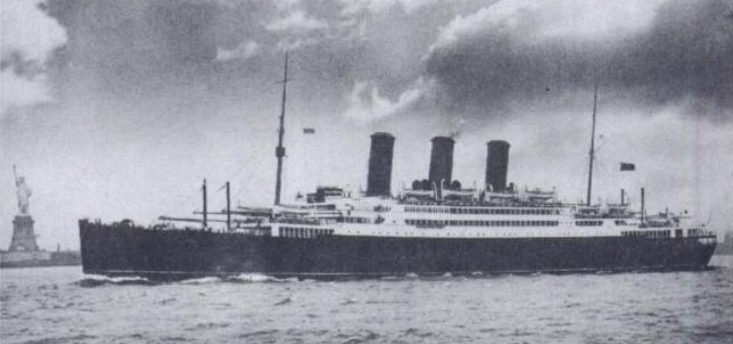
SS California in 1925, entering New York Harbor

On 6 November, after a medical examination by a physician recommended by the Everest Committee, Mallory was declared "fit in every respect," eliminating the last potential obstacle between him and participation in the expedition. On 5 February 1924, at the closing ceremony of the inaugural Winter Olympics in Chamonix, France, Pierre de Coubertin presented 13 gold medals, including for Mallory, for alpinism in recognition of the achievements of the 1922 Everest expedition members to Lt Col Edward Strutt, deputy expedition leader. (Note: An additional eight gold medals, after a request to the International Olympic Committee by expedition leader General Charles Granville Bruce, were awarded to other members of the 1922 expedition. One of the medalists was Nepalese Tejbir Bura, a mountaineer and NCO in the 2nd Battalion of the 6th Gurkha Rifles. On 27 May 1922, Bura, unable to ascend further, reached an altitude of 26,000 ft (7,925 m) on Everest, climbing with George Finch and Geoffrey Bruce. Later that day, Finch and Bruce attained a world altitude record of 27,300 ft (8,321 m) using supplemental oxygen. The seven porters who died in an avalanche on the North Col on 7 June 1922 were posthumously awarded the other seven medals. Their names were Lhakpa, Narbu, Pasang, Pema, Sange, Temba, and Antarge.)

=== 1924 British Mount Everest expedition ===
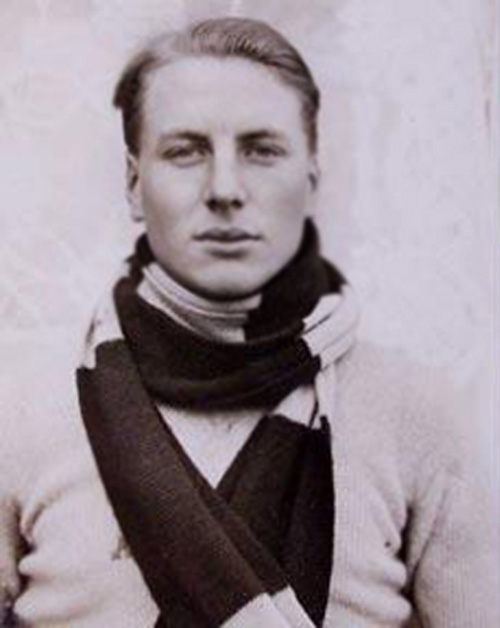
Andrew Irvine, Mallory's climbing partner

The expedition members included leader General Charles Bruce, Edward Norton as second-in-command and mountaineering leader; mountaineers Andrew Irvine, Howard Somervell, Geoffrey Bruce, Bentley Beetham, and John de Vars Hazard; mountaineer and oxygen officer Noel Odell; photographer and cinematographer John Noel; naturalist and medical officer Richard Hingston; and transportation officer Edward Shebbeare. On 29 February, Mallory and three other expedition members, Irvine, Beetham, and Hazard, departed from Liverpool on board SS California. During the voyage to India, Mallory read Maurois's Ariel, studied Hindustani, and worked through the logistics of supplies and aspects of the organisation for the expedition. Determined to remain physically healthy, he exercised regularly in the gymnasium, threw a medicine ball with Irvine and Beetham, and periodically ran ten laps around the deck. In mid-March, California arrived at her destination, berthing in Bombay. Mallory, Irvine, Beetham, and Hazard travelled to Darjeeling, where they rendezvoused with the other participants. On 25 March, the entire expedition departed Darjeeling for the march to Everest Base Camp. The trek of 350 miles (560 km) took them from Darjeeling to Kalimpong, Guatong, Jelep La, Yatung, Phari, Tang La, Donka La, Kampa Dzong, Tinki Dzong, Tinki La, Chiblung, Shekar Dzong, Chödzong, and Rongbuk, and they arrived at Base Camp on 29 April, at an altitude of 16,800 ft (5,120 m). On 9 April, General Bruce had collapsed due to recurrent malaria and had ongoing cardiovascular issues during the trek to Base Camp. Norton took charge, appointed Mallory as deputy and mountaineering leader, and Charles Bruce returned to India.

==== Mallory and Bruce's attempt ====
On 1 June, at 6:00 a.m., Mallory and Geoffrey Bruce, without supplemental oxygen, and eight porters commenced their ascent from Camp IV on the North Col at 23,000 ft (7,010 m). They planned to climb the North Ridge and establish Camp V at approximately 25,500 ft (7,772 m), where they would sleep overnight; the following day, they would ascend to about 27,200 ft (8,291 m), where they would pitch Camp VI, sleep overnight, and on 3 June, attempt to reach the summit without oxygen. The precise elevation for establishing Camps V and VI depended on the porters' abilities to carry heavy loads in the rarefied air and weather conditions. As the two climbers and eight porters ascended the North Ridge with an average gradient of 45 degrees, they were exposed to a penetrating northwest wind. At approximately 25,000 ft (7,620 m), four of the porters could not ascend any further after reaching the limits of their endurance. Mallory, Bruce, and the four remaining porters progressed to an elevation of 25,200 ft (7,681 m), where they established Camp V. Five porters descended to Camp IV, leaving three to shoulder loads the following day up to the location where the expedition intended to pitch Camp VI. Mallory, Bruce, and the three porters slept at Camp V that night, and on the next day, only one porter was able to proceed, and two declared themselves sick and physically unable to carry loads. Without enough porters to assist, the attempt was abandoned immediately, and the party returned to the North Col.

On 2 June Somervell and Norton began a second attempt. On 4 June Somervell and Norton left Camp VI and commenced their ascent to reach the summit. At midday, as they neared 28,000 ft (8,534 m), Somervell, who was suffering from an extremely sore throat and a severe cough, felt it impracticable to continue. Somervell sat on a ledge while Norton proceeded solo. At 1:00 p.m., suffering from temporary visual impairment due to oxygen deficiency, (Note: At approximately 27,500 ft (8,382 m), Norton started to experience difficulty with his vision. He was seeing double and thought it was a symptom of the onset of snow blindness, but Somervell assured him this was not the case. Later, Norton learned that oxygen deficiency was the cause. After 11:00 p.m. that same day, he was awakened by discomfort in both eyes caused by snow blindness, and the following morning, he was completely blind and remained in that condition for a further 60 hours.) exhausted from his efforts, and knowing that from his location and the current time, he stood no chance of reaching the summit and returning safely, Norton retreated from where he had attained a new world altitude record of 28,126.0 ft (8,572.8 m). At 9:30 p.m., Somervell and Norton reached Camp IV.

==== Mallory and Irvine's last climb ====
Dear Odell,

"We're awfully sorry to have left things in such a mess—our Unna Cooker rolled down the slope at the last moment. Be sure of getting back to IV to-morrow in time to evacuate by dark, as I hope to. In the tent I must have left a compass—for the Lord's sake rescue it: we are here without. To here on 90 atmospheres for the 2 days—we'll probably go on 2 cylinders—but it's a bloody load for climbing. Perfect weather for the job!"

— Yours ever, G. Mallory.

On 4 June at 2:10 p.m., Mallory and Irvine, using supplemental oxygen for the final half of their ascent, left Camp III at 21,000 ft (6,401 m) and reached Camp IV on the North Col at 23,000 ft (7,010 m) in 3 hours, at 5:10 p.m., including about 30 minutes at a dump choosing and testing oxygen cylinders. That night, Mallory shared a tent with Norton, who had just returned from his summit attempt with Somervell, and told Norton that if his summit bid with Somervell had failed, he had planned to make one further attempt with supplemental oxygen. Mallory returned to Camp III and with Bruce's assistance recruited enough porters for another attempt. He chose Irvine as his climbing partner because of the initiative and mechanical expertise he exhibited with the oxygen apparatus. On 6 June at 8:40 a.m., Mallory, Irvine, and eight porters set off from Camp IV in excellent weather for Camp V on the North Ridge at 25,200 ft (7,681 m). Both mountaineers shouldered modified oxygen apparatus, each carrying two cylinders apiece, and their eight porters, not using oxygen, took provisions, bedding, and extra cylinders. They progressed steadily and reached Camp V in good time. Shortly after 5:00 p.m., four of their porters arrived back at Camp IV with a note from the climbing party stating, "There is no wind here, and things look hopeful." The two climbers and the four remaining porters spent the night at Camp V. On 7 June, Mallory, Irvine, both using oxygen for part of their climb, and the four porters ascended to Camp VI at 26,700 ft (8,138 m) on the North Ridge. That same day, expedition member Noel Odell and his porter Nema, in support of Mallory and Irvine, climbed to Camp V. Soon after they reached Camp V, Mallory and Irvine's four remaining porters arrived from Camp VI, and gave Odell a note from Mallory.

Odell's porter, Nema, was suffering from altitude sickness, so that evening Odell sent him back down, along with the other four porters, to Camp IV. When they reached Camp IV, a porter known as Lakpa gave John Noel a second note from Mallory. Noel's filming location was above Camp III, on the ledge of a buttress at 22,000 ft (6,706 m) on the Eastern Ridge of Changtse, which he called "Eagle's Nest Point." From this vantage point, Noel had a clear view across the head of the East Rongbuk Glacier, the ice slope leading to the North Col, the Northeast Ridge, and the North Face. Lakpa told him that Mallory and Irvine were in good health, had reached Camp VI, and the weather was fine. Mallory's message reminded Noel of the locations and approximate time of where and when to look for them during their summit attempt as previously discussed and organised. (Mallory erroneously wrote 8:0 p.m.; he meant a.m.)

Dear Noel,

"We'll probably start early tomorrow (8th) in order to have clear weather. It won't be too early to start looking for us either crossing the rock band under the pyramid or going up skyline at 8.0 p.m."

— Yours ever, G. Mallory.

On 8 June at 8:00 a.m., after spending the night alone at Camp V, Odell, again supporting Mallory and Irvine, began his ascent to Camp VI and, on his way, intended to conduct a geological study. (As Odell ascended to Camp VI he found the first fossils on Everest in a limestone band at approximately 25,500 ft (7,772 m).) That same morning, Noel perched himself at "Eagle's Nest Point," where he directed the long lens of his motion picture camera towards the summit to film Mallory and Irvine. He had two assistant porters peering through a telescope in turns but they saw nothing. 8:00 a.m. came and went without sighting the mountaineers and by 10:00 a.m. clouds and mist had enshrouded their view of the entire summit ridge. When he reached an elevation of about 26,000 ft (7,925 m), Odell climbed a small crag and when he reached its top at 12:50 p.m., the air cleared to reveal the summit ridge and peak, where he saw Mallory and Irvine on a prominent rock step on the ridge.

"At 12:50, just after I had emerged in a state of jubilation at finding the first definite fossils on Everest, there was a sudden clearing of the atmosphere, and the entire summit ridge and final peak of Everest were unveiled. My eyes became fixed on one tiny black spot, silhouetted on a small snow crest beneath a rock step in the ridge, and the black spot moved. Another black spot became apparent and moved up the snow to join the other on the crest. The first then approached the crest rock step and shortly emerged at the top. The second did likewise. Then the whole fascinating vision vanished, enveloped in cloud once more. There was but one explanation. It was Mallory and his companion, moving, as I could see even at that great distance, with considerable alacrity ... The place on the ridge mentioned is a prominent rock step at a very short distance from the base of the final pyramid."

— Noel Odell, support climber and last man to see Mallory and Irvine alive, 8 June 1924. This version of Odell's sighting appeared in the Aberdeen Press and Journal on 5 July 1924.

The location of Odell's final sighting of Mallory and Irvine before they disappeared into the clouds was at the top of the Second Step, determined by expedition member John de Vars Hazard to be at an elevation of 28,230 ft (8,603.5 m). (Note: Odell was emphatically sure he saw moving figures, not geological objects, and after returning to England, individuals persuaded him that it must have been the First Step where he had last seen them. He later expressed uncertainty about whether it was the First or Second Step stating, "Owing to the small portion of the summit ridge uncovered, I could not be precisely certain at which of these two "Steps" they were, as in profile and from below they are very similar, but at the time I took it for the upper "Second Step." However, I am a little doubtful now whether the latter would not be hidden by the projecting nearer ground from my position below on the face." Odell also stated, "The "Second Rock Step" is seen prominently in photographs of the North Face from the Base Camp, where it appears a short distance from the base of the final pyramid down the snowy first part of the crest of the Northeast Arête.") At approximately 2:00 p.m., as Odell reached Camp VI at 26,700 ft (8,138 m), snow began to fall and the wind strengthened. Inside Mallory and Irvine's tent, he found spare clothes, food scraps, sleeping bags, oxygen cylinders, and parts of the oxygen apparatus. Outside he found parts of the oxygen apparatus and the duralumin carriers. They left no note stating when they had commenced their attempt or what might have transpired to create a delay. Odell departed from Camp VI, ascended about 200 ft (60 m) in the direction of the summit in visibility of no more than a few yards, and whistled and yodelled in an attempt to direct Mallory and Irvine towards Camp VI in case they happened to be within hearing distance. After no response, at approximately 4:00 p.m. he returned to Camp VI. The weather cleared and the entire North Face became bathed in sunlight. The upper crags became visible but there was no sign of Mallory or Irvine. Odell left Mallory's compass, which he had retrieved from Camp V, inside the tent at Camp VI and at about 4:30 p.m. descended to Camp IV.

On the morning of 9 June, Odell and Hazard searched Camps V and VI using binoculars but found no sign of either mountaineer. Odell and two porters left Camp IV and reached Camp V at 3:30 p.m., where they spent the night. The following morning, Odell sent his porters back to Camp IV, as they were unable to ascend to Camp VI. In a strong wind Odell climbed alone to Camp VI, reaching it at about 11:00 a.m. It was apparent that Mallory and Irvine had not returned, as everything was as he had left it two days previously. Odell discarded his oxygen apparatus and set off along the route the climbers would have taken, to search within the limited time available. After two hours with no sign of Mallory or Irvine, he resigned himself to the fact that the likelihood of finding them among the extensive crags and slabs was remote, and an extensive search towards the final pyramid would require a larger party. Odell returned to Camp VI and positioned two sleeping bags on a snow-patch in the shape of a "T" to indicate there was no trace of Mallory or Irvine. At 2:10 p.m., Hazard, 3,700 ft (1,128 m) below at Camp IV, saw the T-shaped signal and knew what it meant as he and Odell had drawn up a code of signals. At approximately 2:15 p.m., Hazard sent the signal for death--six blankets on the snow surface in the shape of a cross--to notify the watchers at Camp III. After being informed about the situation, expedition leader Norton ordered the signal to "Abandon hope and come down". After retrieving Mallory's compass and an oxygen apparatus, Odell descended to Camp IV.

On 8 June, the same day that Mallory and Irvine were last seen alive, Mallory's wife Ruth and their children were on holiday in Bacton, Norfolk. On 13 and 14 June, Howard Somervell and Bentley Beetham oversaw the carving and building of a memorial cairn at Base Camp in memory of those who perished in the 1921, 1922, and 1924 expeditions, with the inscription: In Memory Of Three Everest Expeditions; 1921, Kellas; 1922, Lhakpa, Narbu, Pasang, Pema, Sange, Temba, Antarge; 1924, Mallory, Irvine, Shamsher, Manbahadur. In London on 19 June, Arthur Robert Hinks received a coded telegram that read, "Mallory Irvine Nove Remainder Alcedo," sent from expedition leader Edward Norton. "Nove" meant death and "Alcedo" meant unharmed, so the message was that Mallory and Irvine had died but the rest of the expedition had survived. Later that day, Hinks sent a telegram to Ruth Mallory informing her of the tragedy and conveying the condolences of the Mount Everest Committee.

==== Message from the King and memorial service at St Paul's Cathedral ====
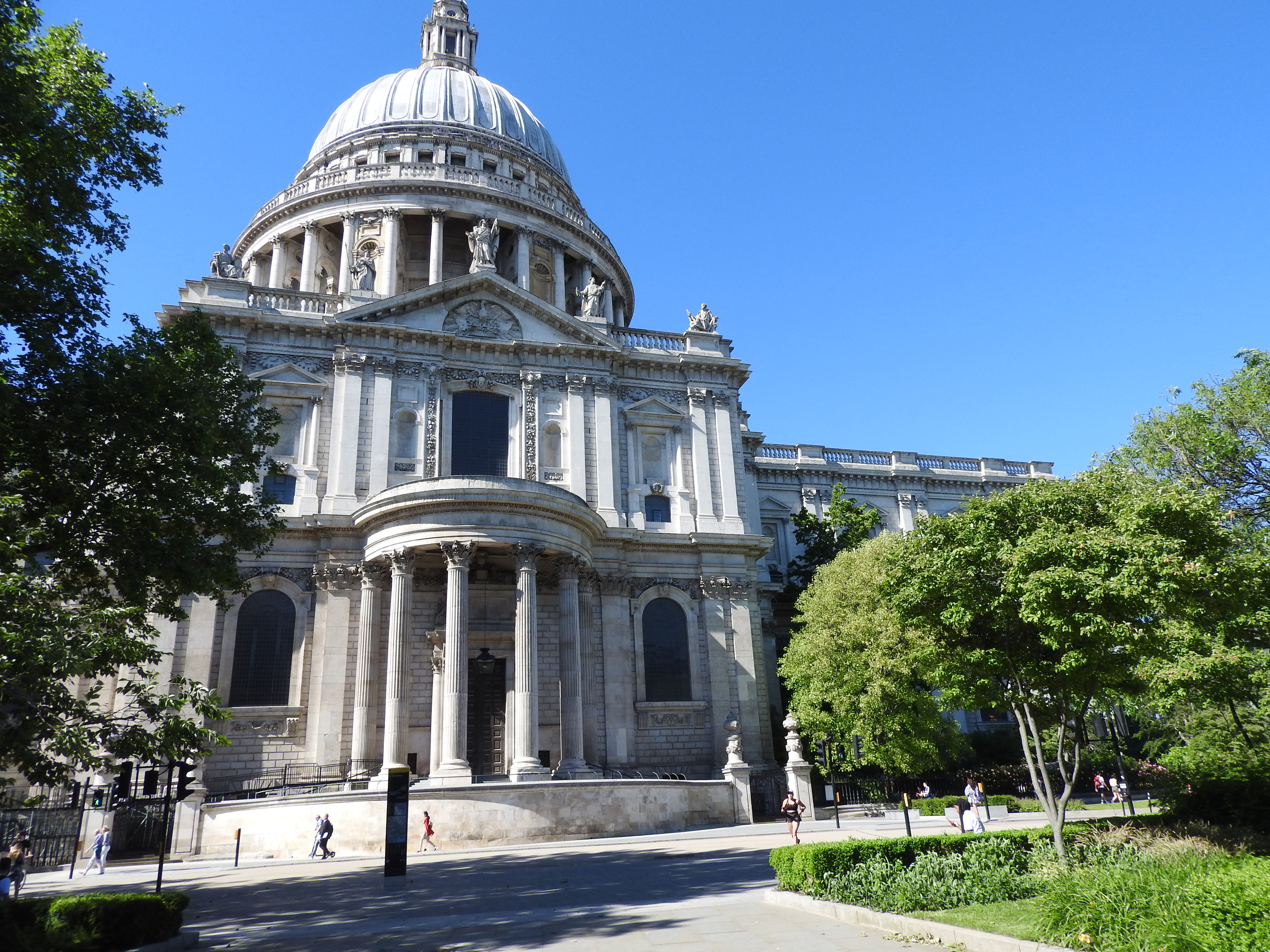
St Paul's Cathedral, London

On 24 June, a message sent from King George V to Younghusband of the Everest Committee appeared in The Times, in which the King conveyed "an expression of his sincere sympathy" to the families and committee concerning the deaths of the "two gallant explorers". On 17 October, a solemn memorial service at St Paul's Cathedral, was held in honour of the two climbers, at which the Right Reverend Henry Paget, Bishop of Chester, from whose diocese both men had come, delivered the sermon. The parents of both mountaineers, Ruth, relatives and close friends, members of the expeditions and Mount Everest Committee, the Alpine Club, Royal Geographical Society, and other explorers and scientists attended. Additionally present were representatives of the royal family; Sir Sidney Greville represented the King; Lieutenant colonel Sir Piers Legh, the Prince of Wales; Lieutenant Colin Buist, the Duke of York. Mallory's will was proven on 17 December; he bequeathed his estate of £1706 17s. 6d. (equivalent to £90,000 in 2025) to his wife.

== Lost on Everest for 75 years ==
=== Discovery of the ice axe (1933) ===
On 30 May 1933, during the 1933 British Mount Everest expedition, Percy Wyn-Harris and Lawrence Wager began their summit attempt from Camp VI, at 27,490 ft (8,380.4 m), on the Yellow Band, below the Northeast Ridge. At an elevation of 27,720 ft (8,450 m) after approximately one hour of climbing, Wyn-Harris, who was leading, found an ice axe located about 60 ft (18 m) below the crest of the Northeast Ridge and 751 ft (229 m) east of and below the First Step. The axe was left where it had been found and, after returning from a failed summit attempt, Wyn-Harris retrieved the axe, apparently leaving his own in its place. (Note: In the spring of 1999, Wyn-Harris's grandson, Steve, informed Jochen Hemmleb in an email exchange that his grandfather had written in his unpublished memoirs that he had returned to Camp VI with both axes.)

Because of its location the axe was thought to be either Mallory or Irvine's. During his descent with Edward Norton on 4 June 1924, Howard Somervell had dropped his ice axe in the Yellow Band near the Norton Couloir, (Note: On 4 June 1924, Somervell accidentally dropped his ice axe at an elevation c. 28,000 ft (8,534 m), which tumbled down the North Face from a location close to where he took the photo of Norton nearing his high point.) farther west from where Wyn-Harris had found the ice axe, and no mountaineers from the expeditions before 1933, other than Mallory and Irvine, had moved through the location where Wyn-Harris had discovered the axe. When Wyn-Harris showed the axe to Noel Odell in 1934, Odell noticed three parallel horizontal nick marks on its shaft. Odell thought it was a mark Irvine might have used on his equipment, and some members of Irvine's family seemed to remember seeing a similar marking. Mallory's widow Ruth told Odell that "as far as she was aware" Mallory did not mark his equipment with triple marks or any other type of mark, and therefore believed the axe belonged to Irvine. To Odell, Wyn-Harris suggested a porter may have cut the triple mark to identify individuals' property during the 1924 expedition, though this was not the practice of all of the 1924 porters. Wyn-Harris told Odell that his porter Pugla cut the X mark, seen lower down on the shaft of the axe, during the return journey from the 1933 expedition. Several 1933 expedition members thought the axe belonged to Mallory because it had a Swiss manufacturer, Willisch of Täsch, stamped on it, and Mallory had journeyed to the Alps shortly before the 1924 expedition, where he may have acquired it. They were unaware, however, that this manufacturer had supplied all members of the 1924 expedition with light axes, and Mallory or Irvine might have used them during their summit attempts. In 1962 Irvine's brother found a military swagger stick presumed to have belonged to Irvine, and on it were three horizontal identification nick marks resembling those on the axe discovered by Wyn-Harris in 1933, which seemed to suggest that the axe was Irvine's.

In 1977 Walt Unsworth, author of Everest: The Ultimate Book of the Ultimate Mountain, examined the axe and observed four sets of marks on its shaft. In addition to the three nicks seen by Odell and the cross mark cut by Pugla, he noted a single horizontal nick mark above the three observed by Odell and another three nick marks, though fainter in appearance, on the other side of the shaft opposite the cross mark.

=== Frank Smythe's sighting (1936) ===
"Since my search for the two Oxford fellows, I feel convinced that it marks the scene of an accident to Mallory and Irvine. There is something else... it's not to be written about, as the press would make an unpleasant sensation. I was scanning the face from the Base camp through a high-power telescope last year [1936] when I saw something queer in a gully below the scree shelf... it was a long way away and very small... but I've a six/six eyesight, and I do not believe it was a rock... when searching for the Oxford men on Mont Blanc, we looked down onto a boulder-strewn glacier and saw something which wasn't a rock either—it proved to be two bodies. The object was at precisely the point where Mallory and Irvine would have fallen had they rolled on over the scree slopes below the yellow band. I think it is highly probable that we shall find further evidence next year."

— Frank Smythe, in a letter to Edward Norton, 4 September 1937.

In 1937 Frank Smythe wrote to Edward Norton in reply to Norton's praise for Smythe's book Camp Six, an account of the 1933 expedition. In his letter he mentioned the discovery of the ice axe in 1933, which he felt certain marked the scene of an accident to Mallory and Irvine. Smythe said that when scanning Everest's North Face with a high-powered telescope during the 1936 British Mount Everest expedition he had spotted an object which he believed was either Mallory or Irvine. At the time he decided not to publicize what he had seen to avoid press sensationalism. Smythe's sighting remained unknown to the public until his son Tony Smythe revealed it in his 2013 book, My Father, Frank: Unresting Spirit of Everest.

=== Tom Holzel's theory (1971) ===
Everest historian Tom Holzel, co-author with Audrey Salkeld of The Mystery of Mallory and Irvine, first became interested in the two mountaineers after reading about them in a 1970 edition of The New Yorker. Holzel's theory, published in a 1971 edition of Mountain magazine, was that Mallory and Irvine split up soon after Odell had sighted them ascending the Second Step at 12:50 p.m. Each had only 1 1/2 hours of supplemental oxygen remaining, insufficient for both to reach the summit in two or three hours. Mallory took Irvine's oxygen equipment, belayed him down the Second Step—from which point Irvine would descend towards Camp VI at 26,700 ft (8,138 m)—and with the additional oxygen attempted to reach the summit alone. As Irvine descended, the "rather severe blizzard" described by Odell as lasting from approximately 2 to 4 p.m. covered the mountain with snow, causing him to slip and fall to his death. Continuing on, Mallory could have reached the summit in the late afternoon. Holzel theorised that from where the ice axe was found in 1933–presumably the scene of an accident—a body tumbling down the North Face would come to a halt on a snow terrace below at approximately 26,900 ft (8,200 m).

In 1980 Holzel received a letter from Hiroyuki Suzuki, foreign secretary of the Japanese Alpine Club. Suzuki's letter was in reply to Holzel, who had previously written to the Club about their upcoming 1979 Sino-Japanese Everest expedition, asking that they look for Irvine's body and camera on the snow terrace identified in his 1971 article. Suzuki's letter contained tragic news. On 12 October 1979, as their party attempted to reach the North Col, an avalanche swept three climbers to their deaths in a crevasse. The day before the fatal incident, one of the three climbers, Wang Hongbao, had told expedition leader Ryoten Hasegawa that he had seen "two deads" (dead bodies) during the 1975 Chinese Mount Everest expedition. One was close to a side moraine in the East Rongbuk Glacier below the 1975 expedition Camp III, and the other was on the Northeast Ridge route at an altitude of 26,570 ft (8,100 m). Suzuki said that although Hongbao did not speak English he repeated the words "English, English" when describing the bodies to Hasegawa. Suzuki thought that the first body was possibly Maurice Wilson, but could offer no identification for the second body. Hongbao said he had seen torn clothes on the second body and buried it under the snow. (Note: In 1986, before the 1986 Mount Everest North Face Research Expedition began, its leader Andrew Harvard arranged a meeting for a Japanese climber to interview Ryoten Hasegawa. During the interview, Hasegawa wrote down for the first time what Wang Hongbao had told him in 1979 about his sighting of a body on 5 May 1975 at an altitude of 26,570 ft (8,100 m). Later, the expedition received an English translation of the letter Hasegawa had written during the interview, in which he expressed an apology for his memory of some unclear points. He communicated that the only language he understood was Japanese, and Hongbao only spoke Chinese, and neither understood English. Hasegawa explained that their communication consisted of "very simple words, by characters written on the snow and for the most part gesture," and "English" was the only word they both comprehended from that language. Hasegawa said that Hongbao pointed towards the Northeast Ridge, stating, "8,100-metre Engleese," and made a gesture of sleeping by placing the palms of his hands together against his cheek, slanting his head to one side. He added, "Hongbao opened his mouth, pointed his finger to his cheek, pecked it slightly, and whirled it as if to catch a dragonfly. He also gestured at his clothing, picking at it, moving his finger to his mouth and blowing off it." Hasegawa interpreted that perhaps Hongbao meant that the dead mountaineer's mouth was agape, birds pecked at the cheek, and it was an old body with tattered clothing brought about by the elements. Hasegawa was confident he and Hongbao had discussed the body's posture and precise location, but could no longer remember the specifics. However, he clearly remembered when he wrote in the snow with his axe, in Chinese characters, "A body of an Englishman at 8,100 metres?" Hongbao nodded yes.)

=== Mount Everest North Face Research Expedition (1986) ===
On 25 August 1986 the Everest North Face Research Expedition, organized by Tom Holzel, arrived at the North Base Camp to try to determine what had happened to Mallory and Irvine. Their primary objective was to ascend to the 27,000 ft (8,230 m) snow terrace where they hoped to locate the remains of the "dead" English that Hongbao claimed to have seen during the 1975 Chinese expedition. In addition, they hoped that if the body or bodies were indeed Mallory or Irvine, the cameras they carried might have images that could help solve the mystery of whether or not they had reached the summit. Their secondary objective was to search the area immediately above the Second Step where they hoped to find Mallory and Irvine's used oxygen cylinders, proving they had reached that elevation and thus possibly the summit. They successfully established Camp V on the North Ridge at an elevation of 25,500 ft (7,772 m) but snowstorms and avalanches prevented them from reaching 27,500 ft (8,382 m) where they had planned to establish Camp VI and search for Mallory and Irvine. Although that effort was unsuccessful they did find two oxygen cylinders from the 1922 expedition.

=== Mallory and Irvine Research Expedition (1999) ===
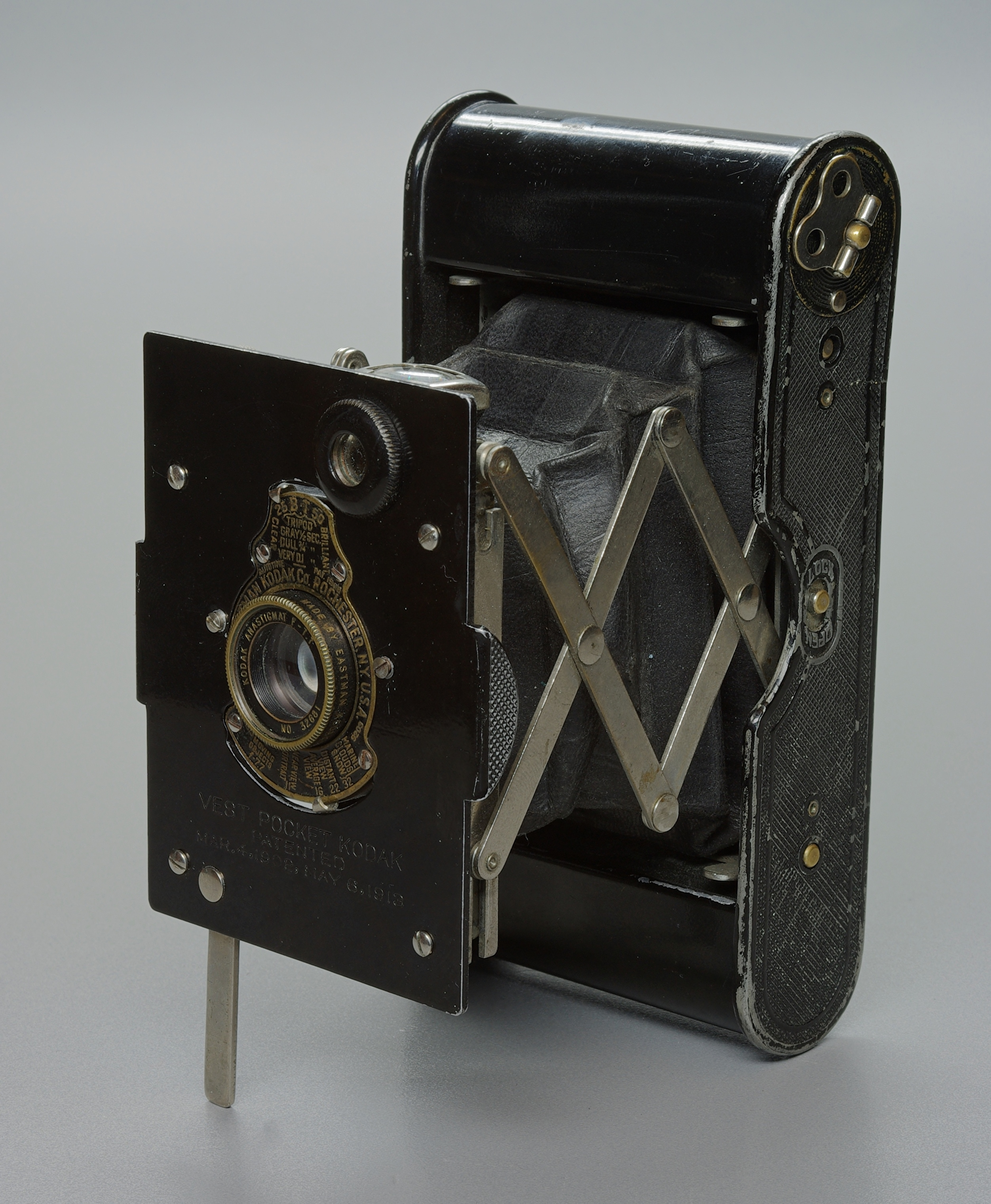
Vest Pocket Kodak

The 1999 Mallory and Irvine Research Expedition was undertaken to determine whether Mallory and/or Irvine had been the first to summit Everest. Objectives included locating Irvine’s body and retrieving his camera that might hold proof of any summit success. It was organised by expedition leader Eric Simonson, advised by researcher Jochen Hemmleb, and included mountaineers Conrad Anker, cameraman Dave Hahn and others.

After re-examining the historical record of Everest North Face expeditions, Jochen Hemmleb realized that, other than artefacts such as the ice axe found in 1933, the only seemingly solid information about Mallory and Irvine was Wang Hongbao's assertion that he had discovered an "English" body during a twenty-minute walk from Camp VI. The initial challenge was to identify the location of Chinese Camp VI and use it as the centre point of a circular search zone with a twenty-minute walk radius. From a photo of Camp VI, Hemmleb determined it was on an ill-defined rib of rock that bisected the snow terrace on the North Face.

On the morning of 1 May 1999, Anker, Hahn, Norton, Politz, and Richards reached 26,900 ft (8,199 m) where they established Camp VI. From there, they set out for the "ill-defined rib", traversing west over the North Face's precipitously angled terrain. Anker searched on intuition and descended to the lower margin of the snow terrace, where it drops away approximately 7,000 ft (2,000 m) to the head of the central Rongbuk Glacier. While zig-zagging back up in the direction of Camp VI at 26,800 ft (8,156 m) he noticed a "patch of white" to his west. Upon investigation he found it was a body partially frozen into the scree with the remnants of a braided cotton climbing rope tied to its waist and tangled around the body.

Since it was believed that Irvine had fallen from the place where the ice axe was found in 1933 the team expected the body to be his, but Politz said, "This is not him." (Note: The reason for Politz's scepticism regarding the body being Irvine's was its position. He remembered that Wang Hongbao had discovered a body with its mouth agape and one cheek pecked at by goraks, but this body was lying prone.) After finding garment labels reading "G. Mallory" the expedition members realised that they had found, not Irvine as expected, but Mallory. The team used ice axes and pocketknives to search the site for any artefacts, especially the Vest Pocket Kodak camera that Somervell had lent Mallory for his attempt. If found, the camera might contain images that could help solve the mystery of whether or not the summit was reached for the first time in 1924, nearly 30 years before the first confirmed summit in 1953. (Experts from Kodak said it might be possible to develop images from the film and have drawn up guidelines for any expedition that might discover the camera.) Personal possessions including letters were found on Mallory's body (Note: In an interview with the Sunday Mirror in 1999, Mallory's daughter, Frances Clare, said that her father climbed Mount Everest with a photograph of her mother, Ruth, and one of her letters in his jacket pocket and that Mallory told his wife, "before he set out," that if he ever attained the summit, he intended to leave a photograph of her there. Ruth had told Clare as a teenager about the letter and photograph. Based on what she had been told, she incorrectly stated in the interview that a letter from her mother was found on Mallory's body. In fact, no letter from Ruth or picture of her was found.) but the most sought-after object, the camera, was not found. The mountaineers buried Mallory, covering his remains with rocks, and Politz read a Church of England committal ceremony provided by the Bishop of Bristol.

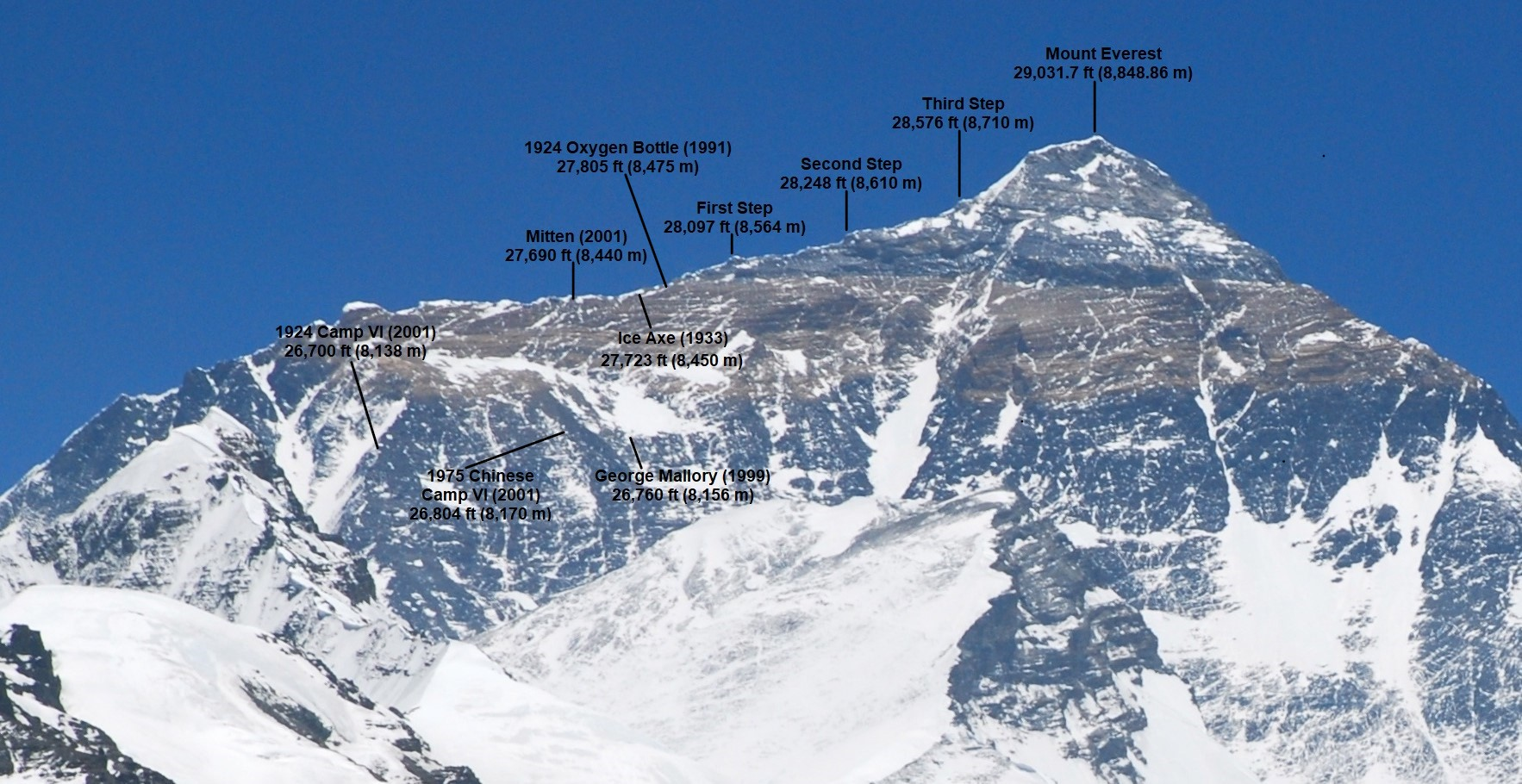
North Face of Everest, altitudes of discoveries, the Three Steps, and its summit

Sir Edmund Hillary welcomed the discovery of Mallory's body and described it as "very appropriate" that Mallory might have summited decades earlier. "He was really the initial pioneer of the whole idea of climbing Mount Everest," Hillary said. Mallory's son John said, "To me the only way you achieve a summit is to come back alive; the job's half done if you don't get down again."

=== Further expeditions ===
The 2001 Mallory and Irvine Research Expedition retraced Mallory and Irvine’s route and attempted to find artefacts from the early attempts. Jake Norton and Brent Okita discovered the remnants of the 1924 Camp VI at an altitude of 26,700 ft (8,138 m), from which Mallory and Irvine had departed on 8 June. Norton found a wool mitten of unknown origin on the Northeast Ridge at an altitude of 27,690 ft (8,440 m) that may have belonged to Mallory or Irvine. There were research initiatives in 2004, 2010, 2011, 2012, 2018, 2019 and the 2007 Altitude Everest expedition that retraced Mallory and Irvine's footsteps.

== Timeline ==
- 1893: Aged 7, climbed the roof of a church.
- 1904: Aged 18, made his first significant climb by summiting Mont Blanc, the highest peak in Western Europe.
- 1909: First ascent of the Southeast Ridge of Nesthorn (3,822 m).
- 1911: First ascent of the Western Ridge of Herbétet (3,778 m) and third ascent of the Southeast Ridge (Frontier Ridge) of Mont Maudit (4,465 m).
- 1912: Established a new route on the West Face of Dent Blanche, marking a first ascent of this face.
- 1915–18: Officer in the First World War.
- 1919: First ascent of a new route on the Aiguille des Grands Charmoz (3,445 m) and Aiguille du Midi (3,842 m), later named the "Rectified Mallory-Porter Route."
- 1920: Summiting the Matterhorn (4,478 m) and Zinalrothorn (4,221 m).
- 1921: First British reconnaissance expedition to Everest, helping to map out potential routes to the summit.
- 1922: Second British expedition to Everest, where his team set a world altitude record of 27,300 feet (8,231 m) using supplemental oxygen.
- 1924: Disappeared near the summit along with Andrew "Sandy" Irvine, leading to one of the greatest mysteries in mountaineering.
- 1924–1950s: Speculation about whether Mallory and Irvine reached the summit, adding to the mystery surrounding their disappearance.
- 1953: Edmund Hillary and Tenzing Norgay became the first climbers confirmed to have reached the summit of Everest, renewing interest in Mallory and Irvine.
- 1975: A Chinese climber reported finding the body of an "old English dead" climber on the north face of Everest, likely either Mallory or Irvine.
- 1986: Climbers Conrad Anker and David Roberts examined the route Mallory might have taken and considered the possibility of successful ascent.
- 1999: Publication of Ghosts of Everest: The Search for Mallory & Irvine brought renewed attention to the mystery of Mallory and Irvine.
- 1999: Mallory's mortal remains and personal effects were discovered, but whether he had reached the summit remains unknown.
- 2007: Conrad Anker, who had helped discover Mallory's body, completed a replica climb of Everest using period gear similar to what Mallory would have used.
- 2010: The film The Wildest Dream highlighted both his life and modern efforts to uncover the truth.
- 2024: A National Geographic team found Irvine's partial remains on the Central Rongbuk Glacier at an altitude at least 7,000 feet lower than where Mallory's body was discovered.

== Theories ==
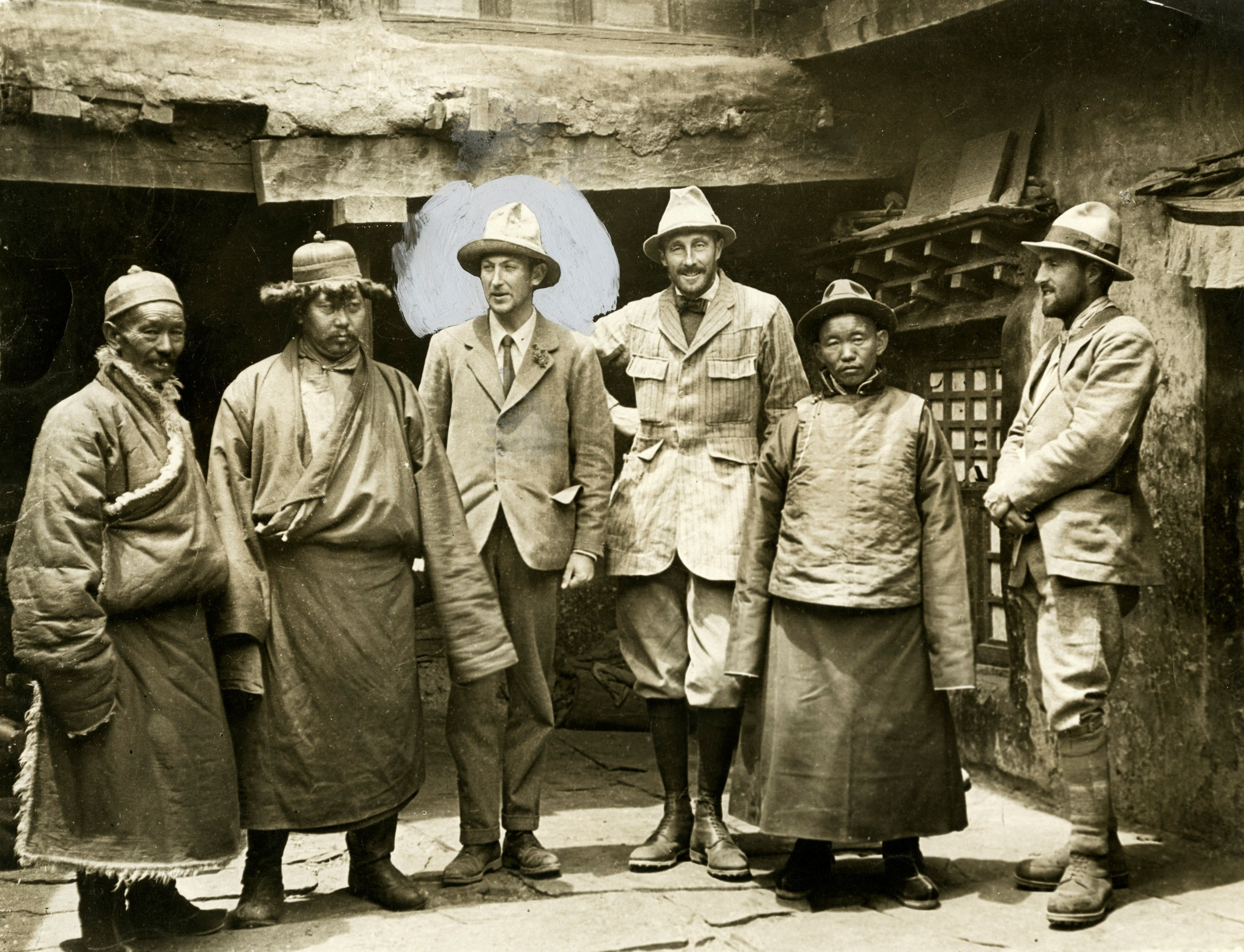
Some members of the 1924 expedition: Mallory is highlighted beside Edward F. Norton to the right and Geoffrey Bruce far right, in the town of Shelkar. The local Dzongpen (governor) is second from right.

=== "Second Step" ===
As Mallory and Irvine used the Northeast Ridge route, they would have had to free-climb the formidable Second Step. Of the Three Steps on the upper Northeast Ridge, the Second and most prominent, rising approximately 100 ft (30 m) and consisting of precipitous, brittle rock at an extreme altitude of 28,250 ft (8,610 m), is the most demanding. The final upper section of this step is its crux, a 16 ft (4.87 m) nearly vertical headwall slab to which the 1975 Chinese expedition affixed a 15 ft (4.6 m) aluminium ladder. Although disputed, the first successful ascent of the Second Step occurred during the 1960 Chinese Mount Everest expedition, as all four mountaineers were breathing supplemental oxygen. They used a technique called "short ladder" in which Chu Yin-hau stood on Liu Lianman's shoulders to climb to the top of the crux. Chu Yin-hau then belayed himself to a rock at the top of the Step and brought others up on the rope. It took 3 hours for 4 mountaineers to ascend the crux, and they used pitons, which neither Mallory nor Irvine had.

In 1985, during full-monsoon conditions and without supplementary oxygen, Òscar Cadiach, climbing on lead, achieved the first successful free-climb of the Second Step, ascending the crux on belay with a sling tied to one of the rungs of the Chinese ladder. He graded the vertical crack, that forms the crux, at about 5.8. In 2001, Theo Fritsche free-soloed the crux without supplementary oxygen, and assessed it as about 5.7. In 2003, Nickolay Totmjanin free-climbed it without supplementary oxygen. On the 2007 Altitude expedition, Anker and Leo Houlding successfully free-climbed the crux headwall, having first removed the ladder, both rating it about 5.9. Although the crux has been free-climbed, questions remain, e.g. concerning oxygen.

=== Western disturbance ===
Research published in 2010 indicates an extreme storm may have contributed to the deaths of Mallory and Irvine. Physicist George Moore discovered meteorological data from the 1924 expedition at the Royal Geographical Society's library in London. The data consisted of daily barometric pressure and temperature measurements recorded at Base Camp at 16,500 ft (5,029 m). Temperature measurements were also recorded at higher camps. The data collected, together with an analysed sea-level pressure map hand-drawn by the India Meteorological Department, were used to show that Mallory and Irvine's summit attempt occurred when there was a drop in barometric pressure and temperature, which was likely the result of the passage of an upper-level trough. This is known locally as a western disturbance. The authors hypothesised that the passage of the disturbance possibly triggered an outbreak of convective activity that resulted in the blizzard, witnessed by observation, engulfing Everest during the attempt. Odell described the morning of 8 June as "clear and not unduly cold", with snowfall and increasing winds beginning at approximately 2:00 p.m., which he described as a "rather severe blizzard," lasting about two hours and possibly severe enough to force Mallory and Irvine to abandon their bid. Records show a drop in barometric pressure at Base Camp of 18 millibars during the attempt. A drop of a similar magnitude possibly occurred at higher altitudes on the Himalayan peak. This decrease in barometric pressure likely induced aggravation of their hypoxic state. Also, if they had run out of supplemental oxygen during the early afternoon, this would have exacerbated their hypoxic condition. The cumulative effects of hypoxia, fatigue and bitter cold during a severe blizzard would have left Mallory and Irvine at their limits of endurance. The authors believe there is persuasive evidence the severe weather they experienced may have been more extreme than previously thought. This harsh weather and decreased barometric pressure may have contributed to their demise.

== Legacy ==
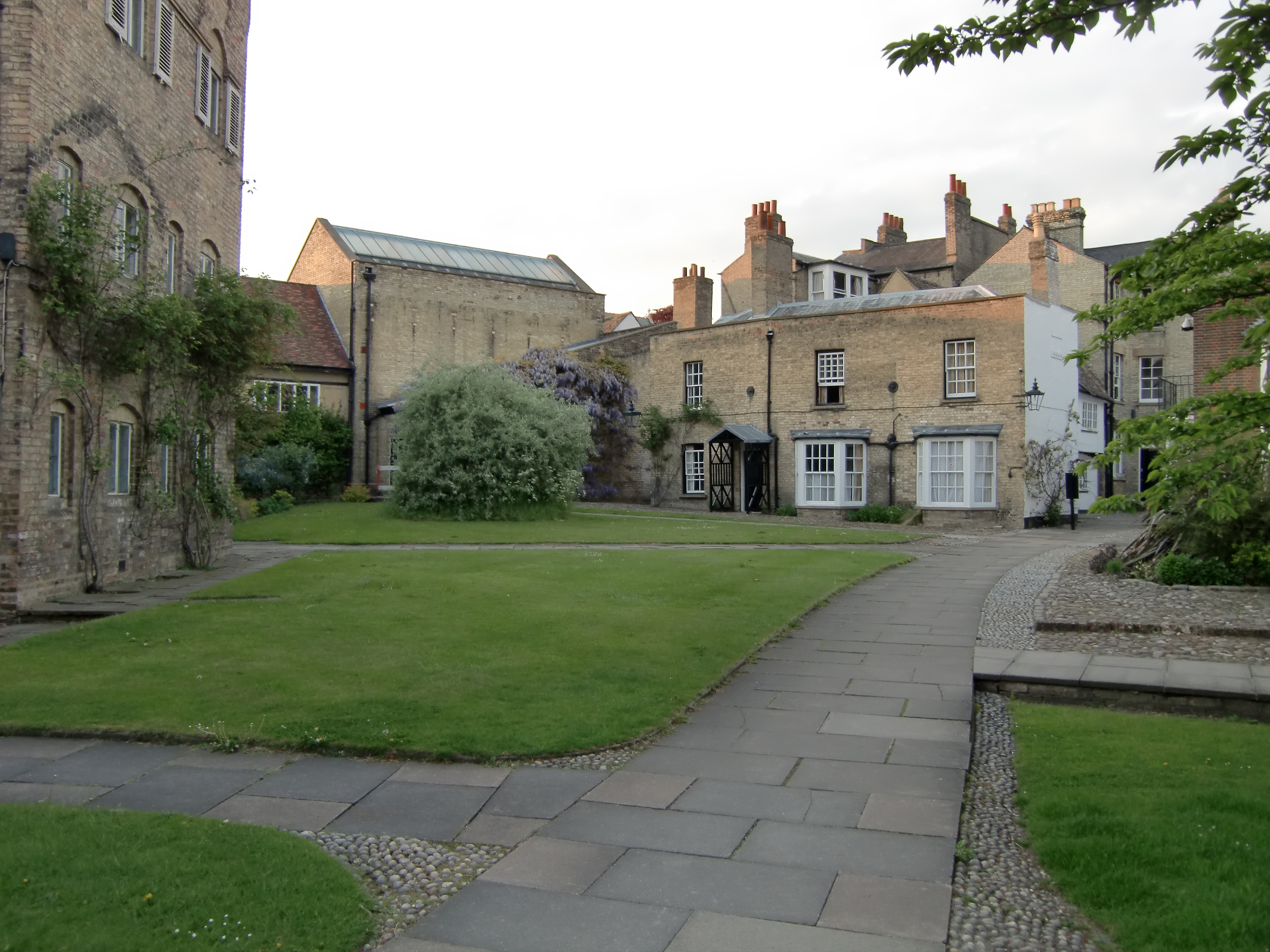
Mallory Court at Magdalene College, Cambridge, his college

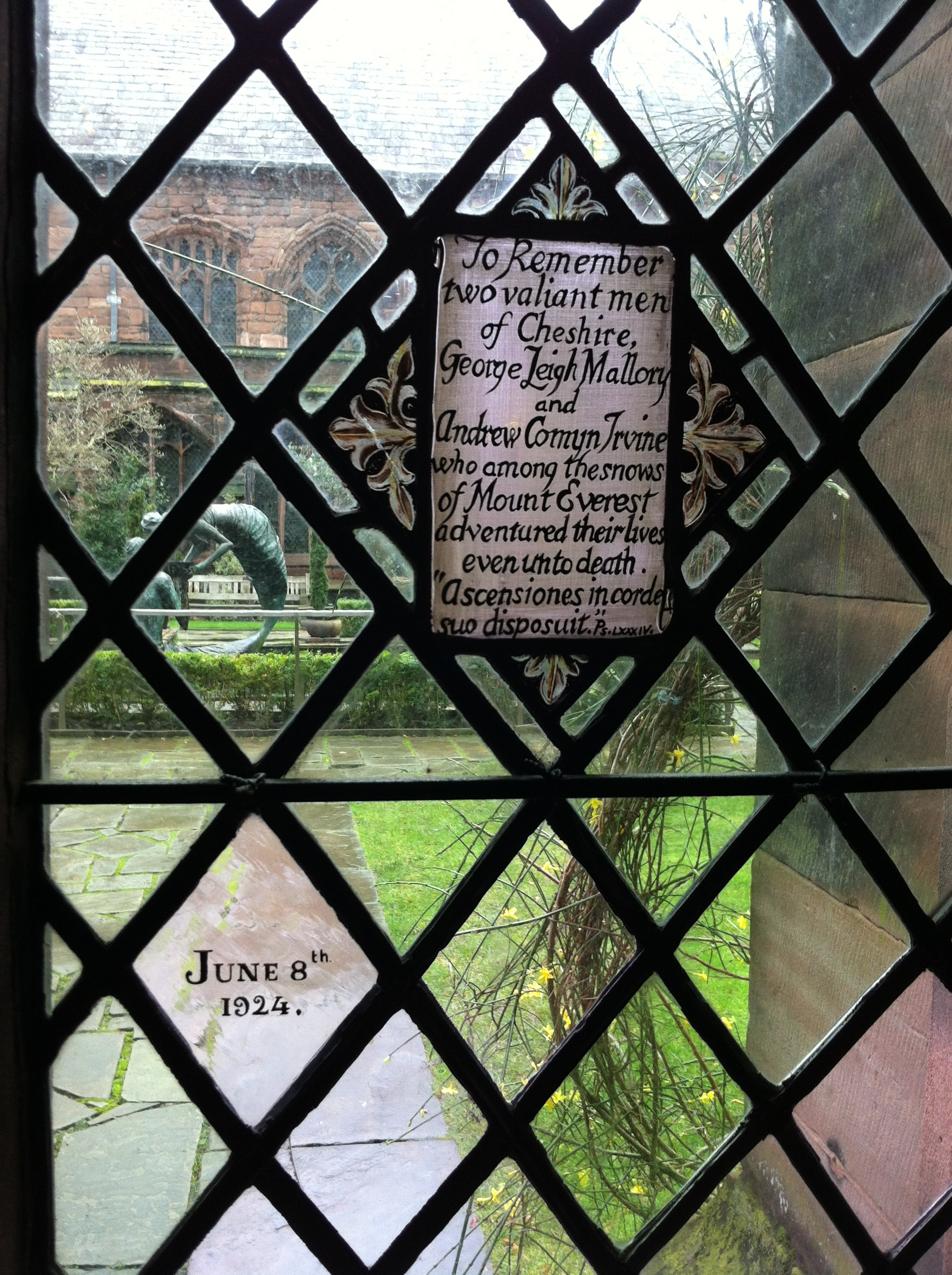
Memorial to George Mallory and Andrew Irvine in Chester Cathedral

At Winchester College there is a memorial to him in the cloister adjacent to the college chapel. Mallory was honoured by having a court named after him at Magdalene College, with an inscribed stone commemorating his death set above the doorway to one of the buildings. To commemorate Mallory's position as Magdalene Boat Club Captain, the Friends of Magdalene Boat Club changed their name to the Mallory Club. A plaque commemorates him in the South African Cloisters at Charterhouse. A stained-glass triptych window at St Wilfrid's Church, Mobberley, Cheshire, portraying three figures from English mythology, Saint George, King Arthur and Sir Galahad, also has two panels with inscriptions commemorating Mallory. In addition to his father, Herbert Leigh Mallory, the rector of Mobberley, Mallory's grandfather, George Leigh Mallory, was the parish's rector. In the cloisters of Chester Cathedral, there is a memorial window commemorating Mallory and Irvine. Two high peaks in California's Sierra Nevada, Mount Mallory and Mount Irvine, are named after them.

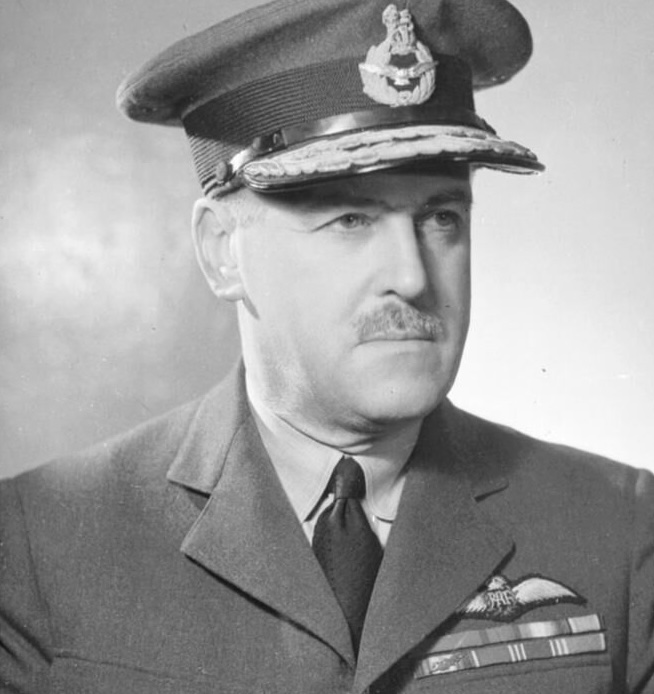
Sir Trafford Leigh-Mallory

Two other members of Mallory's family died in the mountains. His brother, Air Chief Marshal Sir Trafford Leigh-Mallory, died when the Avro York carrying him crashed in the French Alps in 1944, killing all on board. Mallory's daughter, Frances Clare, married physiologist Glenn Allan Millikan, who was killed in a climbing accident in 1947 at Buzzard's Roost in Fall Creek Falls State Park, Tennessee.

Frances Mallory's sons, Richard and George Millikan, became respected climbers in the 1960s and 70s. In July 1963, Richard Millikan and other members of the Harvard Mountaineering Club, made the first ascent of the central rib of the Wickersham Wall on the north face of Denali, reaching North Peak at 19,470 ft (5,934 m). In 1995, together with six other climbers, George Millikan reached the summit of Everest via the North Col-North Ridge-Northeast Ridge route as part of an American Everest expedition and evoked a sense of "unfinished business" by leaving a photo of his grandparents on the summit.

Mallory was filmed by expedition cameraman John Noel, who released his film of the 1924 expedition, The Epic of Everest. Film director George Lowe used footage from The Epic of Everest in the 1953 documentary, The Conquest of Everest. A documentary on the 2001 Mallory and Irvine Research Expedition, Found On Everest: Detectives on the Roof of the World, was produced by Riley Morton. Brian Blessed played Mallory in Galahad of Everest, a 1991 re-creation of his last climb. In Anthony Geffen's 2010 documentary about Mallory's life and final expedition, The Wildest Dream, Conrad Anker and Leo Houlding attempt to reconstruct the climb, dressed and equipped like Mallory and Irvine.

Mallory and Irvine inspired Baku Yumemakura to author the 1998 novel The Summit of the Gods, which in turn inspired a manga series published from 2000–03, which was adapted into an anime-influenced animation film, Le Sommet des Dieux, in 2021. Everest, a proposed Hollywood version of the 1924 attempt, adapted from Jeffrey Archer's novel Paths of Glory, to be directed by Doug Liman, had Ewan McGregor slated to play Mallory. As of 2022 it was not in production.

In September 2009, a temporary exhibition detailing Mallory and Irvine's lives opened at the Salt Museum (now Weaver Hall Museum and Workhouse), Northwich. The exhibition, "Above the Clouds – Mallory and Irvine and the Quest for Everest," featured items discovered on Mallory's body, as well as artefacts and photos from the 1924 expedition.

Mallory was referenced by President John F. Kennedy in 1962, in his "We choose to go to the Moon" speech, regarded as one of the greatest speeches of the 20th century: "... the great British explorer George Mallory, who was to die on Mount Everest, was asked why did he want to climb it. He said, "Because it is there". Well, space is there, and we're going to climb it ..."

== See also ==
- List of people who died climbing Mount Everest
- List of solved missing person cases (pre-1950)
- List of unsolved deaths
