= HMHS Letitia =

Two hospital ships bore the name Letitia:

- HMHS Letitia (1912), British ship which served during World War I
- HMHS Letitia (1924), British ship which served during World War II
