= Mount Sam =

Mountain in British Columbia, Canada

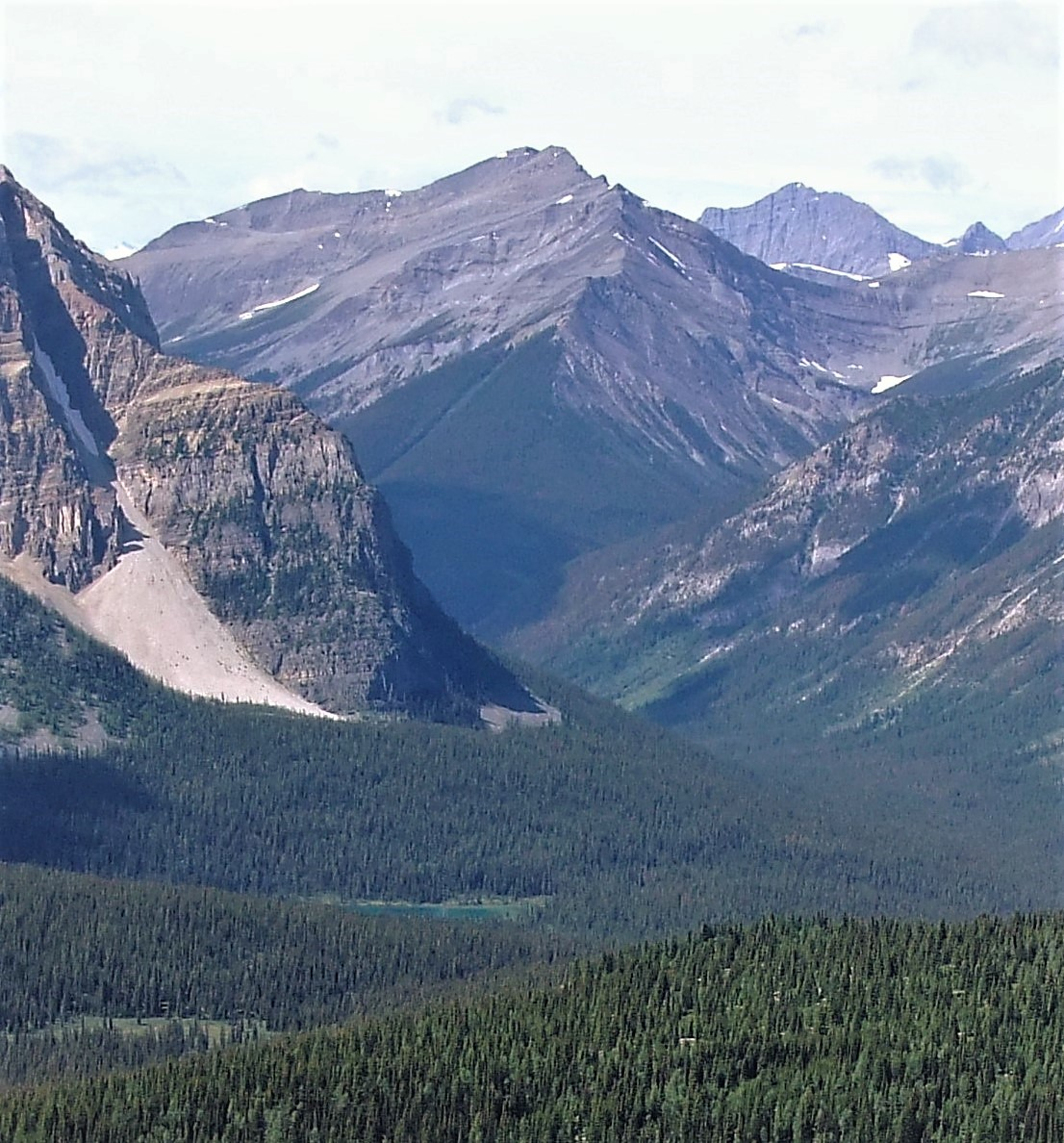
- East-northeast aspect

Highest point
- Elevation: 2,871 m (9,419 ft)
- Prominence: 443 m (1,453 ft)
- Parent peak: Octopus Mountain (2,932 m)
- Isolation: 2.25 km (1.40 mi)
- Listing: Mountains of British Columbia
- Coordinates: 50°52′49″N 115°48′33″W

Naming
- Etymology: Peter M. Sam

Geography
- Location within British Columbia Location within Canada
- Interactive map of Mount Sam
- Country: Canada
- Province: British Columbia
- District: Kootenay Land District
- Protected area: Mount Assiniboine Provincial Park
- Parent range: Mitchell Range; Canadian Rockies
- Topo map: NTS 82J13 Mount Assiniboine

Geology
- Rock age: Cambrian
- Rock type: Sedimentary rock

Mount Sam is a 2,871-metre (9,419-foot) mountain summit located in Mount Assiniboine Provincial Park of British Columbia, Canada.

== Description ==
Mount Sam is situated 12 km (7.5 mi) west of the Continental Divide and is part of the Mitchell Range which is a sub-range of the Canadian Rockies. Precipitation runoff from the peak's east slope drains into the Mitchell River via Companion Creek and the west slope drains into Lachine Creek which is a tributary of the Simpson River. Topographic relief is modest as the summit rises 1,170 m (3,840 ft) above Lachine Creek in 3 km (1.9 mi) and 1,200 m (3,900 ft) above the Mitchell River in 4 km (2.5 mi).

== Etymology ==
The mountain was named in remembrance of Army Private Peter Martin Sam, Royal Canadian Artillery, of Athalmer who was killed in action on April 21, 1941, age 20, during World War II. The mountain's toponym was officially adopted on October 12, 1966, by the Geographical Names Board of Canada.

== Geology ==
Mount Sam is composed of sedimentary rock laid down during the Precambrian to Jurassic periods. Formed in shallow seas, this sedimentary rock was pushed east and over the top of younger rock during the Laramide orogeny.

== Climate ==
Based on the Köppen climate classification, Mount Sam is located in a subarctic climate zone with cold, snowy winters, and mild summers. Winter temperatures can drop below −20 °C with wind chill factors below −30 °C.

== Gallery ==
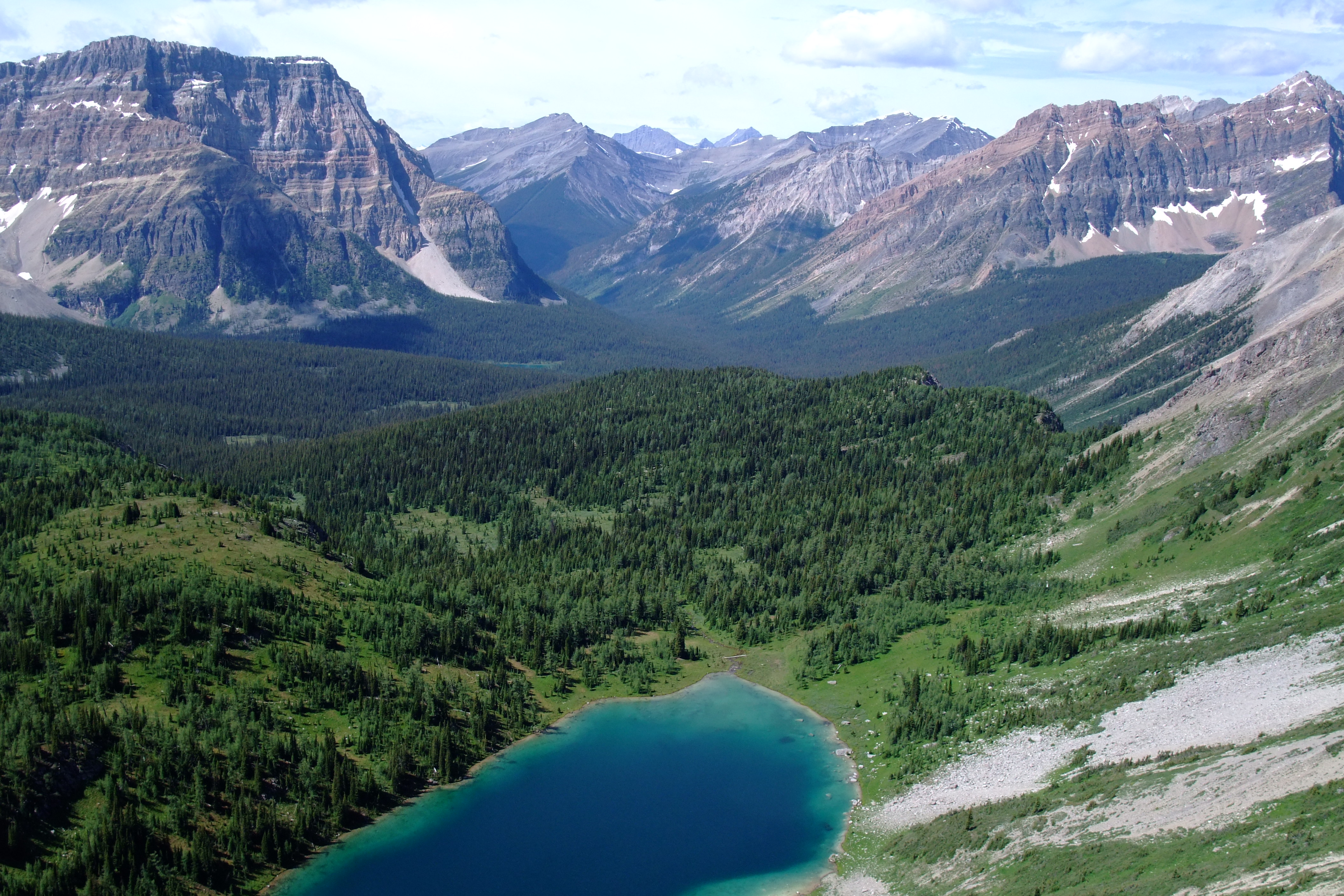
L→R: Mount Watson, Mount Sam, Mount Selkirk, Octopus Mountain, Indian Peak

== See also ==
- Geography of British Columbia
