= Naiset Point =

Mountain in British Columbia, Canada

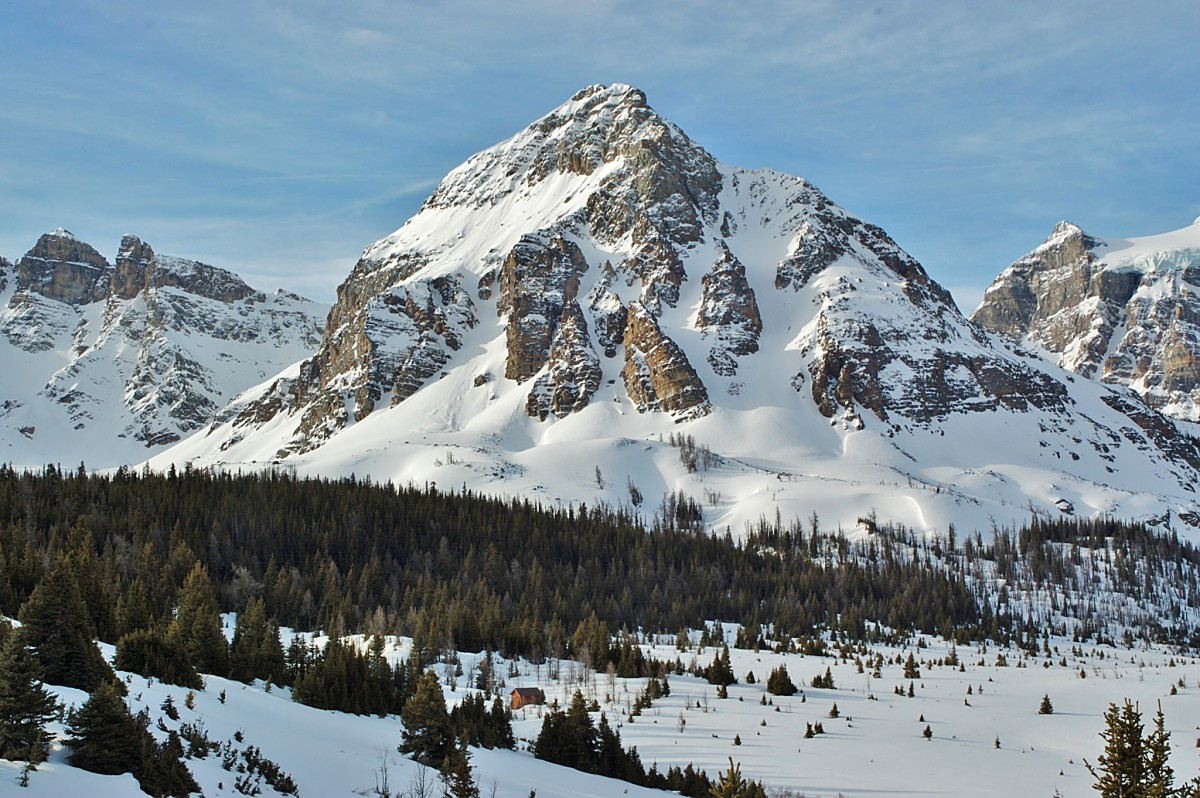
- Naiset Point

Highest point
- Elevation: 2,755 m (9,039 ft)
- Prominence: 45 m (148 ft)
- Parent peak: Mount Assiniboine (3616 m)
- Coordinates: 50°53′42″N 115°37′03″W

Geography
- Location within British Columbia Location within Canada
- Interactive map of Naiset Point
- Country: Canada
- Province: British Columbia
- District: Kootenay Land District
- Parent range: Canadian Rockies
- Topo map: NTS 82J13 Mount Assiniboine

Geology
- Rock age: Cambrian
- Rock type: sedimentary rock

Climbing
- First ascent: 1920 H.E. Bulyea, N. Allen, M. Gold, D.J. McGeary, J. Stewart, E.L. Tayler, C.G. Wates

Naiset Point is a 2,755-metre (9,039-foot) mountain summit located in Mount Assiniboine Provincial Park, in the Canadian Rockies of British Columbia, Canada. The mountain is situated 1.0 km (0.62 mi) southeast of Lake Magog, and at the end of the ridge extending north from Terrapin Mountain. Naiset Point is composed of sedimentary rock laid down during the Cambrian period. Formed in shallow seas, this sedimentary rock was pushed east and over the top of younger rock during the Laramide orogeny.

== History ==
The mountain was named in 1913 by The Interprovincial Boundary Survey for the word naiset which translates from the First Nations word for sunset.

The first ascent of Naiset Point was made in 1920 by H.E. Bulyea, N. Allen, M. Gold, D.J. McGeary, J. Stewart, E.L. Tayler, and C.G. Wates.

The mountain's name was officially adopted in 1924 when approved by the Geographical Names Board of Canada.

== Climate ==
Based on the Köppen climate classification, Naiset Point is located in a subarctic climate zone with cold, snowy winters, and mild summers. Temperatures can drop below −20 °C with wind chill factors below −30 °C. Precipitation runoff from Naiset Point drains into Lake Magog.

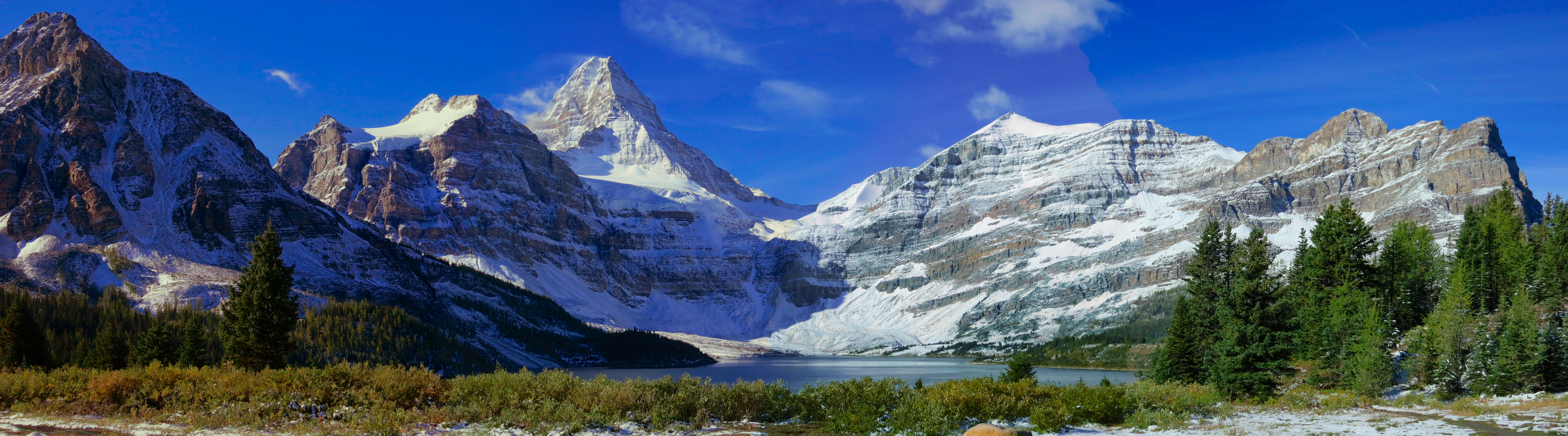
Lake Magog area. Left to right: Naiset Point, Mount Magog, Mount Assiniboine, Wedgwood Peak, Sunburst Peaks

== See also ==
- List of mountains of Canada
- Geography of British Columbia
- Geology of British Columbia
