= Lake Magog (British Columbia) =

Lake in British Columbia, Canada

- Magog Lake
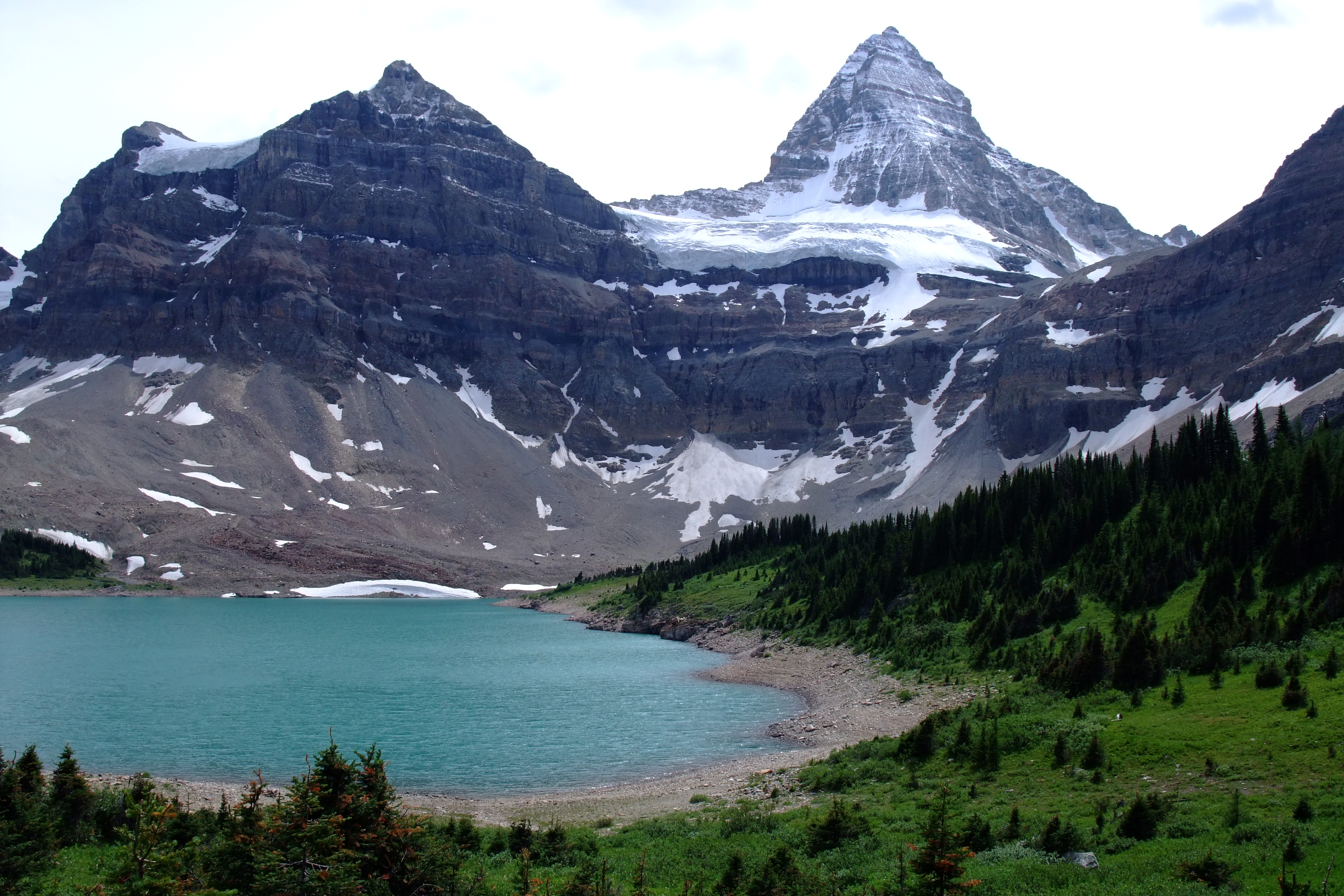
- Looking south to Lake Magog with Mount Magog (left) and Mount Assiniboine

- Location within British Columbia
- Location: Mount Assiniboine Provincial Park
- Coordinates: 50°54′08″N 115°37′57″W
- Primary outflows: Magog Creek
- Basin countries: Canada

Lake Magog or Magog Lake is a remote wilderness lake in Mount Assiniboine Provincial Park, British Columbia, Canada. (Note: Officially gazetted as Lake Magog but BC Parks commonly refers to it as Magog Lake.)

== Geography ==
The lake is bounded on the south by Mount Magog 3,092 m (10,144 ft) and Mount Assiniboine 3,618 m (11,870 ft), Sunburst Peaks 2,849 m (9,347 ft) to the west, with Naiset Point 2,755 m (9,039 ft) and Terrapin Mountain 2,954 m (9,692 ft) on the east side.

== Access ==
The lake can be reached by following hiking trails through Assiniboine Pass or Wonder Pass, from the trailhead that begins at the Mount Shark parking lot in Kananaskis or from a trail that begins at Sunshine Village in Banff National Park. There is no vehicle or bicycle access in the park. Alternatively, a helicopter flight can be arranged through the Assiniboine Lodge.

The Magog Lake campground has 40 sites that are open year round but reservations are required from late June to late September.

== See also ==
- List of lakes of British Columbia
