= Nub Peak =

Mountain in the country of Canada

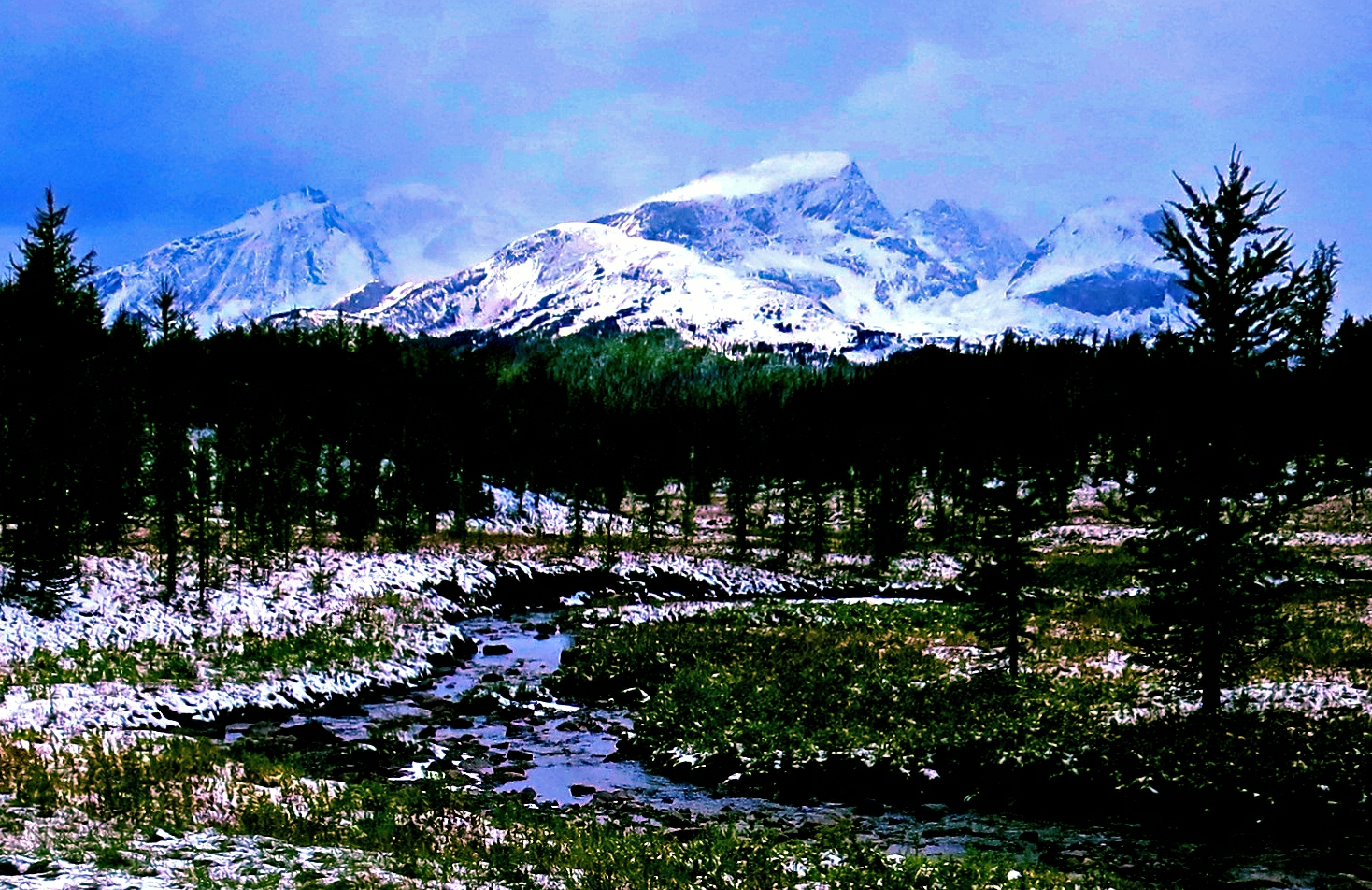
- Nub Peak

Highest point
- Elevation: 2,746 m (9,009 ft)
- Prominence: 121 m (397 ft)
- Parent peak: Nestor Peak (2,972 m)
- Listing: Mountains of British Columbia
- Coordinates: 50°55′59″N 115°39′28″W

Geography
- Location within British Columbia Location within Canada
- Interactive map of Nub Peak
- Location: Mount Assiniboine Provincial Park; British Columbia, Canada
- District: Kootenay Land District
- Parent range: Park Ranges; Canadian Rockies
- Topo map: NTS 82J13 Mount Assiniboine

Geology
- Rock age: Cambrian
- Rock type: sedimentary rock

Climbing
- Easiest route: Scrambling

Nub Peak is a 2,746-metre (9,009-foot) mountain summit located in Mount Assiniboine Provincial Park, in the Canadian Rockies of British Columbia, Canada. Its nearest higher peak is Nestor Peak, 4.0 km (2.5 mi) to the west. The mountain is situated north of Sunburst Peaks, with Elizabeth Lake and Cerulean Lake in between. The Continental Divide and Assiniboine Pass are situated 3.5 km (2.2 mi) to the east. Nub Peak is famous for its panoramic view of Mount Assiniboine with its surrounding lakes and peaks. The mountain's descriptive name was officially adopted in 1924. An arm extending southwest from Nub is officially known as Chucks Ridge, and an arm extending southeast is officially called Nublet. Nub Peak is composed of sedimentary rock laid down during the Cambrian period and pushed east over the top of younger rock during the Laramide orogeny.

== Climate ==
Based on the Köppen climate classification, Nub Peak is located in a subarctic climate zone with cold, snowy winters, and mild summers. Winter temperatures can drop below −20 °C with wind chill factors below −30 °C.

== Gallery ==
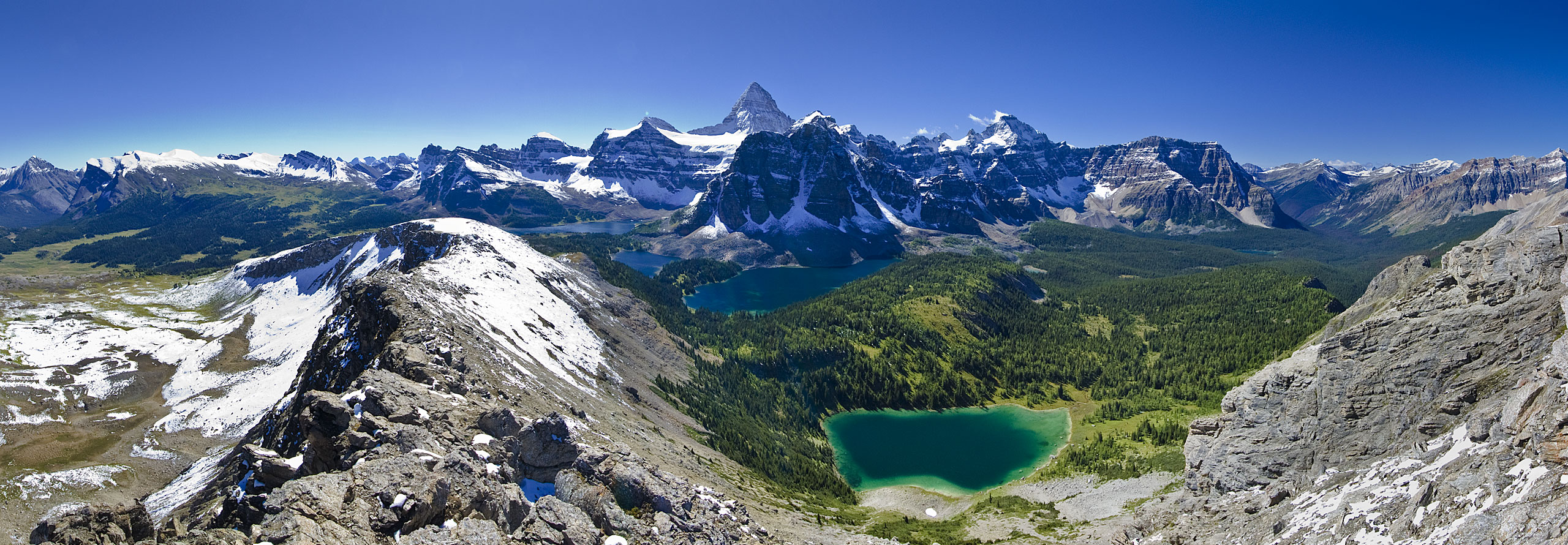
Nub Peak panorama

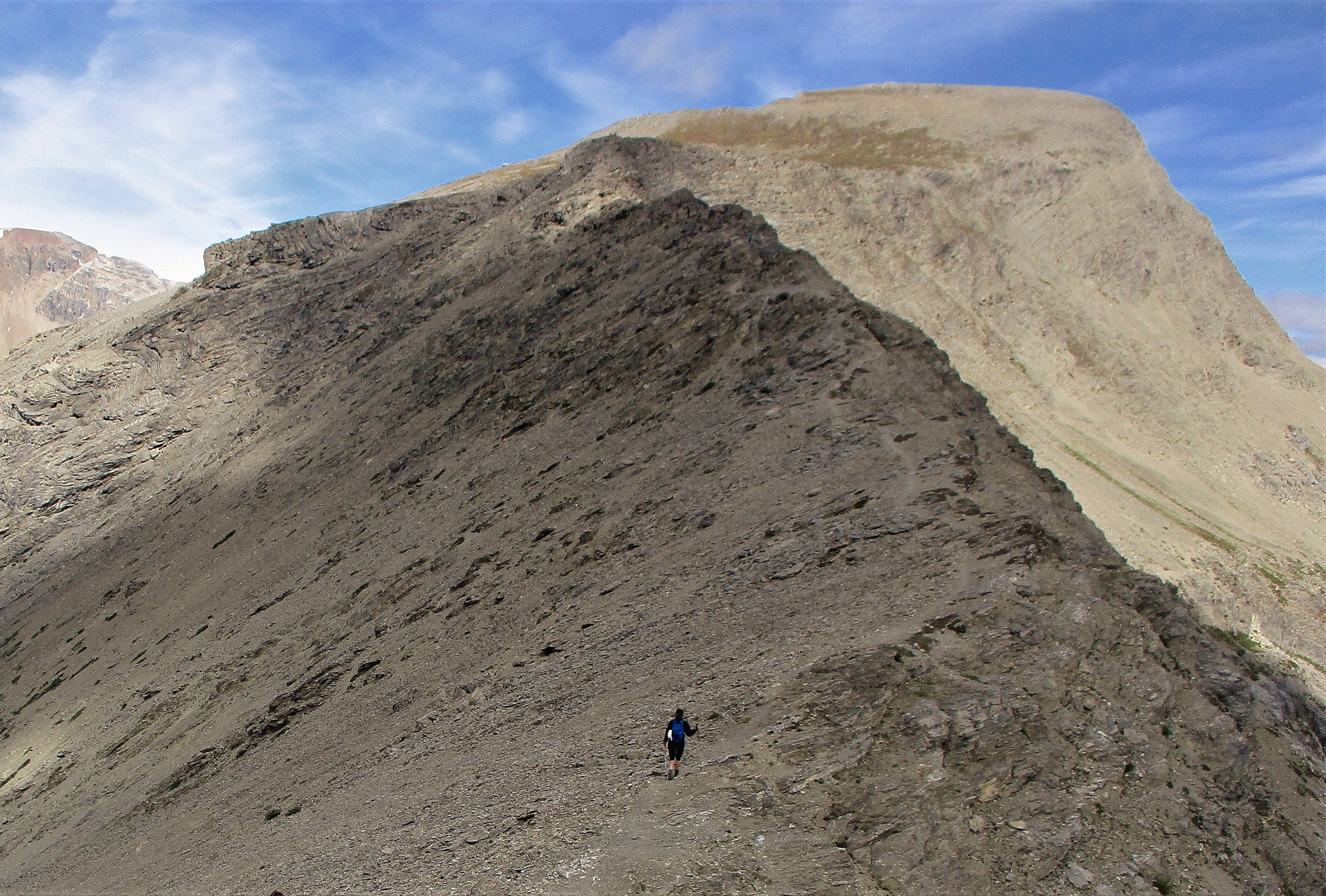
Hiking up Nub Peak

== See also ==
- Geography of British Columbia
- Geology of British Columbia
