= The Marshall =

Mountain in the country of Canada

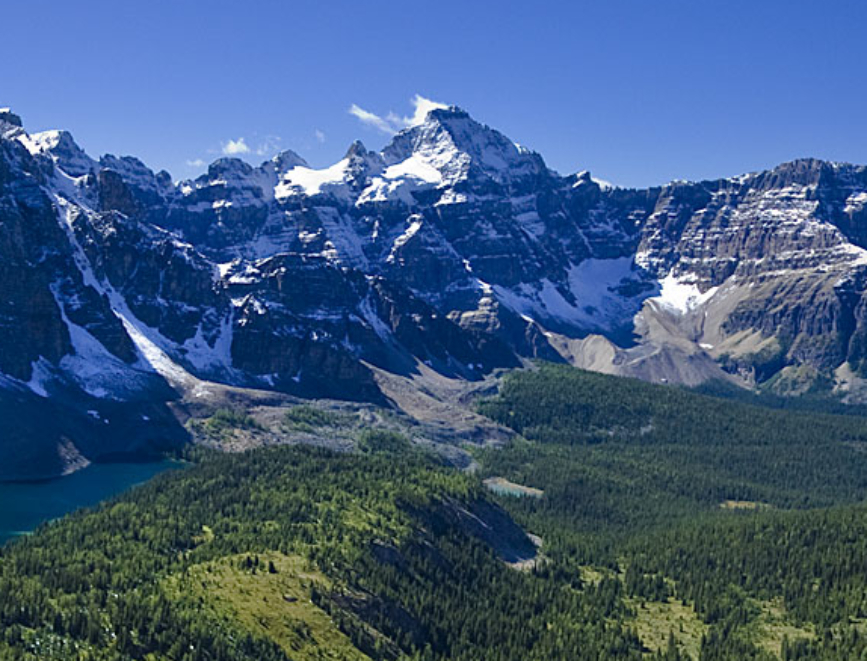
- The Marshall seen from Nub Peak

Highest point
- Elevation: 3,180 m (10,430 ft)
- Prominence: 410 m (1,350 ft)
- Parent peak: Mount Assiniboine (3616 m)
- Listing: Mountains of British Columbia
- Coordinates: 50°52′46″N 115°41′37″W

Geography
- Location within British Columbia Location within Canada
- Interactive map of The Marshall
- Country: Canada
- Province: British Columbia
- District: Kootenay Land District
- Protected area: Mount Assiniboine Provincial Park
- Parent range: Park Ranges ← Canadian Rockies
- Topo map: NTS 82J13 Mount Assiniboine

Geology
- Rock age: Cambrian
- Rock type: sedimentary rock

Climbing
- First ascent: 1919 V.A. Fynn, Rudolph Aemmer
- Easiest route: Scramble

The Marshall is a 3,180-metre (10,430-foot) mountain summit located in Mount Assiniboine Provincial Park, in the Canadian Rockies of British Columbia, Canada. Its nearest higher peak is Mount Assiniboine, 3.0 km (1.9 mi) to the east-southeast. The mountain is situated west of Wedgwood Peak.

== History ==
The mountain was named in 1913 by the Interprovincial Boundary Survey due to its "leading" position. It was alternately known as Centurion Peak since "centurion" was a Roman commanding officer, synonymous with "Field marshal", a commander of military forces.

The first ascent of The Marshall was made in 1919 by Val Fynn with Rudolph Aemmer as guide.

The mountain's name was officially adopted March 31, 1924, by the Geographical Names Board of Canada.

== Geology ==
The Marshall is composed of sedimentary rock laid down during the Cambrian period. Formed in shallow seas, this sedimentary rock was pushed east and over the top of younger rock during the Laramide orogeny.

== Climate ==
Based on the Köppen climate classification, The Marshall is located in a subarctic climate zone with cold, snowy winters, and mild summers. Temperatures can drop below −20 °C with wind chill factors below −30 °C. Precipitation runoff from The Marshall drains into tributaries of the Mitchell River.

== Gallery ==
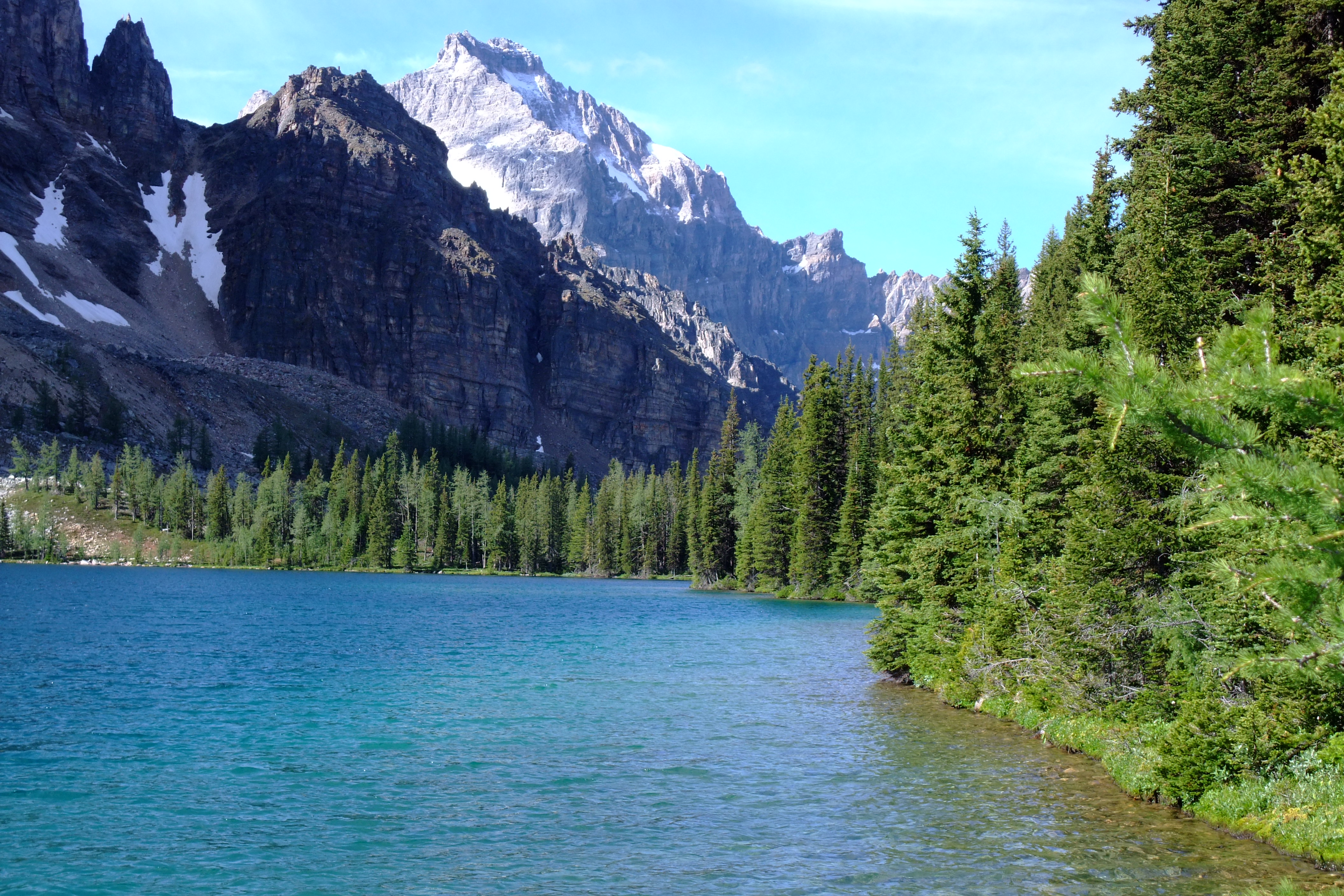
The Marshall from Cerulean Lake

== See also ==
- Geography of British Columbia
- Geology of British Columbia
