= Octopus Mountain =

Mountain in British Columbia, Canada

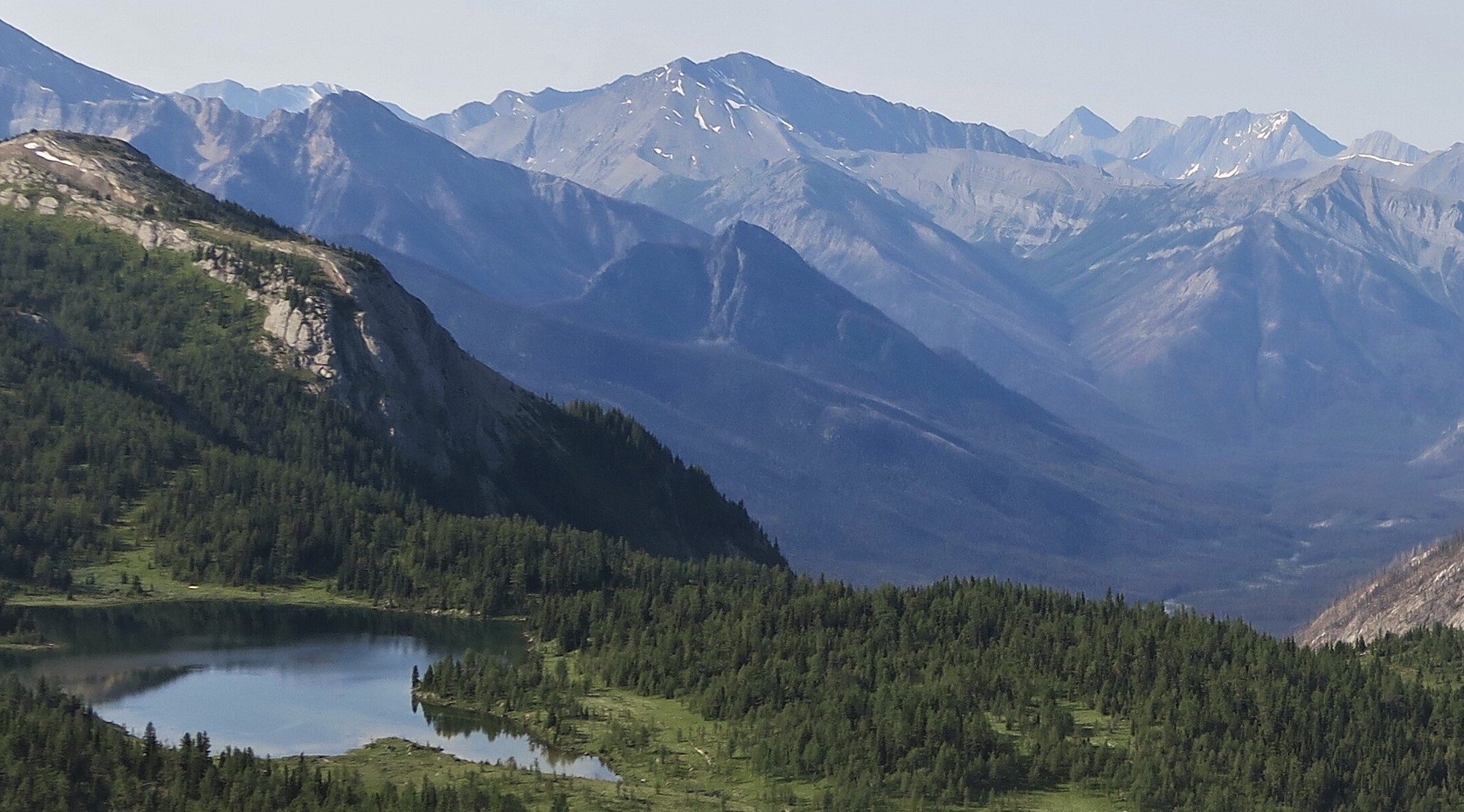
- North aspect, centered at top

Highest point
- Elevation: 2,932 m (9,619 ft)
- Prominence: 570 m (1,870 ft)
- Parent peak: Indian Peak (2,992 m)
- Listing: Mountains of British Columbia
- Coordinates: 50°54′27″N 115°48′34″W

Geography
- Location within British Columbia Location within Canada
- Interactive map of Octopus Mountain
- Country: Canada
- Province: British Columbia
- District: Kootenay Land District
- Protected area: Mount Assiniboine Provincial Park
- Parent range: Mitchell Range; Canadian Rockies
- Topo map: NTS 82J13 Mount Assiniboine

Geology
- Rock age: Cambrian
- Rock type: Sedimentary rock

Octopus Mountain is a 2,932-metre (9,619-foot) mountain summit located in Mount Assiniboine Provincial Park of British Columbia, Canada.

== Description ==
Octopus Mountain is situated 12 km (7.5 mi) west of the Continental Divide and is part of the Mitchell Range which is a sub-range of the Canadian Rockies. Precipitation runoff from the peak's southeast slope drains into the Mitchell River and all other slopes drain into tributaries of the Simpson River. Topographic relief is modest as the summit rises 1,330 m (4,360 ft) above Lachine Creek in 3 km (1.9 mi) and 1,300 m (4,300 ft) above the Mitchell River in 4 km (2.5 mi).

== History ==
The mountain was named in 1913 by surveyor Robert Daniel McCaw (1884–1941) but the reason for the name is unknown. The mountain's toponym was officially adopted on September 9, 1924, by the Geographical Names Board of Canada. A forest fire burned the slopes of Octopus Mountain in 2012 and consumed 932 hectares of land.

== Geology ==
Octopus Mountain is composed of sedimentary rock laid down during the Precambrian to Jurassic periods. Formed in shallow seas, this sedimentary rock was pushed east and over the top of younger rock during the Laramide orogeny.

== Climate ==
Based on the Köppen climate classification, Octopus Mountain is located in a subarctic climate zone with cold, snowy winters, and mild summers. Winter temperatures can drop below −20 °C with wind chill factors below −30 °C.

== See also ==
- Geography of British Columbia
