= The Towers (Canada) =

Mountain in the country of Canada

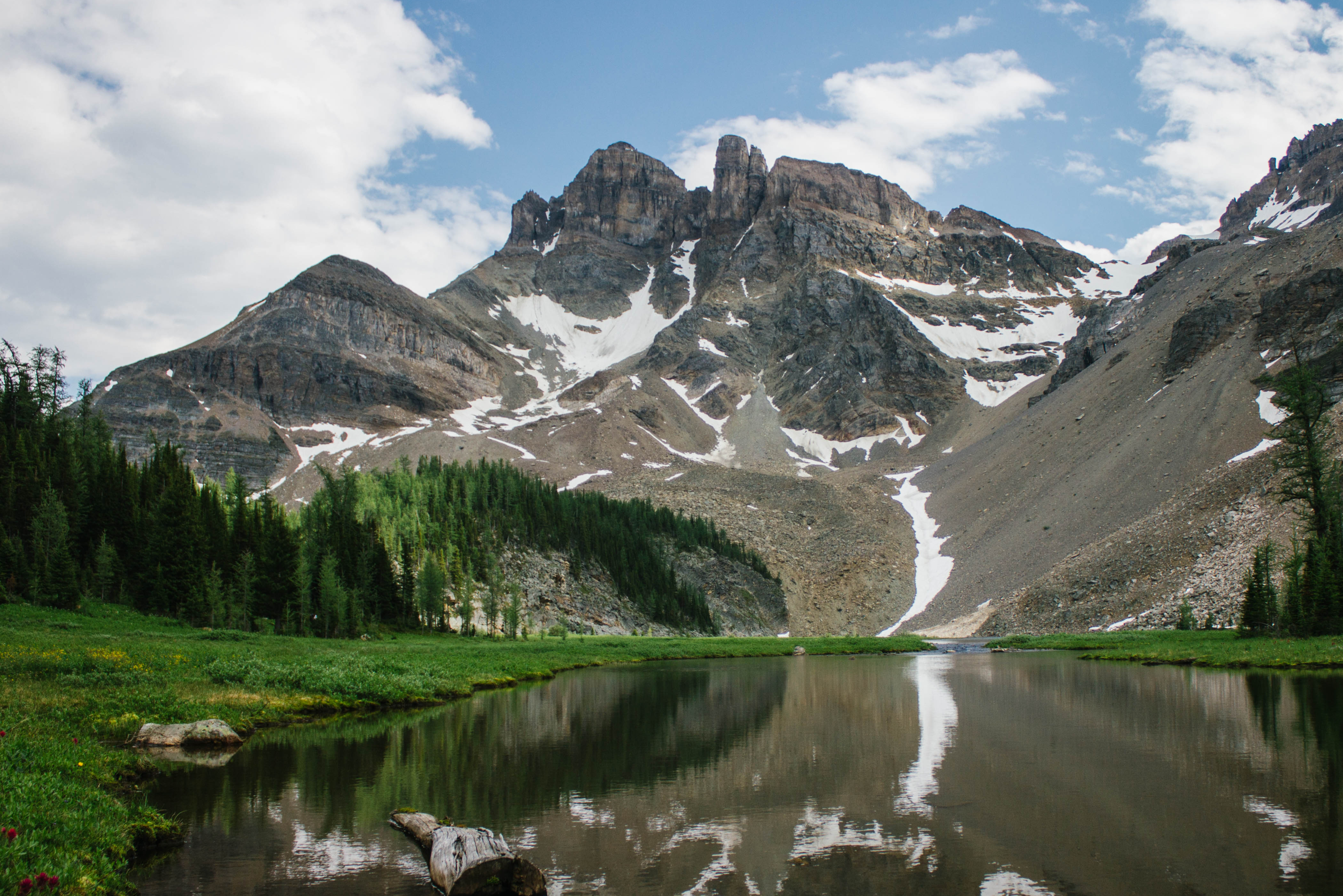
- The Towers seen from a pond near Gog Lake

Highest point
- Elevation: 2,842 m (9,324 ft)
- Prominence: 189 m (620 ft)
- Listing: Mountains of Alberta; Mountains of British Columbia
- Coordinates: 50°53′11″N 115°36′06″W

Geography
- Location within Alberta Location within British Columbia Location within Canada
- Country: Canada
- Provinces: Alberta and British Columbia
- Parent range: Canadian Rockies
- Topo map: NTS 82J13 Mount Assiniboine

Climbing
- First ascent: 1916 Interprovincial Boundary Commission

The Towers is a 2,842-metre (9,324-foot) mountain located on the border of Alberta and British Columbia on the Continental Divide. It also straddles the shared boundary of Banff National Park with Mount Assiniboine Provincial Park. It was named in 1917 by Arthur O. Wheeler. Its nearest higher peak is Mount Magog, 2.5 km (1.6 mi) to the west.

== Geology ==
The Towers is composed of sedimentary rock laid down from the Precambrian to Jurassic periods. Formed in shallow seas, this sedimentary rock was pushed east and over the top of younger rock during the Laramide orogeny.

== Climate ==
Based on the Köppen climate classification, The Towers is located in a subarctic climate with cold, snowy winters, and mild summers. Temperatures can drop below -20 °C with wind chill factors below -30 °C.

== See also ==
- List of peaks on the Alberta–British Columbia border
