= Indian Peak =

Mountain in the country of Canada

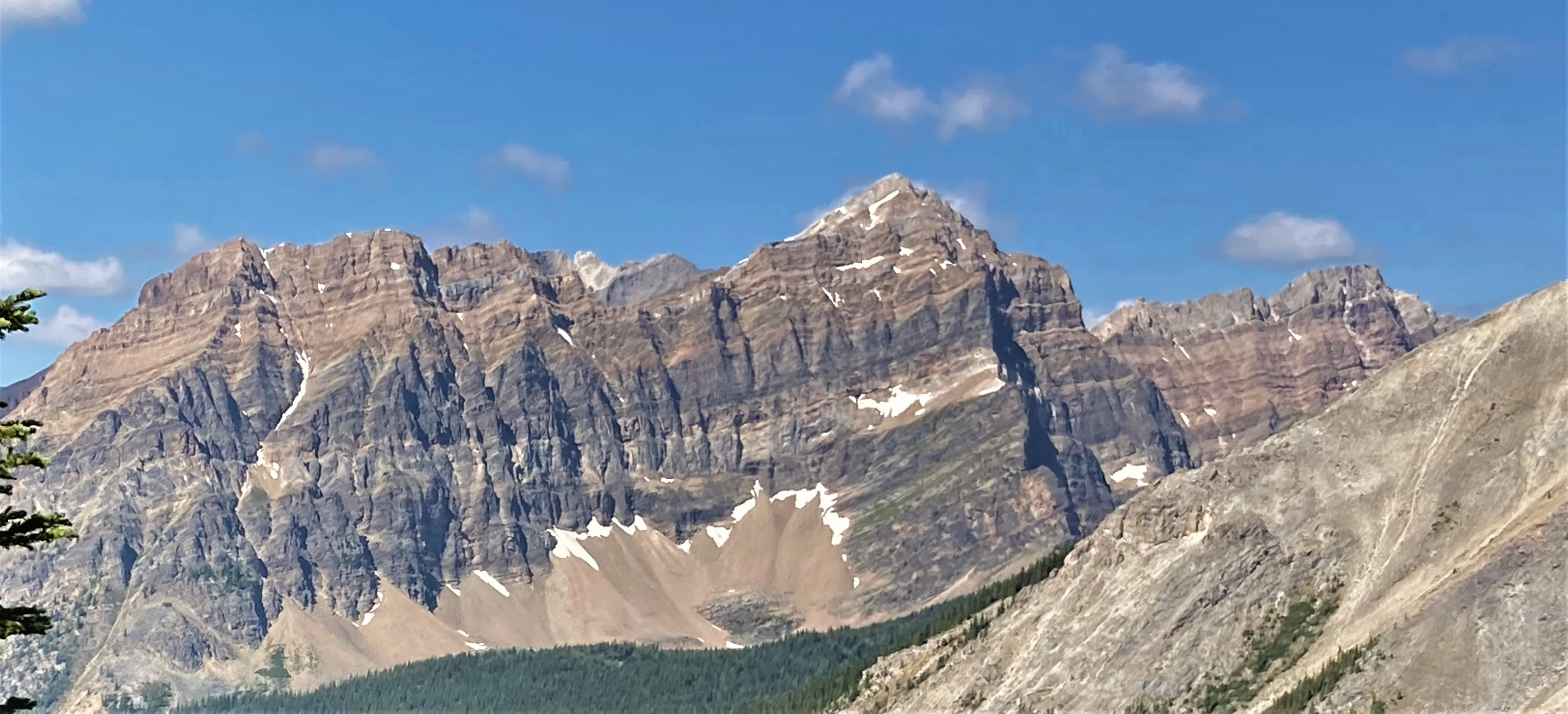
- East aspect

Highest point
- Elevation: 2,992 m (9,816 ft)
- Prominence: 764 m (2,507 ft)
- Parent peak: Mount Assiniboine (3,618 m)
- Isolation: 6.6 km (4.1 mi)
- Listing: Mountains of British Columbia
- Coordinates: 50°55′48″N 115°45′01″W

Geography
- Location within British Columbia Location within Canada
- Interactive map of Indian Peak
- Country: Canada
- Province: British Columbia
- District: Kootenay Land District
- Protected area: Mount Assiniboine Provincial Park
- Parent range: Mitchell Range; Canadian Rockies
- Topo map: NTS 82J13 Mount Assiniboine

Geology
- Rock age: Cambrian
- Rock type: sedimentary rock

Climbing
- First ascent: 1912

Indian Peak is a 2,992-metre (9,816-foot) mountain summit located in Mount Assiniboine Provincial Park of British Columbia, Canada.

== Description ==
Indian Peak is situated 10 km (6.2 mi) west of the Continental Divide and is the highest point in the Mitchell Range which is a sub-range of the Canadian Rockies. Precipitation runoff from the peak's north slope flows into headwaters of Surprise Creek and the west slope is drained by Indian Creek which are both tributaries of the Simpson River. The south slope drains into the Mitchell River. Topographic relief is significant as the summit rises 1,300 metres (4,265 ft) above the Mitchell River in 3 km (1.9 mi) and 1,200 metres (3,937 ft) above Indian Creek in 3 km (1.9 mi). Indian Peak rises immediately west of Ferro Pass, and Nestor Peak is 3.2 km (2.0 mi) to the northeast on the opposite side of the pass.

== History ==
The first ascent of the summit was made in 1912 by Robert Daniel McCaw (1884–1941). The mountain was named in 1912 as the peak resembled the head of an Indian with a headdress. The mountain's toponym was officially adopted on March 31, 1924, by the Geographical Names Board of Canada.

== Geology ==
Indian Peak is composed of sedimentary rock laid down during the Precambrian to Jurassic periods. Formed in shallow seas, this sedimentary rock was pushed east and over the top of younger rock during the Laramide orogeny.

== Climate ==
Based on the Köppen climate classification, Indian Peak is located in a subarctic climate zone with cold, snowy winters, and mild summers. Winter temperatures can drop below −20 °C (−4 °F) with wind chill factors below −30 °C (−22 °F).

== Gallery ==
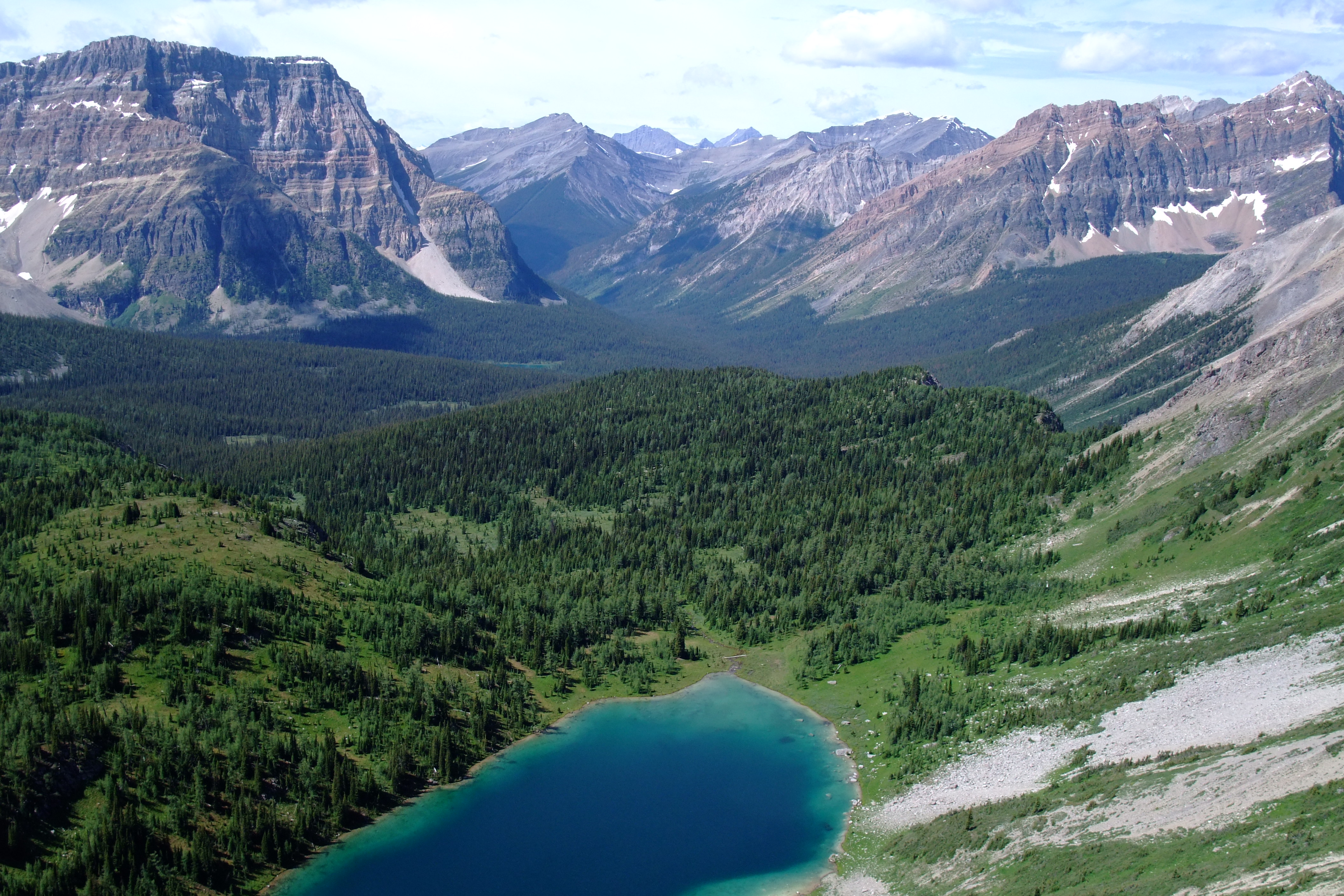
Mount Watson left, Indian Peak upper right

== See also ==
- Geography of British Columbia
