= Wedgwood Peak =

Mountain in the country of Canada

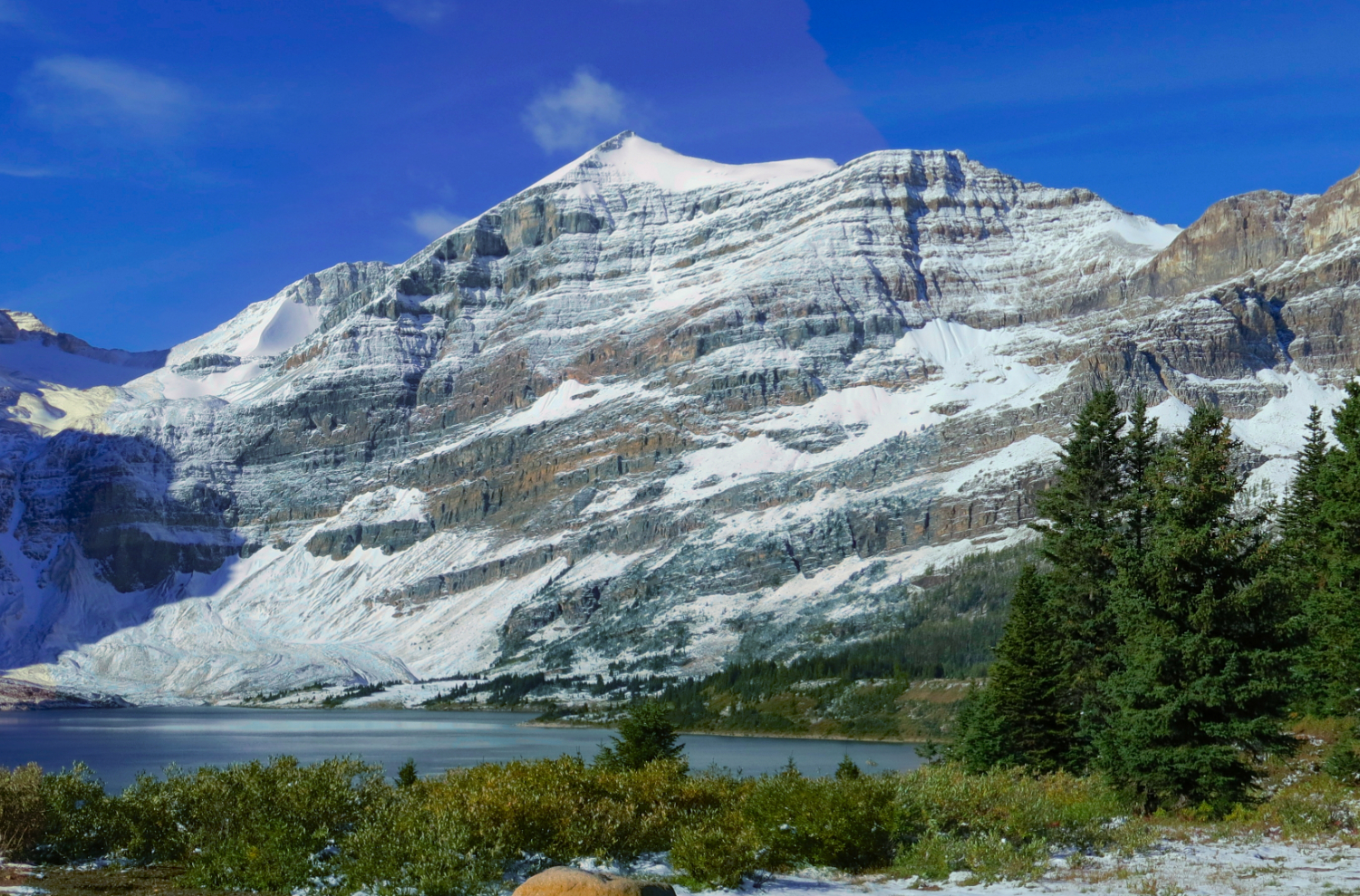
- Wedgwood Peak

Highest point
- Elevation: 3,024 m (9,921 ft)
- Prominence: 214 m (702 ft)
- Parent peak: Mount Assiniboine (3616 m)
- Listing: Mountains of British Columbia
- Coordinates: 50°53′21″N 115°39′36″W

Geography
- Location within British Columbia Location within Canada
- Interactive map of Wedgwood Peak
- Country: Canada
- Province: British Columbia
- Protected area: Mount Assiniboine Provincial Park
- Parent range: Park Ranges ← Canadian Rockies
- Topo map: NTS 82J13 Mount Assiniboine

Geology
- Rock age: Cambrian
- Rock type: sedimentary rock

Climbing
- First ascent: 1910 T.G. Longstaff, Katherine Longstaff, Rudolph Aemmer

Wedgwood Peak is a 3,024-metre (9,921-foot) mountain summit located in Mount Assiniboine Provincial Park, in the Canadian Rockies of British Columbia, Canada. Its nearest higher peak is Mount Assiniboine, 2.0 km (1.2 mi) to the south. The mountain is situated southwest of Lake Magog and 2 km (1.2 mi) south of Sunburst Peaks. Precipitation runoff from Wedgwood Peak drains east into Lake Magog, or west into Wedgwood Creek which is a tributary of the Mitchell River.

== History ==
The first ascent of Wedgwood Peak was made in 1910 by Katherine Longstaff and her brother Dr. Tom George Longstaff, with Rudolph Aemmer as their guide.

The mountain was named in 1918 by Katherine Longstaff Wedgwood for Arthur Felix Wedgwood (1877–1917), her late husband who was killed in World War I. Arthur Felix Wedgwood was also a fifth-generation descendant of Josiah Wedgwood.

First recognized as Mount Wedgwood in 1924, the mountain's present name Wedgwood Peak became official on March 31, 1966 when approved by the Geographical Names Board of Canada.

== Geology ==
Wedgwood Peak is composed of sedimentary rock laid down during the Cambrian period. Formed in shallow seas, this sedimentary rock was pushed east and over the top of younger rock during the Laramide orogeny.

== Climate ==
Based on the Köppen climate classification, Wedgwood Peak is located in a subarctic climate zone with cold, snowy winters, and mild summers. Winter temperatures can drop below −20 °C with wind chill factors below −30 °C.

== Gallery ==
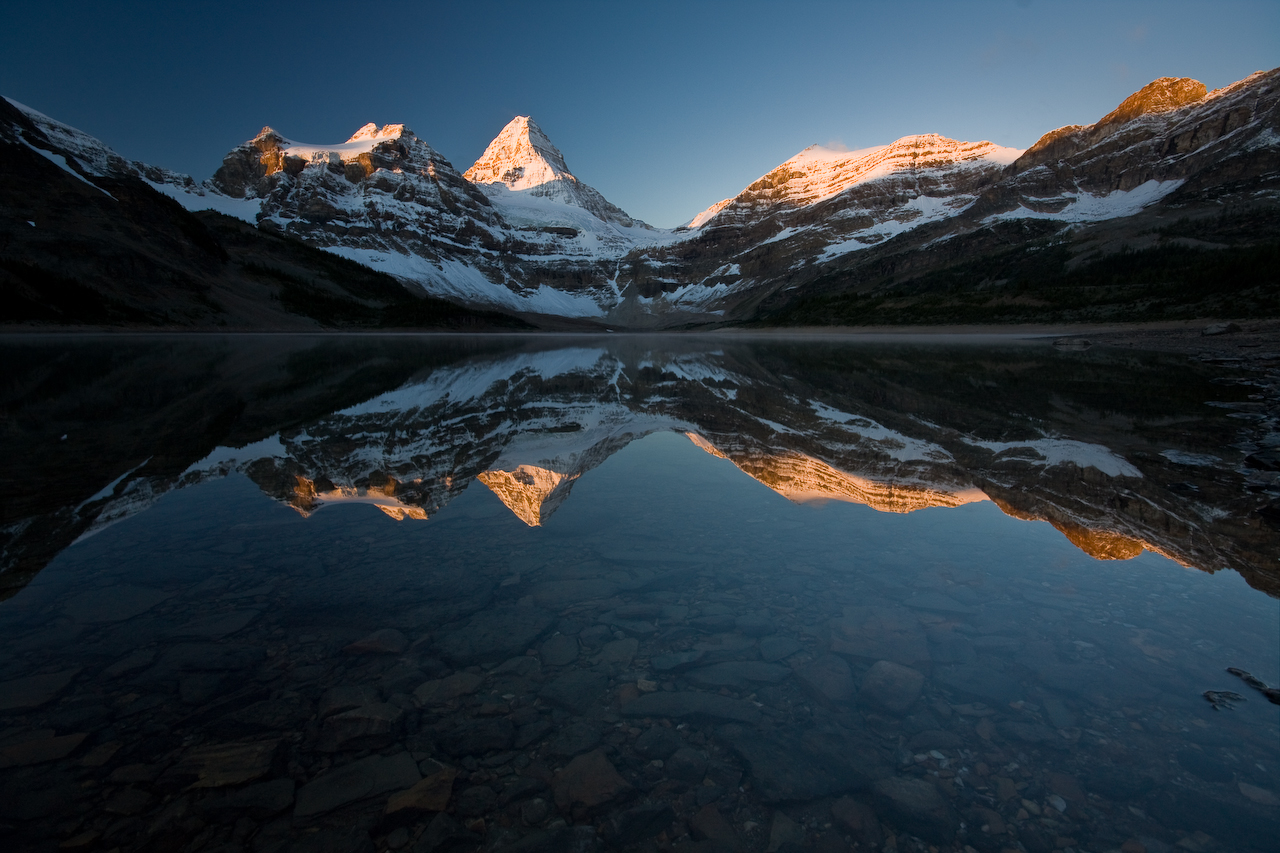
Lake Magog reflections of Mount Magog (left), Mt. Assiniboine (center), Wedgwood Peak (right)

== See also ==
- Geography of British Columbia
- Geology of British Columbia
