= Assiniboine (disambiguation) =

The Assiniboine are a Native American/First Nations people. Assiniboine may also refer to:

- Assiniboine language, one of the Siouan languages

Places

- Assiniboine River, a river that runs through the prairies of Western Canada in Saskatchewan and Manitoba
- Mount Assiniboine in eastern British Columbia, Canada
- Fort Assiniboine, Alberta, Canada
- Fort Assinniboine, Montana, U.S.
- Winnipeg—Assiniboine, a former Canadian federal electoral district
- Mount Assiniboine Provincial Park, a provincial park in British Columbia, Canada, located around Mount Assiniboine.

Ships

- HMCS Assiniboine (I18), River-class destroyer, served 1939–1945
- HMCS Assiniboine (DDH 234), St. Laurent-class destroyer, served 1956–1988

Schools

- Assiniboine Community College, community college in Manitoba, Canada

Other

- Assiniboine Herald, one of the heralds at the Canadian Heraldic Authority
