= Terrapin Mountain =

Mountain in Alberta and British Columbia, Canada

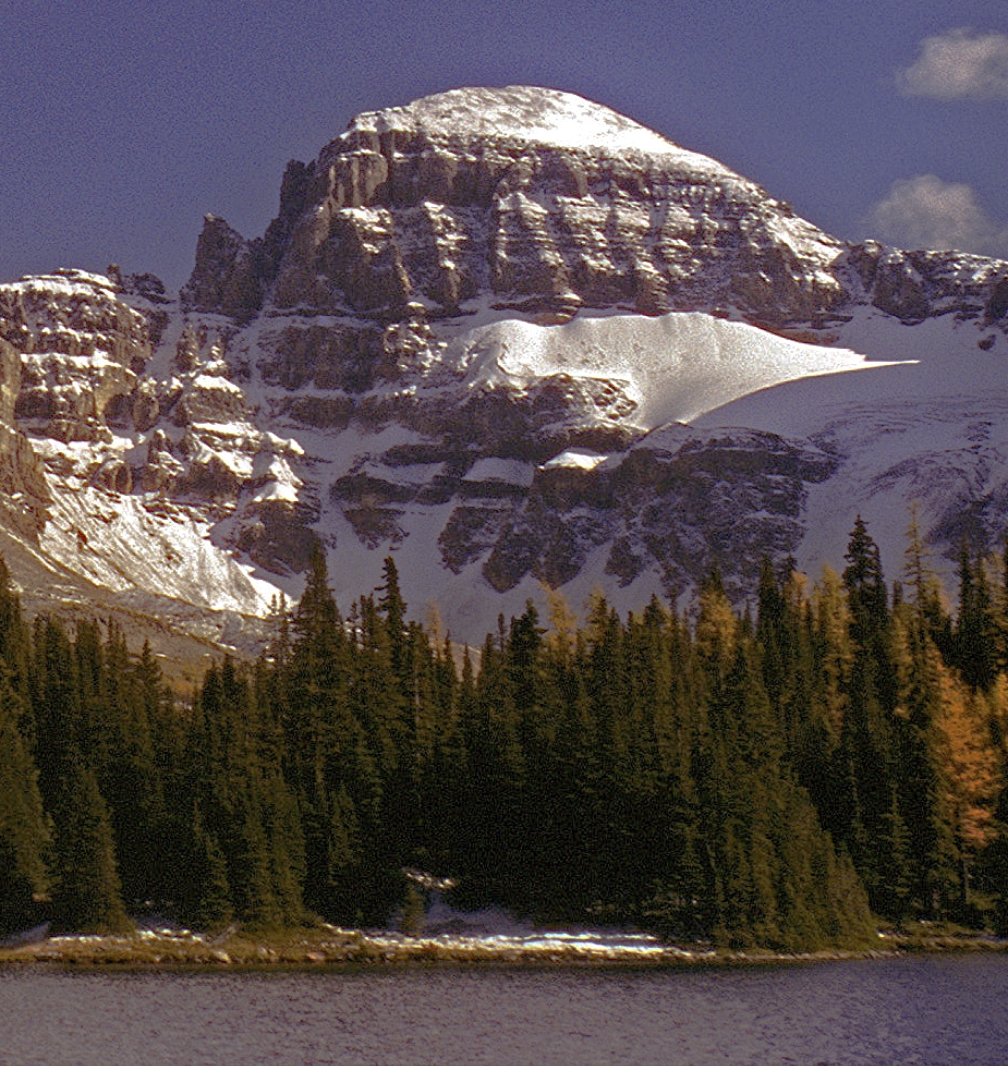

Highest point
- Elevation: 2,954 m (9,692 ft)
- Prominence: 235 m (771 ft)
- Listing: Mountains of Alberta; Mountains of British Columbia
- Coordinates: 50°52′48″N 115°37′03″W

Geography
- Location within Alberta Location within British Columbia Location within Canada
- Country: Canada
- Provinces: Alberta and British Columbia
- District: Kootenay Land District
- Topo map: NTS 82J13 Mount Assiniboine

Climbing
- First ascent: 1915 H.O. Frind, L. Jeffers, Conrad Kain

Terrapin Mountain is located southeast of Lake Magog in Mount Assiniboine Provincial Park and straddles the Continental Divide marking the Alberta-British Columbia border. It was named in 1918 for its resemblance to a turtle. A ridge extending north from the mountain terminates at Naiset Point.

== Climate ==
Based on the Köppen climate classification, Terrapin Mountain is located in a subarctic climate with cold, snowy winters, and mild summers. Temperatures can drop below −20 °C with wind chill factors below −30 °C.

== See also ==
- List of peaks on the Alberta–British Columbia border
