= Katharine Longstaff Wedgwood =

English mountain climber (1880–1976)

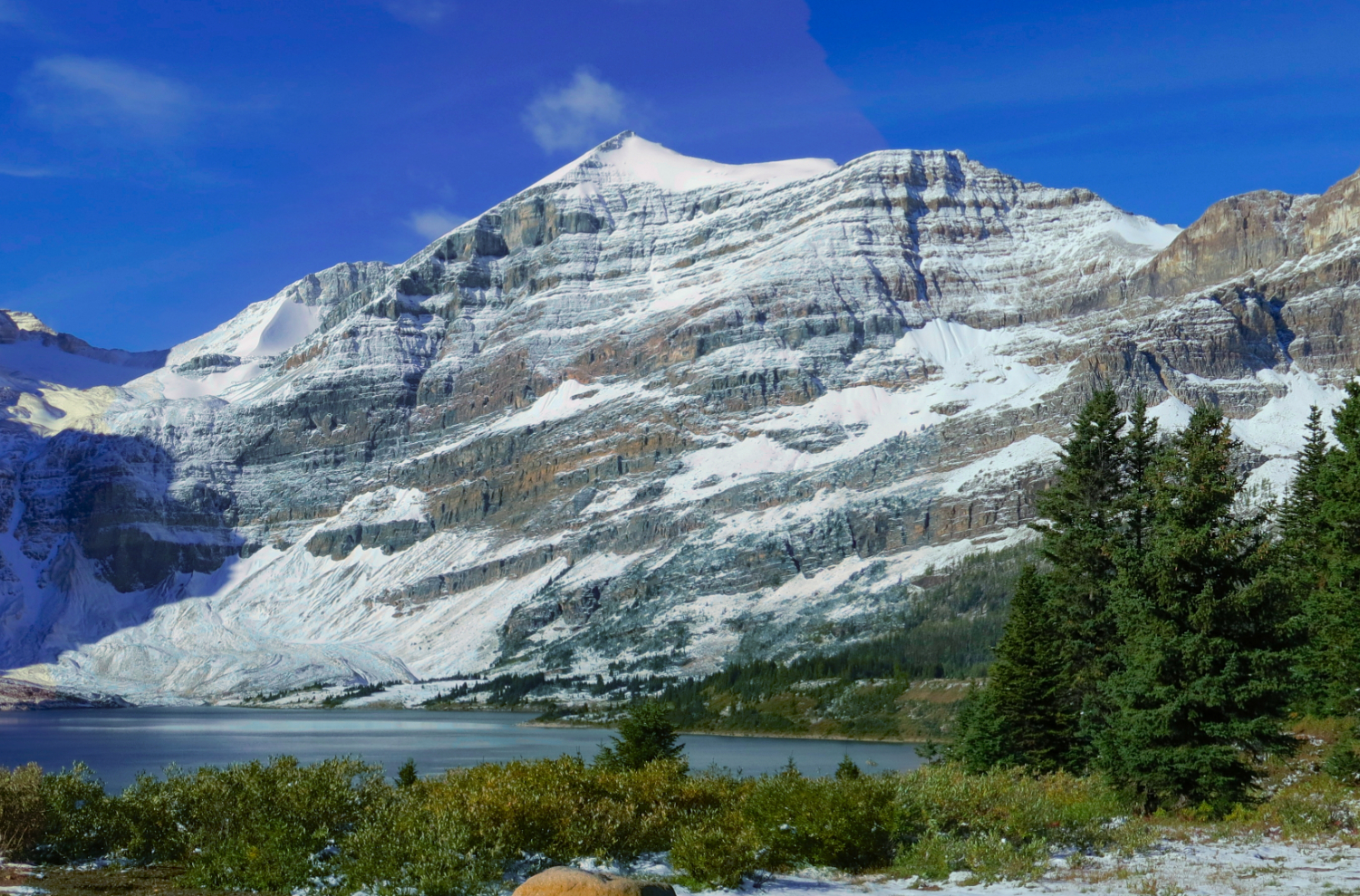
Wedgwood Peak, Katharine's namesake

Katharine Longstaff Wedgwood (also Katherine, 1880–1976) was an English mountain-climber. Her party completed the first ascent of Wedgwood Peak in the Rocky Mountains, which is named after her.

== Climbing ==
Katharine was the daughter of Lieutenant-Colonel Llewellyn Wood Longstaff, who funded the Discovery Expedition.

Her brothers, Tom and Frederick Longstaff, were also mountain-climbers. Katharine and her older brother Tom Longstaff went on several climbing expeditions together. In June 1910, Tom, Katharine and the Swiss guide Rudolph Aemmer travelled to Mount Assiniboine before the Alpine Club of Canada camp, where they met Felix Wedgwood, who warned them that the mountain conditions were bad. A few days later, the party instead climbed Wedgwood Peak. The party named the peak Katharine, but they were informed that this name had already been taken by Katherine Lake near Dolomite Pass. Katharine suggested naming the peak after Felix Wedgwood after spending the Alpine Club camp with him. Katharine and Tom Longstaff received the second and third badges awarded by the Canadian Alpine Club.

In 1924 Katharine became an honorary member of the Royal Geographical Society.

In 1929–31 she served as President of the Ladies' Alpine Club.

== Personal life ==
Katharine married Felix Wedgwood on 20 April 1911 in Wimbledon. He was killed in action in World War I in 1917. They had a son and two daughters, one of whom also became a mountain-climber.
