= Felix Wedgwood =

English author, mountaineer and soldier

- Born: 18 July 1877; Barlaston, Staffordshire, England
- Died: 14 March 1917 (aged 39); Bucquoy, Bapaume, Pas-de-Calais, France
- Education: Newcastle-under-Lyme School; Clifton College; Trinity College, Cambridge; Cambridge University
- Occupations: Author, Mountaineer, Soldier

Arthur Felix Wedgwood (18 July 1877 – 14 March 1917) was an English author, mountaineer and soldier who died on active service during the First World War.

== Background ==
He was born at The Upper House in Barlaston, Staffordshire, a scion of the Wedgwood pottery family. He was the youngest son of Clement Wedgwood and his wife Emily Catherine (née Rendel) daughter of James Meadows Rendel. His elder brothers who survived childhood were Francis Hamilton Wedgwood, Josiah C. Wedgwood and Ralph Wedgwood.

Wedgwood was educated at Newcastle High School, Clifton College, and Trinity College, Cambridge. Felix and Ralph Wedgwood (who also attended Trinity from 1895) are mentioned in Period Piece, the childhood memoir by their second cousin Gwen Raverat (1885-1957). After university, he worked as a civil engineer specialising in the purchase and recovery of shipwrecks.

== Mountaineering travels ==
Wedgwood was an amateur mountaineer, and travelled to South America and to Canada. In 1905 he sailed from Southampton to Buenos Aires. While in Argentina with the Swiss guide Hans Kaufmann, he suffered frostbite on Aconcagua. In 1908, having travelled onto Canada, he, Joseph William Andrew Hickson, Edward Feuz, Jr and Gottfried Feuz climbed Mount Assiniboine. Although they summitted, they were assailed by a storm on the descent. In Canada, he met his future wife, Katharine Longstaff; she was the daughter of Llewellyn W. Longstaff, and sister of a fellow climber Tom Longstaff. She became president of the Ladies' Alpine Club for 1929-1931 and named Wedgwood Peak for her future husband, having been the first to summit it (in 1910).

== The Shadow of a Titan ==
He published in his only novel in 1910 during "a period when novels in Britain were produced more cheaply, and read more widely, than ever before", entitled The Shadow of a Titan, in the adventure genre. The work echoes themes from Wedgwood's life, albeit with added drama. The main protagonist of the novel is "Maurice Noonan", a Cambridge undergraduate, who is the heir of his uncle "Major Tom Waring", a retired British Army officer and minor landowner from Staffordshire. The action ranges from the Staffordshire Moorlands to the deep interior of "Bolumbia", a fictional South American country, where Maurice must overcome Bolumbia's dictator (The eponymous Titan) "Almirante don Eustauio Etrada de la Camara". The Observer described The Shadow of a Titan as "a masterpiece on a South American dictatorship which [George] Meredith might have fathered". It was also reportedly favourably reviewed in The Morning Post and by Perceval Gibbon in The Bookman.

== Marriage and children ==
Having returned to England, on 20 April 1911 in Wimbledon Felix and Katharine married. They had three children:

- Katharine Frances Wedgwood (11 July 1912 - 2004), married (1936) John Colpoys Cunningham, son of John Francis Cunningham.
- Felicity Emily Wedgwood (1 November 1913 - 2003), married (1943) John Felix Cradock Royds.
- Cecil Felix Nivelle Wedgwood (12 December 1916 — 9 September 1996).

== Military service and death ==
Wedgwood was commissioned as a second lieutenant in the 5th Bn North Staffordshire Regiment, a Territorial Force infantry unit, in 1909, and was recommissioned in 1911. The First World War began in 1914, the 1/5th Bn North Staffs landed in France at Le Havre in May 1915, forming part of the 46th (North Midland) Division which saw action at Loos and The Somme, where his cousin Major Cecil Wedgwood DSO of the 8th Bn was killed in July 1916. Felix Wedgwood had been promoted to Temporary Captain in May 1916, becoming a permanent Captain in September 1916. Captain A. F. Wedgwood died on active service in March 1917 and was buried at Rossignol Wood Cemetery in Hébuterne, Pas-de-Calais, alongside other men mostly from the North and South Staffs Regiments and New Zealand. A brief note was published in The Times. His estate was sufficient to receive notice in The London Gazette

His widow posthumously privately published another book in 1918 entitled Unpublished and Unfinished Stories. She died in 1976.

He is commemorated on the Trinity College Chapel war memorial, and within St John's Church, Barlaston.
