= Nestor Peak =

Mountain in the country of Canada

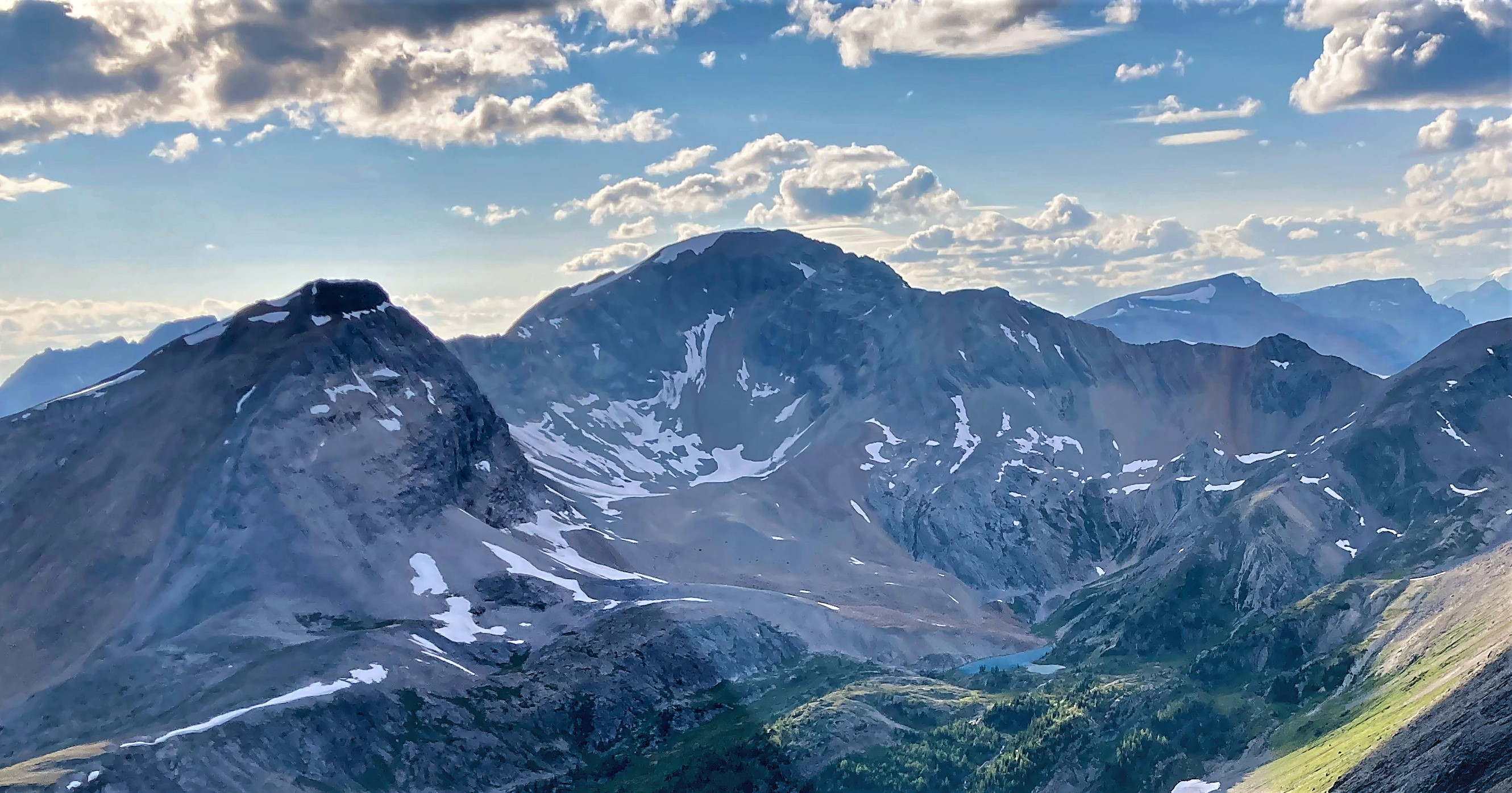
- Southeast aspect, from Nub Peak

Highest point
- Elevation: 2,972 m (9,751 ft)
- Prominence: 687 m (2,254 ft)
- Parent peak: Indian Peak (2,992 m)
- Isolation: 3.2 km (2.0 mi)
- Listing: Mountains of British Columbia
- Coordinates: 50°56′41″N 115°42′35″W

Geography
- Location within British Columbia Location within Canada
- Interactive map of Nestor Peak
- Country: Canada
- Province: British Columbia
- District: Kootenay Land District
- Protected area: Mount Assiniboine Provincial Park
- Parent range: Mitchell Range; Canadian Rockies
- Topo map: NTS 82J13 Mount Assiniboine

Geology
- Rock age: Cambrian
- Rock type: sedimentary rock

Nestor Peak is a 2,972-metre (9,751-foot) mountain summit located in Mount Assiniboine Provincial Park of British Columbia, Canada.

== Description ==
Nestor Peak is situated 7 km (4.3 mi) west of the Continental Divide in the Mitchell Range which is a sub-range of the Canadian Rockies. Precipitation runoff from the peak's north slope drains into headwaters of the Simpson River and the west slope is drained by Surprise Creek (a Simpson tributary). The south slope is drained by Ferro Creek and east slope by Nestor Creek, which are both tributaries of the Mitchell River. Topographic relief is significant as the summit rises 970 metres (3,182 ft) above the Simpson River in 2.5 km (1.6 mi) and 670 metres (2,198 ft) above Nestor Lake in 1 km (0.62 mi). Nestor Peak rises immediately northeast of Ferro Pass, and the nearest higher neighbor is Indian Peak, 3.2 km (2.0 mi) to the southwest on the opposite side of the pass.

== Etymology ==
The mountain was named in 1916 by interprovincial boundary surveyors after HMS Nestor, a destroyer sunk in the Battle of Jutland during World War I. The mountain's toponym was officially adopted on March 3, 1960, by the Geographical Names Board of Canada.

== Geology ==
Nestor Peak is composed of sedimentary rock laid down during the Precambrian to Jurassic periods. Formed in shallow seas, this sedimentary rock was pushed east and over the top of younger rock during the Laramide orogeny.

== Climate ==
Based on the Köppen climate classification, Nestor Peak is located in a subarctic climate zone with cold, snowy winters, and mild summers. Winter temperatures can drop below −20 °C with wind chill factors below −30 °C.

== See also ==
- Geography of British Columbia
- Mount Nestor (Alberta)
