= Mount Watson =

Mount Watson may refer to:

- Mount Watson (Canadian Rockies) near Mt. Assiniboine, British Columbia, Canada
- Mount Watson (Alaska) in Alaska, United States
- Mount Watson (California) in California, United States
- Mount Watson (Utah) in Utah, United States
- Mount Watson (Washington) in Washington state, United States
