= Frederick Longstaff =

Major Frederick Victor Longstaff (15 June 1879 - 1961) was an Anglo-Canadian soldier, architect, military historian and mountaineer. He was the son of Llewellyn W. Longstaff, his brother was Tom Longstaff and his sister Katherine married Felix Wedgwood.

Longstaff wrote various works, including (1917) The Book of the Machine Gun with A. Hilliard Atteridge and Esquimalt Naval Base: A History of Its Work and Its Defences (1941).
