= Mount Watson (Canadian Rockies) =

Mountain in the country of Canada

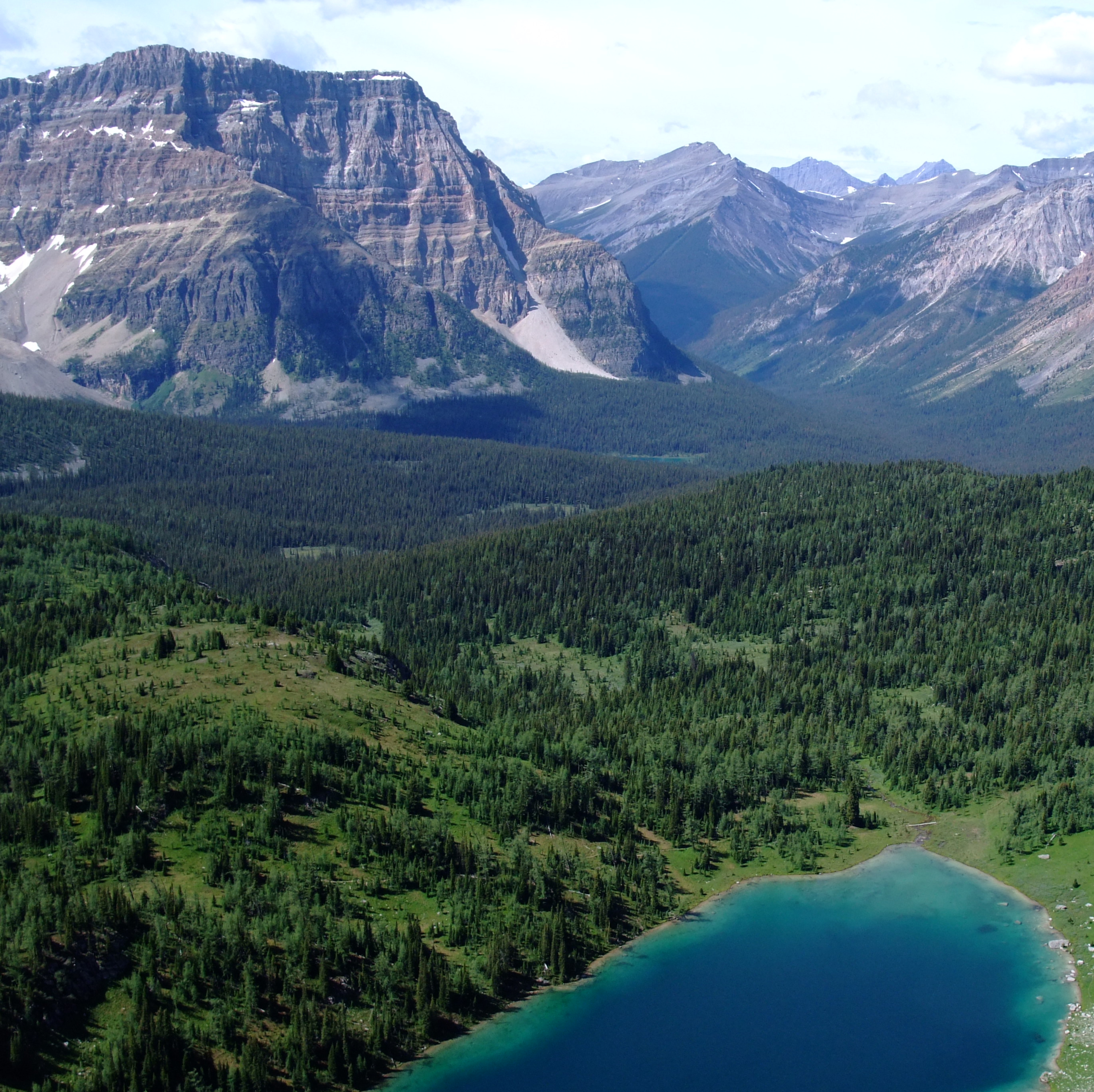
- Mount Watson upper left

Highest point
- Elevation: 2,955 m (9,695 ft)
- Prominence: 165 m (541 ft)
- Parent peak: The Marshall (3180 m)
- Listing: Mountains of British Columbia
- Coordinates: 50°53′23″N 115°42′46″W

Geography
- Location within British Columbia Location within Canada
- Interactive map of Mount Watson
- Country: Canada
- Province: British Columbia
- District: Kootenay Land District
- Protected area: Mount Assiniboine Provincial Park
- Parent range: Park Ranges; Canadian Rockies
- Topo map: NTS 82J13 Mount Assiniboine

Geology
- Rock age: Cambrian
- Rock type: sedimentary rock

Climbing
- Easiest route: Scramble

Mount Watson is a 2,955-metre (9,695-foot) mountain summit located in Mount Assiniboine Provincial Park, in the Canadian Rockies of British Columbia, Canada. The nearest higher peak is The Marshall, 2.0 km (1.2 mi) to the southeast.

== History ==
The mountain was named in 1924 after Sir David Watson (1871-1922), commander of the 4th Canadian Division during World War II. The mountain's toponym was officially adopted on March 31, 1924, by the Geographical Names Board of Canada.

== Geology ==
Mount Watson is composed of sedimentary rock laid down during the Cambrian period. Formed in shallow seas, this sedimentary rock was pushed east and over the top of younger rock during the Laramide orogeny.

== Climate ==
Based on the Köppen climate classification, Mount Watson is located in a subarctic climate zone with cold, snowy winters, and mild summers. Winter temperatures can drop below −20 °C with wind chill factors below −30 °C. Precipitation runoff from Mount Watson drains into tributaries of the Mitchell River.

== Gallery ==
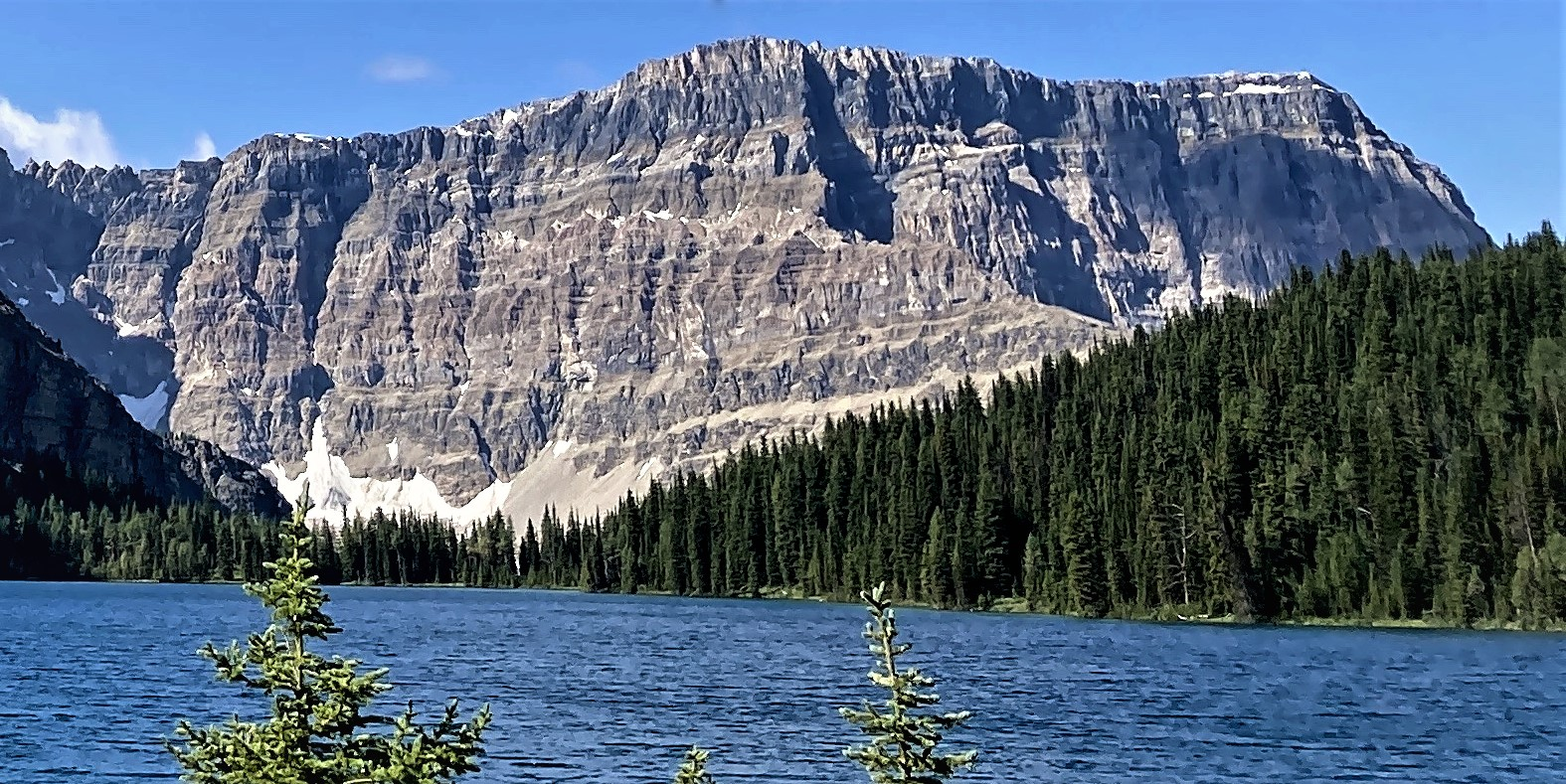
Mount Watson, northeast aspect

== See also ==
- Geography of British Columbia
- Geology of British Columbia
