= Sunburst Peaks =

Group of mountains in British Columbia, Canada

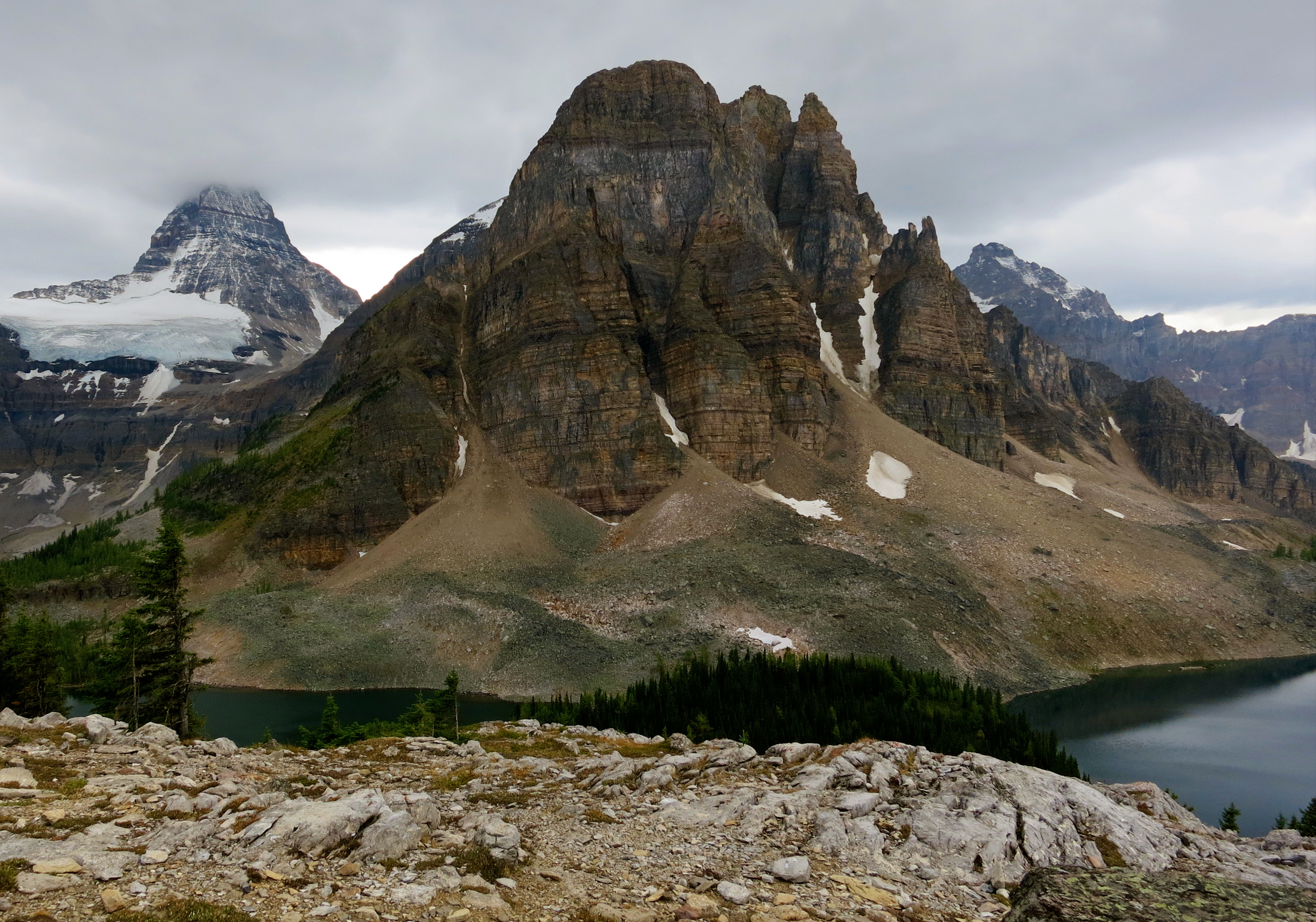
- Sunburst Peaks centered with Mt. Assiniboine behind left

Highest point
- Elevation: 2,849 m (9,347 ft)
- Prominence: 79 m (259 ft)
- Parent peak: Wedgwood Peak (3024 m)
- Listing: Mountains of British Columbia
- Coordinates: 50°54′12″N 115°39′28″W

Geography
- Location within British Columbia Location within Canada
- Interactive map of Sunburst Peaks
- Country: Canada
- Province: British Columbia
- District: Kootenay Land District
- Protected area: Mount Assiniboine Provincial Park
- Parent range: Park Ranges ← Canadian Rockies
- Topo map: NTS 82J13 Mount Assiniboine

Geology
- Rock age: Cambrian
- Rock type: sedimentary rock

Climbing
- First ascent: 1910 T.G. Longstaff, Katherine Longstaff, Rudolph Aemmer
- Easiest route: Scramble

Sunburst Peaks is a 2,849-metre (9,347-foot) mountain summit located in Mount Assiniboine Provincial Park, in the Canadian Rockies of British Columbia, Canada. Its nearest higher peak is Wedgwood Peak, 1.0 km (0.62 mi) to the south. The mountain is situated immediately southeast of Sunburst Lake, west of Lake Magog, and south of Cerulean Lake.

== History ==
The first ascent of the peak was made in 1910 by Katherine Longstaff and her brother Dr. Tom Longstaff, with Rudolph Aemmer as their guide.

The mountain was named Sunburst Peak in 1953 after Sunburst Lake, which had been named by the Interprovincial Boundary Survey. The name was officially changed by the Geographical Names Board of Canada to Sunburst Peaks (plural) on February 15, 1983 with the intention extended to apply to three peaks.

== Geology ==
Sunburst Peak is composed of sedimentary rock laid down during the Cambrian period. Formed in shallow seas, this sedimentary rock was pushed east and over the top of younger rock during the Laramide orogeny.

== Climate ==
Based on the Köppen climate classification, Sunburst Peak is located in a subarctic climate zone with cold, snowy winters, and mild summers. Temperatures can drop below −20 °C with wind chill factors below −30 °C. Precipitation runoff from the peak drains into headwaters of the Mitchell River.

== Gallery ==
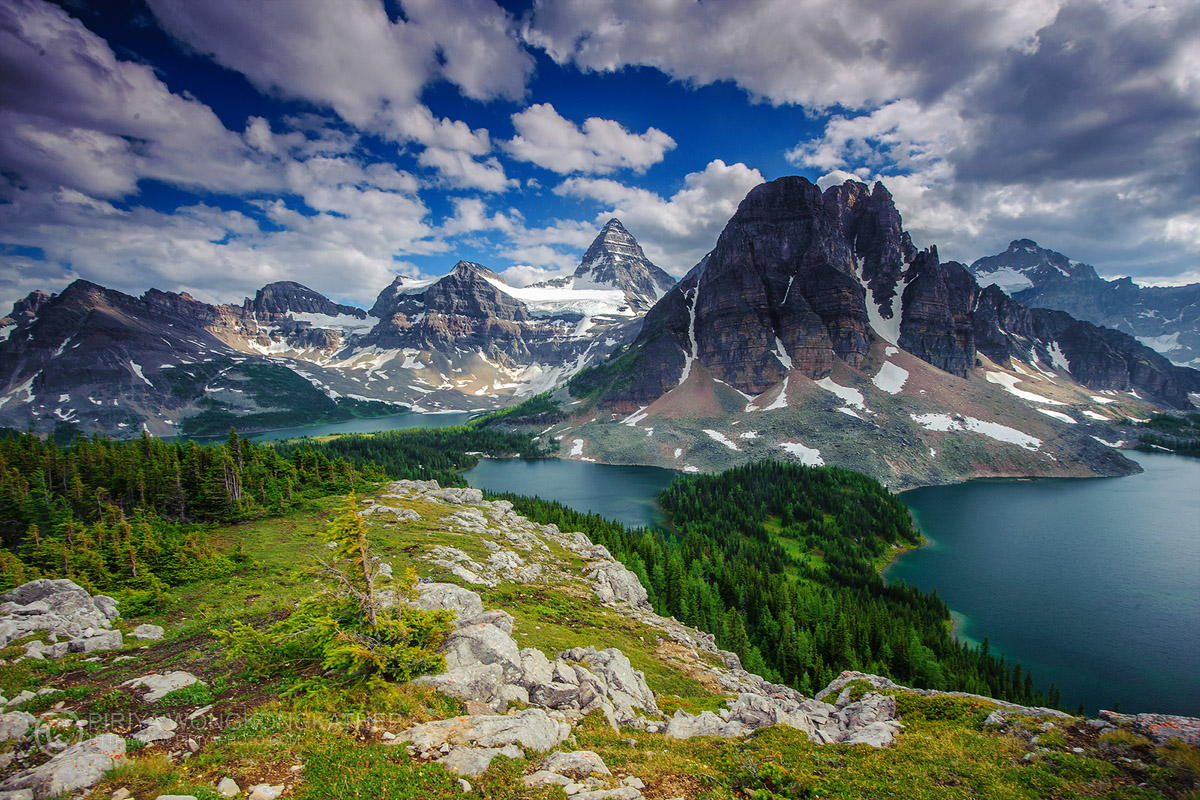
Sunburst Peak above Sunburst and Cerulean lakes

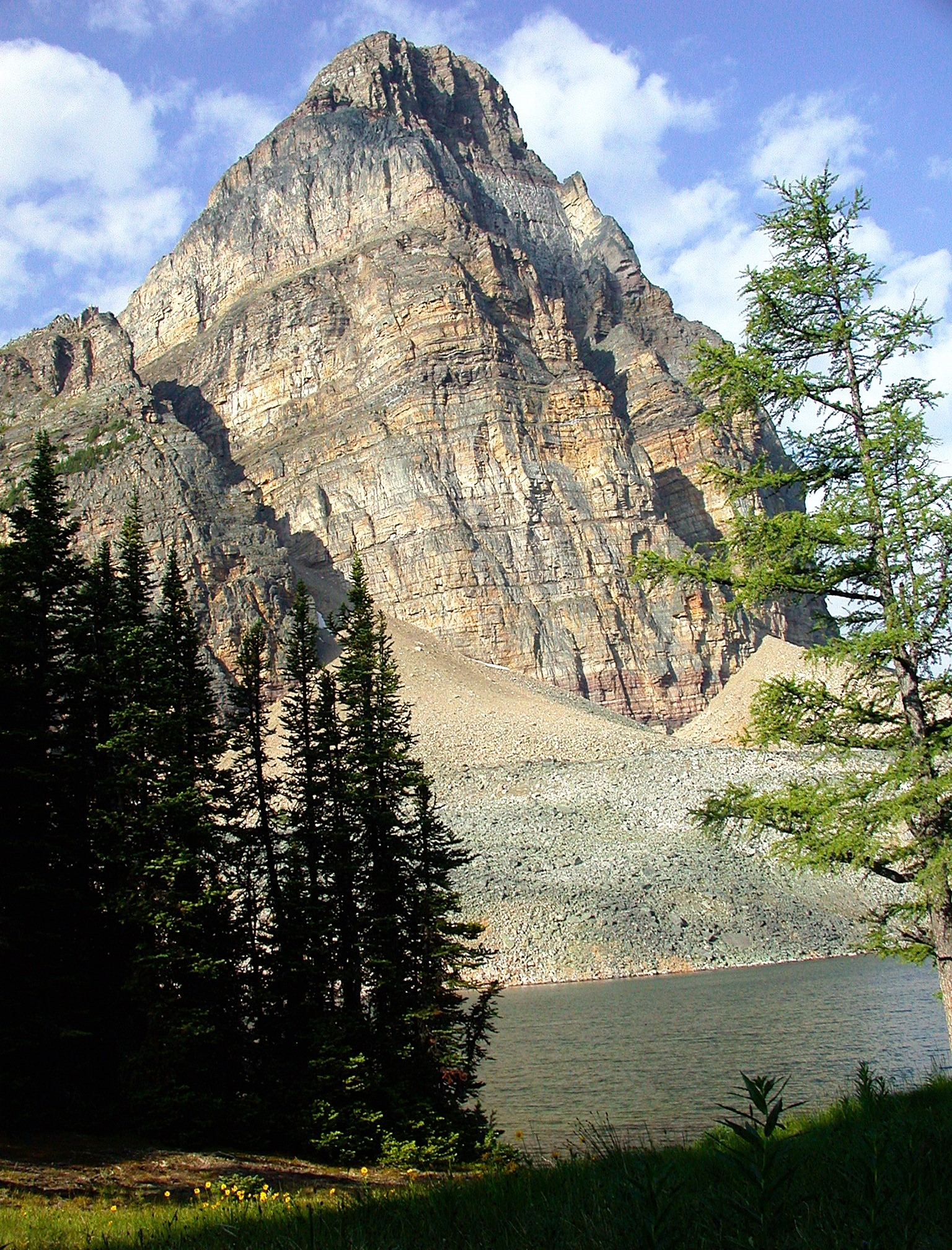
Northeast aspect rises above Sunburst Lake

== See also ==
- Geography of British Columbia
- Geology of British Columbia
