= Llewellyn W. Longstaff =

English industrialist

Lieutenant-Colonel Llewellyn Wood Longstaff OBE FRGS (23 December 1841 – 20 November 1918) was an English industrialist and fellow of the Royal Geographical Society. He is best known for being the chief private-sector patron and financial angel of the Discovery Expedition to the Antarctic.

== Antarctic patron ==
Llewellyn Longstaff was born in Wandsworth London, on 23 December 1841. In 1873, he married Marie Lydia Sawyer, with whom he had 10 children, including mountaineer Tom George Longstaff. He owned a significant equity share in Blundell Spence & Co., a £400,000 firm based in Kingston upon Hull that crushed linseed oil to manufacture oil paint. He was also a member of several nongovernmental organizations, including the Freemasons, the Hull Chamber of Commerce and Shipping, and the Royal Geographical Society (RGS).

Longstaff's Society membership coincided with the presidency of longtime RGS leader Sir Clements Markham, whose dream was to organize a British expedition to the then-unknown Antarctic continent. Markham's initial efforts to lobby for funds were met with indifference in London; but Longstaff's friendship with Markham made it possible for the impecunious expedition plans to move forward, as the industrialist pledged in 1899 to donate £25,000 sterling. The British government then promised to appropriate £40,000 as matching funds, thus creating a budget to support the construction in 1900-1901 of a ship for the expedition, RRS Discovery. The ship, partly paid for by Longstaff, would be commanded by Markham's protégé Robert Falcon Scott.

The paint manufacturer's donation gave him the standing to recommend potential expedition members to Markham. After Sir Llewellyn's son Cedric befriended a junior Union Castle merchant navy officer while their ship was heading for South Africa, young Cedric recommended his friend to Longstaff's attention. Longstaff got the sea officer, Ernest Shackleton, a crucial interview with Markham that led to his selection for the expedition. The Discovery Expedition sailed south, with Scott as commander and Shackleton as a key officer, in August 1901. The expedition members treated Longstaff in absentia as their principal patron, and in December 1902 Scott and Shackleton, in a probe southward over the Ross Ice Shelf, discovered and named the Longstaff Peaks, a mountain system in the Holland Range.

Longstaff died on 20 November 1918 in Wimbledon, London. He was posthumously appointed an Officer of the Order of the British Empire in the 1919 New Year Honours.

The Discovery, built with his donation, was preserved as a historic landmark. As of 2026 it is permanently moored in Dundee.

== Family ==
Llewelyn was the father of mountaineers Tom Longstaff, Katharine Longstaff Wedgwood and Frederick Longstaff.
