= Tom Longstaff =

British explorer (1875–1964)

Tom Longstaff FRGS
- Longstaff on 1922 Everest expedition

Personal information
- Born: 15 January 1875 Hull, England
- Died: 26 June 1964 (aged 89) Achiltibuie, Scotland
- Occupations: explorer, mountaineer, ornithologist and medical doctor
- Parent: Lieutenant-Colonel Llewellyn Longstaff (father)

Climbing career
- First ascents: Trisul, 7120m, 1907
- Known for: President of the Alpine Club (1947 to 1949); Member of the 1922 British Mount Everest expedition

Tom George Longstaff (15 January 1875 – 26 June 1964) was an English medical doctor, explorer and mountaineer, most famous for being the first person to climb a summit of over 7,000 metres in elevation, Trisul, in the India/Pakistan Himalayas in 1907. He also made important explorations and climbs in Tibet, Nepal, the Karakoram, Spitsbergen, Greenland, and Baffin Island. He was a founding member of The Alpine Ski Club in 1908 and the Himalayan Club (1929), was elected as an Honorary Member of the Climbers Club in 1932 and was its President from 1933–1935 and was president of the (British) Alpine Club from 1947 to 1949.

== Early life ==
Longstaff was the eldest son of Lt-Col. Llewellyn W. Longstaff OBE of Wimbledon, the first and most generous supporter of Captain Scott's National Antarctic Expedition. His brother was Frederick Longstaff and his sister Katherine married Felix Wedgwood, the author and mountaineer who was killed in action during the First World War. Katherine was also an active mountaineer, becoming the president of the Ladies' Alpine Club for 1929-1931.

Longstaff was educated at Eton College, Christ Church, Oxford, and St Thomas' Hospital, London.

== War service ==
Longstaff was commissioned into the 1/7th Battalion of the Hampshire Regiment in 1914 and served on the General Staff at Army Headquarters, Simla, 1915–1916. He was Assistant Commandant of the Gilgit Corps of Scouts, Frontier Militia, and Special Assistant at Fort Gupis to the Political Agent in Gilgit, from 1916, and was promoted Captain in 1917, retiring from the service in 1918.

During the Second World War, he served with the 7th and 13th Battalion of the KRRC from 1939 to 1941.

== Mountaineer ==
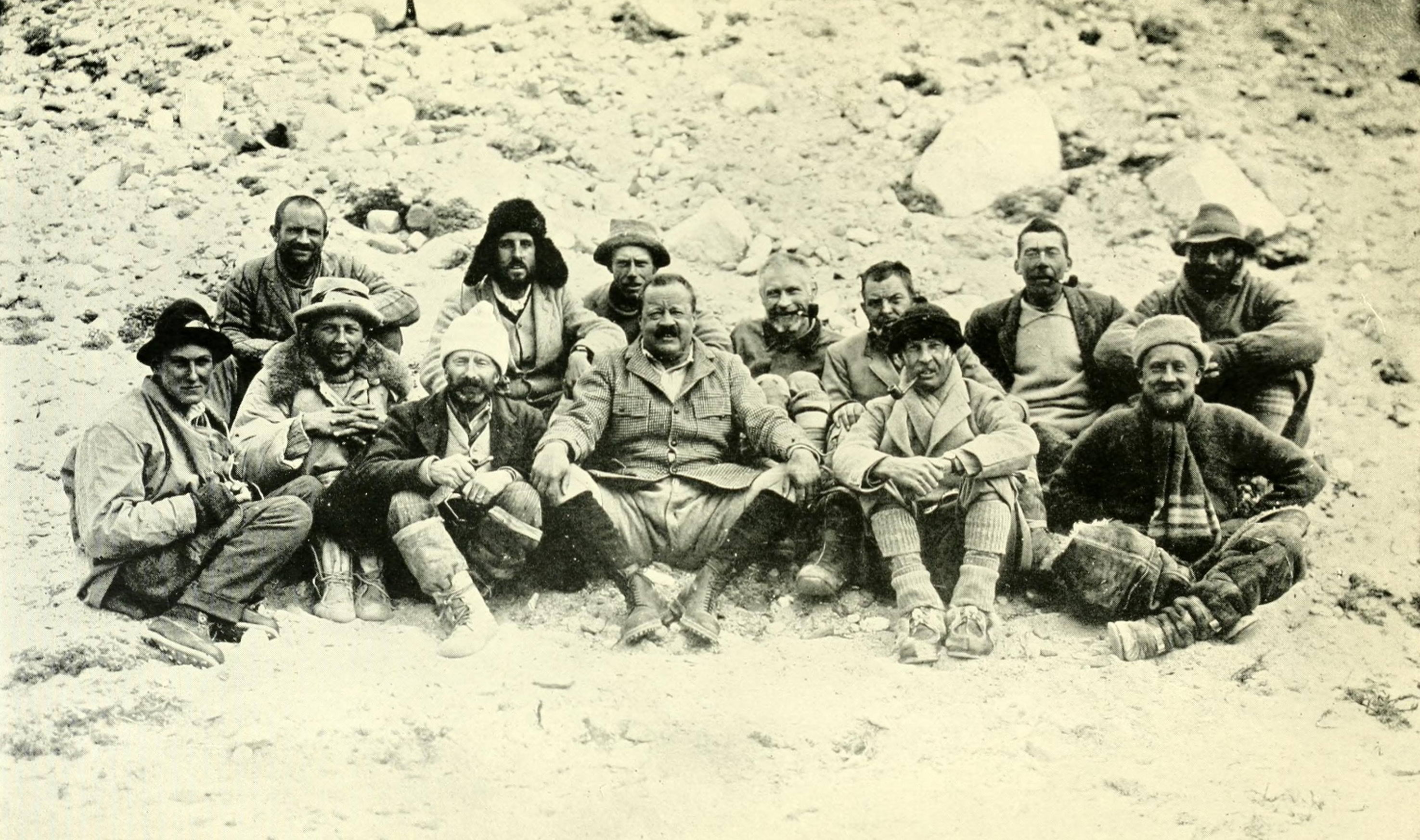
Photograph from "The assault on Mount Everest, 1922, C. G. Bruce, facing page 46 "The Expedition at base Camp." Left to right, back row: Henry Morshead, Geoffrey Bruce, John Noel, Arthur Wakefield, Howard Somervell, John Morris, Teddy Norton. Front row: George Mallory, George Finch,Tom Longstaff, Charles Bruce, Bill Strutt, Colin Crawford.

Longstaff climbed in the Alps, the Caucasus, Rocky Mountains, Greenland, Spitsbergen, Himalayas and the Selkirks (with Wheeler).

Before the Great War, he travelled in Tibet in 1905, ascended Trisul in the Himalayas in 1907, and in 1908 he was awarded the Gill Memorial by the Royal Geographical Society for his work in the Himalaya and Tibet.

He went on to explore the Siachen Glacier and, with Arthur Morris Slingsby, he discovered the peaks of Teram Kangri in 1909. Together with Slingsby from the 56th Rifles (Frontier Force) were two sepoys (soldiers), Gulab Khan and Attar Khan. Dr. Arthur Neve also joined the expedition for a few weeks. It has been written that the map he made during this journey "completely altered the topography as shown on older maps".

After the war, he took part in the 1921 Oxford University Spitsbergen expedition with Odell and was chief medical officer and naturalist on the 1922 British Mount Everest expedition. He returned to Spitsbergen in 1923 and to the Garhwal Himalaya in 1927. He led the Oxford University Expedition to Greenland in 1928 and the same year was awarded the Founder's Medal of the Royal Geographical Society for his work in the Himalaya, especially his discovery of the Siachen Glacier. In Greenland again, 1931 and 1934, and Baffin Island, 1934 with Wordie and others.

When there were difficulties financing the 1938 Everest expedition Longstaff offered to underwrite the cost - on condition that the expedition was led by either Tilman or Shipton, that there would be no advance publicity and that, where possible, the climbers would each pay their own way.

He was a well respected amateur ornithologist and in 1933 he was one of eleven people (Note: The letter was signed: Desborough; Hugh S. Gladstone; Grey of Fallodon; Julian S. Huxley (Chancellor of Oxford University); T. G Longstaff; Percy R. Lowe; P. Chalmers Mitchell; Rothschild; Scone M.P. (Chairman, British Trust for Ornithology); E. L. Turner; H. F. Witherby (President, British Ornithologists' Union)) involved in the appeal that led to the foundation of the British Trust for Ornithology (BTO), an organisation for the study of birds in the British Isles.

== Personal life ==
Longstaff was twice married. He and his first wife had seven daughters. He met Charmian, his second wife, in 1938, when one of his daughters commissioned her to paint his portrait. From the early 1940s he and Charmian lived at Achiltibuie, in the Highlands of Scotland, where he died at the age of eighty-nine on 26 June 1964.
