= Mount Magog =

Mountain in Alberta/British Columbia, Canada

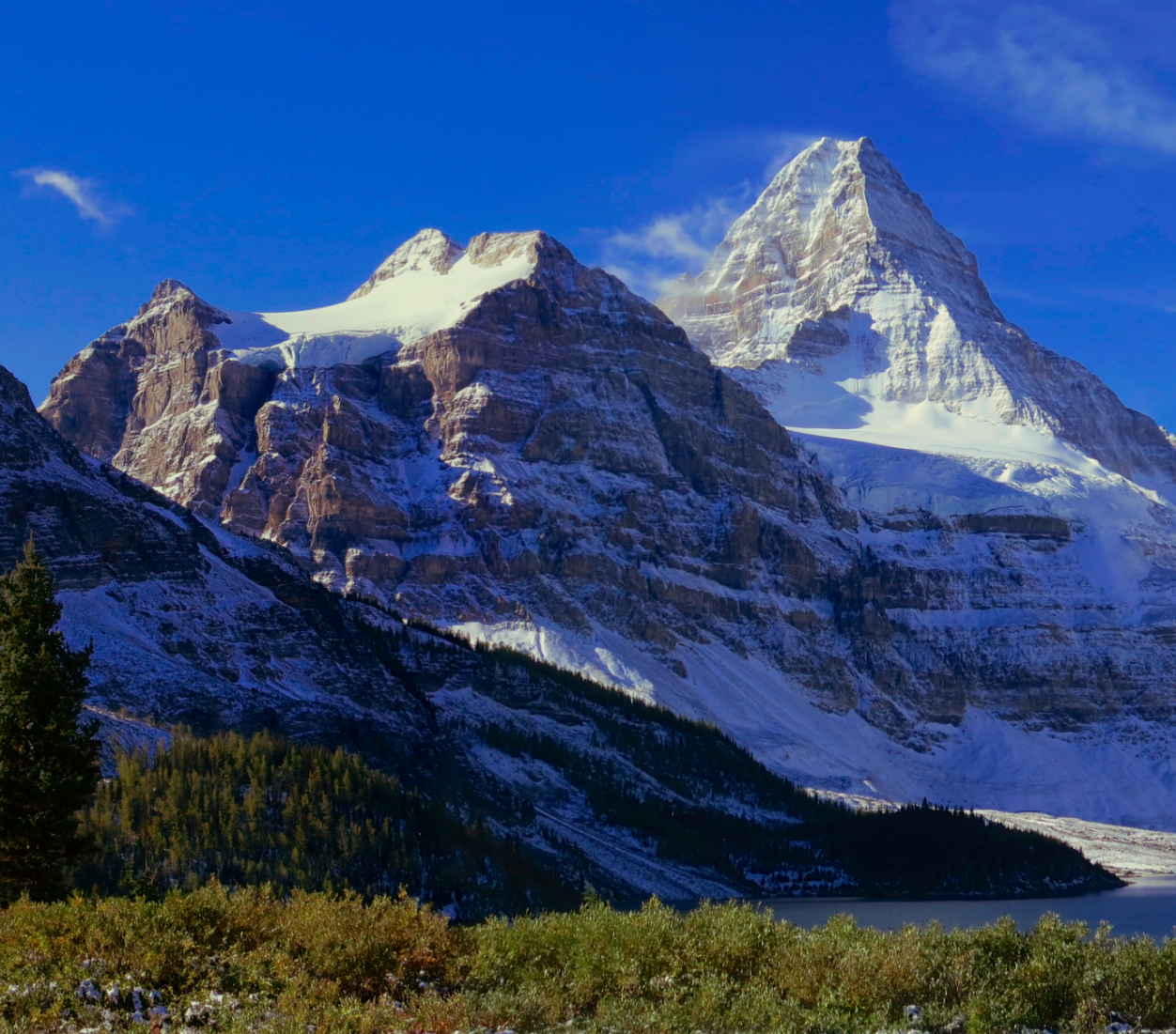
- Mt. Magog (left) and Mt. Assiniboine (right)

Highest point
- Elevation: 3,092 m (10,144 ft) (Note: Other sources state 3095 m.)
- Prominence: 188 m (617 ft)
- Parent peak: Mount Assiniboine (3616 m)
- Listing: Mountains of Alberta; Mountains of British Columbia
- Coordinates: 50°52′45″N 115°38′05″W

Geography
- Location within Alberta Location within British Columbia Location within Canada
- Country: Canada
- Provinces: Alberta and British Columbia
- Parks: Banff National Park; Mount Assiniboine Provincial Park
- Parent range: Park Ranges
- Topo map: NTS 82J13 Mount Assiniboine

Climbing
- First ascent: 1920 A.J. Gilmour, Albert H. MacCarthy, A.W. Wakefield, F.N. Waterman

Mount Magog is located on the border of Alberta and British Columbia on the Continental Divide in the Canadian Rockies. It also straddles the shared boundary of Banff National Park with Mount Assiniboine Provincial Park. It was named in 1930 after references in the Bible.

== Geology ==
Mount Magog is composed of sedimentary rock laid down from the Precambrian to Jurassic periods. Formed in shallow seas, this sedimentary rock was pushed east and over the top of younger rock during the Laramide orogeny.

== Climate ==
Based on the Köppen climate classification, Mount Magog is located in a subarctic climate with cold, snowy winters, and mild summers. Temperatures can drop below -20°C with wind chill factors below -30°C.

== Gallery ==
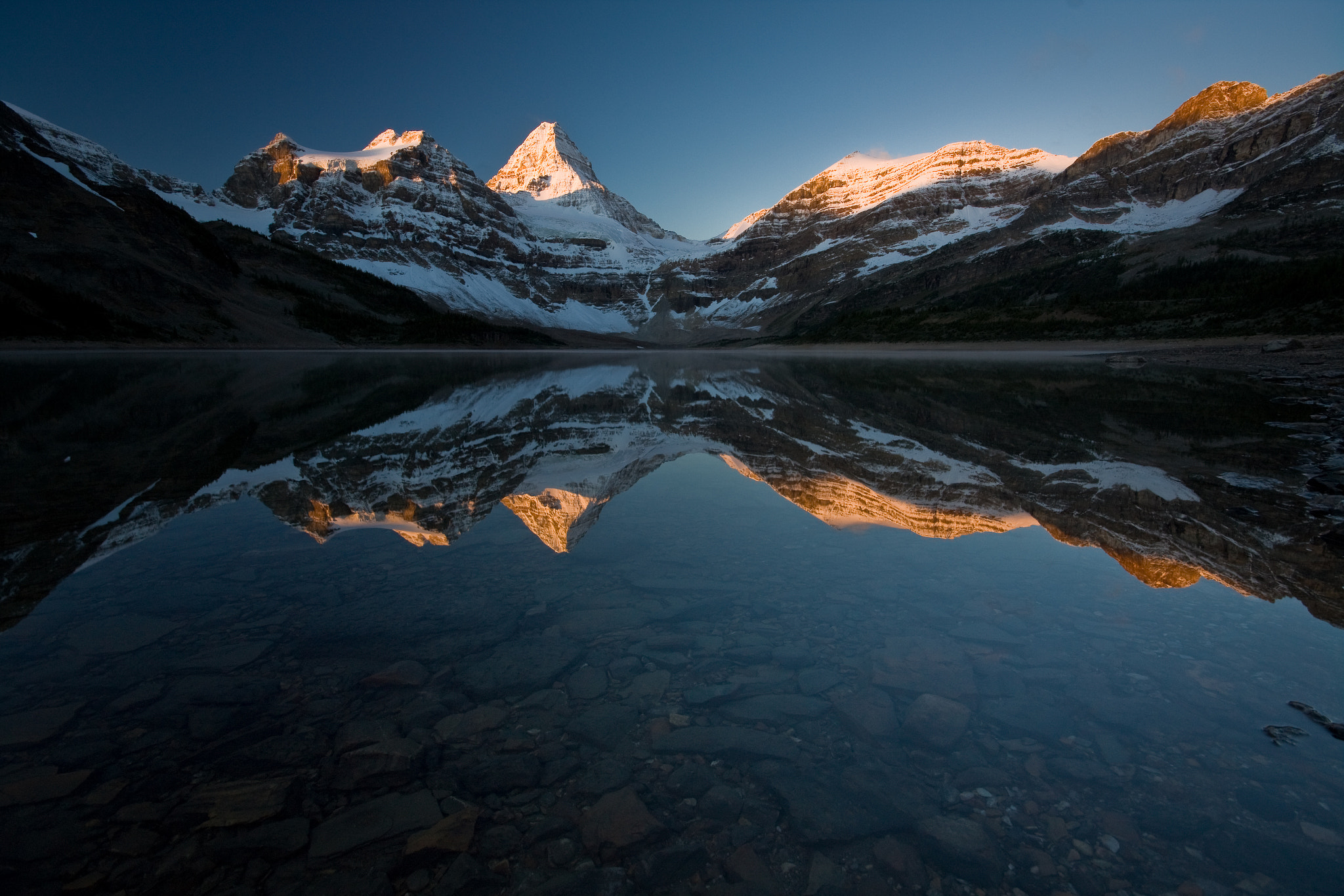
Magog Lake sunrise, Mt. Magog to left

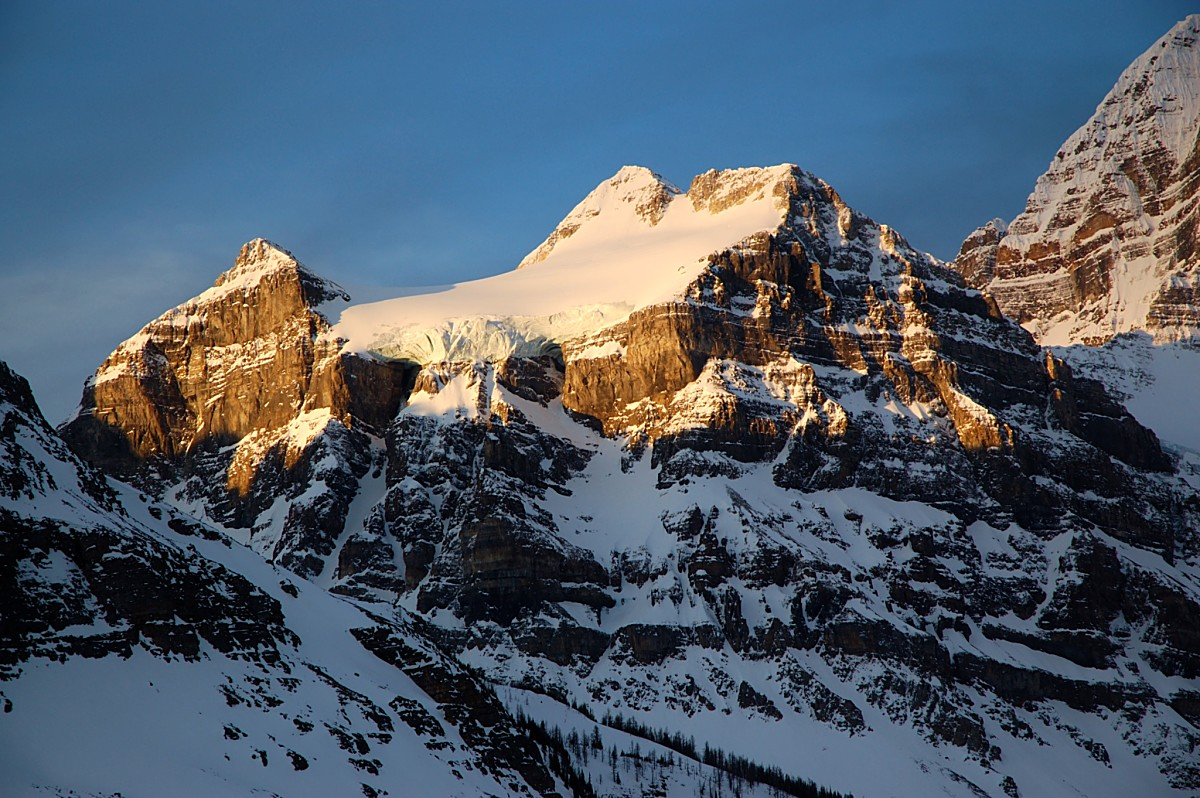
Mount Magog

== See also ==
- List of peaks on the Alberta–British Columbia border
- List of mountains in the Canadian Rockies
