= Simpson River (British Columbia) =

River in British Columbia, Canada

Coordinates: 50°58′15″N 115°56′38″W

Simpson River, in Kootenay National Park, is a tributary of Vermilion River flowing through Simpson Valley; which in turn is a tributary of the Kootenay River and eventually the Columbia River. Its named tributaries include the North Simpson River, Surprise Creek, Lachine Creek, and Verdant Creek. The river's headwaters form on the north slope of Nestor Peak.

Simpson River is named for Sir George Simpson Governor of the Hudson's Bay Company which owned Ruperts Land. He discovered it while leading an expedition, consisting of 25 men and 45 horses, through this area of the Rocky Mountains in 1841. Trail blazing faster shorter routes to the jointly occupied region which the British called the Columbia District and American's referred to as Oregon Country, was essential if the British were to hold it. A trail blaze with his initials, was found in 1904 atop Simpson Pass, near present-day Sunshine Village. It is now housed in the Banff Park Museum.

== Sources ==
- Historic Milestones of Kootenay National Park
- Trails into the Core Area of Mount Assiniboine
- BC Names/GeoBC entry "Simpson River"
