= Mount Assiniboine Provincial Park =

Provincial park in British Columbia, Canada

- IUCN category II (national park)
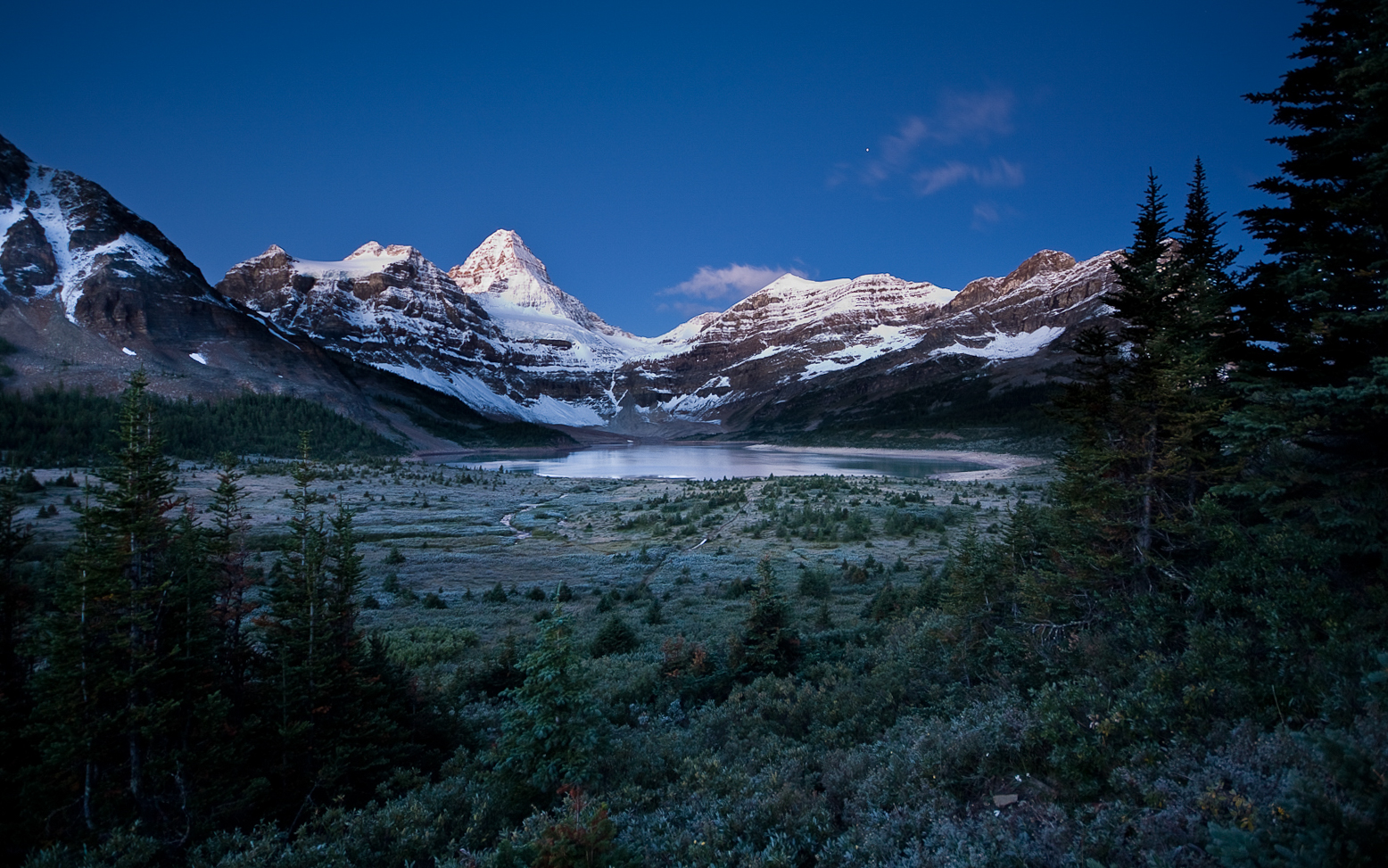
- Mount Assiniboine and Lake Magog at dawn

- Location within British Columbia
- Interactive map of Mount Assiniboine Provincial Park
- Location: East Kootenay, British Columbia, Canada
- Nearest city: Banff, Alberta
- Coordinates: 50°56′N 115°44′W
- Area: 39,050 ha (150.8 sq mi)
- Established: 1922
- Governing body: BC Parks
- Website: bcparks.ca/explore/parkpgs/mt_assiniboine/

UNESCO World Heritage Site
- Part of: Canadian Rocky Mountain Parks
- Criteria: Natural: (vii), (viii)
- Reference: 304
- Inscription: 1990 (14th Session)

Mount Assiniboine Provincial Park is a provincial park in British Columbia, Canada, located around Mount Assiniboine.

== History ==
The park was established in 1922. Some of the more recent history that is explorable within the park include Wheeler's Wonder Lodge (Naiset) (1924), Assiniboine Lodge (1928), the first ski lodge in the Canadian Rockies, and Sunburst (1928).

=== World Heritage Site ===
In 1990, this park was included within the Canadian Rocky Mountain Parks UNESCO World Heritage Site. Together with the other national and provincial parks that comprise the Canadian Rocky Mountain Parks, the park was recognized for its natural beauty and the geological and ecological significance of its mountain landscapes containing the habitats of rare and endangered species, mountain peaks, glaciers, lakes, waterfalls, canyons, limestone caves and fossils.

== Conservation ==
The park aims to protect a large variety of species. Eighty-four species of birds inhabit the park environs, based on sightings. Columbian ground squirrels are very common in the core area of the park.

Ten species of carnivore, including wolves, black bear, grizzly bear, weasel, cougar, and lynx inhabit the park. Six species of ungulates: elk, mule deer, white-tailed deer, moose, mountain goat, and Rocky Mountain bighorn sheep roam within park boundaries.

== Recreation ==
The following recreational activities are available: backcountry camping and hiking, horseback riding, cross-country skiing and ski touring, fishing, and hunting. There are also climbing opportunities.

Existing facilities include: 10 camping areas (75 campsites), including the main camp at Magog; 6 roofed accommodation sites (60 beds), including Mt. Assiniboine Lodge; day-use facilities at Rock Isle basin, including interpretive facilities and sanitation; 160 km of horse and hiking access trails: Assiniboine Pass, Wonder Pass, Mitchell River, Simpson River, Citadel Pass, Surprise Creek; and guide-outfitters cabins: Mitchell River and Police Meadows.

== Location ==
The park is 48 kilometres southwest of Banff, Alberta. No roads access the park. Other than helicopter transport, backcountry hiking trails are the only access to the park, the quickest route being via the Sunshine Village ski area in Banff National Park.

== See also ==
- List of British Columbia Provincial Parks
- List of Canadian provincial parks
