= Mount Assiniboine =

Mountain in Alberta and British Columbia, Canada

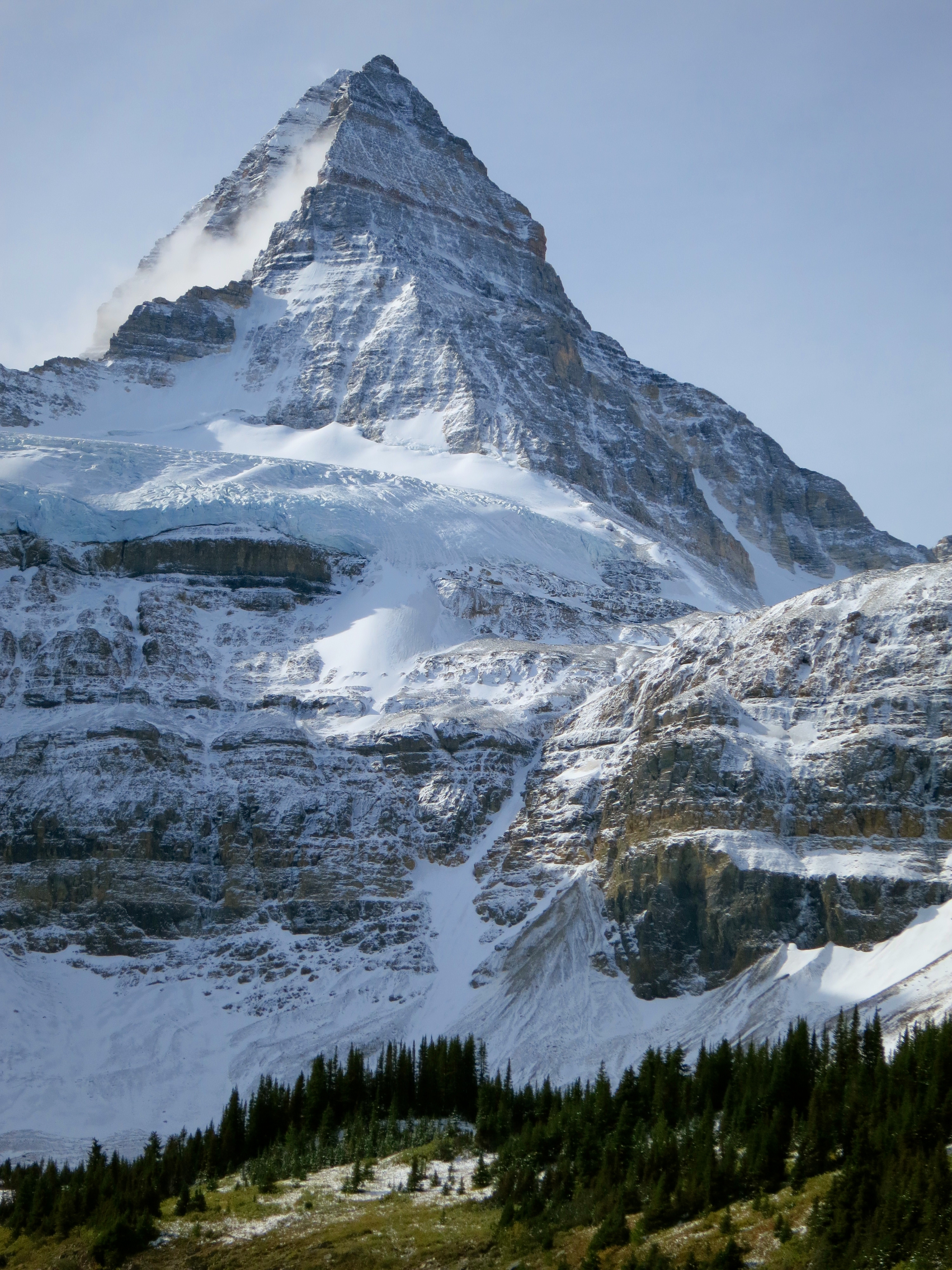
- Mount Assiniboine seen from above Lake Magog

Highest point
- Elevation: 3,618 m (11,870 ft)
- Prominence: 2,086 m (6,844 ft)
- Listing: North America prominent peaks 88th; Canada highest major peaks 34th; Canada most prominent peaks 33rd; Canada most isolated peaks 43rd
- Coordinates: 50°52′10″N 115°39′03″W

Geography
- Location within Alberta Location within British Columbia Location within Canada
- Location: Alberta–British Columbia border, Canada
- Parent range: Canadian Rockies (Assiniboine Area)
- Topo map: NTS 82J13 Mount Assiniboine

Climbing
- First ascent: 1901 by James Outram, Christian Bohren and Christian Hasler
- Easiest route: rock/snow climb (II/5.5)

Mount Assiniboine, also known as Assiniboine Mountain, is a pyramidal peak mountain on the Great Divide, on the British Columbia/Alberta border in Canada.

At 3,618 m (11,870 ft), it is the highest peak in the Southern Continental Ranges of the Canadian Rockies. Mount Assiniboine rises nearly 1,525 m (5,003 ft) above Lake Magog. Because of its resemblance to the Matterhorn in the Alps, it is nicknamed the "Matterhorn of the Rockies".

Mount Assiniboine was named by George M. Dawson in 1885. When Dawson saw Mount Assiniboine from Copper Mountain, he saw a plume of clouds trailing away from the top. This reminded him of the plumes of smoke emanating from the teepees of the Assiniboine people.

Mount Assiniboine lies on the border between Mount Assiniboine Provincial Park, in British Columbia, and Banff National Park, in Alberta. The mountain can be reached only by a six-hour hike or horse-pack 27 km (17 mi), three-hour bike ride (now disallowed to reduce human/grizzly encounters), or helicopter.

== Climbing ==
Mt. Assiniboine was first climbed in the summer of 1901 by James Outram, Christian Bohren and Christian Hasler. In 1925, Lawrence Grassi became the first person to make a solo ascent. On August 27, 2001, Bohren's granddaughter Lonnie, along with three others, made a successful ascent, celebrating the 100th anniversary of the first ascent.

There are no scrambling routes up Mt. Assiniboine. The easiest mountaineering routes are the North Ridge and North Face at YDS 5.5, which are reached from the Hind Hut.

== See also ==
- List of mountains of British Columbia
- Mountain peaks of Canada
- List of mountain peaks of North America
- List of mountain peaks of the Rocky Mountains
