= Alpinism at the Olympic Games =

Olympic Alpinism Medals – Mountaineering awards at 1924–1936 Olympics

- IOC Code: APN
- Governing body: UIAA
- Events: 1 (mixed)

Winter Olympics
- 1924

Summer Olympics
- 1896; 1900; 1904; 1908; 1912; 1920; 1924; 1928; 1932; 1936; 1948; 1952; 1956; 1960; 1964; 1968; 1972; 1976; 1980; 1984; 1988; 1992; 1996; 2000; 2004; 2008; 2012; 2016; 2020; 2024; 2028; 2032
- Medalists

Olympic gold medals for alpinism were awarded in conjunction with Olympic Games in 1924, 1932 and 1936 for the greatest mountaineering achievement within the four preceding years.

== History ==
Medals for feats of alpinism were initially floated as part of the first Olympic Congress in 1894, where it was suggested by the committee tasked with drawing up a list of sports. A prize for alpinism (as well as game hunting) was considered for the 1912 Olympic Games, but the International Olympic Committee (IOC) decided against it for several reasons, including practicability, risk to human life and the lack of an exceptional feat of alpinism between 1908 and 1911.

=== Everest medals ===
The first alpinism medals, in 1924, were given to the members of the unsuccessful 1922 British Mount Everest expedition led by Charles Granville Bruce. They were given out at the closing ceremony of the 1924 Winter Olympics in Chamonix, but bore the inscription of the 1924 Summer Olympics in Paris. 21 people: all 13 of the European members of the expedition, the seven porters who died in an avalanche during the ascent and one Nepalese soldier (Tejbir Bura) were awarded medals. There is some doubt as to whether all awardees, or the porters' families, received them.

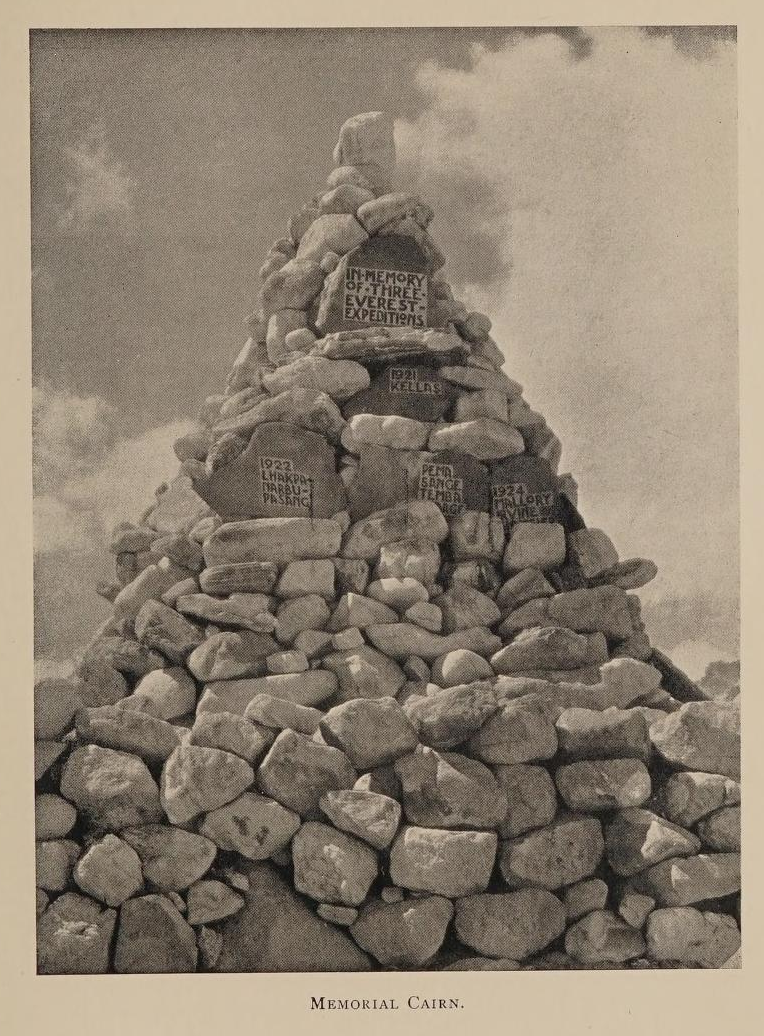
Everest Memorial Cairn erected 1924 at Everest Base Camp, Tibet

The identities of those who died in the avalanche are recorded in a brief document noting the compensation paid to their families, the names on that document are:

- Thankay Sherpa,
- Sangay Sherpa,
- Temba Sherpa,
- Lhakpa Sherpa,
- Pasang Namgya Sherpa,
- Norbu Bhotia,
- Pema Sherpa

It was recorded that six were ethnic Sherpa and one Bhotia and their dependants were said to be living in Darjeeling, Nepal and Tibet. The Mount Everest Committee asked the expedition leader, General Bruce, "to see that suitable provision is made for the families of the gallant porters who had served so nobly and fallen in the final assault."

After the deaths of George Mallory and Andrew "Sandy" Irvine in 1924 a memorial cairn was erected at the Base Camp used by the 1924 British Mount Everest expedition. In addition to the names of Mallory and Irvine the cairn bears the names of the seven porters who were posthumously awarded the Olympic medals following their deaths in the avalanche of 1922. The exact spelling on the cairn of some of the porter's names differs slightly from the spelling in the records for compensation. The memorial's construction was led by Bentley Beetham and Howard Somervell, they had no cement or proper tools for the job and screwdrivers were used as chisels to inscribe the names of the dead from both the 1921, 1922 and 1924 expeditions. (Note: The cairn no longer exists but the photograph shows part of at least one other name from the 1924 expedition, the obscured 1924 names were those of a Gurkha NCO, Lancenaik Shamsherpun, who died of a "brain haemorrhage" and a cobbler named Manbahadur who died as a result of severe frostbite. The name of Alexander Kellas, who died on the 1921 British Mount Everest reconnaissance expedition, was also recorded on the cairn.)

In 2012, mountaineer Kenton Cool took the medal which was awarded to Arthur Wakefield to the summit of Mount Everest, fulfilling a pledge originally made by Lt Col Strutt, who was the deputy leader of the 1922 expedition and the representative who received the medals at the award ceremony in 1924.

=== Alpine medals ===
After no medals were given out in 1928, the 1932 prize was awarded to German brothers Franz and Toni Schmid for being the first people to ascend the northern wall of the Matterhorn on August 1, 1931. Toni died on May 16, 1932 while attempting to climb the Wiesbachhorn, but Franz and his father accepted medals on behalf of both brothers in a ceremony on September 5, 1932.

=== Dyhrenfurth medals ===
In 1936, medals were given to Swiss-German climber Günter Dyhrenfurth and his wife Hettie for "a series of remarkable ascents and scientific expeditions in the Himalayas". According to Olympic rules, only single performances could be considered, so the award was de facto for the pair's 1934 expedition, in which Hettie broke the women's altitude record by climbing 7313 meters. Despite the 1936 Summer Olympics being held in Berlin, Hettie being Jewish, and the pair having left Germany due to Adolf Hitler's rise to power, the German members of the IOC did not file any objections. Günter, who was also one-quarter Jewish, traveled alone to Berlin to accept the award during the 1936 Summer Olympics closing ceremony. The Dyhrenfurths were nonetheless left out of the Official Report of the Games, which caused Günter to send a letter of protest to the publisher.

=== After the 1930s ===
The IOC agreed to end the prize for alpinism in 1946, following a request from the Swiss. In 1988, the Olympic Order was presented to Reinhold Messner and Jerzy Kukuczka, the first two people to climb all fourteen eight-thousanders. Messner declined the award, citing mountaineering as a creative activity and not a competition, while Kukuczka accepted it, though simultaneously distinguished it from a real Olympic medal.

== Medal table ==
The award from 1924 is awarded to a mixed team by the IOC (since the expedition was British-led, but some recipients were Indian or Nepalese). Only the medal from 1924 is assigned to the Winter Olympics by the IOC in its database, namely for the 1924 Winter Olympics in Chamonix for the Mixed team, while the medals from 1932 and 1936 are assigned to the Summer Olympics for the respective NOCs.

Rank	Nation	Gold	Silver	Bronze	Total
1	Germany	1	0	0	1
1	Mixed team	1	0	0	1
1	Switzerland	1	0	0	1
Totals (3 entries)		3	0	0	3

== Medalists ==
Games	Gold	Silver	Bronze
1924 Chamonix	Mixed team 1922 British Mount Everest expedition team Great Britain (13) Charles Granville Bruce; Edward Lisle Strutt; George Mallory; Henry Morshead; John Noel; Tom Longstaff; Geoffrey Bruce; Howard Somervell; Arthur Wakefield; Edward Norton; Colin Crawford; John Morris; George Finch (AUS) India (7) Narbu Sherpa; Lhakpa Sherpa; Pasang Sherpa; Pembra Sherpa; Antarge Sherpa; Temba Sherpa; Sange Sherpa Nepal (1) Tejbir Bura	No further medals awarded	No further medals awarded
1932 Los Angeles	Germany; Franz Schmid; Toni Schmid	No further medals awarded	No further medals awarded
1936 Berlin	Switzerland; Günter Oskar Dyhrenfurth; Hettie Dyhrenfurth	No further medals awarded	No further medals awarded
