= Tejbir Bura =

Nepalese mountaineer and soldier

Naik Tejbir Bura
- Allegiance: Nepal
- Branch: British Indian Army
- Rank: Naik
- Commands: 2nd Battalion of 6th Gurkha Rifles

Tejbir Bura was a Nepalese soldier, mountaineer and a gold medalist in alpinism, as he was recognized during the 1924 Winter Olympics for his participation in the 1922 British Mount Everest expedition. In 1922 he was a non-commissioned officer (NCO) of the 6th Gurkha Rifles, part of the British India Army, and held the rank of Naik, which in India is equivalent to the rank of corporal.

== Olympic medal ==
The father of the Modern Olympics, Pierre de Coubertin stated that an Olympic medal for alpinism should be awarded to the Mount Everest climbers who were part of the 1922 Everest expedition. The athletes who were part of that expedition received gold medals at the 1924 Winter Olympics, although they are not considered in the medal tallies of the International Olympic Committee. Tejbir Bura was the first Nepalese to win an Olympic medal, and he is still regarded as the only gold medalist for Nepal in its Olympic history, despite that his medal isn't recognised as official according to the rules of the IOC. His medal is in the collection of the Gurkha Museum in Winchester.

== Everest 1922 ==
With the exception of Tejbir Bura, the Olympic medals awarded to the non-European members of the 1922 British Mount Everest expedition were all posthumous awards made to porters who died in the avalanche on 7 June. Tejbir was not involved in the avalanche, his medal was in recognition of his achievements at an earlier stage of the expedition.

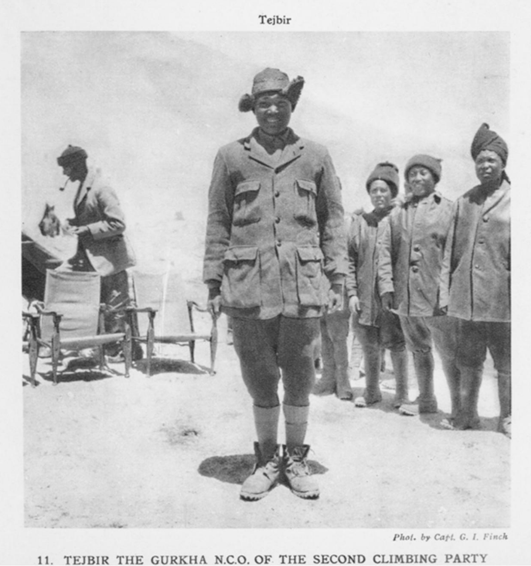
Tejbir Bura on 1922 Everest expedition

In mid-May 1922, while all of the other European expedition members were involved in the first attempt on the mountain, George Ingle Finch and Geoffrey Bruce remained at base-camp. Tejbir was also there. Bruce who was the expedition's transport officer and interpreter was also Tejbir's senior officer in the Gurkhas and neither of them had any experience of mountaineering on snow and ice. Finch was recovering from earlier efforts at altitude, he was also responsible for the rudimentary oxygen equipment that the expedition had taken and was working on repairs and modifications so that it could be trialled high on the mountain. When Finch was satisfied with his work on the oxygen equipment he was keen to head higher up the mountain and needed someone to accompany him. Despite their lack of mountaineering experience, Geoffrey Bruce and Tejbir agreed to join Finch when he left base-camp to head up the mountain on 16 May. On reaching Camp II Finch gave them both some training in using an ice-axe and other mountaineering equipment. The three climbers reached Camp III where Finch checked the oxygen cylinders which had previously been cached there, those were found to be in a good state. A few days were spent making sure that Bruce and Tejbir knew how to use the equipment and carrying out various oxygen trials. One of those trials, on 22 May, involved the three climbers using the oxygen equipment in an ascent to the North Col and then descending back to Camp III. During their ascent they met George Mallory, Howard Somervell, Teddy Norton, and Henry Morshead who were descending after an unsuccessful attempt on the summit, but one on which Mallory, Somervell and Norton had reached 8,225 m (26,985 ft) on the mountain's North Ridge, without using supplemental oxygen, at the time that was the highest point that any climber had ever reached.

On 24 May Finch, Bruce and Tejbir once again climbed to the North Col, this time accompanied by John Noel who was the expedition's cameraman and cinematographer. They spent the night there and the following day Finch, Bruce and Tejbir set off from the camp at 8 a.m. to make an attempt on the summit using bottled oxygen. In the film that Noel made, Climbing Mount Everest, the three men can be seen roped together, each wearing an oxygen set, as they are setting off. Twelve porters carried extra oxygen bottles and other equipment without the aid of supplemental oxygen and it was clear that the three mountaineers, although having heavier loads, could climb faster than the porters. As the wind strengthened they erected camp at 7,460 m (24,480 ft) and the porters descended. During the night the rising wind forced snow into the tent and they were "all thickly covered in a fine frozen spindrift". The following morning, 26 May, the wind continued although the snow had stopped, the weather forced the group to remain in tent at their camp for the whole day and at one point "a great hole was cut by a stone in one side of the tent". Because the second day at camp was unplanned they were short of food but a greater concern arose during the second night when the temperature plummeted. Finch could fell his limbs going numb and recognised that this could indicate the beginnings of frostbite, the other two men were also showing the effects. Finch then had the idea of breathing some of the oxygen from the cylinders that had been carried up, the effect was instantaneous so they rigged up a system allowing them to breathe supplemental oxygen as they slept - the first time that this had been done at high altitude. The following day the party achieved another first when the reached 8,320 m (27,300 ft) on the north-east ridge, an altitude record which bettered the one set a few days earlier by Mallory, Somervell and Norton, but Tejbir did not quite reach that point. The three had set off together at 6:30 a.m. on the morning of 27 May, Finch and Bruce were each carrying c. 40 lb (18 kg). Tejbir carried two extra cylinders of oxygen so his load was c. 50 lb (23 kg), it soon became apparent that his clothing wasn't good enough to protect him against the steadily increasing wind, he grew slower and at 7,925 m (26,000 ft) was unable to continue the ascent. After Tejbir started descending Finch and Bruce continued climbing the ridge, when they reached 8,320 m (27,300 ft) they were unable to continue any further and decided that they too must descend. They were re-united with Tejbir at their high camp, the three reached the Camp on the North Col at about 4 p.m, and continued their descent to Camp III.

Finch believed that one of the reasons he, Tejbir, and Bruce were able to survive the two nights camped in a storm at 7,460 m (24,480 ft) was that they breathed supplementary oxygen at a low rate from their oxygen sets. Nonetheless, Tejbir had "lost a good deal of skin from seven or eight fingers and a large patch off his foot, but though his frostbites were many, they were slight". After the expedition General Bruce, the expedition's leader, a cousin of Geoffrey Bruce and a senior Gurkha officer, wrote that "Tejbir Bura, very highly distinguished himself".

Two years later Tejbir was one of the Gurkha NCOs who was seconded to the 1924 British Mount Everest expedition. On that expedition he, along with Hurke Gurung, another Gurkha NCO who was also on the 1922 expedition, were entrusted with the supervision of Camps I and II.

== See also ==
- Nepal at the Olympics
