= Georges Dreyer =

Danish pathologist (1873–1934)

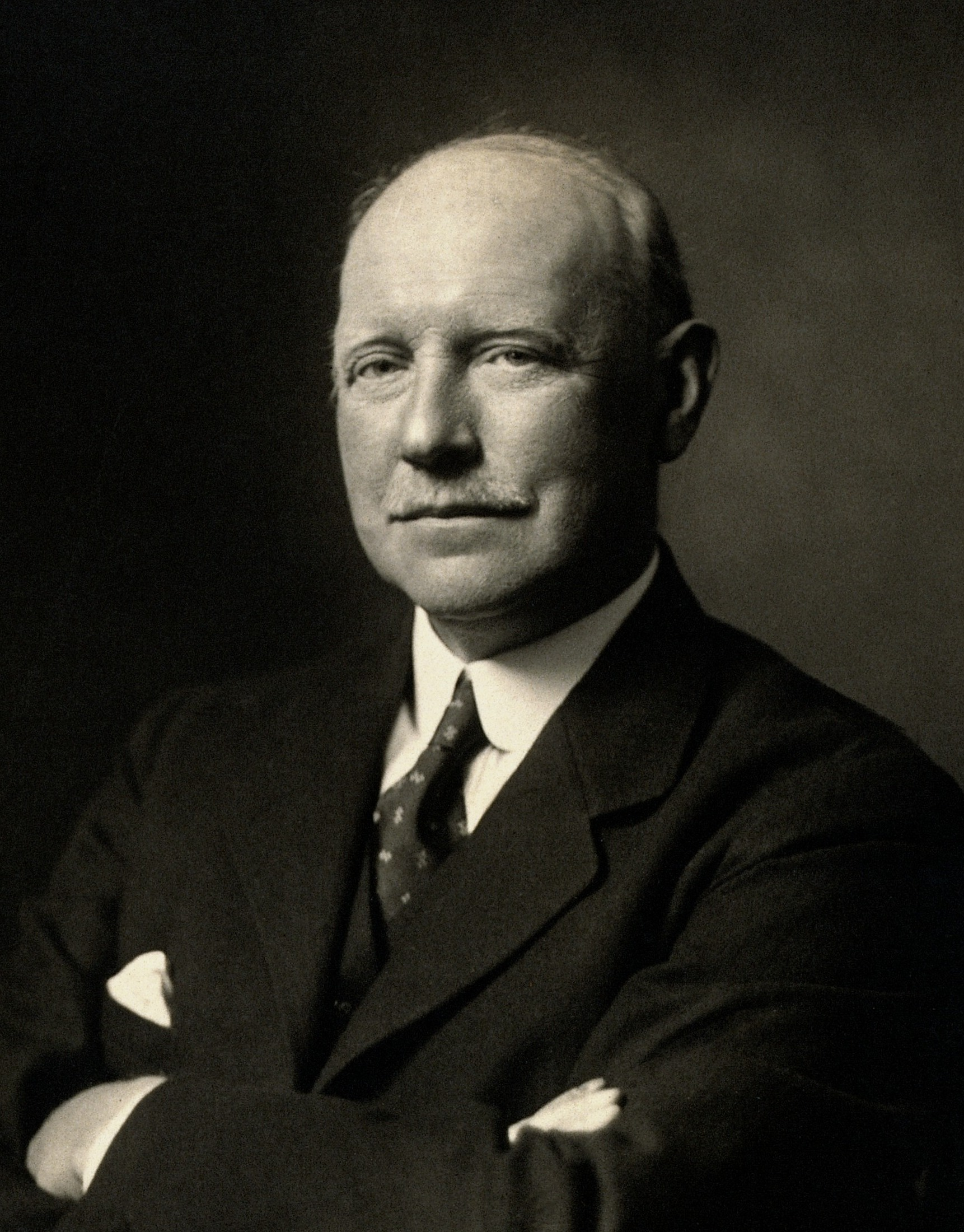
Georges Dreyer

Georges Dreyer (4 July 1873 – 17 August 1934) was a Danish pathologist.

== Biography ==
Dreyer was born in Shanghai, where his father was stationed as an officer with the Royal Danish Navy. In 1900 he earned his medical degree from the University of Copenhagen, and subsequently began work in the field of bacteriology, for which he spent a period of time at Finsen Institute in Copenhagen.

In 1907 he became the first professor of pathology at Oxford University, a position he maintained until 1934, the year he died. During World War I, Dreyer was a consultant to the British Royal Flying Corps. He was elected a fellow of the Royal Society in May 1921.

Dreyer specialized in the fields of bacteriology and virology, performing extensive studies involving vaccines and immunization. He conducted investigations on variations of blood volume among different species, and studied the relationship of blood volume to an animals' surface area and weight. Dreyer is also credited with introducing a modification of the Widal test for diagnosis of typhoid and paratyphoid.

He is remembered today for his work in respiratory physiology, including experiments with oxygen in regards to aviation. During World War I, he developed a device that was capable of administering low oxygen mixtures to test the effects of hypoxia in aviators. He also developed a successful oxygen delivery system, and was responsible for installation of the first low-pressure chamber at a British learning institution.

When George Ingle Finch was preparing for the 1922 British Mount Everest expedition he was advised by Dreyer about the likely need for additional oxygen when climbing at high altitude. Finch's performance at simulated altitudes in the low-pressure chamber was also assessed and Dreyer proposed appropriate flow rates for the oxygen at different altitudes. As a result of this meeting, bottled oxygen was taken by the party on the 1922 expedition.

== See also ==
- Pathology
- List of pathologists
