= Howard Somervell =

British surgeon, mountaineer and painter

Olympic medal record

Men's Alpinism

Representing United Kingdom

Olympic Games
Gold medal – first place	1924 Chamonix	Everest expedition

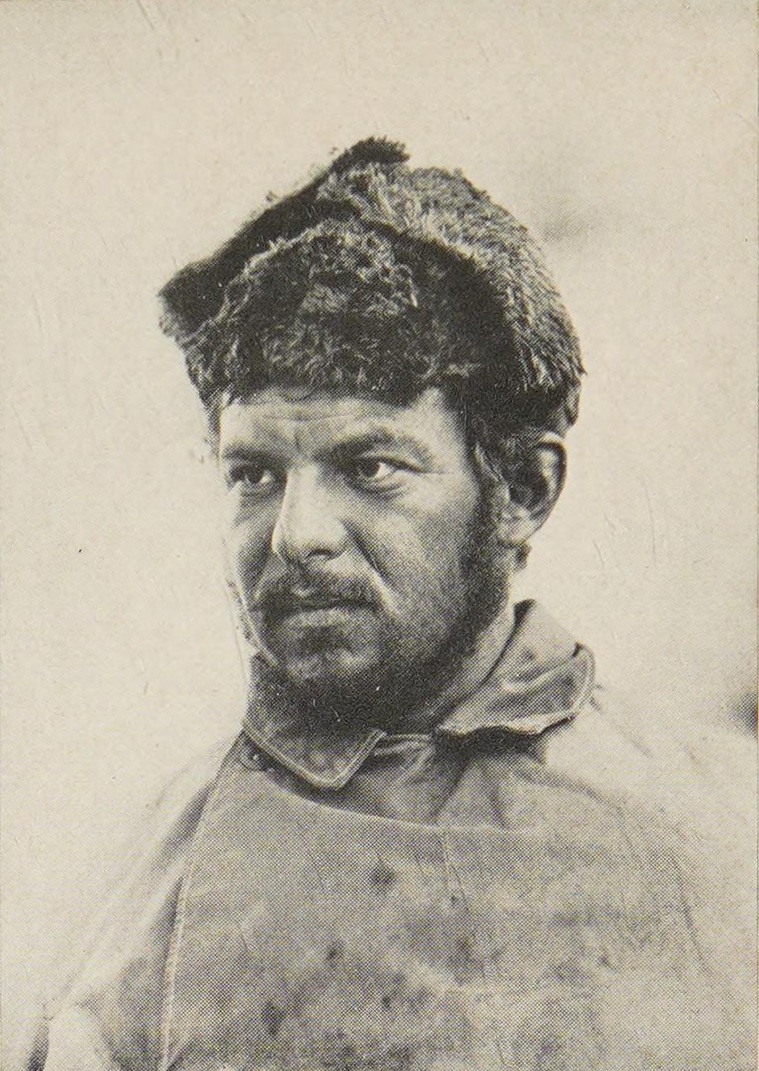
Howard Somervell shortly after the 1924 Everest expedition

Theodore Howard Somervell OBE, FRCS (16 April 1890 – 23 January 1975) was an English surgeon, mountaineer, painter and missionary who was a member of two expeditions to Mount Everest in the 1920s, and then spent nearly 40 years working as a doctor in India. In 1924 he was awarded an Olympic Gold Medal by Pierre de Coubertin for his achievements in mountaineering (Alpinism).

== Early life ==
Somervell was born in Kendal, Westmorland, England, to a well-off family which owned the shoe-manufacturing business founded by two Somervell brothers in Kendal in 1845, that became K Shoes. His father William Somervell (1860 – 1934) was a businessman, philanthropist and Liberal politician. He attended Rugby School, and at the age of eighteen joined the Fell and Rock Climbing Club, beginning an interest in climbing, art and mountaineering which would last a lifetime. He studied at Gonville and Caius College, Cambridge where he developed his strong Christian faith and gained First Class Honours in the Natural Sciences Tripos. He then began training as a surgeon at University College Hospital; eventually graduating in 1921 after his training had been interrupted by the First World War.

He married Margaret Hope Simpson (1899–1993), daughter of Sir James Hope Simpson, the general manager of the Bank of Liverpool. With Margaret he had three sons: James, David, and Hugh.

== First World War ==
Between 1915 and 1918 Somervell served in France with the Royal Army Medical Corps. He was commissioned as a lieutenant with the West Lancashire Casualty Clearing Station on 17 May 1915, having previously been a member of the University of London Officer Training Corps. He was Mentioned in Despatches, but the horrors of the war had a profound effect on him. During the Battle of the Somme in 1916 he was one of four surgeons working in a tent, while hundreds of wounded men lay dying on stretchers outside. On short breaks from surgery, he spoke with some of the dying men, and noted that not one asked to be treated ahead of the others. The experience turned Somervell into a pacifist, a belief he held for the rest of his life. He relinquished his commission in 1921, by which time he held the rank of captain.

== First Everest expedition ==
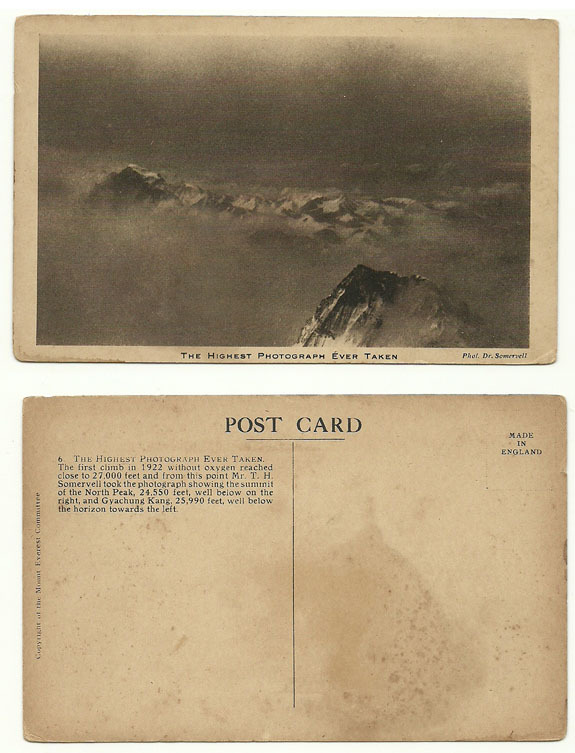
A postcard of "The Highest Photograph Ever Taken" (the summit of the North Peak and Gyachung Kang of Everest, photographed by T. H. Somervell in 1922)

By 1922, Somervell had shown himself a capable climber in the Lake District and the Alps, where he climbed in particular with Bentley Beetham, a climber, photographer and ornithologist from Darlington. Somervell was invited to join the 1922 British Everest expedition. During the expedition, he formed a close friendship with George Mallory, and the two famously read Shakespeare to one another in their tent at night. By 18 May, Somervell, Mallory and two other climbers and several Sherpa porters had established camp on the North Col, at 7020 metres the highest man had ever camped, and prepared to make the first ever attempt on the summit of Everest along the North Ridge and then the Northeast Ridge. Their plan had been to establish a further camp at around 8000 m, but in the thin air it proved impossible to climb as quickly as they hoped, and they were forced to send the Sherpas down and make camp on a cramped ledge at around 7600 m. The following day, exhausted and suffering from frostbite, they reached a height of 8170 m before turning round, realising that they had no hope of reaching the summit before dark. They had set a world altitude record, but such is the scale of Everest that they had not even reached the junction with the Northeast Ridge.

Over the next few days a second group of climbers, Geoffrey Bruce and George Finch, using oxygen, made a second unsuccessful attempt on the summit. With the weakened climbers back at Base Camp (only Somervell was considered fit to continue by the expedition doctor), and the weather becoming worse with the imminent arrival of the monsoon, Somervell and Mallory argued that the team should make a third attempt, against the advice of Charles Bruce, the expedition leader. On 7 June, Somervell was part of a party of three British climbers leading fourteen Sherpas through waist-deep fresh snow on the slopes below the North Col. An avalanche occurred, killing seven Sherpas. Somervell was shocked, and felt great guilt that it was the Sherpas who had paid the price for the poor judgement of the British climbers, writing

"I would gladly at that moment have been lying there dead in the snow, if only to give those fine chaps who had survived the feeling that we shared their loss, as we had shared their risk."

== Travels in India ==
With the expedition over, Somervell set out to see India, travelling from the far north to Cape Comorin, its southernmost point. He was shocked by the poverty he saw, and in particular the poor medical facilities. At the main hospital of the south Travancore medical mission in Neyyoor he found a single surgeon struggling to cope with a long queue of waiting patients, and immediately offered to assist. On his return to Britain, he abandoned his promising medical career, and announced his intention to work in India permanently after his next attempt on Everest. Most of his paintings sold today are from his travels in various parts of India. Even though most of his time was in Kerala where many landmarks to his name still remain.

== Second Everest expedition ==
Somervell returned to Everest with the 1924 expedition. Throughout the expedition he was dogged by a sore throat, hacking cough and occasional difficulty breathing, but remained one of the strongest members of the team. The team's first summit attempt was aborted due to bad weather, and during the retreat four porters who had refused to descend the avalanche prone slopes below the North Col were left sitting on a ledge overnight. Somervell led the rescue operation the next morning, undertaking a delicate traverse of the avalanche slope to reach the four men.

Once the team had regrouped and high camps re-established, Somervell made the next summit attempt with Edward Norton. Setting out from Camp VI at 6:40 a.m. on 4 June, they made a traverse of the North Face below the Northeast Ridge, thereby by-passing the now notorious Second Step. Somervell, racked by coughing fits, decided at noon that he could go no further. Norton continued alone for a short distance before judging that snow conditions were too dangerous for a lone, unroped climber. They had reached an altitude of 8570 m; a record which would not be broken, with certainty, until 1952.

On the descent, the throat problems which had plagued Somervell reached a climax, and he found himself fighting for his life as some flesh came loose and caused him to choke. Unable to speak or attract Norton's attention he sat down in the snow to die. He later wrote of what happened next;

"Finally, I pressed my chest with both hands, gave one last almighty push – and the obstruction came up. What a relief! Coughing up a little blood, I once more breathed really freely – more freely than I had done for some days. Though the pain was intense, I was a new man."

The obstruction was the entire mucous membrane lining Somervell's throat, which had become badly frostbitten in the cold air.

== Medical career ==
Somervell worked as a surgeon with the London Missionary Society Boys' Brigade Hospital at Kundara during 1923–1949. There was a separate operation theatre for him in that hospital. He had donated £1,000 to the hospital. In 1940 he published a book of his experiences entitled Knife and Life in India.

Somervell became an associate professor of surgery at Vellore Christian Medical College in 1949, a post he held until his retirement in 1961. He was appointed an Officer of the Order of the British Empire (OBE) in the 1953 New Year Honours. He returned to England in 1961 and was president of the Alpine Club, 1962–1964.

== Artist ==
Somervell painted many hundreds if not thousands of paintings and has been described as a compulsive sketcher and painter. The Himalayan Club identified some 600 titles, with at least 200 of them being representations of the Himalayas or Tibet. 126 of these relate to the 1922 and 1924 expeditions, many of which were exhibited at the Royal Geographical Society in April 1925 and at the Redfern Gallery, London, in 1926. He exhibited almost annually at the Lake Artists Society exhibitions in the Lake District after his return to England.

Many of his watercolours are painted on what has been described as no more than 'cheap' brown or off-white wrapping paper. However, given that Somervell was a sometime commercial artist, this oft-repeated tale is largely apocryphal. He used this style of paper as early as 1913 and was still using it in the 1970s. It particularly lends itself to the dun colours of the Tibetan landscape. Other artists such as John Sell Cotman and Edith Collingwood used similar paper. He often used watercolour and body colour in preference to watercolour alone. He also used pastel, either alone or with watercolour. Watercolour seems to have been his favoured medium in Tibet, Himalaya and India.

The Alpine Club in London possesses thirty paintings by Somervell. The Abbot Hall Art Gallery in Kendal has thirteen Somervell watercolours and one oil painting while the Royal Geographical Society holds a large watercolour, Gaurisankar from the North West, dated 1924, although this may in fact be a painting of Menlungtse. Somervell's paintings of the Himalayas and of Westmorland were exhibited at the Abbot Hall Art Gallery in April 1979.

== Death and commemoration ==
Somervell died in Ambleside in 1975. The Dr. Somervell Memorial Mission Hospital, established in 1975 at Karakonam, south of Trivandrum and the Dr. Somervell Memorial CSI Medical College, established in 2002, are named in his honour.

A collection of his mountaineering equipment and other effects, including his 1924 Winter Olympics gold medal, and his sketchbooks and paintings, now in the possession of his grandson, was shown on an episode of the BBC Television programme Antiques Roadshow in April 2022.

== Awards and honours ==
In 1924 he was one of twenty-one recipients of a gold medal awarded at the Winter VIII Olympiade in Chamonix for achievements in Alpinism. Pierre de Coubertin, founder of the modern Olympics admired the ethos behind mountaineering and wanted to recognise exceptional achievements with an Olympic medal.

Somervell's work as a doctor in India was recognised in the 1939 New Year Honours, when he was awarded a Kaisar-I-Hind Medal, first class. He was appointed an Officer of the Order of the British Empire (OBE) in the 1953 New Year Honours.
