= John Morris (anthropologist) =

British mountaineer, anthropologist and journalist

Major Charles John Morris CBE (1895 – 13 December 1980) was a British mountaineer, anthropologist and journalist, and controller of BBC Radio's Third Programme.

== Life ==
Morris served in the army from 1915 to 1934. After serving in the trenches during the First World War, he transferred to the Indian Army's 3rd Gurkha Rifles. He took part in two attempts to climb Mount Everest; the first under General Charles Granville Bruce and climbing leader Lt-Col Edward Lisle Strutt in 1922, and the second in 1936 under Hugh Ruttledge. On the latter, his personal servant was Tenzing Norgay, who made the first ascent of Mount Everest with Edmund Hillary in 1953.

Morris was a skilled photographer, his photographs of the indigenous people encountered on the expedition demonstrate a deep sympathy and connection with his subjects. His photographs are part of the 2024 National Trust exhibition 'Other Everests: One Mountain, Many Worlds'. Morris's language skills as a Gurkha officer enabled him to communicate with the people he was photographing. As time went on, Morris was increasingly critical of colonial attitudes towards race and the subject peoples of empire, informed by his experience as a gay man who had several long-term relationships with indigenous partners.

He received an award from the Royal Geographical Society for his exploration of Chinese Turkistan, while still in the army. He retired from military service in the mid-1930s and taught English in Japan. He was Professor of English Literature, Keio University and lecturer at Imperial and Bunrika Universities, Tokyo from 1938 and also adviser on the English language to Japan's Dept. of Foreign affairs. He was repatriated by the Diplomatic corps after Japan's entry into the Second World War and joined the BBC, running their Far East service.

Morris was head of the BBC Far Eastern Service 1943–1952, and controller for the BBC Third Programme 1952–1958. From February 1943 to October 1943 he worked in the same department as George Orwell, at 200 Oxford Street. He wrote an article about Orwell, "Some are more equal than others", for Penguin New Writing Number 40, September 1950 which was reprinted in Orwell Remembered with the title "That Curiously Crucified Expression":

George Orwell always reminded me of one of those figures on the front of Chartres Cathedral [-] my inability to enjoy his filthy cigarettes was symbolic; it represented other things which made any sort of intimacy between us quite impossible.

Stephen Spender described Morris in his Journals as:

A not very daring promoter of the cause of culture, cruelly teased by his friend E. M. Forster, who referred to him as 'the pudding'.

He was made a Commander of the Order of the British Empire in the 1957 New Year Honours, and appeared as a castaway on the BBC Radio programme Desert Island Discs on 16 February 1959.

== Bibliography ==
- ——; Brook Northey, W (1928). The Gurkhas : their manners, customs, and country. John Lane The Bodley Head.
- —— (1938). Living with Lepchas.
- —— (1943). Traveller from Tokyo. The Cresset Press.
- —— (1947). The Phoenix Cup. The Cresset Press.
- —— (1963). "A Winter in Nepal". The Geographical Journal. 129 (4): 523. Bibcode:1963GeogJ.129..523G. doi:10.2307/1794694. JSTOR 1794694.
- —— (1985). The Gurkhas, an ethnology.
