= Franz Schmid =

German mountaineer

- Born: 17 January 1905
- Died: 18 September 1992 (aged 87)
- Occupations: Police inspector, mountaineer
- Known for: First to climb Matterhorn northern wall

Franz Schmid (17 January 1905 – 18 September 1992) was a German mountaineer.

== Career ==
In 1932, he won a gold medal for alpinism at the Olympic Games, along with his brother Toni (posthumously), for being the first people to climb the northern wall of the Matterhorn on 1 August 1931. The same year, Schmid also climbed the north face of the Ortler with Hans Ertl.

In his life, Schmid conquered around 2,000 summits. He worked as a police inspector.

The "Schmid route" of the Matterhorn is named after the brothers today.
