= Toni Schmid =

German mountaineer

- Born: 22 August 1909
- Died: 16 May 1932 (aged 22)
- Occupations: Construction engineer, mountaineer
- Known for: First to climb Matterhorn northern wall

Toni Schmid (22 August 1909 – 16 May 1932) was a German mountaineer.

== Career ==
In 1932, he posthumously won a gold medal for alpinism at the Olympic Games, along with his brother Franz, for being the first people to climb the northern wall of the Matterhorn on 1 August 1931. Schmid died on 16 May 1932 while attempting to climb the northwest face of the Wiesbachhorn. His friend, future Olympic canoeist Ernst Krebs, survived the accident.

Toni worked as a construction engineer. His nickname was "Toni Tollkühn" ("Temerity Tony").

The "Schmid route" of the Matterhorn is named after the brothers today.
