= High-altitude breathing apparatus =

Equipment which allows the user to breathe at hypoxic altitudes

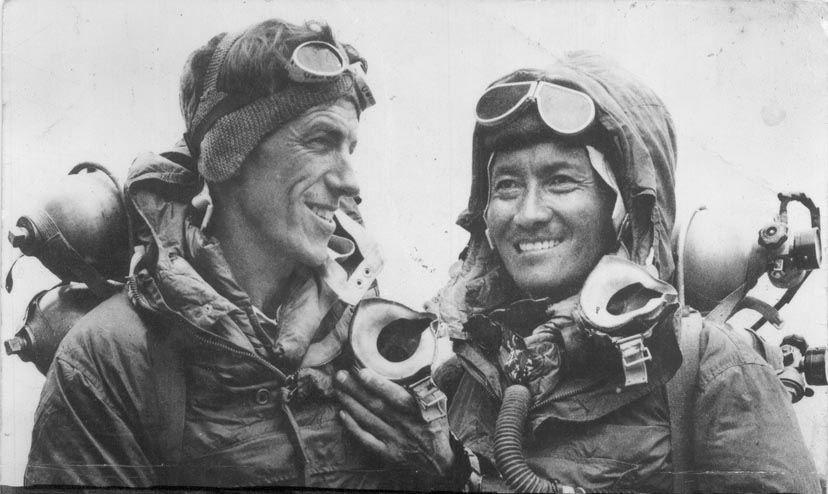
Edmund Hillary and Tenzing Norgay, 29 May 1953 after successfully completing the first ascent of Mount Everest using open-circuit supplemental oxygen

High-altitude breathing apparatus is a breathing apparatus which allows a person to breathe more effectively at an altitude where the partial pressure of oxygen in the ambient atmospheric air is insufficient for the task or to sustain consciousness or human life over the long or short term.

High-altitude breathing sets may be classified by type in several ways:

- by application: aviation breathing apparatus and mountaineering breathing apparatus,
- by breathing gas source: self-contained gas supply, or remotely supplied gas,
- by breathing circuit type: open, semi-closed, or closed circuit,
- by gas supply type: constant flow, supply on demand, or supplemental,
- by ventilatory driving force: the breathing effort of the user, or mechanical work from an external source,
- by gas mixture: air, oxygen-enriched, or pure oxygen.

The user respiratory interface is the delivery system by which the breathing apparatus guides the breathing gas flow to and from the user. Some form of facepiece, hood or helmet is usual.

Any given unit is a member of several types.

== Breathing at high altitude ==
High-altitude breathing apparatus is used for unpressurised (ambient pressure) aeronautical and mountaineering activities where the oxygen content of the natural atmosphere is insufficient for maintaining physical activity, consciousness, or life, but the atmospheric pressure is sufficient that a pressure suit is not needed.

Both rebreather and open-circuit equipment have been used in this application, where either pure oxygen or supplemental oxygen is provided by the equipment. Minor leakage in either direction usually only affects efficiency and gas endurance, as the ambient air is usually only hypobaric due to low ambient pressure.

=== Altitude zones ===
At high altitude, from 1,500 to 3,500 metres (4,900 to 11,500 ft) there are physiological effects of the reduced oxygen partial pressure, which include reduced exercise performance and increased respiratory rate. Arterial oxygen saturation is generally still over 90% in healthy people, but arterial P_{O_{2}} is reduced.

At very high altitude, from 3,500 to 5,500 metres (11,500 to 18,000 ft) arterial oxygen saturation falls below 90%, and arterial P_{O_{2}} is reduced to the extent that extreme hypoxemia may occur during exercise and sleep, and if high-altitude pulmonary edema occurs. In this range severe altitude illness is common.

At extreme altitude, above 5,500 metres (18,000 ft), one can expect significant hypoxemia, hypocapnia and alkalosis, with progressive deterioration of physiological function, which exceeds acclimatisation. Consequently, there is no human habitation in this altitude range.

Above this is the zone where 100% oxygen at ambient pressure is insufficient, and some form of pressurisation is required to provide a viable inhalation oxygen pressure. The options are partial pressurisation using pressure suits and full pressurisation in space suits.

=== Physiological effects ===
In the region from sea level to around 3,000 m (10,000 ft), known as the physiological-efficient zone, oxygen levels are usually high enough for humans to function without supplemental oxygen, and altitude decompression sickness is rare.

The physiological-deficient zone extends from 3,600 m (12,000 ft) to about 15,000 m (50,000 ft). In this zone there is an increased risk of hypoxia, trapped-gas dysbarism (where gas trapped in the body expands), and evolved-gas dysbarism (where dissolved gases such as nitrogen may form in the tissues, i.e. decompression sickness). Above approximately 4,300 m (14,000 ft), oxygen-rich breathing mixture is required to approximate the oxygen available in the lower atmosphere, while above 12,000 m (40,000 ft), oxygen must be provided under positive pressure. Above 15,000 m (49,000 ft), respiration is not possible because the pressure at which the lungs excrete carbon dioxide (approximately 87 mmHg, 11.6 kPa) exceeds outside air pressure. Above 19,000 m (62,000 ft), known as the Armstrong limit, exposed fluids in the throat and lungs start boiling away at normal body temperature, and pressure suits are needed. Generally, 100% oxygen is used to maintain an equivalent altitude of 3,000 m (10,000 ft).

The death zone altitude is 8,000 metres (26,000 ft) or above.

=== Physiogical acclimatisation ===
People can become acclimatised to an altitude of 5,200 to 5,500 metres (17,000 to 18,000 ft) if they remain at high altitude for long enough, but for high-altitude rescue work, rescue teams must be rapidly deployed, and the time necessary to acclimatise is not available, making oxygen breathing equipment necessary above approximately 3,700 metres (12,000 ft).

In aviation, there is generally no opportunity to acclimatise, and the necessity for breathing apparatus generally assumes that the user starts the flight at or near sea level.

== Equipment use ==
An oxygen partial pressure equivalent to sea level can be maintained at an altitude of 10,000 metres (34,000 ft) with 100% oxygen. Above 12,000 metres (40,000 ft), positive pressure breathing with 100% oxygen is essential, as without positive pressure even very short exposures to altitudes above 13,000 metres (43,000 ft) lead to loss of consciousness. Oxygen conservation devices may be used with open circuit breathing apparatus to improve efficiency of gas use at lower altitudes where ambient pressure breathing with less than 100% oxygen is viable.

=== Management ===
At high enough altitudes the partial pressure of oxygen in the air is insufficient to support useful work and consciousness, even after acclimatisation, and at even higher altitudes it cannot support human life. At altitudes where the problem is hypoxia, breathing gas with a higher oxygen content at ambient pressure is a viable solution. Supplemental oxygen sufficient to provide an equivalent altitude of a pressurised aircraft cabin (about 8000 ft) is sufficient for many purposes, but higher concentrations, such as sea level equivalent (P_{O_{2}} of about 0.21 bar), can allow a greater capacity for aerobic work. Balanced against this is the need to conserve oxygen and to minimise the weight carried by the user of breathing apparatus.

=== Practical aspects ===
Where the user must carry the supplementary oxygen supply, and also perform significant work over a fairly long period, as in mountaineering and rescue work, the efficiency of oxygen use and the reliability of the breathing apparatus are more important, and there is a trade-off of these characteristics with the weight that must be carried.

The amount of supplementary oxygen needed to bring the inhaled partial pressure to sea level equivalent, or any other fixed value greater than that of the ambient atmosphere is a function of the altitude, and increases with an increase in altitude in direct proportion to pressure drop. The amount of supplementary oxygen actually used is also proportional to respiratory minute volume, which depends on the level of exertion.

=== Drop tanks ===
To avoid carrying the weight of all the cylinders all the way up and down a peak, one or more cylinders can be cached along the route for retrieval on the return. This implies the use of two or more cylinders to carry the oxygen supply for the summit day, which may last up to 18 hours, making an endurance of about 6 hours for a full cylinder a practical choice. This strategy is not possible if a single cylinder is used.

== Types of apparatus ==
=== High-altitude supplemental oxygen ===
Mountaineering breathing apparatus provides oxygen at a higher concentration than available from atmospheric air in a naturally hypoxic environment. It needs to be lightweight and to be reliable in severe cold, including not getting choked with deposited frost from the exhaled gas, which is saturated with water vapour at body temperature.

Both chemically generated and compressed gas oxygen have been used in experimental closed-circuit oxygen mountaineering systems, but open circuit has mostly been used, although relatively wasteful, as the equipment is more reliable. For mountaineering at high altitudes where the user has to carry the stored oxygen, open-circuit demand or closed circuit may be used to maximise endurance of the set.

Breathing pure oxygen results in an elevated partial pressure of oxygen in the blood: a climber breathing pure oxygen at the summit of Mt. Everest has a greater arterial oxygen partial pressure than breathing air at sea level. This results in being able to exert greater physical effort at altitude. The exothermic carbon dioxide absorption reaction of a rebreather helps keep the scrubber contents from freezing while it is in use, and helps reduce heat loss from the user, but is vulnerable to freezing during periods when it is not in active use.

Unpressurised aircraft and high-altitude parachuting have similar requirements and working environment to mountaineering, but weight is less of a problem.

=== Closed-circuit oxygen rebreather ===
In a closed-circuit system, any unused oxygen is retained and rebreathed, so the utilisation is close to 100%, with some losses possible due to expansion on increased altitude and incidental leakage from the breathing loop.

There is a risk of pulmonary oxygen toxicity if the pressure of the oxygen exceeds about 0.5 bar for extended periods, which could happen at altitudes below 5500 m, where atmospheric pressure is about half of the value at sea level.

A closed-circuit oxygen rebreather is the most efficient in terms of oxygen use, but is relatively bulky and requires the use of a carbon dioxide absorbent, which must either be sufficient for the oxygen supply or must be periodically replaced. If the oxygen supply fails, the loop gas can become more hypoxic than ambient atmosphere if the loop was not adequately purged or if it gets contaminated by ambient air. In the absence of oxygen monitoring the user may not notice the reduction in oxygen concentration.

An additional potential advantage of a rebreather is that the carbon dioxide scrubbing reaction is exothermic and keeps the gas in the breathing circuit warm if sufficiently insulated. It also conserves humidity, reducing dehydration. The disadvantages include the weight of the scrubber and the problems of the humidity condensing in the circuit and freezing, which can block the gas passages and choke the scrubber. If the scrubber freezes, it must be defrosted before the reaction can resume, taking some time to warm up to a temperature at which the reaction is sufficient.

=== Open-circuit dilutor demand regulator ===
The dilutor demand regulator was developed for high-altitude flying during the Second World War. A dilutor demand regulator draws ambient air into the mask through an orifice in the regulator, while concurrently being fed with pure oxygen through a demand valve in the regulator. For aeronautical use the size of the ambient air orifice is controlled by an aneroid valve operator and is directly proportional to atmospheric pressure. As the altitude increases, the pressure decreases, and the orifice gets smaller, so the user is provided with a higher proportion of oxygen. When correctly calibrated, the partial pressure of oxygen in the mixture remains fairly consistent at a value similar to the 0.21 bar at sea level. This system makes efficient use of a combination of ambient and stored oxygen. The function of the aneroid valve operator can be substituted for terrestrial use by a simpler, lighter, and more rugged manually operated orifice selector knob, giving a stepwise range of concentrations which is lighter, more reliable, a bit less efficient, and requires appropriate selection by the user. It also allows the user to manually adjust the mixture to match personal needs. As it is manually selected, it is less suitable for flying and more suitable for pedestrians, who do not change altitude rapidly. The flow rates through the orifice and regulator are sensitive to flow rate of inhalation and can be designed to provide a somewhat higher oxygen partial pressure at higher inhalation flow rates, which helps compensate for higher exertion.

== Oxygen sources ==
=== Bottled oxygen ===
Bottled oxygen, more broadly known as high pressure compressed oxygen, medical oxygen, and aviator's oxygen, is oxygen in small, portable, high-pressure storage cylinders. For aviation, the weight of the cylinder is usually not critical, and the choice of material may be affected by economic considerations such as purchase price and useful service life. For mountaineering many users are prepared to pay a premium for the lowest weight that will contain enough gas for the climb, which tends to favour high pressure filament wound cylinders.

=== Oxygen concentrators ===
When there is no limitation on power use and the work is to be done at a fixed location, oxygen concentrators may be an effective solution. An oxygen concentrator is a device that concentrates the oxygen from a gas supply (typically ambient air) by selectively removing nitrogen to supply an oxygen-enriched product gas stream. They are also used industrially and as medical devices for oxygen therapy. Two methods in common use are pressure swing adsorption and membrane gas separation. They are most efficient when the supplemental oxygen does not need to be at a high percentage.

Pressure swing adsorption oxygen concentrators use a molecular sieve to adsorb gases and operate on the principle of rapid pressure swing adsorption of atmospheric nitrogen onto zeolite minerals at high pressure. This type of adsorption system is therefore functionally a nitrogen scrubber, leaving the other atmospheric gases to pass through, with oxygen as the primary gas remaining. Gas separation across a membrane is also a pressure-driven process, where the driving force is the difference in pressure between inlet of raw material and outlet of product. The membrane used in the process is a generally non-porous layer, so there will not be a severe leakage of gas through the membrane. The performance of the membrane depends on permeability and selectivity. Permeability is affected by the penetrant size. Larger gas molecules have a lower diffusion coefficient. The membrane gas separation equipment typically pumps gas into the membrane module and the targeted gases are separated based on difference in diffusivity and solubility. Product gas can be delivered directly to the user through a suitable breathing apparatus.

Pulse dose (also called intermittent-flow or on-demand) portable oxygen concentrators are the smallest units, which may weigh as little as 2.3 kilograms (5 lb) Their small size enables the user to waste less of the energy gained from the treatment on carrying them. The unit administers a set volume (bolus) of oxygen enriched air at the start of each breath, which is the part of the breath most likely to reach the gas exchange regions of the lung beyond the physiological dead space. Their ability to make efficient use of oxygen is key to keeping the units compact.

=== Liquid oxygen ===
Liquid oxygen is the liquid form of molecular oxygen. It has a density of 1.141 kilograms per litre (71.2 lb/cu ft), slightly denser than liquid water, and is cryogenic with a freezing point of 54.36 K (−218.79 °C; −361.82 °F) and a boiling point of 90.19 K (−182.96 °C; −297.33 °F) at 1 bar (15 psi). Liquid oxygen has an expansion ratio of 1:861 and because of this, it is used in some commercial and military aircraft as a transportable source of breathing oxygen.

=== Chemical oxygen generators ===
Diagram of a chemical oxygen generator system

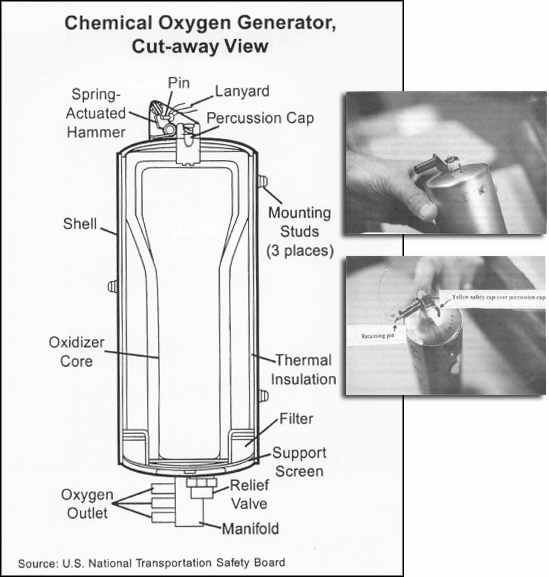
Chemical Oxygen Generator, Cut-away View

A chemical oxygen generator is a device that releases oxygen via a chemical reaction. The oxygen source is usually an inorganic superoxide,chlorate, or perchlorate; ozonides are another promising group of oxygen sources. The generators are usually ignited by a firing pin, and the chemical reaction is usually exothermic, making the generator a potential fire hazard. Potassium superoxide was used as an oxygen source on early crewed missions of the Soviet space program.

Commercial aircraft provide emergency oxygen to passengers to protect them in case of loss of cabin pressure. The cockpit crew are typically supplied from compressed oxygen cylinders. The oxidizer core is sodium chlorate (Na Cl O_{3}), which is mixed with less than 5 percent barium peroxide (Ba O_{2}) and less than 1 percent potassium perchlorate (K Cl O_{4}). The explosives in the percussion cap are a lead styphnate and tetrazene explosive mixture. The chemical reaction is exothermic and the exterior temperature of the canister will reach 260 °C (500 °F). It will produce oxygen for 12 to 22 minutes.

== Aviation ==
There are different aviation oxygen systems and delivery methods available depending on the specific application. The oxygen source may be chemical oxygen generators, high pressure portable gaseous oxygen storage systems (gas cylinders), on-board oxygen generating systems (oxygen concentrators), or liquid oxygen systems.

Chemical oxygen generation is commonly used on large commercial aircraft as a source for the emergency oxygen system for passengers in pressurised cabins. The system is light and usually designed as a dispersed system to provide about 10 minutes supply of supplemental oxygen while the aircraft makes an emergency descent. The system cannot be deactivated once triggered, and must be reloaded after each use.

On-board oxygen generating systems (OBOGS) bleed compressed air from the engines, enrich the oxygen content by removing nitrogen using an oxygen concentrator, and regulate the supply to cabin pressure and temperature. They are continuously available and producing fresh gas when the engine is running.

Liquid oxygen (LOX) is used in some jet aircraft because it is lighter and requires less space than high pressure gas storage.

=== Flight crew breathing apparatus ===
Fixed protective breathing equipment (PBE) are installed for use by the flight crew, and at least one portable unit must be available at or near the flight deck for use by a crew member. additional portable protective breathing equipment must be available for crew members for fighting fires in any compartments accessible in flight. Equipment must be available for the maximum number of crew members likely to be in the area during flight.

The PBE must protect the user from smoke, carbon dioxide, and other harmful gases while on flight deck duty or fighting a fire, and must include a mask covering the eyes, nose and mouth (full facepiece) or the nose and mouth (orinasal mask) with additional eye protection. The facepiece must allow effective communication with other crew members and use of radio equipment. The eye protection must allow glasses to be worn and not adversely affect vision.

The equipment must supply breathing gas for all users for at least 15 minutes at a cabin altitude of 8,000 ft at a respiratory minute volume of 30 liters per minute, either by continuous flow or via a demand system, and must not cause a significant increase in oxygen content of the local environment.

=== Aircraft emergency oxygen systems ===
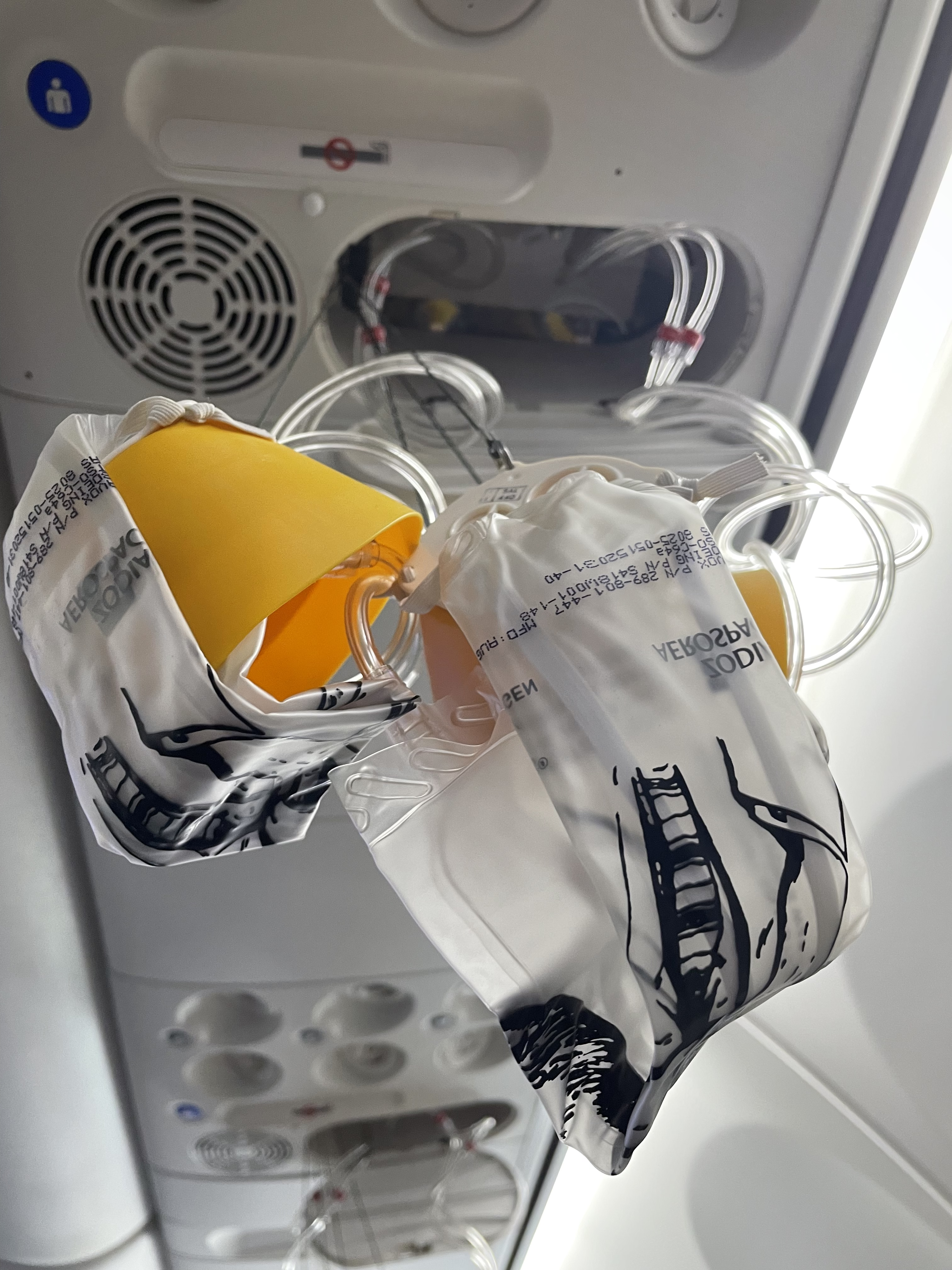
Deployed passenger emergency oxygen system masks

Aircraft emergency oxygen systems or air masks are emergency equipment fitted to pressurized commercial aircraft, intended for use when the cabin pressurisation system has failed and the cabin altitude has climbed above a safe level. It consists of a number of individual yellow oxygen masks stored in compartments near passenger seats and near areas like lavatories and galleys, and an oxygen source or sources, like a centralized high pressure gaseous oxygen cylinder or decentralized chemical oxygen generators.

== High-altitude mountaineering ==
High-altitude climbing usually requires the use of portable oxygen apparatus when climbing Mount Everest or the other eight-thousanders, though some mountaineers—and alpine style climbers in particular—have deliberately ascended Everest without oxygen (e.g. starting with Reinhold Messner in 1978). The apparatus can be open-circuit (supplementary) or closed-circuit; the 1953 British Mount Everest expedition used both types.

Although there is considerable similarity in the basic conditions in which aviation and mountaineering breathing apparatus is used, there are differences sufficient to make directly transferable use of equipment generally impracticable. One of the major considerations is that, unlike the aviator, the mountaineer cannot quickly descend to a safe altitude if the equipment fails, so it must be reliable. Another is that the mountaineer must personally carry the breathing apparatus, so the advantage gained by breathing supplemental oxygen must exceed the disadvantage of carrying the extra bulk and weight of the equipment. Other requirements are that the added work of breathing must be low, the equipment must function at low temperatures, and conservation of heat and moisture are desirable. The altitude range for mountaineering is also limited, there are no requirements for pressurisation.

The theoretically available delivery systems are: a constant flow system without reservoir, which is simple and reliable, but extremely wasteful, a constant flow system with reservoir, which when matched to the user demand is more efficient than simple constant flow, and is also relatively simple and reliable, a demand valve system, which automatically follows user demand, but also wastes a significant part of inhaled gas on dead space, a pulse dose demand system, which wastes less gas on dead space, but relies on a relatively complex control system which introduces reliability issues, or a closed circuit system, which is very efficient, but requires a carbon dioxide scrubber, which is bulky and heavy, and is sensitive to freezing when not in constant use. The constant flow system using a reservoir mask has been used mostly because it is relatively reliable.

=== Systems in use ===
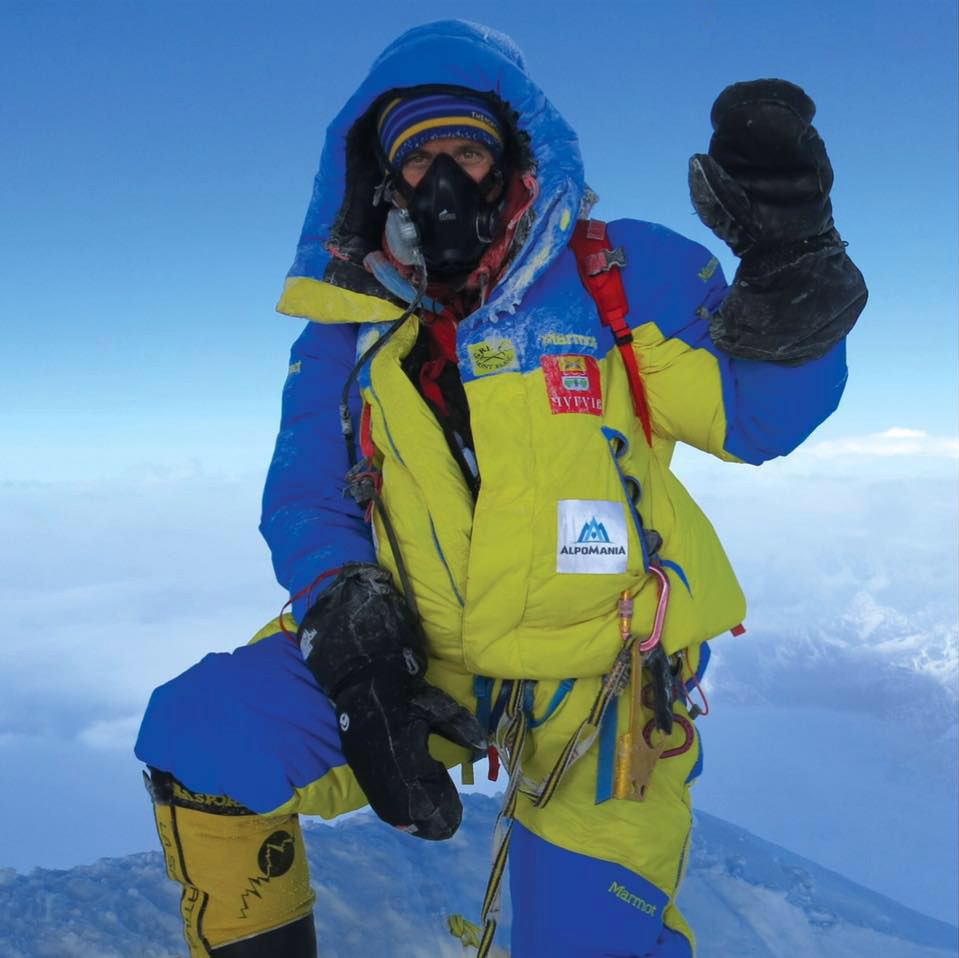
Climber wearing an oxygen mask on the summit of Everest, 2019

A commonly used system manufactured by Poisk uses three high-pressure composite cylinders filled to 260 Bar at 20 degrees Celsius. The dimensions of the cylinders are 19 inches (480 mm) long, 4.25 inches (108 mm) diameter, and weight under 2.7 kilograms (6.0 lb). At a two-liter per minute flow the cylinders last approximately 6.5 hours each. Internal volume (water capacity) is quoted by Poisk at 3 to 4 litres. Two types of breathing mask are used. One is for climbing and the other for rest and sleep, which includes a heat and humidity exchanger. These masks seal against different areas of skin on the face to reduce contact pressure problems. Both types of mask use a reservoir bag which can economise on oxygen consumption when the flow rate is set correctly for the current breathing rate by ensuring that the reservoir bag fully deflates at the end of inhalation and fully inflates by the end of exhalation. Some field user maintenance is possible using the spare parts kit. The schematic diagram indicates a partial rebreather mask type.

The Poisk regulator is a constant flow device which can be adjusted between 1 and 4 litres per minute in 0.25 litre per minute increments. It has a mass of 0.35 kg.

The Summit system used a small mask with nasal cannula and delivered oxygen in pulses, activated by the pressure drop at the start of inhalation. This is an efficient system for gas use, and less gas needs to be carried, but it relies on electronics and batteries which do not last well in the low temperatures. It also less bulky and obstructs the view less than the rebreather mask systems The system was found to be unreliable and Summit reverted to the constant flow system. The silicone cannula is still available as a medical component.

The Summit Oxygen system marketed in 2023 uses a constant flow regulator with steps of 0.5 litres per minute up to a maximum of 4 litres per minute. An innovation is that the flow rate selector is on the supply hose where it can be reached easily and therefore is likely to be adjusted more frequently to suit current exertion, thereby making more efficient use of the oxygen. The cylinders used are 4 litre 300 bar with a mass of 3.89 kg when full. An ambient air inlet valve prevents inhaling ambient air until the oxygen in the reservoir has been inhaled, and the exhaust valve provides enough back pressure to divert exhaled gas to the reservoir bag at the beginning of exhalation, when it contains very little carbon dioxide as it was in physiological dead space.

== History of mountaineering breathing apparatus ==
Oxygen equipment used on the 1922 expedition

=== 1920s and 1930s ===
British expeditions all used open-circuit oxygen apparatus, as advocated by pioneer climbers George Finch, Noel Odell and Peter Lloyd. Open-circuit oxygen apparatus was trialled on the 1922 and 1924 British Everest expeditions; the bottled oxygen taken by the 1921 expedition was not used. The carrying frame for open circuit oxygen designed by George Finch and used in 1922 and 1924 with four cylinders of oxygen weighed 32 lb (14.5 kg). With Geoffrey Bruce, Finch reached 27,250 feet on Mount Everest in 1922.

Climbers sometimes carried only two cylinders each. Four cylinders contained a total of 960 litres of oxygen, which would last for eight hours at the standard rate of 2 litres per minute or seven hours at 2.2 L/min. The attempt on Everest by George Mallory and Andrew Irvine in 1924 was the first summit attempt using oxygen on Everest. Mallory and Irvine carried two cylinders each.

The 1938 British Mount Everest expedition trialled closed-circuit as well as open-circuit apparatus, but the closed-circuit apparatus was not successful.

=== First ascent of Everest ===
In 1953 the first assault party of Tom Bourdillon and Charles Evans used closed-circuit oxygen rebreathers, which had been developed by Bourdillon and his father, and climbed at unprecedented speed to within 90 m of the summit, but did not reach it as one of the rebreathers failed when the scrubber was refilled.Their ability to climb so fast has been attributed to the physiological advantage of breathing pure oxygen supplied by the rebreathers. Other climbers used similar equipment in the 1930s to 1950s but the available rebreathers were found to be too heavy and uncomfortable for mountaineering, lighter open circuit equipment was developed, and closed circuit was ignored for the next 50 years.

Two days after Bourdillon and Evans, the second assault party of Edmund Hillary and Tenzing Norgay reached the summit with a much improved 22 lb open circuit continuous flow system. After ten minutes taking photographs on the summit without using his oxygen set, Hillary said he "was becoming rather clumsy-fingered and slow-moving".

John Hunt considered that two assault parties using the experimental closed-circuit type was too risky despite users having achieved a faster climbing rate and also potentially having a greater range for a given supply (so that it might be possible to reach the summit from a camp on the South Col). Hence he proposed one closed-circuit assault followed shortly by an open-circuit assault (and a third assault if necessary). The cylinders used were dural light-alloy cylinders holding 800 litres or RAF steel wire-wound cylinders holding 1,400 litres of oxygen (both at 3,300 p.s.i.; 227.5 bar or 22.75 MPa). The expedition had 8 closed-circuit and 12 open-circuit sets; the open-circuit set used 1 RAF cylinder or 1, 2 or 3 dural cylinders; with total set weight 28 lb, 18 lb, 29 1/2lb or 41 lb (12.7, 8.2, 13.4 or 18.6 kg). Sleepers above 21,500 feet (6,600 m) used "night oxygen" at 1 litre/minute; and with adaptors they could use oxygen from tanks by Drägerwerk the Swiss had left behind in 1952. Both open-circuit and closed-circuit sets iced up; the closed-circuit sets when a new and cold soda-lime canister was inserted.

Physiologist Griffith Pugh had also been on the 1952 British Cho Oyu expedition to study the effects of cold and altitude. Pugh and Michael Ward made the following recommendations for 1953, based on experiments carried out on Menlung La at 20,000 feet (6,100 m) in 1952:

- The more oxygen breathed the greater the subjective benefit
- The weight to a large extent offset increased performance
- The minimum required was a flow rate of 4 litres/minute. Prewar 1 then briefly (1 or 2 minutes) 2 litres/minute (1924; Odell etc.) or 2.25 litres/minute (1922 Finch & Bruce) & (1938, Lloyd & Warren) had been used
- There was a great reduction in pulmonary ventilation
- There was a great relief in the feeling of heaviness and fatigue in the legs (although it was not tested whether endurance was improved).

They also noted a great variation between individuals with some men not able to go above 21,000 feet (6,400 m), probably only exceptional men able to go above 27,000 feet (8,200 m) without supplemental oxygen, and few men can go above 26,000 feet (7,900 m) twice in an expedition. Performance was somewhat better than anticipated from 1952; the principal effect was to increase the work done in a day, and great improvement in their subjective state so having greater appreciation of the surroundings. The sense of well-being continued for an hour or more after oxygen was discontinued. Pugh also recommended acclimatising above 15,000 feet (4,600 m) for at least 36 days, and the use of closed-circuit equipment.

=== Post-Everest 1953 ===
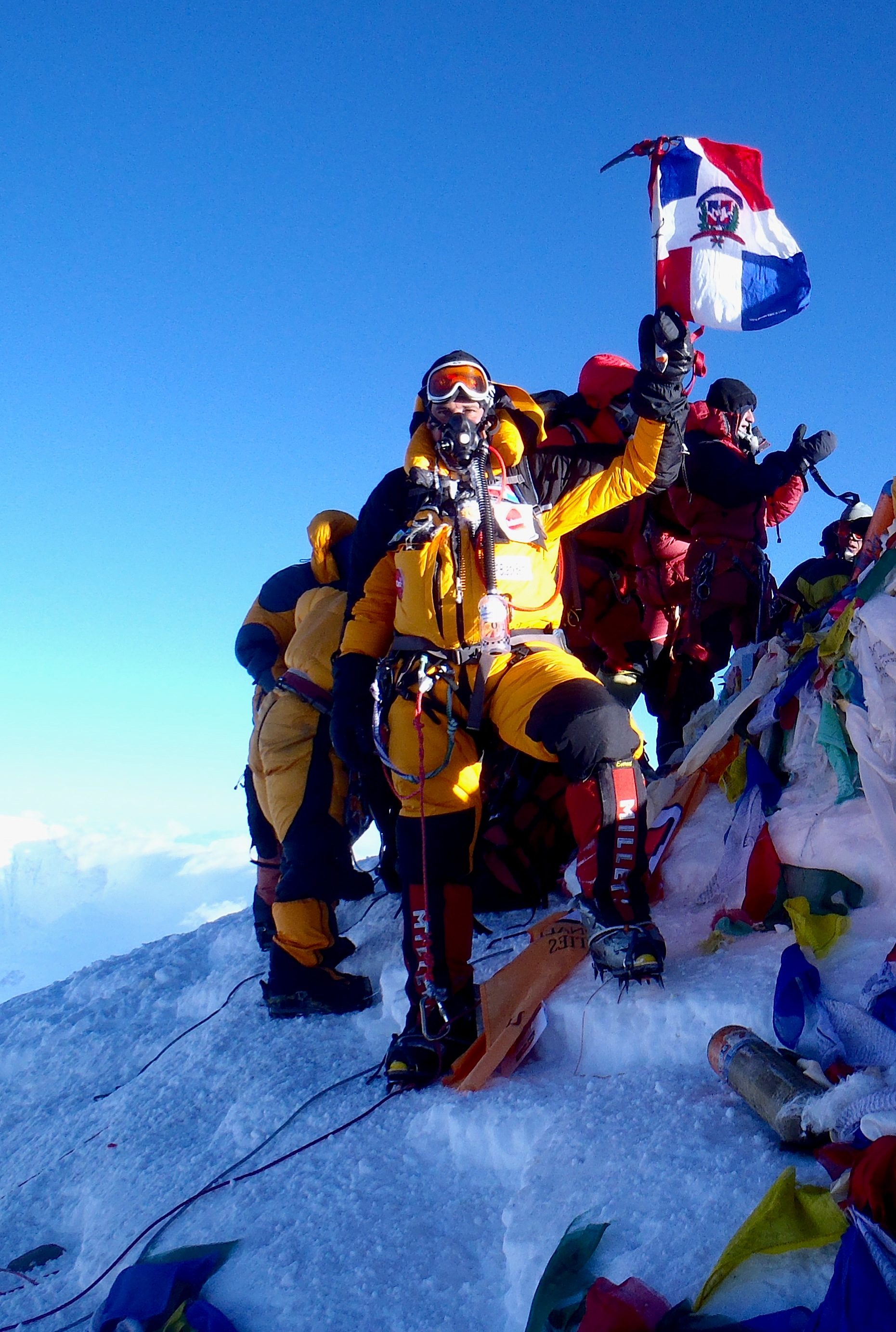
Climber on the summit of Everest wearing an oxygen mask

US Navy doctor and mountaineer Tom Hornbein modified the design of a breathing mask used by Navy pilots which was manufactured by Maytag for the 1963 American expedition. This was a non-rebreather mask which had a single non-return valve to prevent backflow into the reservoir bag which accumulated oxygen from a constant flow regulator, and delivered it at the start of inhalation. As of 2013 this basic design is still used for open circuit mountaineering breathing sets

On 8 May 1978, Reinhold Messner and Peter Habeler made the first ascent of Mount Everest without supplemental oxygen. Messner had ascended all 14 "eight-thousanders" without supplemental oxygen by 1986.

Running out of bottled oxygen was noted as a factor in the 1979 deaths of Ray Genet and Hannelore Schmatz on Mount Everest.

Russian manufacturer Poisk has supplied breathing apparatus since 1982, using a small and lightweight titanium and kevlar filament wound cylinder of 3.5 kg with an endurance of 6 hours at 2 litres per minute, with regulators that could be adjusted in increments of 0.25 litres per minute up to 4 litres per minute. The multiple small cylinders allow for caching.

International Mountain Guides chose a larger cylinder in 1991 which could supply oxygen for 10 hours at 3 litres per minute.

By the 21st century one of the popular oxygen systems on Mount Everest used carbon-fiber reinforced aluminum bottles, with a 3-liter cylinder of oxygen weighing 7 pounds (3.2 kg) (3.2 kg) when filled up at 3,000 pounds per square inch (210 bar).

In 2003, Summit Oxygen introduced an experimental system with nasal cannula and demand pulse system with electrical control using a battery, but the flow rate was insufficient for the demand, and they returned to the more traditional continuous flow partial rebreather mask system.

The TopOut mask was introduced in 2004, based on the 3M R6311 respirator facepiece.

Of over 6500 Everest summits as of 2013, less than 100 were without oxygen.

=== Equipment reliability ===
There have been a significant number of deaths on Everest which have been associated with breathing apparatus failures. On a single expedition in 2019, nine breathing sets failed on the same day, but the group was already descending and by sharing equipment managed to avoid fatalities. The failures were not officially investigated for cause and mechanism, but witnesses claim that over the preceding two decades at least 21 other cases of dangerous breathing equipment failure have occurred. This should be considered in the perspective of the total number of ascents using oxygen, which exceed 6500, so a failure rate of critical life support equipment of about 0.5% at first estimate. The New York Times reported that equipment maintenance and refilling practices are questionable. The equipment manufacturers, quite reasonably, do not accept responsibility for cylinders not filled by their own facilities, and it is not recorded whether any of the failures were of factory fills. What is known, is that the cylinders are often refilled locally. Modes of failure reported include cylinder leaks, regulator malfunction, and operator error by inexperienced climbers. It is likely that most of the failures were of Poisk equipment, mainly because that is by far the most common brand in use, but Summit Oxygen regulators have also been reported to fail. Both Poisk and Summit Oxygen have a generally good reputation for quality. The New York Times article suggests that lack of regulation in the industry in Nepal and poor equipment maintenance may be a cause of the problem.

== See also ==
- Altitude sickness – Medical condition due to rapid exposure to low oxygen at high altitude
- Bottled oxygen – Equipment which allows the user to breathe at hypoxic altitudes
- Death zone – Altitudes above about 8,000 m (26,000 ft)
- Decompression sickness – Disorder caused by dissolved gases forming bubbles in tissues
- Effects of high altitude on humans – Environmental effects on physiology and mental health
- Eight-thousander – Mountain peaks of over 8,000 metres in elevation
- High-altitude pulmonary edema – Human disease (HAPE)
- Commercial climbing in Mount Everest
- Oxygen tank – Storage vessel for oxygen
- Rebreather – Portable apparatus to recycle breathing gas
