= Edward Lisle Strutt =

British mountain climber (1874–1948)

Lt. Col. Edward Strutt CBE DSO
- Born: Edward Lisle Strutt; 8 February 1874
- Died: 7 July 1948 (aged 74)
- Education: Christ Church, Oxford
- Spouse: Florence Nina (m. 1905)
- Children: 0
- Military career
- Allegiance: United Kingdom
- Branch: British Army
- Rank: Lieutenant colonel
- Unit: Royal Scots
- Conflicts: Second Boer War; First World War

Lieutenant-Colonel Edward Lisle Strutt, CBE, DSO (8 February 1874 – 7 July 1948), was a British soldier and mountaineer, and President of the Alpine Club from 1935 to 1938. After a distinguished military career he defended classical mountaineering against what he saw as unhelpful trends in the sport for speed.

== Family ==
Strutt was the son of the Hon. Arthur Strutt and his wife, Alice Mary Elizabeth Philips de Lisle. His paternal grandfather was the 1st Baron Belper. On 10 October 1905, he married Florence Nina, daughter of John Robert Hollond, MP, DL, of Wonham, Bampton, Devon. They had no children.

== Education and military life ==
Strutt was educated at Beaumont College, Windsor, then at Christ Church, Oxford, and the University of Innsbruck. He joined the part-time 3rd (Militia) Battalion, Royal Scots (Lothian Regiment) as a lieutenant (30 August 1899), and was promoted to captain on 20 February 1900. The battalion was embodied in late December 1899 for service during the Second Boer War, and in early March 1900 left Queenstown in County Cork on the SS Oriental for South Africa. In July 1901 he commanded a detachment of the battalion involved in the first organised "drive" towards the Modder River that attempted to trap the Boers. The detachment spent three nights camped at over 9,000 feet (2,700 m), and afterwards took part in the night attack that captured Commandant Marais at his laager. Strutt was mentioned in dispatches. Strutt left Cape Town for the United Kingdom with most of the battalion in May 1902, shortly before the end of the war. He later served in the First World War, gaining many decorations and attaining the rank of lieutenant-colonel in the Royal Scots.

Strutt commanded a detachment of soldiers from the Honourable Artillery Company that escorted the family of Charles I, the last Austro-Hungarian Emperor-King, to safety in Switzerland in 1919, after having served as the family's protector at Eckartsau on the personal initiative of King George V. Strutt was also involved in a Hungarian Habsburg restoration bid in February 1921 and as a communication link between the Habsburg Imperial and Royal couple aboard HMS Cardiff, on their way to exile in Madeira, and their children in Switzerland in November 1921.

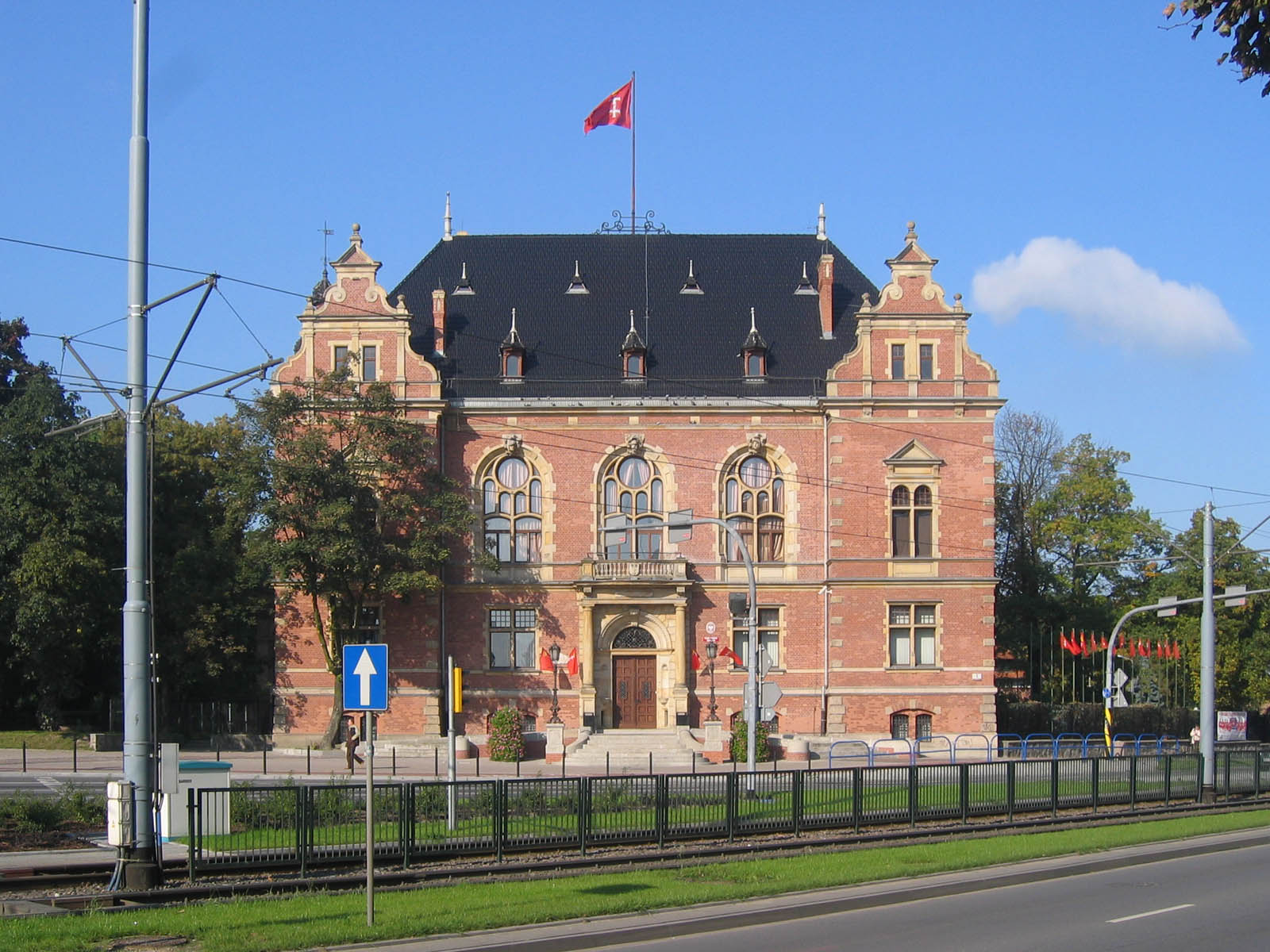
Seat of League of Nations High Commissioner for the Free City of Danzig

In 1920, Strutt was appointed League of Nations High Commissioner of the Free City of Danzig (Polish: Wolne Miasto Gdańsk), a city known in Polish as Gdańsk.

== Alpinism ==
Strutt had numerous mountaineering expeditions to Tyrol, Ötztal, the Stubai Alps and the Karwendel range. From 1892 the family employed Beatrice Tomasson as a governess. Despite Tommason being fifteen years older than Strutt the family believed they were romantically involved. Tomasson became a member of the Austrian Alpine Club in 1893 and began to attempt major climbs in the Dolomites from 1896 onwards.

Strutt was climbing leader and deputy to expedition leader C. G. Bruce on the 1922 British expedition to Mount Everest that included George Finch and George Mallory. Strutt proved to be an unpopular member of the party, being thought of as 'pompous and pontificating'. The expedition was called off when an avalanche killed seven Sherpa climbers.

Strutt was editor of the Alpine Journal from 1927 to 1937, these being the years – according to Alan Hankinson – in which 'the Alpine Club [...] had declined into a stuffy, snobbish, backward-looking institution.' Hankinson added:

Its dominant figure was Colonel E. L. Strutt [...] for many years the autocratic and outspoken editor of the Alpine Journal. His views were rigid and intolerant. The only decent and honourable way to climb was the way in which he had climbed as a young man. Crampons were inadmissible; pitons anathema.

As editor, Strutt published a number of attacks on what he saw as the insidious modern trends in mountaineering, more often than not on the part of the Germans. Although Strutt had words of praise for those climbers (on expeditions to peaks such as Kangchenjunga and Nanga Parbat) whom he perceived as climbing in the classical tradition – 'We yield to no one in admiration for the German overseas parties led by Rickmers [de], Bauer, Borchers [de], Merkl, and others. The modesty of these parties have been excelled only by their skill' – he had a different reaction to climbers using modern tactics in the Alps. He continued in this article from the 1935 Alpine Journal:

But for the present-day German mountaineer in the Alps, wonder replaces admiration. There is no lack of skill – on rocks at any rate – but judgement and even an elementary knowledge of the ethics of mountaineering are often conspicuously absent. In these pages it has been too frequently our task to relate some unjustifiable exploit and, in the same number, to record the inevitable disaster accruing to the perpetrator. While regretting the folly of it all, we mourn the loss of promising lives.

The trend towards climbing (and descending) the great peaks at great speed also disgusted Strutt. On hearing of an American who had hired a guide to take him up and down the Matterhorn in five hours, Strutt commented that this was the kind of crime 'for which the death penalty is inadequate'.

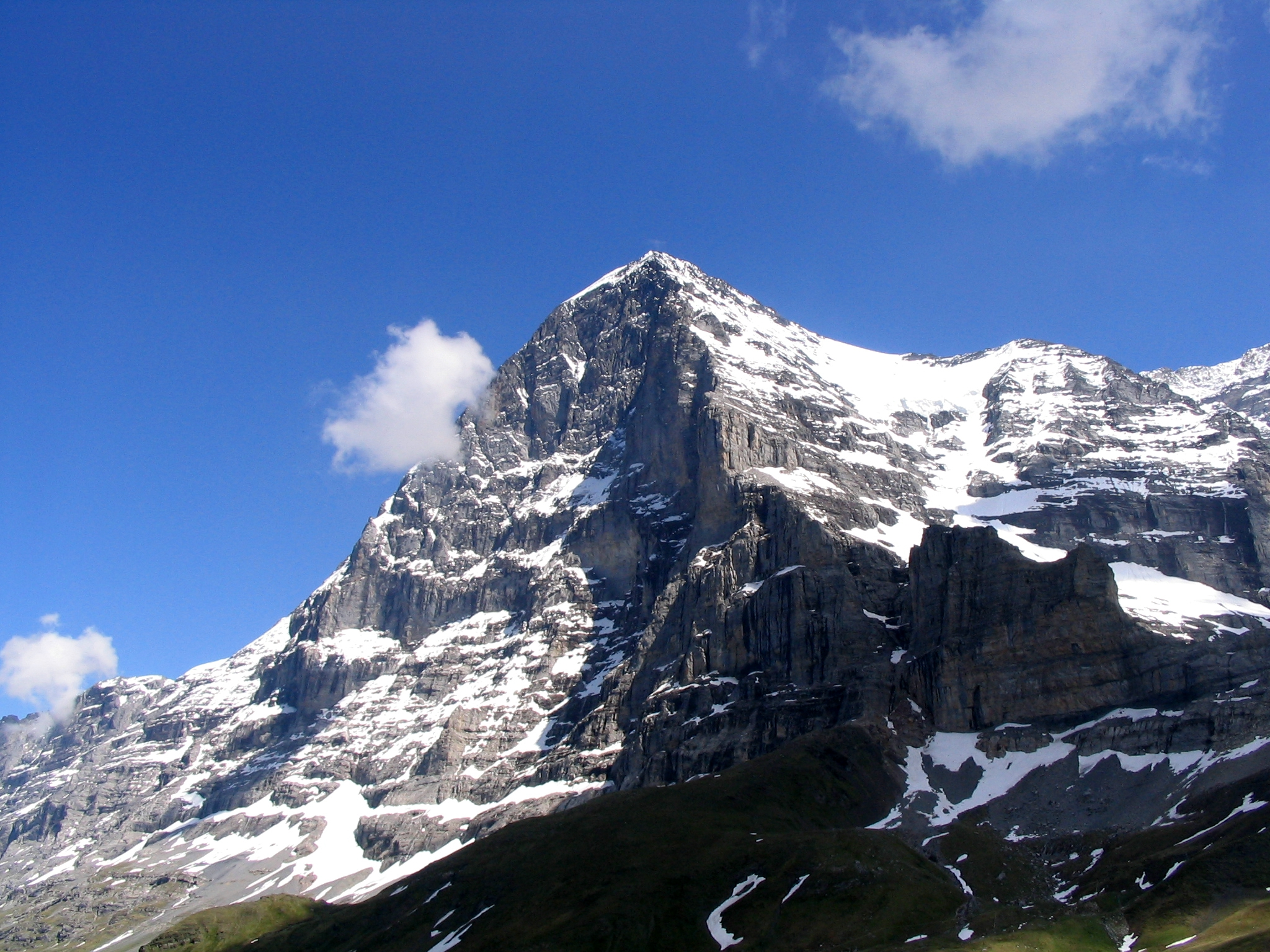
The north face of the Eiger

The ongoing attempts on the north face of the Eiger (the Eigerwand) – which had thus far resisted all efforts, and had taken the lives of six German and Austrian climbers – were a particular object of his disdain, provoking his most notorious outburst (in his 1938 Presidential Valedictory Address to the Alpine Club, just before the first successful ascent by Anderl Heckmair and party):

The Eigerwand – still unclimbed – continues to be an obsession for the mentally deranged of almost every nation. He who first succeeds may rest assured that he has accomplished the most imbecile variant since mountaineering first began.

== Decorations ==
- Queen's South Africa Medal and four clasps, King's South Africa Medal and two clasps (Second Boer War)
- Companion of the Distinguished Service Order (DSO) in 1918
- Chevalier, Order of Leopold (Belgium)
- Chevalier, Order of Romania
- Croix de Guerre (Belgium)
- Croix de Guerre (France) with four palms
- Officer, Légion d'honneur
- Commander, Order of the British Empire (CBE) in 1919
- Mentioned in despatches four times

== Bibliography ==
- T. S. Blakeney, "The Alpine Journal and Its Editors III, 1927–52"
