= Geoffrey Bruce =

British Indian Army officer, mountaineer (1896-1972)

- Bruce (left) and Finch in 1922
- Born: John Geoffrey Bruce; 4 December 1896
- Died: 31 January 1972 (aged 75)
- Occupation: Military officer
- Known for: Mount Everest expeditions
- Spouse: Marjorie Isabel Crump
- Parent: Colonel Sir Gerald Bruce
- Military career
- Allegiance: United Kingdom
- Branch: British Indian Army
- Service years: 1914–1948
- Rank: Major General
- Service number: 106232
- Commands: Lahore District (1946–47); 17th Indian Infantry Brigade (1940–41); 2nd Battalion 6th Gurkha Rifles (1937–38)
- Conflicts: First World War; Third Anglo-Afghan War; North-West Frontier; Second World War
- Awards: Companion of the Order of the Bath; Distinguished Service Order; Military Cross; Order of the Star of Nepal

Major General John Geoffrey Bruce, CB, DSO, MC (4 December 1896 – 31 January 1972) was an officer in the British Indian Army, eventually becoming Deputy Chief of General Staff, who participated in the 1922 British Mount Everest expedition. Bruce, who had never before climbed a mountain, had been appointed as a transport officer, but chance led to him accompanying George Finch on the only summit attempt that used supplemental oxygen. Together they set a new mountaineering world record height of 27,300 ft (8,321 m), only 1,731.7 ft (527.82 m) below the summit of Mount Everest. He also took part in the 1924 British Mount Everest expedition, and for a time was slated to make the first summit attempt with George Mallory, before the party was forced to retreat and Mallory subsequently went for the top with Sandy Irvine.

== Background and personal life ==
Geoffrey Bruce was born on 4 December 1896, a son of Colonel Sir Gerald Bruce. He attended Rugby School. Bruce married Marjorie Isabel Crump in 1932 and they had two daughters. (Note: Marjorie also had two older daughters by a previous marriage.) In 1922 he was described by his mountaineering colleague George Finch as "tall, of athletic build, strong, endowed with a great fund of mental energy – an invaluable asset on ventures of this kind – and cheerful in any situation". Wade Davis said Bruce was, in 1922, "one of the finest athletes in the Indian Army".

== Military career ==
During the First World War, Bruce was second lieutenant in the Glamorgan Yeomanry serving in Egypt and Palestine.

As an officer of the British Indian Army, Bruce took part in the Third Anglo-Afghan War of 1919, and in 1921 he was awarded the Military Cross. He participated in the North-West Frontier Province operations between 1920 and 1923, and again between 1937 and 1938. He attended the Staff College, Quetta, from 1927 to 1928, and his fellow students included Frederick Morgan, Harold Briggs, George Vasey, E. L. M. Burns, David Cowan and Horace Birks. He then attended the RAF Staff College, Andover, in 1932, before returning to the Staff College, Quetta, this time as an instructor, from 1933 to 1936. Bruce was appointed commanding officer of the 2nd Battalion 6th Gurkha Rifles in 1937.

Bruce had a distinguished career during the Second World War, at the beginning of which he was attending the Imperial Defence College in London, serving in Norway and France in 1940, before returning to India to command the 17th Indian Infantry Brigade at the time of its formation. From 1944 to 1946 he was Deputy Chief of the General Staff of the British Indian Army, and was then General Officer Commanding of the Lahore District until his retirement in 1948. He was Commandant of the Civil Defence Staff College from 1952 to 1956.

== 1922 Mount Everest expedition ==
Oxygen equipment used on the expedition

In 1922, at the age of 25, Bruce had no mountaineering experience except for hill scrambling in the North-West Frontier, but he was invited by his cousin General Charles Bruce, the leader of that year's Everest expedition, to take part as third transport officer and interpreter. This was the first expedition with the specific aim of reaching the summit of the world's highest mountain.

While the expedition was ascending the East Rongbuk Glacier at an elevation of about 21,000 ft (6,401 m), many of the climbers and porters were suffering from dysentery and the effects of altitude, but Bruce maintained his full fitness. It had been intended that one of the assaults on the summit would be led by George Finch, using oxygen equipment. Bruce was willing to cooperate, although this sort of artificial aid was regarded with scepticism or even disdain by many members of the party. Finch was taken ill and, by the time he recovered, all the other lead climbers had set off higher up the mountain, so Finch had to assemble a team of untrained climbers.

Noel filming from the North Col

On 24 May Finch and Bruce, accompanied by Tejbir Bura, an NCO Gurkha Army colleague of Bruce's, set off with a group of porters to reach the North Col. (Note: Finch gives a highly-readable account of the summit attempt (available online) in The Assault on Mount Everest, 1922.) John Noel accompanied them as far as the Col to photograph and film progress. The next day, Finch, Bruce, and Tejbir climbed higher up towards the North Shoulder and camped the following night in hurricane conditions. After being forced to stay in camp the next day, they at last set off again, but Tejbir, at the point of collapse, had to return to the tent. To keep slightly sheltered from the strengthening wind, they started to traverse the North Face, without using ropes so as to save time. Suddenly the glass T-piece of Bruce's oxygen set broke, but Finch was able to replace it while they shared Finch's oxygen. After that, Bruce was unable to go higher and so, within a half-mile (0.8 km) of the summit, they turned back.

Three days earlier, the team of George Mallory, Teddy Norton, and Howard Somervell, not using supplemental oxygen, had turned back at 26,985 ft (8,225 m) and now, on 27 May 1922, Finch and Bruce had set another world record height of 27,300 ft (8,321 m), only 1,731.7 ft (527.82 m) below the summit; it was Bruce's first mountain climb. (Note: Davis (2012) wrote, "Their elevation was 27,300 feet – the highest that man had ever climbed", and, "Geoffrey Bruce ... had set a world height record on his very first mountain climb". Charles Bruce (1923) wrote, "First, although Geoffrey Bruce is thoroughly accustomed to work on the hillside, he had never before this big attempt, and before the few practice walks that he had with Finch, attempted a snow mountain in his life; the nearest thing he had been to it was following game in Kashmir".)

Finch and Bruce descending from their record climb

In violent wind, they eventually got back to the North Col where Noel, fearing that no one could survive for so long in such conditions, had been burning unexposed film to act as flares to guide them. Bruce's feet were completely numb and Finch feared they might be lost to frostbite, although Bruce staged a full recovery and was able to return to his regiment later in the year. Douglas Freshfield later described the climb as "one of the bravest mountaineering feats on record". Bruce wrote to Finch, "I can never thank you enough for electing to take me with you on that climb, or for the perfectly astonishing way you pulled me through it all. It was wonderful". At the 1924 Winter Olympics, Bruce was one of the thirteen members of the expedition awarded an Olympic gold medal. (Note: Medals were awarded to a further eight members of the team at the 1924 Summer Olympics)

== 1924 and later Everest expeditions ==
The next Everest expedition, which took place in 1924, was also led by General Charles Bruce, and this time Captain Geoffrey Bruce was one of the main climbers as well as being transport officer. General Bruce was taken ill with malaria on the march in and had to be evacuated to India, with Teddy Norton taking over as leader. During the march in, it had been decided to pair Bruce with Noel Odell to make the expedition's desired third attempt on the summit (with oxygen). Later, on the East Rongbuk glacier, after bad weather had driven everyone back to base camp and a second approach was being made, the plan was for Mallory and Bruce to establish Camp V at about 7,800 metres (25,500 ft) and then make the first summit bid.

Camp V went according to plan on 1 June, but the porters could not be persuaded to climb farther and everyone retreated back to the North Col. Norton and Somervell made a summit attempt on 4 June and managed to climb higher than Bruce and Finch had done in 1922. (Note: Norton and Somervell reached 8,573 metres (28,126 ft), setting a record that was to last until the Swiss expedition of 1952.) Mallory launched a third attempt on 8 June but this time he chose Sandy Irvine as climbing partner. When Mallory and Irvine failed to return, the expedition was called off.

Bruce was later invited to be the leader of the Everest expedition of 1933 and of 1935, but was unable to accept due to his army commitments.
