= George Finch (chemist) =

Australian chemist and mountaineer

George Finch MBE FRS
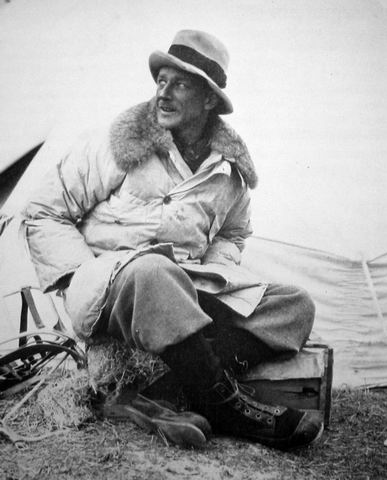
- Born: George Ingle Finch; 4 August 1888; Orange, New South Wales, Australia
- Died: 22 November 1970 (aged 82); England
- Education: University of Geneva
- Known for: British Mount Everest Expedition 1922
- Awards: Fellow of the Royal Society; Hughes Medal (1944)
- Scientific career
- Fields: Chemical physics Electrochemistry
- Workplaces: Imperial College London

George Ingle Finch (4 August 1888 – 22 November 1970) was a British-Australian chemist and mountaineer. His obituary in The Times describes him as "one of the two best alpinists of his time" (with George Mallory).

== Education and military service ==
He was born in Orange, New South Wales, Australia to British parents, Charles Edward and Laura Isabel (née Black) Finch, educated in German-speaking Switzerland, and studied physical sciences at the University of Geneva. He began studying medicine in Paris (where he scaled the walls of Notre Dame with his brother) but decided he preferred the physical sciences.

During the First World War, he served with the Royal Army Ordnance Corps. He was appointed a Member of the Order of the British Empire in the 1918 New Year Honours for services in connection with the War in France, Egypt and Salonika. In the Second World War he investigated fire defence.

== Career ==
A member of the second British expedition under General Charles Granville Bruce to Mount Everest, on 27 May 1922 Finch, Captain Geoffrey Bruce and Tejbir Bura set out from their high camp at 24,480 ft (7,460 m) using the rudimentary oxygen equipment that Finch was responsible for. Finch and Bruce reached an elevation of 27,300 ft (8,320 m) on the North Face, the highest point that any climber had ever reached. At that point they decided that they must descend. Finch fell out with the Everest Committee after 1922. George Mallory described Finch as having "built a psychological wall around himself, inside which he lives." The pioneering work on oxygen apparatus by Finch, which he pursued with messianic zeal, remained crucial to future expeditions. In the Alps, Finch was on the first ascent of the North Face Diagonal or "Finch Route" on the Dent d'Hérens, which he climbed with T. G. B. (Guy) Forster and Raymond Peto on 2 August 1923. Finch was also a keen skier and was a founding member of the Alpine Ski Club in 1908. He was a lifelong advocate and supporter of the Alpine Club and was its president for 1959–1961.

Between 1936 and 1952, Finch held the position of Professor of Applied Physical Chemistry at Imperial College London.

He was elected a Fellow of the Royal Society in 1938. His candidacy citation read:

"Distinguished for his knowledge of Chemical Physics and Electrochemistry, and particularly for his researches upon the electrical conditions and structure of catalytic surfaces, the mechanism of ignition and combustion in electrical discharges, and upon electron diffraction and its applications to the study of surface structure. His outstanding skill in the design of instruments and experimental methods has enabled him greatly to increase the accuracy of measurements in connection with electron diffraction and cathode-ray oscillography. The result of his researches have been published in some 50 papers, including many in the Society's Proceedings."

Finch was awarded their Hughes Medal in 1944. He was president of the Physical Society from 1947 to 1949.

== Personal life ==
Finch was first married to Alicia "Betty" Fisher of London. By the time he returned from the front in 1917, Fisher had given birth to a son from a relationship with another man, Wentworth "Jock" Campbell, an Indian Army officer. That boy was the future Oscar-winning film actor Peter Finch.

George separated the infant from his mother and had his relatives raise him as his own son, even though he was not the biological father. Peter did not see his parents again until he returned to Britain and found fame in his thirties. He remained close to his mother and met George Finch and his biological father briefly.

George divorced Betty when Peter was two years old and married Gladys May, a nurse, after she became pregnant with their son Bryan. George left Gladys and the boy soon after the birth, but supported Bryan financially.

On 27 December 1921, George married Agnes Johnston, whom he called "Bubbles". The marriage lasted and they had three daughters: Joyce Nanette in 1923 (known as "Bunty"), Paola Jean in 1924 and Felice George (known as "Colette") in 1929.
