= Charles Granville Bruce =

British Army general & mountaineer (1866-1939)

- Bruce as leader of the 1922 Everest expedition
- Born: 7 April 1866; London, England
- Died: 12 July 1939 (aged 73); London, England
- Relatives: Henry Bruce, 1st Baron Aberdare (father); General Sir William Francis Patrick Napier (grandfather)
- Military career
- Allegiance: United Kingdom
- Branch: British Indian Army
- Rank: Brigadier-General
- Commands: 1st Battalion, 6th Gurkha Rifles
- Conflicts: First World War
- Awards: Companion of the Order of the Bath; Member of the Royal Victorian Order

Signature
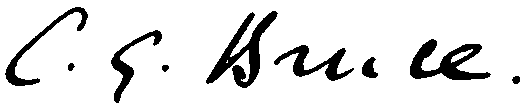

Brigadier-General Charles Granville Bruce, CB, MVO (7 April 1866 – 12 July 1939) was a senior British Indian Army officer and a veteran Himalayan mountaineer and leader of the second and third British expeditions to Mount Everest in 1922 and 1924. In recognition of the former he was awarded a special prize at the conclusion of the first ever Winter Olympics.

== Background and early life ==
Charles Granville Bruce was the youngest of the fourteen children of Henry Bruce, 1st Baron Aberdare (1815–1895) and Norah Napier (1827–1897). His mother was the youngest daughter of General Sir William Francis Patrick Napier.

Bruce was educated at Harrow and Repton. His early life alternated between Queen's Gate, London, the family home in Aberdare, Wales, and a Scottish estate. In Wales, his mentor was a local farmer and inn-keeper, who in his youth had worked as a hunter in California and British Columbia. He taught the young Bruce how to hunt, find his way around the local hills, and drink. One of Bruce's most notable achievements was running down a "rough crew" of local poachers. Half a century later he was proud to list their names in his memoirs; "Bill the Butcher, Shoni Kick-O-Top, Billie Blaen Llechau, Dick Shon Edwards & Dai Brass-Knocker". Bruce and the local game-keepers chased one poacher to the narrow alleyways and courts of Georgetown. The poacher was only caught when a furious husband found him snoring in his wife's bed and threw him out on the street. The gang were duly punished, but gained revenge by returning to Bruce's house and stealing all the weapons from his father's gun-room.

After leaving school, Bruce entered military college. He had physical strength, was an enthusiastic boxer and 300-yard runner, and in the 1880s represented England against France in an international running meeting.

In 1894 he married Finetta Madelina Julia Campbell, daughter of Sir Edward Campbell, 2nd Baronet.

== Career ==
In 1888, Bruce joined the Indian Army and became a career soldier serving with the 5th Gurkha Rifles from 1889 to 1920, rising to the rank of brigadier-general in September 1916. As a young lieutenant he was posted to Abbottabad, a British hill station in the Panjab, where he developed a passion for the locality, wrestling and climbing. Bruce had an akhara (wrestling pit) dug near his residence, where he practised on most days. Both the British and the Rajahs wagered thousands of rupees on professional wrestling matches and took pride in having the strongest sides. In the 1910s, Bruce was patron of the wrestler Rahim Sulaniwala, who went on to become a renowned champion.

Bruce took a special interest in his Gurkha soldiers and became fluent in Nepali. He introduced hill racing to his Gurkha regiment and in 1891 took his champion runner Pabir Thapa to Zermatt, in Switzerland, to learn ice-climbing. On the way there, the two stayed at Aberdare, where Thapa enjoyed "running down" poachers. Despite his poor English, he was very popular with the locals. He disappeared for the last three days of his visit and was found living it up with some coal miners in Tonypandy. Bruce went on to train the Gurkhas in mountain-warfare. In 1897 he equipped his troops on the Northern Frontier with shorts, and is widely credited with their introduction to the British Army.

Bruce's climbing experience was impressive. He spent ten climbing seasons in the European Alps and took part in three of the earliest climbing expeditions to the Himalaya. In 1892, with a troop of Gurkha soldiers he accompanied Martin Conway in his exploration of the Baltoro region of the Karakorum, visiting Muztagh Tower, Broad Peak and K2. In 1893 he was with Francis Younghusband on a mission to the Hindu Kush to bestow recognition on Nizam-uk-Mulk as Mehtar. He and Younghusband were probably the first to discuss mounting an expedition to climb Everest. In Himalayan Wanderer, Bruce says that it was Younghusband's idea. Younghusband says that it was Bruce's. In 1895, Bruce joined Albert F. Mummery and Collie in their attempt on Nanga Parbat, but he had to leave early because his army leave was up. In 1906–1907, he and Longstaff took another troop of Gurkhas to the Nanda Devi group, visiting Dunagiri and Kanchenjunga, and climbing Trisul.

It is impossible to enumerate all the peaks seen, but when I state that in a country no greater than Carmarthenshire and Glamorgan, there are some 80 peaks all in the neighbourhood of 20,000 ft… it will give an idea… of that mighty range.

In 1915, Bruce went to Gallipoli, in command of the 1st Battalion the 6th Gurkha Rifles. After two months in the front line he was severely wounded and was transferred back to India, where he commanded the Bannu Brigade on the North West Frontier from 1916 to 1919.

Between 1923 and 1925 Bruce was president of the Alpine Club. Because of his experience in the Himalaya he was appointed leader of the 1922 British Mount Everest Expedition, the first attempt to summit Everest. He was skilful in bridging the cultural divide between Sahib and Sherpa, and had long advocated training Indians in mountain techniques, with a view to forming a body of porters and guides like those in the European Alps. He called his men porters rather than coolies. He was particularly liked by the local peoples, and for the 1922 expedition collected a cohort of local men, and enthused them with an esprit de corps. He later christened an elite group of high altitude porters the "Tigers". He was universally admired by the expedition team; George Mallory in particular, liked and trusted him. Bruce was wary of oxygen apparatus, nevertheless, George Finch and Geoffrey Bruce (Charles's cousin) used oxygen to set a new altitude record of 27,300 feet on Everest, via the North Col.

Bruce was appointed leader of the next effort to summit Everest, the 1924 British Mount Everest expedition. Several stories of him survive the trip. On the trek to Tibet, two of his muleteers got drunk and bit a local Tibetan woman. As punishment he fined them, and made them carry the 36-kilogram (80 lb) "treasury" (double the normal load carried) on a three-day march. Arthur Hinks, the rather mean-spirited secretary of the expedition committee seated in London, was exasperated by the official correspondence reaching London from the Himalayas.

Captain Noel will be arriving in Darjeeling with a box forty foot long and I am currently scouring the country for an adequate mule.

Please note that I am doing my best for this expedition. I have interviewed the Viceroy, I have preached to Boy Scouts, and I have emptied the poes in a Dak Bungalow. This is the meaning of the term General. They are cheap at home, they are more expensive out here. Hurry up with that thousand [pounds] please.

Bruce contracted malaria while tiger shooting in India before the expedition, and had to be stretchered out of Tibet. Edward Felix Norton took on leadership, and would set a new height record of 8,570 m (28,120 ft) on the mountain, less than 280 m (920 ft) below the summit. Two days later Mallory and Andrew Irvine disappeared on their summit attempt, and it is still argued that they may have succeeded in completing Bruce's goal of having an expedition member reach the summit.

Bruce did not return to Everest. Between 1931 and 1936 he was Honorary Colonel of the 5th Royal Gurkha Rifles of the Indian Army. He died of a stroke in 1939.

In 1923 he was elected President of the Alpine Club, in 1925 he was awarded the Royal Geographical Society Founder's Medal, for his "lifelong geographical work in the exploration of the Himalaya, culminating in his leadership of the Mount Everest Expeditions of 1922 and 1924". He had been appointed a Member of the Royal Victorian Order in 1903, and was made a Companion of the Order of the Bath in 1918. He received the honorary degree of Doctor of Science from the Universities of Oxford and of Wales, the Doctor of Civil Law of the University of Edinburgh and the University of St Andrews.

== Expeditions ==
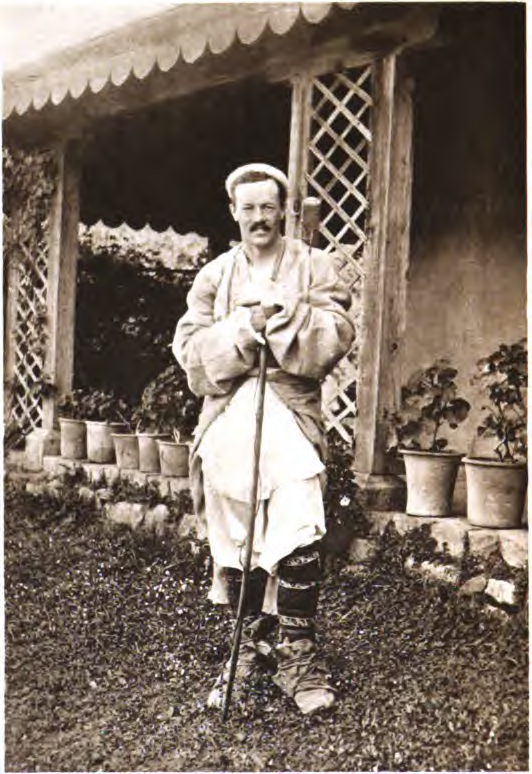
Charles Granville Bruce in 1910

- 1892: Karakoram, with William Martin Conway
- 1895: Nanga Parbat, with Albert F. Mummery
- 1907: Trisul, with Tom George Longstaff
- 1922: 1922 British Mount Everest expedition, with Edward Lisle Strutt
- 1924: 1924 British Mount Everest expedition

== Works by Bruce ==
- Twenty Years in the Himalaya. London: Edward Arnold, 1910
- Kulu and Lahoul. An account of my latest climbing journeys in the Himalaya. London: Edward Arnold, 1914
- The Assault on Mount Everest 1922. London: Longmans, Green & Co, 1922
- Himalayan Wanderer. London: Alexander Maclehose & Co, 1934
- Bruce, C.G. (16 October 1922). "Darjeeling to the Rongbuk Glacier Base Camp" . The Geographical Journal. 60 (6): 385–394. Bibcode:1922GeogJ..60..385B. doi:10.2307/1781075. JSTOR 1781075.

== See also ==
- Timeline of climbing Mount Everest
