= First ascent of Mount Everest =

There are two claimants to the title of First ascent of Mount Everest.

- The 1924 British Mount Everest expedition, consisting of George Mallory and Andrew Irvine, might have reached the summit, but Mallory and Irvine perished on descent.
- The 1953 British Mount Everest expedition, consisting of Tenzing Norgay and Edmund Hillary, was the first confirmed successful ascent.
