= Bentley Beetham =

British mountain climber, ornithologist and photographer

Beetham in 1924

Bentley Beetham (1 May 1886 – 5 April 1963) was an English mountaineer, ornithologist and photographer, and a member of the 1924 British Mount Everest expedition.

== Early life ==
Beetham was born in Darlington in 1886, the second son of James Weighell Beetham and Frances Elizabeth Beetham. His mother's maiden name was Bentley. Beetham's father, a bank manager in Darlington, died when Beetham was four years old.

Until the age of eight Beetham was educated at Mr Bowman's Preparatory School; he then attended Queen Elizabeth's Grammar School, Darlington, where his brother John was already a pupil. From 1899 to 1903 he attended the North Eastern County School (now called Barnard Castle School) at Barnard Castle, where he was a boarder. He left school at the age of sixteen.

== Career ==
For some years after leaving school Beetham worked in an architect's office in Darlington, then from 1903 to 1914 he was busy with field research, writing books and articles, photography and giving lectures. In 1914, having established himself as a leading ornithologist, he returned to the North Eastern County School as a schoolmaster, teaching natural history. A Fellow of the Zoological Society of London, in 1927 he was elected a member of the Royal Geographical Society. He retired in 1949, and moved to Cotherstone in County Durham. In 1962 he was disabled by a stroke and spent his last year in a nursing home, where he died on 5 April 1963. His ashes were scattered from the top of Shepherd's Crag, Borrowdale.

== Ornithology ==
From 1903 to 1914 Beetham devoted much time to his passion for ornithology. Amongst his expeditions, always undertaken with a camera in hand, were trips to the coast in the north-east of England, where he developed a technique for photographing gannets that involved abseiling down cliffs with the rope attached to a stake that was driven into the ground at the top of the cliff. Beetham at this time used a cumbersome and heavy Sanderson half-plate field camera.

== Rock climbing and mountaineering ==
Beetham started rock climbing in the English Lake District, although his re-ascents of the sea-cliffs on the north-east coast, once he had captured images of birds on photographic plates, involved much use of the hands. In the Lakes he used Wasdale Head as a base and commenced a friendship with Howard Somervell. Together they made ascents of the classic Lakeland climbs in the period before the First World War.

After the war, Beetham and Somervell started climbing in the Alps, initially under the supervision of the 60-year-old Godfrey Solly in Chamonix, and subsequently on their own and without guides. In 1924, Beetham, along with Somervell (who had already been on the 1922 British Mount Everest Expedition), was chosen by the Mount Everest Committee to be a member of the ill-fated 1924 British Mount Everest expedition, on which Mallory and Irvine were killed. During the expedition Beetham suffered from dysentery and sciatica and never made it higher on the mountain than Camp III at c. 21,000ft. In his 2012 book Into the Silence, Wade Davis argues that Beetham – whom he considered an ill-advised selection for the expedition – prevented the most qualified and promising English climber of the period, Richard Graham, from joining. Graham had been a conscientious objector during the First World War, which became the basis of a whispering campaign by Beetham, even though Beetham had not fought himself.

By contrast, Somervell wrote, in an obituary to Beetham, that "the whole expedition was severely handicapped by having our best climber forced into inactivity" and Captain John Noel wrote:

Beetham, who is one of the stoutest men of the Alpine Club – a man with a marvel of pace and endurance on the mountains. A climbing companion who Somervell himself could not outrival in the Alps nearly died of dysentery. But such was the strength of his constitution and determination that he was able to go on

It was during this expedition that Beetham took his highly regarded photographs of Tibet.

Beetham made numerous expeditions to other ranges in the world, including the Tatra Mountains of Czechoslovakia, Chile, the Drakensberg, the Lofoten islands and Spitsbergen. He is most associated with the High Atlas mountains of Morocco, which he visited on five occasions. His first visit was in 1927, together with G. Thompson, during which he made the first British ascents of many peaks in the Toubkal region.

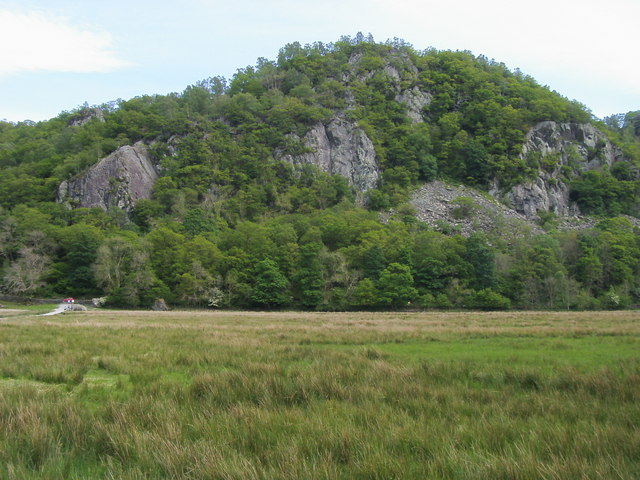
Shepherd's Crag, Borrowdale

Beetham's name is familiar to anyone who climbs in the Borrowdale valley in the Lake District. He made the first ascent, often solo, of numerous classic climbs in the valley, including "Little Chamonix" and "Corvus", and wrote the third edition of the Fell & Rock Climbing Club guidebook to the valley, published in 1953. The 1990 guide to the valley notes that Beetham, "with the Goldsborough Club of Barnard Castle School, surveyed every sizable crag in the valley, working out well over a hundred routes with a wide range of difficulty". Beetham was responsible for developing the most popular crag in the valley, Shepherd's Crag, which lies just above the main road that runs beside Derwentwater.

In an article in The Journal of the Fell & Rock Climbing Club (1946), Beetham explained the attraction of climbing in Borrowdale, comparing the experience with that found on the more traditional higher crags of the Lakes.

You go to Pillar or the Napes, to Scafell or Dow, and there are the climbs all spread out before you, like goods in a shop window; and having paid due regard to the price—the standard of difficulty of each—you make your choice and up you go. In Borrowdale there is no such scansorial display: there are plenty of climbs within the reach of all, as I hope this article will reveal, but they have to be found, identified and carefully followed. In this last there is, I think, a hidden virtue, useful as training for the Alps, where a slight deviation from the intended route may lead one to an impasse, to less interesting climbing, or to a wrong destination altogether, and so wreck the whole expedition.

== Bentley Beetham Trust ==
A collection of Beetham's photographs – those he took in Tibet on the 1924 expedition, considered "an important historical record of Tibetan culture", as well as photographs of Barnard Castle, Teesdale, the Alps, the Atlas and Tatra mountains – is held in Palace Green Library next to Durham Cathedral. The collection is supervised by the Bentley Beetham Trust in conjunction with the University of Durham.

== Bibliography ==
- Lowes, Michael D. (2014). Lure of the Mountains: The Life of Bentley Beetham, 1924 Everest Expedition Mountaineer. Vertebrate Publishing. ISBN 9781906148942.

=== Selected publications by Beetham ===
- The Home-Life of the Spoonbill, the Stork and Some Herons, Witherby & Co., 1910
- Photography for Bird-Lovers. A practical guide ... With photographic plates by Bentley Beetham, Witherby & Co., 1911
- 'On the positions assumed by birds in flight', in British Birds, 1911
- 'The Buff-backed Heron' in Wild Life, vol. 6 (1915)
- 'The Return Journey', chapter 8 of The Fight for Everest 1924, Longmans, Green & Co., 1925
- Among Our Banished Birds, Arnold, 1927; Longmans, Green & Co., New York
- Borrowdale, Fell & Rock Climbing Club, 1953
