= The Epic of Everest =

1924 film

- UK re-release poster
- Directed by: J. B. L. Noel
- Starring: Andrew Irvine, George Mallory
- Music by: Eugène Goossens, fils and Frederick Laurence (compilers)
- Release date: 1924
- Running time: 87 minutes

The Epic of Everest (1924)

The Epic of Everest is a 1924 documentary about the Mallory and Irvine Mount Everest expedition. The publicity surrounding the film provoked a diplomatic incident following its 1924 release, known as the "Affair of the Dancing Lamas", that delayed future expeditions and may have destabilized the Tibetan government.

"Captain John Noel was the official photographer on the 1924 British Expedition to Mount Everest, famed for the tragic loss of mountaineers, George Mallory and Andrew Irvine. Noel was an adventurous explorer who had tried but failed to get to Everest through Tibet in 1913. It was this centenary that the BFI was celebrating with the restoration of his film, which Noel financed himself and released as The Epic of Everest in 1924. He toured extensively around the world, lecturing with the film footage and beautiful colour slides.

The remains of Mallory and Irvine were eventually found in 1999 and 2024, respectively.

After a digital restoration in 2013, the film was re-released in UK cinemas.

== Music ==
The live musical accompaniment for London screenings was compiled by the conductor Eugène Goossens with help from composer and music librarian Frederick Laurence. It included excerpts from Mussorgsky's A Night on the Bare Mountain, Eugene Aynsley Goossens' Old Chinese Folk Song, and various Tibetan folk tunes. The Morning Post commented that "No film in London today has had more care taken in securing good and appropriate music".

== Restoration ==
In 2020, the restored print was selected by the BFI London Film Festival for inclusion in We Are One: A Global Film Festival, an online film festival organized during the COVID-19 pandemic. A newly commissioned score for the restoration was composed, orchestrated and conducted by Simon Fisher Turner.

== See also ==
- List of media related to Mount Everest
