= John Hazard =

John Hazard may refer to:

- John N. Hazard, American scholar of Soviet law and public administration
- John de Vars Hazard, British Army officer and mountaineer

== See also ==
- John Hazard Reynolds, American attorney and politician from New York
