= John de Vars Hazard =

British army officer and mountaineer

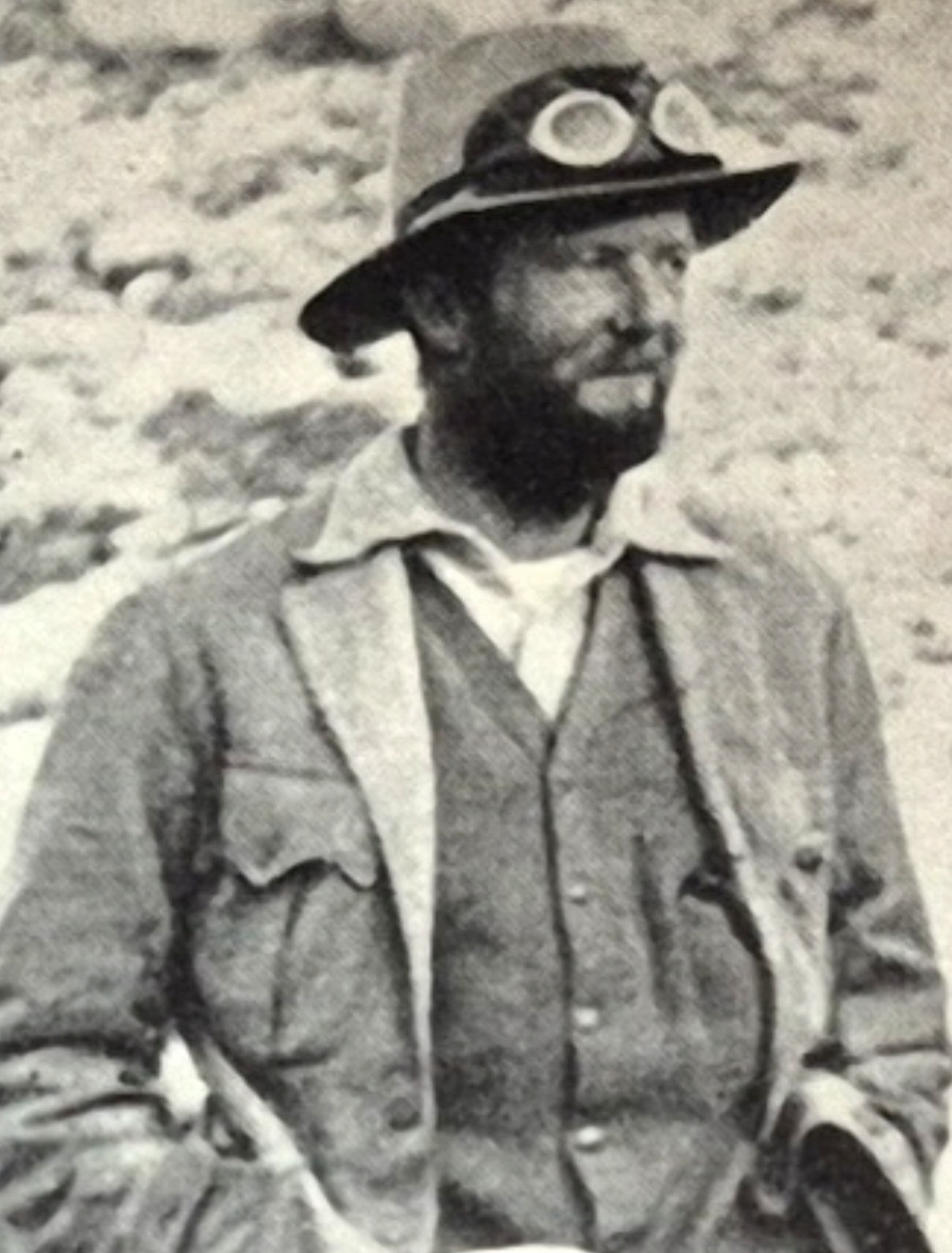
- Born: 18 August 1888
- Died: 12 June 1968 (aged 79); London
- Occupations: Mountaineer, British Army Officer

John de Vars Hazard MC (18 August 1888 – 12 June 1968) was a British Army officer and mountaineer who took part in the 1924 British Mount Everest expedition, most famous for the disappearance of the mountaineers George Mallory and Andrew "Sandy" Irvine.

== Biography ==
Born on 18 August 1888, John de Vars Hazard spent much of his childhood in France and was educated at Bedford School before going on to study engineering. In his youth he took part in pioneering climbs in the Lake District, and made the first ascent of Great Gable's Abbey Buttress at Easter 1909. He joined the Royal Artillery and served in the First World War, during which he fought at the Battle of the Somme in 1916, as second in command to Henry Morshead, and was awarded the Military Cross. Morshead took part in the 1921 British Mount Everest reconnaissance expedition and the 1922 British Mount Everest expedition, and recommended that Hazard should be a member of the 1924 British Mount Everest expedition.

According to Hazard's obituary in the Alpine Journal, he is best remembered for leaving four Sherpas behind on the North Col during the 1924 British Mount Everest expedition, whilst he was bringing the men down, resulting in a very risky rescue operation by Howard Somervell, Edward Felix Norton and George Mallory. Later, after most of the expedition had left to return to India, Hazard transgressed a Tibetan rule and went to survey the Yarlung Tsangpo River. As a result, the Alpine Journal obituary claims, the Tibetan authorities banned foreign expeditions in Tibet for nine years, between 1924 and 1933. However, this account of events has been disputed and Hazard has been described as a "scapegoat" for the diplomatic debacle later known as the Affair of the Dancing Lamas.

John de Vars Hazard died in London on 12 June 1968.
