= John Baptist Lucius Noel =

British mountaineer and filmmaker (1890–1989)

John Noel on Everest

John Baptist Lucius Noel FRGS (26 February 1890 – 12 March 1989) was a British mountaineer and filmmaker best known for his film of the 1924 British Mount Everest expedition.

== Life ==
Noel's father, Colonel Edward Noel (1852–1917), was the younger son of Charles Noel, 2nd Earl of Gainsborough. Born in Newton Abbot, Devon, England, Noel was educated in Switzerland, where he fell in love with the mountains, and at the Royal Military Academy Sandhurst. He was baptised Baptist Lucius and added the name John by deed poll in 1908.

Noel was commissioned into the East Yorkshire Regiment in 1909 and posted to India. His battalion spent summers near the Himalayas and in 1913 he travelled in disguise into Tibet in order to approach Mount Everest. He reached to within forty miles of Everest, closer than any other foreigner before him.

When the First World War started in 1914, Noel was on leave in Britain and he was attached to the King's Own Yorkshire Light Infantry, as his own battalion remained in India. On 26 August 1914 at Le Cateau during the retreat from Mons, he was taken prisoner but managed to escape from the Germans. In 1916 he was seconded as an instructor in the Machine Gun Corps and, from 1920, he served as revolver instructor at the Small Arms School at Hythe, Kent. He wrote several pamphlets on revolvers and automatic pistols. He retired from the British Army in February 1922.

In 1919 Noel was invited to address a joint meeting of the Royal Geographical Society and the Alpine Club about his travels near Everest. Sir Francis Younghusband used the occasion to call for the ascent of Mount Everest in 1921.

External videos
- https://player.bfi.org.uk/free/film/watch-climbing-mt-everest-1922-online Climbing Mount Everest

He joined the 1922 Everest expedition as its official photographer and filmmaker and produced a short film, Climbing Mount Everest (1922). Shown in cinemas around Britain it had reasonable success.

Noel filming from the North Col in 1922

In 1924, Noel formed a private company which offered to fund £8,000 of the estimated £9,000 total cost of that year's Everest expedition if Noel was allowed to make a second film and retain all the rights to it and other photography. Noel planned filming in such a way that he could produce a mountaineering epic if the summit attempt succeeded or a Tibet travelogue if it failed. Noel reached the North Col and used a specially adapted camera to film the ascent of the peak. A note from George Mallory to Noel was the last contact with the lost explorer before his body was discovered in 1999. On 8 June 1924 George Mallory and Andrew Irvine set off for the summit and their disappearance added drama to the film, The Epic of Everest (1924).

Mallory's body and personal effects would be discovered in 1999, and Irvine's partial remains in 2024 on Everest.

To promote the 1924 film, Noel brought to London a group of Tibetan monks who performed before screenings; the performances of the "dancing lamas" offended Tibetan religious sensibilities and caused a breakdown in diplomatic relations between Britain and Tibet which became known as the "Affair of the Dancing Lamas" and which lasted nearly ten years. Noel lectured widely in North America and published a book about his adventures, Through Tibet to Everest (1927).

After the first ascent of Everest in 1953, Noel lectured once again about the mountain and his footage and photographs appeared widely in many films and television programmes.

In his later years, Noel restored old houses. He had one daughter, Sandra. He died on 12 March 1989 (aged 99).

== Books by J.B.L. Noel ==
- How to Shoot with a Revolver, London: Forster Groom, 1918. [Riling 1865]
- The Automatic Pistol, London: Forster Groom, 1919. [Riling 1881]
- Through Tibet To Everest, London: Edward Arnold, 1927.

== Sources ==
- Davis, Wade (2012). Into the Silence: The Great War, Mallory and the Conquest of Everest. Vintage. ISBN 978-0-09-956383-9.
- Peter H. Hansen, 'Noel, John Baptist Lucius (1890–1989)’, Oxford Dictionary of National Biography, Oxford University Press, 2004
- Noel, Sandra, Everest pioneer: the photographs of Captain John Noel (2003)
- Peter H. Hansen, "The Dancing Lamas of Everest: Cinema, Orientalism, and Anglo-Tibetan Relations in the 1920s," American Historical Review 101:3 (June 1996), pp. 712–747.
- Unsworth, Walt (2000) [1981]. Everest: The Mountaineering History. Mountaineers. ISBN 978-0-89886-670-4.
