= Graham Hoyland =

British author and mountaineer

Graham Francis Hoyland (born 12 May 1957) is a British author, mountaineer and sailor. He reached the summit of Mount Everest on 7 October 1993 and was the 15th Briton to climb Everest. He instigated the Mallory and Irvine Research Expedition which found George Mallory's body in 1999.

In 2006 Hoyland climbed to 21,000 feet (6,400 m) on Everest in a reproduction of Mallory's clothing for a field test. Mallory's clothes from the 1924 British Mount Everest expedition were recreated by using fragments recovered from his body. The clothing was of natural materials: silk shirts, hand-knitted cardigans, and a jacket and plus-fours made of gabardine, a tightly woven cotton fabric. The project showed that the clothing was effective at providing protection at high altitude. Hoyland stated in Alpine Journal that it functioned very well and was quite comfortable. The Performance Clothing Research Centre at the University of Leeds tested the reproduced outfit and "concluded that Mallory was sufficiently well insulated to operate effectively on Everest, provided he was moving and not forced to bivouac".

Hoyland was a BBC producer for over 30 years and worked on programmes such as Dragon's Den and Around the World in 80 Faiths.

In 2019 The Independent newspaper named him as one of the "5 Most Inspiring Explorers".

== Personal life ==
In 1999 Hoyland married Sarah Champion; the couple divorced in 2007. In September 2016 it was reported that Champion (who, at the time was Labour's shadow minister for Domestic Abuse) had been arrested for assaulting him in 2007.

Howard Somervell, a member of the 1922 and 1924 Everest expeditions, was a great uncle.

== Books ==
- Last Hours on Everest: The Gripping Story of Mallory & Irvine's Fatal Ascent. Glasgow, UK: William Collins, an imprint of HarperCollins. ISBN 978-0-00-745574-4. (2013). Given an honourable mention by the Boardman Tasker prize.
- Walking Through Spring (William Collins, 2016)
- Yeti: An Abominable History (William Collins, 2018). Awarded Book of the Week in The Times
- Merlin: The Power Behind the Spitfire, Mosquito and Lancaster: The Story of the Engine That Won the Battle of Britain and WWII (William Collins, 2020)
- Jet: The Engine That Changed The World (Key, 2022)
