= Mallory and Irvine Research Expedition =

1999 Mount Everest expedition

The goal of the Mallory and Irvine Research Expedition of 1999 was to discover evidence of whether George Mallory and Andrew Irvine had been the first to summit Mount Everest in their attempt of 8–9 June 1924. Key objectives included finding Irvine's body and retrieving a camera that might hold proof of their summit success. Jochen Hemmleb, after reviewing historical records, pinpointed a search area based on a 1975 Chinese expedition report. The expedition was instigated by British climber Graham Hoyland. It was organised by regular Everest expedition leader Eric Simonson and advised by researcher Jochen Hemmleb, with a team of climbers from the United States, United Kingdom and Germany.

Funded by WGBH/Boston's Nova series and the BBC, the expedition included mountaineers Eric Simonson, Conrad Anker, Dave Hahn, and others. On 1 May 1999, Anker discovered Mallory's body at 26,760 ft (8,156 m), well-preserved by the harsh conditions. The body showed significant injuries consistent with a fall. Various artefacts were recovered, but the camera remained missing.

The discovery of Mallory's body raised intriguing questions, especially given the absence of a photo of his wife, which he had intended to leave at the summit, suggesting he might have reached it. Subsequent searches in 2001, 2004, and 2007 aimed to locate Irvine and further evidence but yielded limited results until a successful 2024 search.

== Preparations ==
The expedition's objective was to search for evidence of the 1924 British Mount Everest expedition and obtain information about the high point attained by Mallory and Irvine, which may have either supported or refuted whether or not they reached the summit. The team hoped in particular to find a camera on Irvine's body which, had the pair been successful, should have contained a picture of the summit.

After he had re-examined the historical record of Mount Everest North Face expeditions, Jochen Hemmleb recognised that the only seemingly factual information about Mallory and Irvine—other than artefacts such as the ice axe found by Percy Wyn-Harris on the expedition led by Hugh Ruttledge in 1933—was during a 1975 Chinese expedition. Wang Hongbao had discovered a body he had insisted was "English, English!" during what he asserted was a brief twenty-minute walk from Camp VI. The initial challenge was to identify the location of the 1975 Chinese Camp VI and use it as the centre point of a circular search zone with a twenty-minute walk or more, if necessary, radius. From a photo of the 1975 Camp VI, published in Another Ascent of the World's Highest Peak—Qomolangma, Hemmleb determined that the Camp was on an ill-defined rib of rock that bisects the snow terrace on the North Face. Hemmleb believed this was the area in which Irvine's body lay, some distance below his ice axe.

The expedition was funded jointly by WGBH/Boston's Nova series and the BBC. The website MountainZone provided daily expedition dispatches. Other sponsors were Mountain Hardwear, Outdoor Research, Lowe Alpine, Eureka!, Starbucks, PowerBar, Vasque Footwear, Slumberjack, and Glazer's Camera. The personnel were Eric Simonson, mountaineer and expedition leader; mountaineer and high-altitude cameraman Dave Hahn; mountaineer and assistant film producer Graham Hoyland; mountaineers Conrad Anker, Jake Norton, Tap Richards, and Andy Politz; mountaineering historian, researcher, and support climber Jochen Hemmleb; mountaineering historian, researcher, and expedition organiser Larry Johnson; expedition doctor Lee Meyers; high-altitude cameraman Thom Pollard; film producers Liesl Clark and Peter Firstbrook; film sound technician Jyoti Lal Rana; photographer Ned Johnston; and a team of twelve Sherpas led by Sirdar Dawa Nuru.

== Discovery ==
On 1 May 1999, at approximately 10:00 a.m., Anker, Hahn, Norton, Politz, and Richards reached 26,900 ft (8,199 m), where they were to establish Camp VI. From there, the five mountaineers set out at 10:30 a.m. for the "ill-defined rib" identified in Hemmleb's search guidelines and traversed west over the North Face's precipitously angled terrain. Anker searched on intuition and descended to the lower margin of the snow terrace, where it drops away approximately 6,562 ft (2,000 m) to the head of the central Rongbuk Glacier, and soon after zig-zagging back up the slope in the direction of Camp VI, he looked to the west and saw a "patch of white," which he proceeded towards; he soon ascertained that it was an old body. It was 11:45 a.m., and 26,760 ft (8,156 m) was the elevation where the corpse lay. The body was partially frozen into the scree and well preserved due to the cold, dry air and constant freezing temperatures; it was lying prone, fully extended, with both arms somewhat outstretched and the head pointed uphill. The right leg had broken, and the left leg was crossed over it, possibly for protection, suggesting the mountaineer was still consciously aware after coming to rest. The rear of the body was predominantly exposed, as the clothing had been partially destroyed by the elements and blown away by the wind. The exposed skin was bleached white, and although the corpse was frozen, purportedly, some elasticity remained in the frozen tissue; the hands and forearms appeared dark. Despite the body being notably intact, Everest's alpine choughs had damaged the right leg, the buttocks, and the abdominal cavity by pecking at them and consuming most of the internal organs. Tied to the corpse's waist were the remnants of a braided cotton climbing rope, some tangled around the body, from which its broken, frayed end trailed. On the right foot was an intact green leather hobnailed boot; only the tongue of the left boot remained, jammed between the left foot's bare toes and the heel of the right boot.

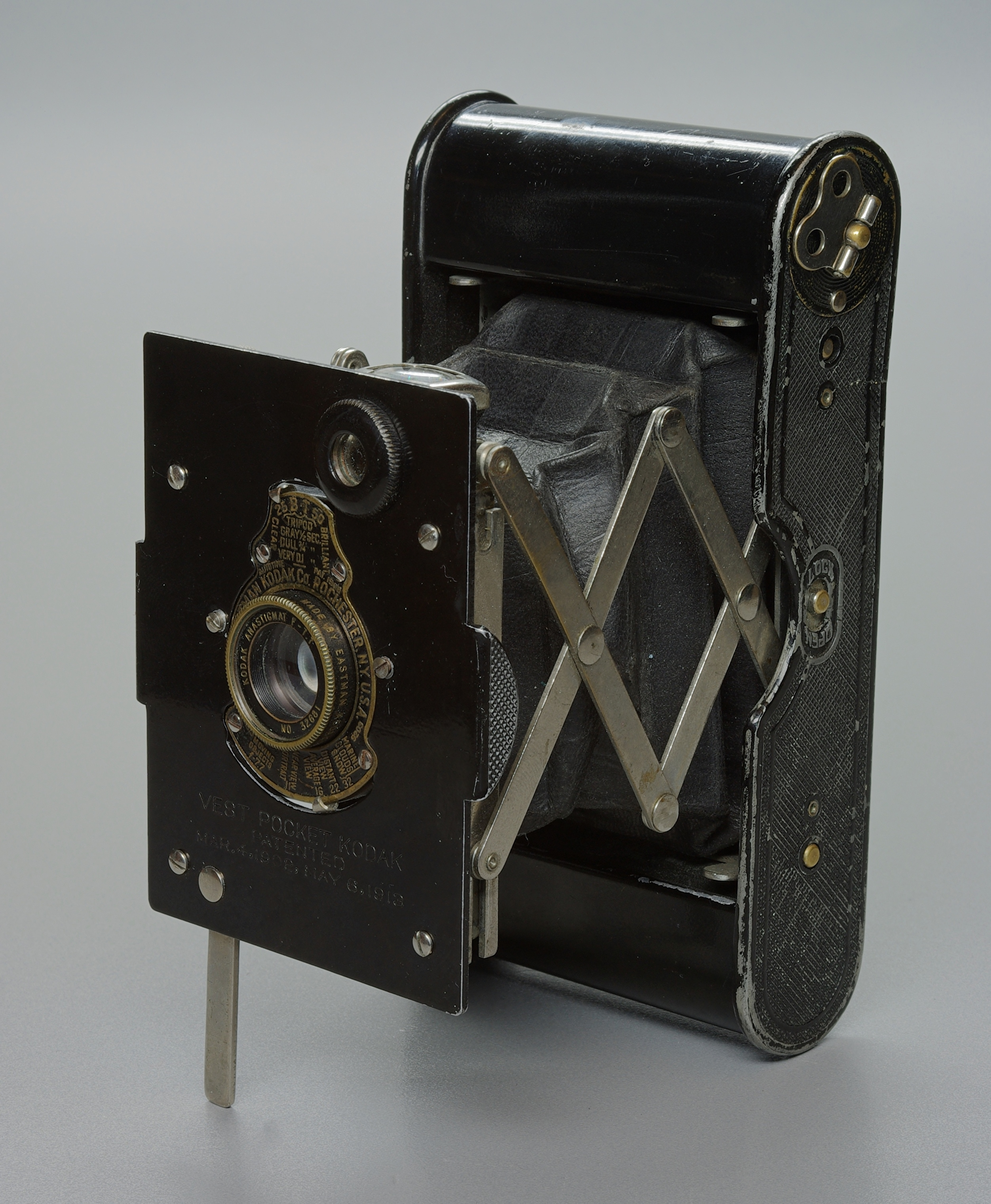
Vest Pocket Kodak

The prevalent assumption was that Irvine had fallen in 1924 from where, in 1933, Percy Wyn-Harris had discovered the ice axe, presumably Irvine's; therefore, Anker, Hahn, Norton, and Richards expected the body to be his, but Politz said, "This is not him." (Note: The reason for Politz's scepticism regarding the body being Irvine's was its position; deep within his subconscious mind, his intuition had remembered that Wang Hongbao had discovered a corpse in a position with its mouth agape and had one cheek pecked at by goraks, this body was lying prone.) When they found the remains, before they touched them and determined who it was, they documented photographically and cinematographically the body and discovery site. Richards, an archaeologist by training, and Norton carefully separated the remaining layers of tattered garments that still covered part of the body, protecting them somewhat from the elements: multiple layers of cotton, silk underwear, a flannel shirt, woollen pullover and trousers, and an outer garment that resembled canvas. Close to the nape of the neck, Norton turned over part of the shirt collar and found affixed to it a clothing label with red print, reading, "W.F. Paine, 72 High Street, Godalming," and below it a second label, again with red print, reading, "G. Mallory." They discovered another label with "G. Leigh. Ma," written in black, and a third label. The expedition members realised that they had found Mallory, rather than Irvine as expected. Because the corpse had frozen into the surrounding scree, the mountaineers used their ice axes and pocketknives to excavate the site to find crucial artefacts and, most importantly, Somervell's Vest Pocket Kodak camera that he "allegedly" had lent to Mallory for his summit attempt with Irvine. Presumably, if they had discovered the camera, it might have solved the mystery of whether or not the summit of Mount Everest was reached for the first time in 1924, years before the first confirmed successful summit of Mount Everest by Edmund Hillary and Tenzing Norgay on 29 May 1953. Experts from Kodak have said that it might be possible to develop images from the camera's film using sophisticated techniques and have drawn up specific professional guidelines for an expedition that might discover the camera.

The injuries on Mallory's body were severe; above the hobnail boot on his right foot, both the tibia and fibula of his right leg—which lay at a grotesque angle—were broken. His right scapula was somewhat deformed, and his right elbow was fractured or dislocated. Along his right side were multiple still-noticeable cuts, bruises, and abrasions; on his torso, his ribs had fractured, and black and blue bruises were visible on the skin of his chest. The broken climbing rope, which had been looped around his waist and secured with a bowline knot, had severely crushed his ribs and burned his skin; the indentation marks caused by the rope tugging on his skin were still observable around his torso; undoubtedly, he had fallen. The rope-jerk injuries around Mallory's torso indicate that he and Irvine were roped to each other when the accident occurred; the exact circumstances surrounding their deaths are unknown.

After chipping at the ice and rock for one hour with their axes, the expedition members had freed one jacket pocket in which they discovered an altimeter manufactured by Cary, London, that could record altitude to a maximum of 30,000 ft (9,144 m); its crystal was broken and the hands were absent. Norton reached underneath Mallory's body and found a pouch that hung from his neck. After cutting the pouch's underside with his knife, he discovered a tin of Brand & Co's Savoury Meat Lozenges. Also found were a pair of nail scissors in a leather case and a letter inside an envelope, flawlessly preserved. Other artefacts were discovered in a pouch on Mallory's right side and from separate pockets: a handkerchief—wrapped around some letters (Note: In an interview with the Sunday Mirror in 1999, Mallory's daughter, Frances Clare, expressed that her father climbed Mount Everest with a photograph of her mother, Ruth, and one of her letters in his jacket pocket and that Mallory told his wife, "before he set out," that if he ever attained the summit, he intended to leave a photograph of her there. Ruth had told Clare as a teenager about the story of the letter and photograph. Because of erroneous information that she received, she incorrectly stated in the interview that, discovered on 1 May 1999, was a letter from her mother on Mallory's body. There was no discovery of either a letter from Ruth or a picture of her found on Mallory's remains.) addressed to Mallory—with a burgundy, blue, and green foulard pattern, decorated with the monogram G.L.M.; a second-handkerchief with a red, yellow, and blue pattern, also monogrammed with the initials G.L.M.; a tube of petroleum jelly wrapped in a white handkerchief; one fingerless glove; a W.E. Oates of Sheffield manufactured Lambfoot antler-handle pocket knife with a leather case; an intact box of still usable Swan Vestas matches; and a variety of boot laces and straps. Other artefacts found were: a pencil and safety pin; adjustable straps attached to a metal spring clip—used to connect an oxygen mask to Mallory's fur-lined leather helmet; a note from expedition member Geoffrey Bruce; gear checklists, written in pencil on scraps of paper; a bill addressed to G.H. Leigh Mallory, Esq., Herschel House, Cambridge, from A.W. Gamage Ltd, Holborn, London, E.C.1.; and discovered deep inside a pocket was a pair of unbroken snow goggles. (Note: The snow goggles discovered in Mallory's pocket on 1 May 1999 suggest he and Irvine may have been descending in fading light or after nightfall. However, an alternative theory suggests that during what Noel Odell described as a "rather severe blizzard," which lasted from approximately 2:00 p.m. until 4:00 p.m., the vents on Mallory's goggles may have become clogged with snow, resulting in the lenses fogging up, forcing him to remove them.) The artefacts and samples of each layer of garments were placed one by one in resealable plastic Ziploc bags for examination. To the dismay of Anker, Hahn, Norton, Richards, and Politz, the most sought-after artefact, the Vest Pocket Kodak camera that Mallory had "allegedly" borrowed from Somervell, was not found after a thorough search. With the prior permission of Mallory's son, John Mallory, Anker cut a small skin sample from Mallory's right forearm for DNA analysis. The five expedition mountaineers buried Mallory by covering his remains with rocks, and Politz read a Church of England committal ceremony provided by Barry Rogerson, the Bishop of Bristol.

Controversy arose among family members and climbers as to what was seen as an attempt to capitalise on the discovery of the corpse, particularly as photographs of the body were reported to have been sold to Newsweek magazine for more than $40,000.

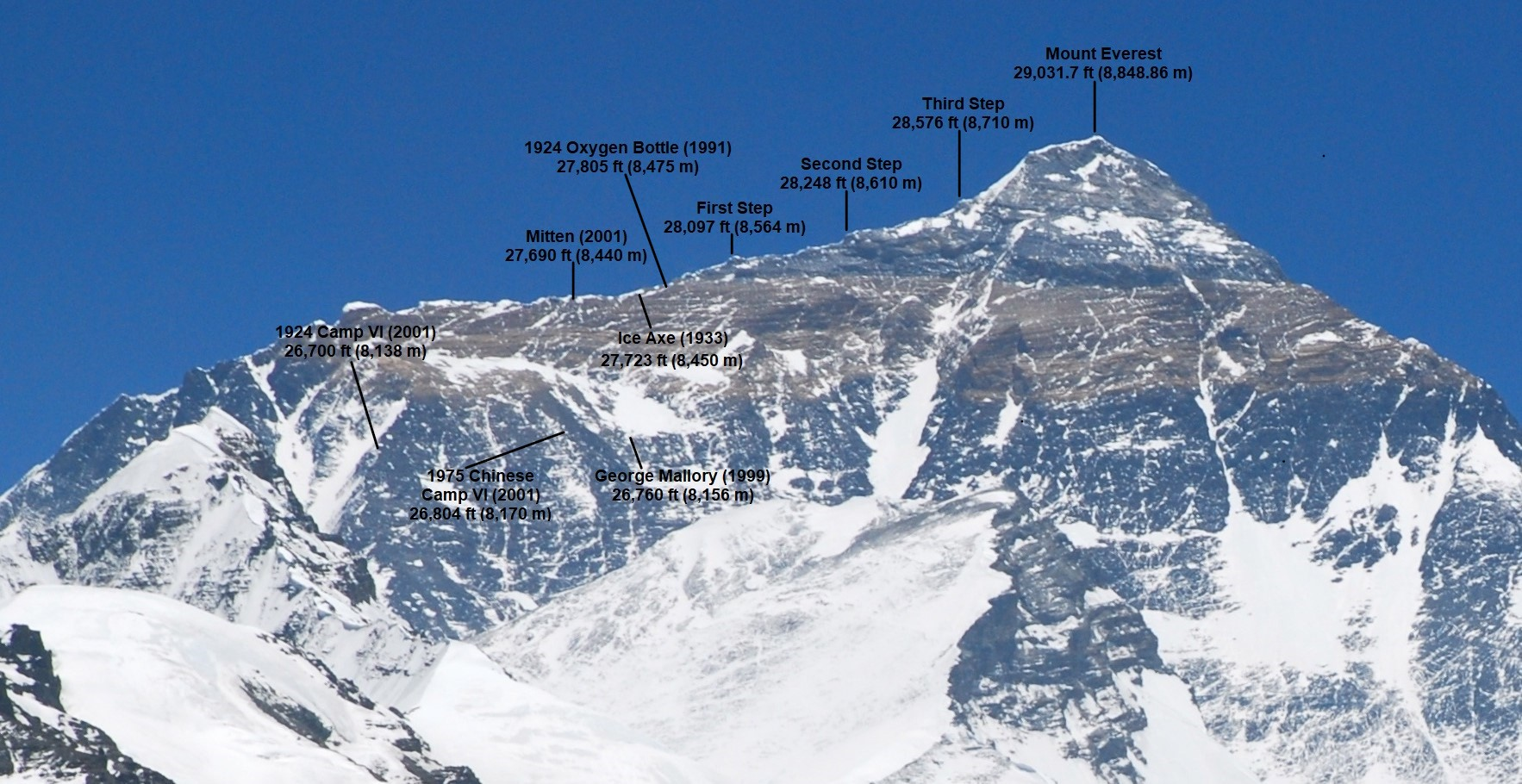
North Face of Everest, altitudes of discoveries, the Three Steps, and its summit

On 16 May, expedition members Andy Politz and Thom Pollard returned to Mallory's burial site for one last search for the camera that he had reportedly carried, this time using a metal detector. After removing the rocks that covered his remains, Politz used the metal detector. Pollard discovered a Borgel wristwatch in Mallory's trouser pocket—an artefact the team had missed during their initial search on 1 May. At the time of its discovery, the watch's crystal and minute hand were missing, and neither were discovered in Mallory's pocket or elsewhere; the second hand and hour hand were still in place on the watch when found; subsequently, the hour hand became dislodged from the watch. Politz also recovered a piece of Mallory's climbing rope—brittle from seventy-five years of exposure to the elements—and removed the hobnail boot from Mallory's right foot to add to the assemblage of artefacts. Again, the search for a camera proved unsuccessful after they thoroughly searched the site using the metal detector. Pollard resolved that he wanted to see Mallory's face frozen into the scree and remove the ice and dirt surrounding his head. After excavating, he had uncovered and freed Mallory's head adequately so that he could lie on the ground and look straight at his face, which was, to a small extent, distorted; his eyes were closed; there was stubble on his chin; and on his forehead above his left eye was a puncture wound from which two pieces of skull protruded; and there was dried blood. Politz and Pollard reburied Mallory's remains by covering him with rocks and then repeated the committal ceremony. Expedition leader Eric Simonson discovered an old oxygen bottle below the First Step on 15 May 1991, the same day he reached the summit of Everest for the first time and subsequently realised that it may have belonged to one of the pioneering British Mount Everest expeditions. On 17 May 1999, at 2:00 a.m., Anker, Hahn, Norton, Richards, and two Sherpas, Dawa and Ang Pasang, left Camp VI at 26,903 ft (8,200 m) and began their summit bid. At about 10:30 a.m., Norton, Richards, and the two Sherpas abandoned the bid, retreating at an altitude of circa c. 28,084 ft (8,560 m) between the First and Second Steps; Anker and Hahn would later reach the summit at 2:50 p.m. Shortly after Norton and Richards had decided to retreat, they radioed Eric Simonson at Advanced Base Camp and informed him about their decision, and Simonson asked them to search for the oxygen cylinder he had found in 1991. After approximately half an hour of searching, Richards radioed A.B.C. and stated that he had discovered an oxygen cylinder at a location subsequently established as c. 558 ft (170 m) to 591 ft (180 m) horizontally east from the top of the First Step and at an altitude of c. 27,789 ft (8,470 m) to 27,805 ft (8,475 m). The oxygen cylinder's shape, size, valve assembly, and stamp, no 9, E.O.C. (Everest Oxygen Cylinder), conclusively confirmed that the bottle had belonged to the 1924 British Mount Everest expedition and had been used by Mallory and Irvine, as they were the only party who had used oxygen for a summit attempt. The no 9, stamped on the bottle, corresponded to the no 9 written by Mallory—as part of a list of oxygen cylinders he and Irvine took on their summit bid—on the envelope, addressed to him from "Stella," which also contained a letter from her, discovered on Mallory's body. (Note: Found on Mallory's body on 1 May 1999 were three letters: one from his brother Trafford, another from his sister Mary Henrietta, and a third from Stella Cobden-Sanderson (1886–1979)—daughter of Thomas Cobden-Sanderson and Anne Cobden-Sanderson—with whom he met and developed a friendship after she had attended one of his lectures during his lecture tour of the United States and Canada in early 1923.) On the envelope Mallory had noted the amounts of oxygen in each of their cylinders, figures which suggest a possibility the pair may have taken three cylinders on their final climb, rather than two as generally believed.

The discovery of the body revealed two pieces of circumstantial evidence that suggest that Mallory might have reached the summit: firstly, Mallory's daughter always said that Mallory carried a photo of his wife Ruth, with the intention of leaving it on the summit, and no such photo was found on the body. Given the excellent state of preservation of the body and the artefacts recovered from it, the absence of the photograph suggest that he may have reached the summit and deposited it there. Secondly, Mallory's snow goggles were in his pocket, indicating that he died at night; that he and Irvine had made a push for the summit and were descending very late in the day (though he may have had a second pair of goggles, ripped off in his fall). Given their known departure time and movements, had they not made the summit, it is unlikely that they would have still been out by nightfall. The body was only an hour or two from the safety of camp.

== Reaction ==
Hillary enthusiastically welcomed the news of the discovery of Mallory's body and described it as "very appropriate" that Mallory might have summited decades earlier. "He was really the initial pioneer of the whole idea of climbing Mount Everest," Hillary said. Mallory's son John, in regard to the possibility of Mallory reaching the summit, said, "To me the only way you achieve a summit is to come back alive; the job's half done if you don't get down again."

== Subsequent expeditions ==
During a second expedition in 2001, most of the 1999 team returned to search further. Many discoveries were made, including nearly every pre-World War II camp on the mountain. Jake Norton and Brent Okita re-discovered the 1924 Camp VI, last occupied by Mallory and Irvine. Eventually, the team abandoned their search for Irvine to rescue several other climbing parties stranded on the mountain and in deep distress. The victims included two Chinese glaciologists, three Russian climbers, an American guide, and his Guatemalan client. Several of the climbers were suffering from high altitude cerebral oedema, a condition where the victim can hallucinate, lose balance, and eventually become unable to walk, due to lack of oxygen (which, high up on Everest, is only one-third the partial pressure of oxygen at sea level) in the brain. This condition has led to many deaths and injuries in mountaineering.

In early 2004, Jake Norton and Dave Hahn returned to Everest with a film team and support from Sherpas Danuru and Tashi to look once more for evidence of Irvine and answers to what happened to Mallory and Irvine in 1924. While the team was able to scour the Yellow Band, the combination of a small team and uncooperative weather eliminated most chances of a major discovery.

During that same season, search parties were on the mountain from the website EverestNews, as well as an expedition led by Russell Brice, which included Graham Hoyland (Howard Somervell's grand-nephew and member of the 1999 expedition).

In 2007, the Altitude Everest Expedition led by Conrad Anker, who had found Mallory's body, tried to retrace Mallory's last steps. Jochen Hemmleb led another search expedition in 2010, examining new terrain on the Northeast Ridge, specifically near a feature called "The Warts." Nothing of consequence was discovered.

In 2024, a National Geographic team led by Jimmy Chin found Irvine's partial remains on Everest. It is believed that the remains had emerged from a melting glacier. The remains were found at the Central Rongbuk Glacier which is at an altitude at least 7,000 feet (2,100 m) lower than where Mallory’s body was discovered. A sock, with "A. C. Irvine" on a name tape, was found along with a boot and a foot, emerging from the ice. The cameras remain missing.

== See also ==
- List of Mount Everest expeditions
