= Edward F. Norton =

British army officer and mountaineer (1884–1954)

Lieutenant-General Edward F. Norton DSO MC
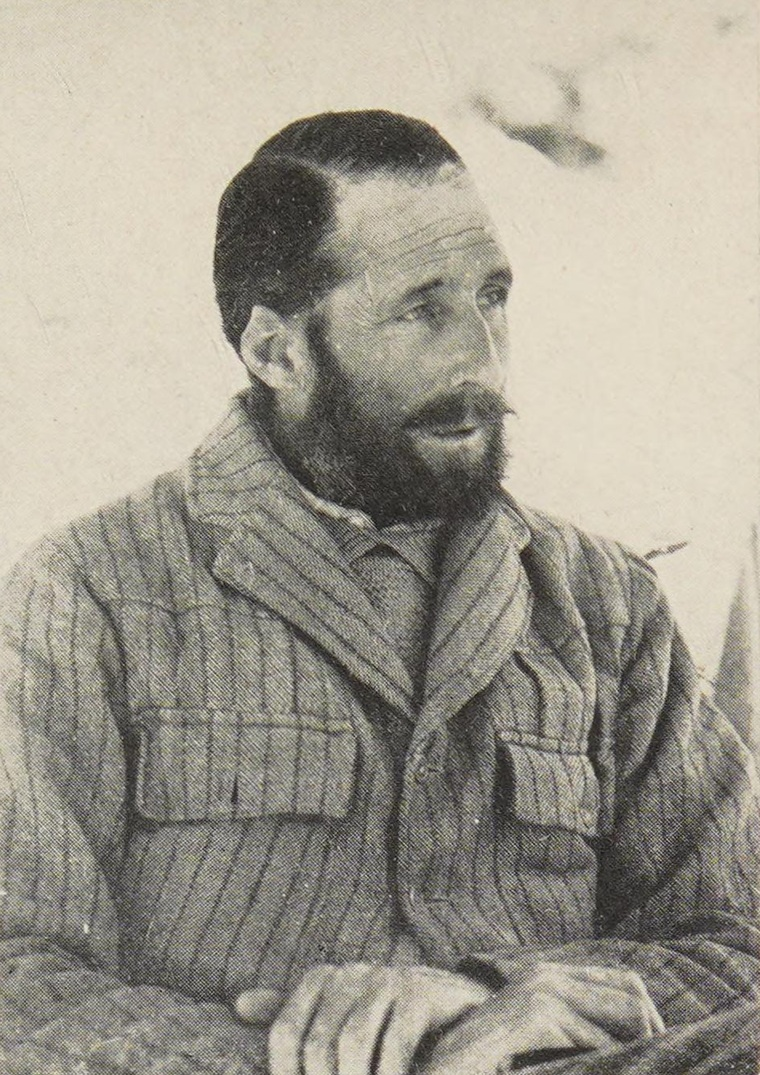
- Norton in 1924
- Born: 21 February 1884; San Isidro, Argentina
- Died: 3 November 1954 (aged 70); Winchester, Hampshire, England
- Military career
- Allegiance: United Kingdom
- Branch: British Army
- Service years: 1903–1942
- Rank: Lieutenant-General
- Service number: 6306
- Unit: Royal Artillery
- Commands: Western Independent District (1941–42); Madras District (1938–40)
- Conflicts: First World War; Second World War
- Awards: Distinguished Service Order; Military Cross
- Other work: 1922 British Mount Everest expedition 1924 British Mount Everest expedition 1952 Swiss Mount Everest expedition

Lieutenant-General Edward Felix Norton, DSO, MC (21 February 1884 – 3 November 1954) was a British Army officer and mountaineer.

== Early life ==
Norton attended Charterhouse School and the Royal Military Academy, Woolwich, and was commissioned into the Royal Regiment of Artillery as a second lieutenant on 24 December 1902. He joined artillery units in India and served in the First World War. He had been introduced to mountain climbing at the home in the Alps of his grandfather, Alfred Wills, a well-known mountaineer and president of the Alpine Club (1863–1865).

== Mountaineering ==
Norton's experience led to his taking part in the British 1922 Everest and 1924 Everest expeditions, reaching high elevations both years. His height of 8,572.8 m (28,126 ft)—reached in 1924 without using oxygen on the Great Couloir route—was a world altitude record which stood for nearly 30 years, only being surpassed during the unsuccessful Swiss expedition of 1952.

In 1924, he took over leadership of the expedition when General Charles Granville Bruce fell ill, and Norton was praised for handling affairs in the aftermath of the disappearance of George Mallory and Andrew Irvine.

== Military career ==
Norton served at Staff Colleges in India and England, and commanded the Royal Artillery and later the Madras District in the 1930s. He relinquished his appointment of BGS Aldershot Command, and his temporary brigadier's rank, in April 1938.

From 1940 to 1941, he was acting governor and then Commander-in-Chief of Hong Kong.

He retired in 1942, after a near fatal riding accident.

== Later years ==
From 1952 until 1953, he advised John Hunt that previous Everest assault camps had been too low, and in 1953 it should be on or very close under the Southern Summit.

== Bibliography ==
- Hunt, John (2013) [1953]. The Ascent of Everest. Hodder & Stoughton. ISBN 9781444760903.
