= 1924 British Mount Everest expedition =

Attempt at first ascent of Mount Everest in 1924

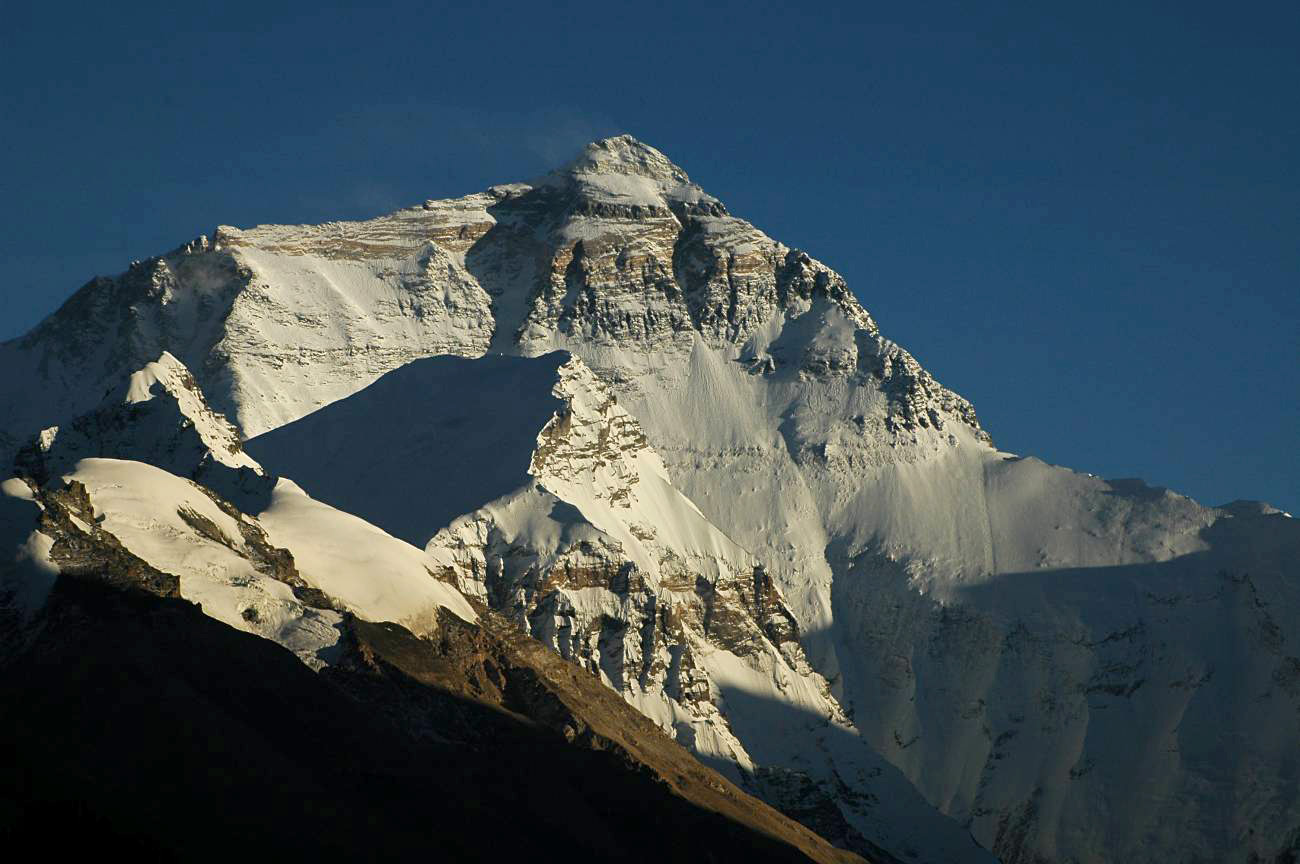
North Face of Mount Everest

The 1924 British Mount Everest expedition was—after the 1922 British Mount Everest expedition—the 2nd expedition with the goal of achieving the first ascent of Mount Everest. After two summit attempts in which Edward Norton set a world altitude record of 8,572.8 metres (28,126 ft), the mountaineers George Mallory and Andrew "Sandy" Irvine disappeared on the third attempt. Their disappearance has given rise to the long-standing speculation of whether or not the pair might have reached the summit. Mallory's body was found in 1999 at 8,156 metres (26,760 ft), but the resulting clues did not provide any conclusive evidence as to whether the summit was reached. Irvine's partial remains were later found in 2024 by a National Geographic team during a descent of the Rongbuk Glacier by the North Face.

== Background and motivation ==
At the beginning of the 20th century, the British participated in contests to be the first to reach the North and South Poles, without success. A desire to restore national prestige led to scrutiny and discussion of the possibility of "conquering the third pole" – making the first ascent of the highest mountain on Earth.

The southern side of the mountain, which is accessible from Nepal and today is the standard climbing route, was unavailable as Nepal was a "forbidden country" for westerners. Going to the north side was politically complex: it required the persistent intervention of the British-Indian government with the Dalai Lama regime in Tibet to allow British expedition activities.

A major handicap of all expeditions to the north side of Mount Everest is the tight time window between the end of winter and the start of the monsoon rains. To travel from Darjeeling in northern India over Sikkim to Tibet, it was necessary to climb high, long snow-laden passes east of the Kangchenjunga area. After this first step, a long journey followed through the valley of the Arun River to the Rongbuk valley near the North Face of Mount Everest. Horses, donkeys, yaks, and dozens of local porters provided transport. The expeditions arrived at Mount Everest in late April and only had until June before the monsoon began, allowing only six to eight weeks for altitude acclimatisation, setting up camps, and the actual climbing attempts.

A secondary task for the expedition was to survey the area around the West Rongbuk Glacier. The Survey of India sent Hari Singh Thapa, a Gurkha surveyor, with the expedition who was assisted in climbing to the difficult areas to survey.

== Preparations ==
Two expeditions preceded the 1924 effort. The first in 1921 was an exploratory expedition led by Harold Raeburn which described a potential route along the whole Northeast Ridge. Later George Mallory proposed a longer modified climb to the North Col, then along the North Ridge to reach the Northeast Ridge, and then on to the summit. This approach seemed to be the "easiest" terrain to reach the top. After they had discovered access to the base of the North Col via the East Rongbuk Glacier, the complete route was explored and appeared to be the superior option. Several attempts on Mallory's proposed route occurred during the 1922 expedition.

After this expedition, insufficient time for preparation and a lack of financial means prevented an expedition in 1923. The Common Everest Committee had lost £700 (equivalent to £36,598 in 2025) in the bankruptcy of the Alliance Bank of Simla, causing the third expedition to be postponed until 1924.

Like the two earlier expeditions, the 1924 expedition was also planned, financed and organised by the membership of the Royal Geographical Society, the Alpine Club, and a major contribution by Captain John Noel, who thereby purchased all photographic rights. The Mount Everest Committee which they formed used military strategies, with some military personnel.

One important change was the role of the porters. The 1922 expedition recognised several of them were capable of gaining great heights and quickly learning mountaineering skills. The changed climbing strategy increased their involvement, later culminating in an equal partnership of Tenzing Norgay for the first known ascent in 1953 together with Edmund Hillary. The gradual reversal in the system of "Sahib – Porter" from the earliest expeditions eventually led to a "professional – client" situation where the Sherpa "porters" are the mountaineering professionals to clients.

Like the 1922 expedition, the 1924 expedition also brought bottled oxygen to the mountain. The oxygen equipment had been improved during the two intervening years, but was still not very reliable, and there was no clear agreement whether to use this assistance at all.

=== Participants ===
The expedition was headed by the same leader as the 1922 expedition, General Charles G. Bruce. He was responsible for managing equipment and supplies, hiring porters and choosing the route to the mountain.

The question of which mountaineers would comprise the climbing party was no easy one. As a consequence of World War I, there was a lack of a whole generation of strong young men. George Mallory was again part of the mission, along with Howard Somervell, Edward "Teddy" Norton and Geoffrey Bruce. George Ingle Finch, who had gained the record height in 1922, was proposed as a member but eventually was not included. The influential Secretary of the committee, Arthur Hinks, made it clear that for an Australian to be first on Everest was not acceptable; the British wanted the climb to be an example of British spirit to lift morale. Mallory refused to climb again without Finch, but changed his mind after being personally persuaded by the British royal family at Hinks's request.

The new members of the climbing team included Noel Odell, Bentley Beetham and John de Vars Hazard. Andrew "Sandy" Irvine, an engineering student whom Odell knew from an expedition to Spitsbergen in 1923, was a so-called "experiment" for the team and a test for "young blood" on the slopes of Mount Everest. Due to his technical and mechanical expertise, Irvine was able to enhance the capacities of the oxygen equipment, to decrease the weight, and to perform numerous repairs to it and other expedition equipment.

The participants were not only selected for their mountaineering abilities; the status of their families and any military experience or university degrees were also factors in the selection procedures. Military experience was of the highest importance in the public image and communication to the newspapers. Quaker-educated Richard B. Graham, b. 1893 (Bootham School, York, 1906–10) was also nominated by Bruce but the committee withdrew the nomination, due to some members of the team not wishing to climb with a conscientious objector.

The full expedition team consisted of 60 porters and the following members:

Name	Function	Profession
Charles G. Bruce	head of expedition	soldier (officer, Brigadier-General)
Edward F. Norton	deputy head of expedition, mountaineer	soldier (officer, Lieutenant-Colonel)
George Mallory	mountaineer	teacher
Bentley Beetham	mountaineer	teacher
Geoffrey Bruce	mountaineer	soldier (officer, Captain)
John de Vars Hazard	mountaineer	engineer
R.W.G. Hingston	expedition doctor	medical doctor and soldier (officer, Major)
Andrew Irvine	mountaineer	engineering student
John B. L. Noel	photographer, movie camera operator	soldier (officer, Captain)
Noel E. Odell	mountaineer	geologist
E. O. Shebbeare	transport officer, interpreter	forester
Dr. T. Howard Somervell	mountaineer	medical doctor

== Journey ==
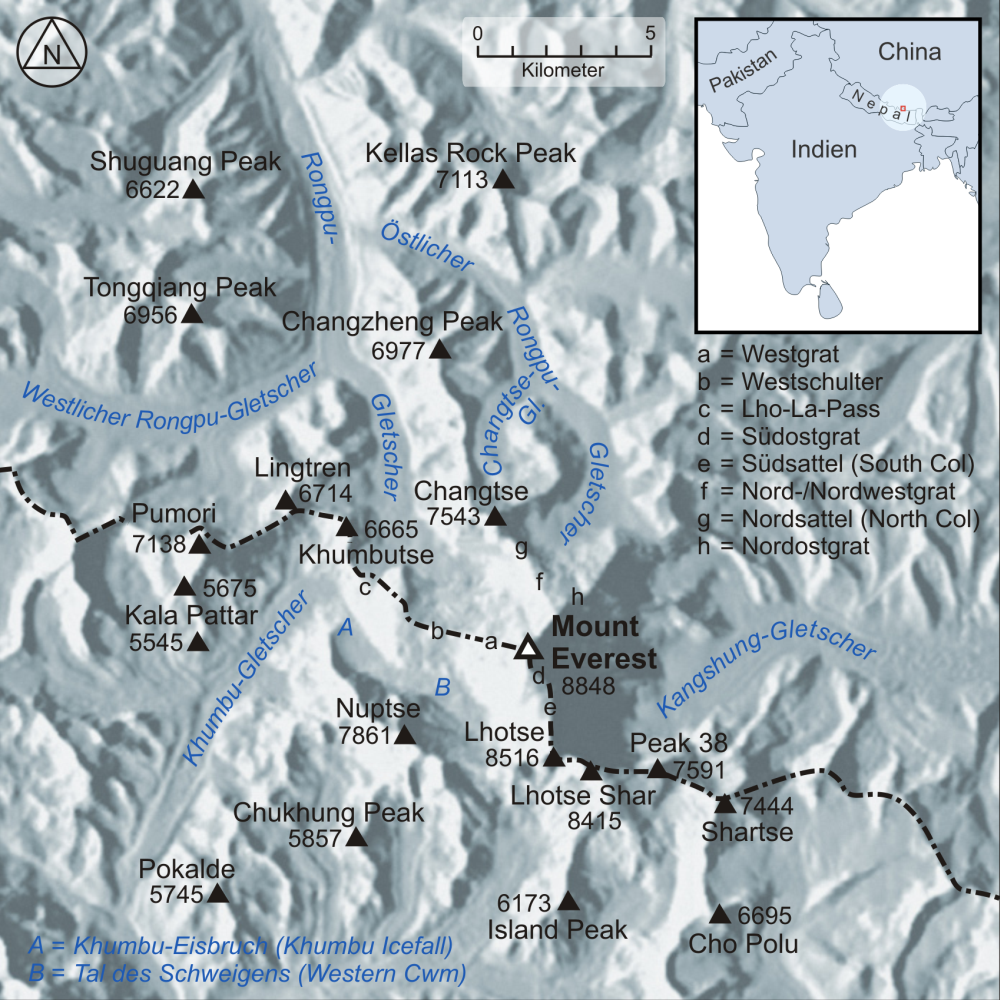
Map of Mount Everest

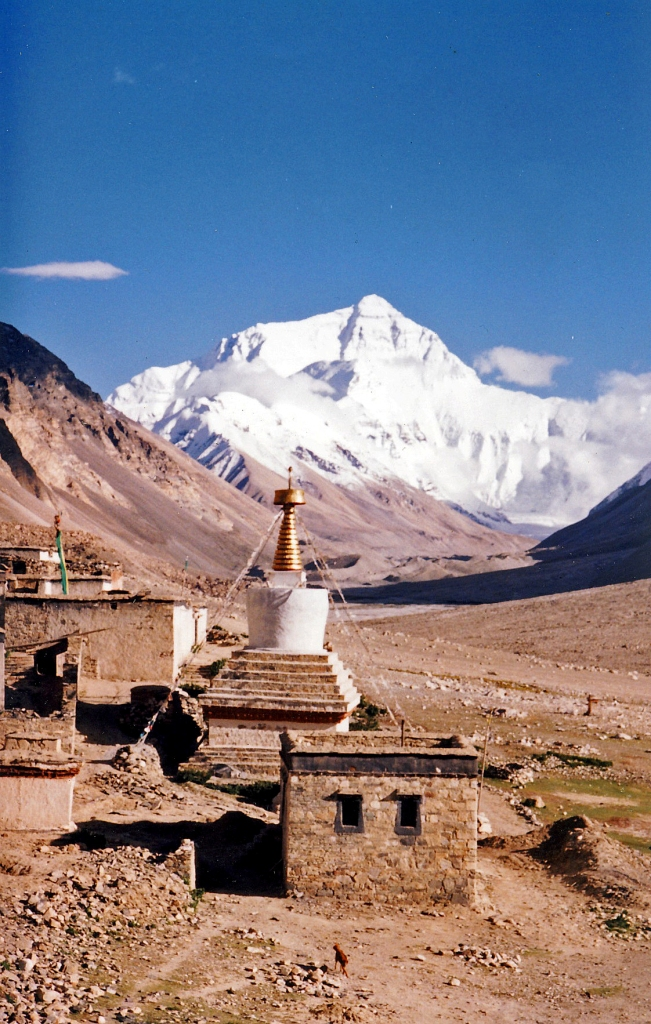
Rombuk Gompa, at end of valley facing the North Face of Mount Everest

At the end of February 1924, Charles and Geoffrey Bruce, Norton and Shebbeare arrived in Darjeeling where they selected the porters from Tibetans and Sherpas. They once again engaged the Tibetan born Karma Paul for translation purposes and Gyalzen for sardar (leader of the porters) and purchased food and material. At the end of March 1924, all expedition members were assembled and the journey to Mount Everest began. They followed the same route as the 1921 and 1922 expeditions. To avoid overloading the dak bungalows, they travelled in two groups and arrived in Yatung at the beginning of April. Phari Dzong was reached on 5 April. After negotiations with Tibetan authorities, the main part of the expedition followed the known route to Kampa Dzong while Charles Bruce and a smaller group chose an easier route. During this stage, Bruce was crippled with malaria and was forced to relinquish his leadership role to Norton. On 23 April the expedition reached Shekar Dzong. They arrived at the Rongbuk Monastery on 28 April, some kilometres from the planned base camp. The Lama of Rongbuk Monastery was ill and could not speak with the British members and the porters or perform the Buddhist puja ceremonies. The following day the expedition reached the location of the base camp at the glacier end of the Rongbuk valley. Weather conditions were good during the approach but now the weather was cold and snowy.

== Planned access route ==
As the kingdom of Nepal was forbidden to foreigners, the British expeditions before the Second World War could only gain access to the north side of the mountain. In 1921, Mallory had seen a possible route from the North Col to go to the top. This route follows the East Rongbuk Glacier to the North Col. From there, the windy ridges (North Ridge, Northeast Ridge) seemed to allow a practical route to the top. On the Northeast Ridge a formidable obstacle blocks the route in the form of steep cliff called the Second Step at 8,605 metres (28,232 ft), whose difficulty was unknown in 1924. The second step massive is a suddenly steeper stratum of rock with a total height of 30 metres (98 ft). The crux is a 5 metres (16 ft) cliff that was first verifiably climbed by the Chinese in 1960. Since 1975 it has been bridged with a ladder. After that point, the ridge route leads to the summit by a steep (45-degree) snow slope, the "triangular snow field" on the summit pyramid, and thence to the summit ridge.

The first men to travel this route to the summit were the Chinese in 1960, along the Northeast Ridge. The British since 1922 had made their ascent attempts significantly down the ridge, crossed the giant North Face to the Great Couloir (later called the "Norton Couloir"), climbed along the borderline of the couloir, and then attempted to reach the summit pyramid. This route was unsuccessful until Reinhold Messner followed it for his solo ascent in 1980. The exact route of the Mallory and Irvine ascent is not known. They either used the natural Norton/Harris route—cutting diagonally through the Yellow Band ledges to the Northeast Ridge or, possibly, following the North Ridge straight up to the Northeast Ridge. It is unknown whether either of them reached the summit. The diagonal traverse of the North face to breach the Second Step strata through the beginning of the Great (Norton) Couloir was a potential alternative to the ridge route, but it is rarely used.

== Erection of the camps ==
The positions of the high camps were planned before the expedition took place. Camp I (5400 m) was erected as an intermediate camp at the entrance of the East Rongbuk Glacier to the main valley. Camp II (about 6000 m) was erected as another intermediate camp, halfway to Camp III (advanced base camp, 6400 m) about 1 km from the icy slopes leading up to the North Col.

Supplies were transported by about 150 porters from base camp to advanced base camp. The porters were paid around one shilling per day. At the end of April, they expanded the camp positions, a job which was finished in the first week of May.

Further climbing activities were delayed because of a snow storm. On 15 May, the expedition members received the blessings of the Lama at the Rongbuk Monastery. As the weather started to improve, Norton, Mallory, Somervell, and Odell arrived on 19 May at Camp III. One day later, they started to fix ropes on the icy slopes to the North Col. They erected Camp IV on 21 May at a height of 7,000 metres (22,970 ft).

Once again the weather conditions deteriorated. John de Vars Hazard remained in Camp IV on the North Col with twelve porters and little food. Eventually, Hazard was able to climb down, but only eight porters came with him. The other four porters, who had become ill, were rescued by Norton, Mallory, and Somervell. The whole expedition returned to Camp I. There, fifteen porters who had demonstrated the most strength and competence in climbing were elected as so called "tigers".

== Summit attempts ==
The first attempt was scheduled for Mallory and Bruce, and after that Somervell and Norton would get a chance. Odell and Irvine would support the summit teams from Camp IV on the North Col while Hazard provided support from Camp III. The supporters would also form the reserve teams for a third try. The first and second attempts were done without bottled oxygen.

=== First: Mallory and Bruce ===
On 1 June 1924 Mallory and Bruce began their first attempt from the North Col, supported by nine "tiger" porters. Camp IV was situated in a relatively protected space some 50 metres (160 ft) below the lip of the North Col; when they left the shelter of the ice walls they were exposed to harsh, icy winds sweeping across the North Face. Before they were able to establish Camp V at 7,681 metres (25,200 ft), four porters abandoned their loads and turned back. While Mallory erected the platforms for the tents, Bruce and one tiger retrieved the abandoned loads. The following day, three tigers also objected to climbing higher, and the attempt was aborted without erecting Camp VI as planned at 8,170 metres (26,800 ft). Halfway down to Camp IV, the first summit team met Norton and Somervell who had just started their attempt.

=== Second: Norton and Somervell ===
The second attempt was started on 2 June by Norton and Somervell with the support of six porters. They were astonished to see Mallory and Bruce descending so early and wondered if their porters would also refuse to continue beyond Camp V. This fear was partially realised when two porters were sent "home" to Camp IV, but the other four porters, Lhakpa Chedi, Norbu Yishang, Lobsang Tashi and Semchumbi, spent the night in Camp V with the two English climbers. Norton was not able to persuade Lobsang Tashi but the other three porters, including Semchumbi had been injured by rockfall during the night but despite this he, Lhakpa Chedi and Norbu Yishang continued up the mountain and carried the 50 pound load to establish Camp VI 8,138 m (26,700 ft) in a small niche - the highest altitude on any mountain to which loads had ever been carried (and without using supplemental oxygen). The porters were then sent back to Camp IV on the North Col. Somervell later wrote that "our start even then was due entirely to one man, Lhakpa Chédi, stoutest-hearted of our porters, without whose lead it is probable that the other three would have refused to go on".

On 4 June, Norton and Somervell were able to start their summit bid at 6:40 a.m., later than originally planned. A spilled water bottle caused the delay, and a new quantity had to be melted. But the litre of water each man took was wholly inadequate for their climb, and a chronic shortcoming of the pre-WWII climbs. Weather was ideal. After ascending the North Ridge more than 200 metres (660 ft), they decided to traverse the North Face diagonally but, not breathing supplemental oxygen, the effect of altitude forced them to stop frequently to rest.

Around 12 o'clock, Somervell was no longer able to climb higher. Norton continued alone and traversed to the deep gulley which leads to the eastern foot of the summit pyramid. This gulley was named "Norton Couloir" or "Great Couloir". During this solo climb, Somervell took one of the most remarkable photographs in mountaineering history. It shows Norton near his high point of 8,572.8 metres (28,126 ft) where he tried to climb over steep, icy terrain with some spots of fresh snow. This altitude established a confirmed world record climbing altitude which was not surpassed for another 28 years; the 1952 Swiss Mount Everest Expedition, when Raymond Lambert and Tenzing Norgay reached 8,611 metres (28,251 ft) on the south side of Everest.

The summit was less than 280 m (920 ft) above Norton when he decided to turn around because of increasing terrain difficulty, insufficient time and doubts of his remaining strength. He re-joined Somervell at 2:00 p.m. and they descended. Shortly after they joined up, Somervell accidentally dropped his ice axe and it fell down the North Face and out of view.

While following Norton, Somervell suffered a severe problem with a blockage of his throat, and he sat down to await his death. In a desperate last attempt, he compressed his lungs with his arms, and suddenly disgorged the blockage – which he described as the lining of his throat. He then followed Norton, who was by now 30 minutes ahead, unaware of the life-threatening episode to his partner.

Below Camp V it had turned dark, but they managed to reach Camp IV at 9:30 p.m. and were using "electric torches". They were offered oxygen bottles by Mallory (a sign of his conversion to the shunned aid) but their first wish was to drink water. During the night, Mallory discussed his plan with expedition leader Norton, to make a final attempt with Andrew Irvine and to use oxygen.

That night, Norton was struck with a severe pain in his eyes. By morning, he was completely snow blind and remained blinded for sixty hours. Norton remained in Camp IV on 5 June because he was most familiar with Nepalese and he assisted with co-ordinating the porters from his tent. On 6 June, Norton was carried down to Camp III (Advanced Base Camp) by a group of six porters who took turns carrying him. In the film, The Epic of Everest, Norton is seen being carried by one of the porters into Camp III.

=== Third: Mallory and Irvine ===
While Somervell and Norton ascended, Mallory and Bruce had climbed down to Camp III (ABC) and returned to the Camp IV (North Col) with oxygen.

On 5 June Mallory and Irvine were in Camp IV. Mallory spoke with Norton about his selection of Sandy Irvine as his climbing partner. Since Norton was the expedition leader after the illness of Bruce, and Mallory was the chief climber, he decided not to challenge Mallory's plan, in spite of Irvine's inexperience in high-altitude climbing. Irvine was not chosen primarily for his climbing abilities; rather, it was due to his practical skill with the oxygen equipment. Mallory and Irvine had also become fast friends since they shared a lot of time on board SS California to India, and Mallory considered the personable 22-year-old as "strong as an ox".

On 6 June, Mallory and Irvine departed for Camp V at 8:40 a.m. with eight porters. They carried the modified oxygen apparatus with two cylinders as well as a day's ration of food. Their load was estimated to be 25 lbs each. Odell took their picture, which would end up being the last close up picture taken of the pair alive. The film The Epic of Everest captures a scene from that day of a party of ten people moving up the ridge, but at over two miles distance, only tiny figures can be seen. That evening shortly after 5 pm, four of the porters returned from Camp V with a note from Mallory which said, "There is no wind here, and things look hopeful."

On 7 June, Odell and Nema, a porter, went to Camp V to support the summit team. On the trip to Camp V, Odell picked up an oxygen-breathing set which had been abandoned by Irvine on the ridge only to discover that it was missing its mouthpiece. Odell carried it up to Camp V in hopes of finding an extra mouthpiece there but did not find one. Shortly after Odell arrived in Camp V, the four remaining porters who had assisted Mallory and Irvine returned from Camp VI. The porters gave Odell the following message:

Dear Odell,---

We're awfully sorry to have left things in such a mess – our Unna Cooker rolled down the slope at the last moment. Be sure of getting back to IV to-morrow in time to evacuate before dark, as I hope to. In the tent I must have left a compass – for the Lord's sake rescue it: we are without. To here on 90 atmospheres for two days – so we'll probably go on two cylinders – but it's a bloody load for climbing. Perfect weather for the job!

Yours ever,

G Mallory

Another message carried by the porters read:

Dear Noel,
We'll probably start early to-morrow (8th) to have clear weather. It won't be too early to start looking out for us either crossing the rockband under the pyramid or going up skyline at 8.0 p.m.
Yours ever
G Mallory

(Mallory really meant 8 a.m., not 8 p.m.) Mallory referred to the climbers by their last names, thus, his letter to Odell starts, "Dear Odell" (Odell's first name is Noel), while his letter to John Noel starts "Dear Noel." Nema was getting sick and Odell dispatched him and the remaining four porters back to Camp IV with a letter to Hazard.

John Noel received the letter and understood the mistake between "p.m." and "a.m.". He also knew the location Mallory was referring to, as he and Mallory had discussed it previously, and both the "skyline" and the "rockband" could be seen at the same time through the camera.

On 8 June, John Noel and two porters were at the photographic lookout point above Camp III (Advanced Base Camp) at 8:00 a.m. looking for the climbers. They took turns with a telescope, and if anything were seen, Noel would turn the camera on—which was already focused upon the agreed spot. They did not spot anyone and could see the summit ridge until 10:00 a.m. when clouds blocked the view.

On the morning of 8 June, Odell awoke at 6:00 a.m., reporting that the night was largely free of wind and that he slept well. At 8:00 a.m., Odell started an ascent to Camp VI to make geological studies and to support Mallory and Irvine. The mountain was swept by mists, so he could not see the Northeast Ridge clearly, along which Mallory and Irvine had intended to climb. At about 7,925 metres (26,000 ft) he climbed over a small outcropping. At 12:50 p.m., the mists suddenly cleared. Odell noted in his diary, "saw M & I on the ridge, nearing base of final pyramide". In a first report on 5 July to The Times he clarified this view. Odell was excited about having found the first fossils on Everest when there was a clearing in the weather and he saw the summit ridge and final pyramid of Everest. His eyes caught a tiny black dot which moved on a small snowcrest beneath a rock-step on the ridge. A second black dot was moving toward the first one. The first dot reached the crest of the ridge ("broke skyline"). He could not be certain if the second dot also did so.

Odell's initial description, as published in The Times (‘…the place on the ridge mentioned is a prominent rock step, at a very short distance from the base of the final pyramid…’) can only be a reference to what is now known as the Third Step. But when the expedition leader, Norton, wrote his official history the following year it had been changed, and now referred to the two climbers reaching the base of the Second Step instead. He was concerned because Mallory and Irvine seemed to be five hours behind their schedule. After this sighting, Odell continued on to Camp VI where he found the tent in chaotic disorder. At 2:00 p.m. an intense snow squall began. Odell went out in the squall hoping to signal the two climbers who he believed would by now be descending. He whistled and shouted, hoping to lead them back to the tent, but gave up because of the intense cold. Odell holed up in C-VI until the squall ended at 4:00 p.m. He then scanned the mountain for Mallory and Irvine but saw no one.

Because the single C-VI tent could only sleep two, Mallory had advised Odell to leave Camp VI and return to Camp IV on the North Col. Odell left C-VI at 4:30 p.m. arrived at C-IV at 6:45 p.m. As they had not seen any sign from Mallory and Irvine then or the next day, Odell again climbed up the mountain together with two porters. Around 3:30 p.m., they arrived at Camp V and stayed for the night. The following day Odell again went alone to Camp VI which he found unchanged. He then climbed up to around 8200m but could not see any trace of the two missing climbers. In Camp VI he laid 6 blankets in a cross on the snow which was the signal for "No trace can be found, Given up hope, Awaiting orders" to the advanced base camp. Odell climbed down to Camp IV. In the morning of 11 June they started to leave the mountain by climbing down the icy slopes of North Col to end the expedition. Five days later they said goodbye to the Lama at Rongbuk Monastery.

== After the expedition ==
The expedition participants erected a memorial cairn in honour of the men who had died in the 1920s on Mount Everest. Mallory and Irvine became national heroes. Magdalene College, one of the constituent colleges of the University of Cambridge, where Mallory had studied, erected a memorial stone in one of its courts – a court renamed for Mallory. The University of Oxford, where Irvine studied, erected a memorial stone in his memory. In St Paul's Cathedral a ceremony took place which was attended by King George V and other dignitaries, as well as the families and friends of the climbers.

The official film of the expedition The Epic of Everest, produced by John Noel, caused a diplomatic controversy later known as the Affair of the Dancing Lamas. A group of monks was taken clandestinely from Tibet to perform a song and dance act before each showing of the film. This greatly offended the Tibetan authorities. Because of this and various unauthorised activities during the expedition, the Dalai Lama did not allow access for further expeditions until 1933.

=== Odell's sighting of Mallory and Irvine ===
The opinion of the Everest climbing community began to challenge the location Odell claimed to have seen the two climbers. Many thought the Second Step, if not unclimbable, was at least not climbable in the five minutes Odell says he saw one of the two surmount it. Based on their position, both Odell and Norton believed that Mallory and Irvine had made it to the summit, with Odell sharing this belief with the newspapers after the expedition. The expedition report was presented to Martin Conway, a prominent politician and mountaineer, who expressed the opinion that the summit had been reached. Conway's opinion was based on their location on the mountain and Mallory's exceptional mountaineering skill.

Under social pressure from the climbing community Odell varied his opinion on several occasions as to the very spot where he had seen the two black dots. Most climbers believe he must have seen them climbing the far easier First Step. In the expedition report he wrote that the climbers were on the second-to-last step below the summit pyramid, indicating the famous and more difficult Second Step. Odell's account of the weather situation also varied. At first, he described that he could see the whole ridge and the summit. Later, he said that only a part of the ridge was free of mist. After viewing photographs of the 1933 expedition, Odell again said that he might have seen the two climbers at the Second Step. Shortly before his death in 1987, he admitted that since 1924 he had never been clear about the exact location along the Northeast Ridge where he had seen the black dots.

A recent theory suggests the two climbers were cresting the First Step after they had given up their climb and were already on the descent. They scrambled up the small hillock to take photographs of the remaining route, much as the French did in 1981, when they too were blocked from further progress. As to which step they were seen on, Conrad Anker has stated that "it's hard to say because Odell was looking at it obliquely ... you're at altitude, the clouds were coming in" but that he believes "they were probably in the vicinity of the First Step when they turned back, because the First Step itself is very challenging and the Second Step is more challenging.... [T]o put them where they might have fallen in the evening and where Mallory's body is resting, because it's a traversing route, he couldn't have fallen off either the First or Second Step and ended up where he was at, they were well to the East of that descending the Yellow Band".

=== Findings ===
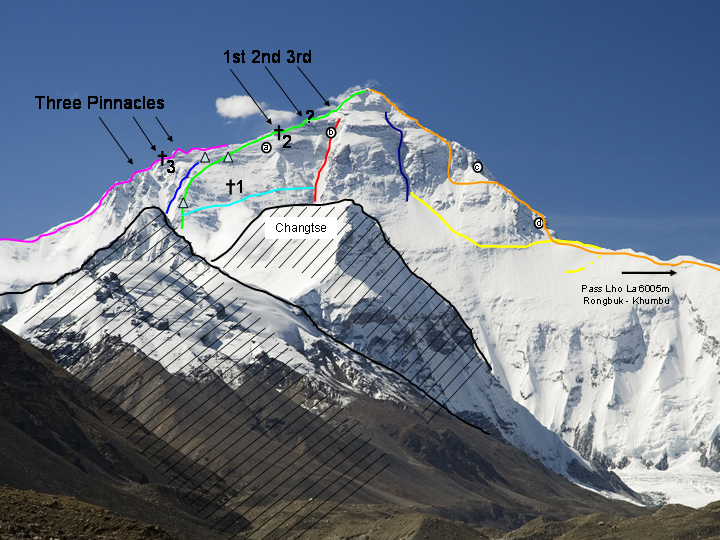
North Face of Mount Everest, routes and important spots: Green line / Normal route, mainly the Mallory route 1924, with high camps at 7700 and 8300 m, the current camp at 8300 m is a little bit west (2 triangles); Red line / Great Couloir or Norton Couloir; †1 / Mallory found 1999; ? / 2nd step, foot at 8605m, height ca. 30 m, difficulty 5.9 or 5.10; a) / spot at ca. 8321 m which was George Ingle Finch's highest point with oxygen, 1922; b) / spot at 8,572.8 m at the western border of the couloir which Edward Felix Norton reached in 1924 without supplemental oxygen

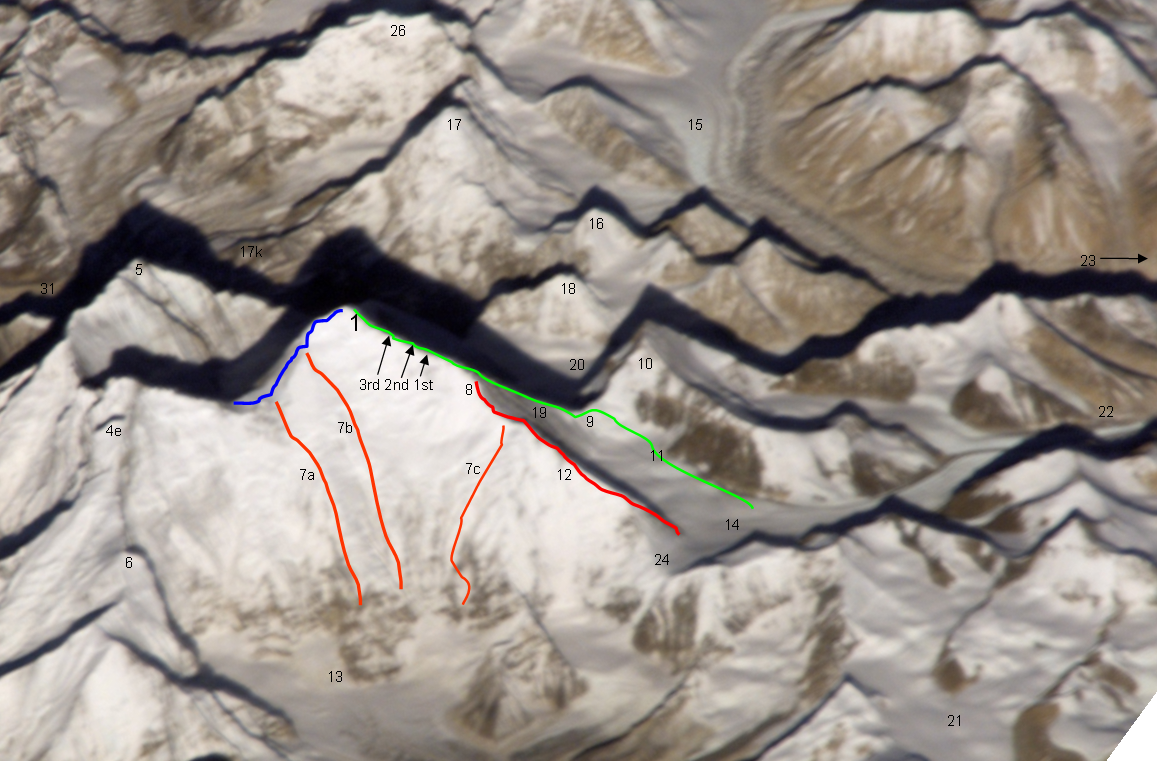
Kangshung face, Mount Everest from east. The typical route north, which is largely identical to the climb of Mallory and Irvine, is marked in green.

"Since my search for the two Oxford fellows, I feel convinced that it marks the scene of an accident to Mallory and Irvine. There is something else ... it's not to be written about, as the press would make an unpleasant sensation. I was scanning the face from the Base camp through a high-power telescope last year [1936] when I saw something queer in a gully below the scree shelf ... it was a long way away and very small ... but I've a six/six eyesight, and I do not believe it was a rock ... when searching for the Oxford men on Mont Blanc, we looked down onto a boulder-strewn glacier and saw something which wasn't a rock either—it proved to be two bodies. The object was at precisely the point where Mallory and Irvine would have fallen had they rolled on over the scree slopes below the yellow band. I think it is highly probable that we shall find further evidence next year."

— Frank Smythe, in a letter to Edward Norton, 4 September 1937.

Odell discovered the first evidence which might reveal something about the climb of Mallory and Irvine among the equipment in camps V and VI. In addition to Mallory's compass, which normally was a critical component for climbing activities, he discovered some oxygen bottles and spare parts. This situation suggests the possibility that there had been a problem with the oxygen equipment which might have caused a delayed start in the morning. A hand-generator electric lamp also remained in the tent – it was still in working order when it was found by the Ruttledge expedition nine years later.

During the 1933 British Mount Everest expedition, Percy Wyn-Harris found the ice axe of Irvine some 250 yards (230 metres) east of the First Step and 60 feet (20 metres) below the ridge. This location raises additional questions. The area is a 30-degree slab of rock with loose pebbles, according to Wyn-Harris. Expedition leader Hugh Ruttledge said: "We have naturally paid close attention to the problem. Firstly, it seems probable that the axe marked the scene of a fatal accident. For reasons already given, neither climber would be likely to abandon it deliberately on the slabs...its presence there would seem to indicate that it was accidentally dropped when a slip occurred or that its owner put it down in order to have both hands free to hold the rope".

In 1937, Frank Smythe wrote to Edward Norton in reply to Norton's approbation of Smythe's book Camp Six, an account of the 1933 expedition. Noted in his letter was the discovery of the ice axe in 1933 found below the crest of the Northeast Ridge, where Smythe felt certain it marked the scene of an accident to Mallory and Irvine. Smythe disclosed that during the 1936 British Mount Everest expedition, he scanned Everest's North Face with a high-powered telescope from Base Camp and spotted an object, which he presumed was the body of either Mallory or Irvine and it was not to be written about because he feared press sensationalism.

On the second summit climb of the Chinese in 1975, the Chinese mountaineer Wang Hongbao saw an "English dead" (body) at 8,100 m (26,575 ft). This news was officially denied by the Chinese Mountaineering Association (CMA), but this report to a Japanese climber, who passed it on to Tom Holzel led to the first Mallory and Irvine Research Expedition in 1986, which was unsuccessful due to bad weather.

Wayne Wilcox reported that in 2008, his wife learned from a British diplomat who had spoken to Pan Duo, a member of the 1975 Chinese expedition, that they had found a body on Everest, and that it had a camera on it. According to Wilcox report, the camera was taken back to Beijing, where an attempt to develop the film was unable to recover any pictures. Author Mark Synnott interviewed Wilcox' wife and the diplomat. The diplomat said his interview of Pan Duo had taken place in 1984, and confirmed Wilcox' telling of the story. In a 2008 interview with the Economist, Pan Duo confirmed the sighting of a body during the 1975 expedition, but said she did not recall finding a camera.

Everest guide Jamie McGuinness recalled a conversation with a Sherpa who said he had encountered the body of Irvine on the mountain in 1995. McGuinness further said he had spoken to a liaison officer of the China Tibet Mountaineering Association in 2010, and asked what he described as a leading question: "When was the body taken of the mountain, was it in 2008?". According to McGuinness, the liaison officer replied "Oh no, the body was thrown off the mountain much earlier than that." McGuinness noted that the "thrown off" was said in way suggesting the officer could not find the right words in English.

In 1999, a new search expedition was mounted, founded by German Everest researcher Jochen Hemmleb, and led by Eric Simonson. Simonson had seen some very old oxygen bottles near the First Step during his first summit climb in 1991. One of these bottles was again found in 1999 and was one belonging to Mallory and Irvine, thus proving the two climbed at least as high as shortly below the First Step. Their location also suggests a climbing speed of approximately 275 vert-ft/hr, good time for the altitude and an indication the oxygen systems were working perfectly. The expedition also tried to reproduce Odell's position when he had seen Mallory and Irvine. The mountaineer Andy Politz later reported that they could clearly identify each of the three steps without any problems. During their meeting, the deputy leader of the 1960 Chinese expedition, Xu Jing, said that on his descent from the First Step, he spotted a dead climber lying on his back, feet facing uphill, in a hollow or slot in the rock. Since no one other than Mallory and Irvine had ever been lost on the north side of Everest before 1960, and Mallory had been found much lower down, it was almost a certainty that Xu had discovered Irvine. However, the sighting was brief, and Xu was in desperate straits during the descent, and while he clearly remembered seeing the body, he was unclear about where it was.

The most remarkable discovery was the corpse of Mallory at an altitude of 8,156 m (26,760 ft). The lack of extreme injuries indicated he had not tumbled very far. His waist showed severe rope-jerk mottling, showing the two had been roped when they fell. Mallory's injuries were such that a walking descent was impossible: his right foot was nearly broken off and there was a golf ball-sized puncture wound in his forehead. His unbroken leg was on top of the broken one, as if to protect it. General Hospital neurosurgeon Dr. Elliot Schwamm believes it not possible that he would have been conscious after the forehead injury. There was no oxygen equipment near the body, but the oxygen bottles would have been empty by that time and discarded at a higher altitude to relinquish the heavy load. Mallory was not wearing snow goggles, although a pair was stored in his vest, which may indicate that he was on the way back by night. However, a contemporary photograph shows he had two sets of goggles when he started his summit climb. The image of his wife Ruth which he intended to put on the summit was not in his vest. He carried the picture throughout the whole expedition—a sign that he might have reached the top. Since his Kodak pocket camera was not found, there is no proof of a successful climb to the summit.

In September 2024, a National Geographic documentary team that included the photographer and director Jimmy Chin, along with filmmakers and climbers Erich Roepke and Mark Fisher were descending the Central Rongbuk Glacier when they found an oxygen bottle marked with a date 1933. Chin mentioned to Erich Roepke that if Irvine had fallen down the North Face, his remains or his body could be nearby. The team speculated that if an oxygen canister had fallen off the mountain, “it probably fell down quite a bit farther than a body—more like a missile.” Chin suspected that Irvine's remains could potentially be a few hundred yards up the glacier. In the following days, Chin and his team began taking a circuitous route across the folds and crevasses of the glacier. Erich then spotted a boot emerging from the ice. The remains were found at the Central Rongbuk Glacier which is at an altitude at least 7,000 feet lower than where Mallory's body was discovered. A sock, with "A. C. Irvine" on a name tape, was found along with a boot and a foot, emerging from the ice. The cameras remain missing.

== First ascent speculation ==
Since 1924, there have been supporting claims and rumours that Mallory and Irvine had been successful and so were actually the first to reach the summit of Mount Everest. One counter argument claims that their fleece, vests and trousers were of too poor a quality. In 2006, Graham Hoyland climbed to 6,401 m (21,000 ft) in an exact reproduction of Mallory's original clothing for a field test. He stated in Alpine Journal that it functioned very well and was quite comfortable. The Performance Clothing Research Centre at the University of Leeds tested the reproduced outfit thoroughly and "concluded that Mallory was sufficiently well insulated to operate effectively on Everest, provided he was moving and not forced to bivouac."

Human thermo-regulation expert George Havenith of Loughborough University (UK), has tested a rigorously accurate recreation of Mallory's clothing in a weather chamber. He concludes that the clothing is sufficient to −30 °C (−22 °F), though "If the wind speed had picked up, a common feature of weather on Everest, the insulation of the clothing would only just be sufficient to −10 °C (14 °F). Mallory would not have survived any deterioration in conditions."

Odell's sighting is of especially high interest. The description of Odell's sighting and the current knowledge indicate Mallory's 5-minute surmounting of the Second Step is unlikely. This wall cannot be climbed as fast as described by Odell. Only the first and the third step can be climbed quickly. Odell said that they were at the foot of the summit pyramid, which contradicts a location at the First Step, but it is unlikely the pair could have started early enough to reach the Third Step by 12:50 p.m. Since the First Step is far away from the Third Step, confusing them is also not likely. One suggestion proposes that Odell confused a sighting of birds for climbers, as occurred with Eric Shipton in 1933.

This speculation also involves theories concerning whether Mallory and Irvine could have managed to climb the Second Step. Òscar Cadiach was the first to climb it in 1985 free and rated it V+. Conrad Anker led an experiment to free climb this section without using the "Chinese ladder" for assistance, since that equipment was not installed in 1924. In 1999, he did not manage a complete free climb as he put one foot briefly on the ladder when it blocked the only available foothold. At that time he rated the difficulty of the Second Step as 5.10—well outside of Mallory's capability. In June 2007, Anker returned as a member of the Altitude Everest Expedition 2007, and with Leo Houlding successfully free-climbed the Second Step, after removing the "Chinese ladder" (which was later replaced). Houlding rated the climb at 5.9, just within Mallory's estimated capabilities. Theo Fritsche climbed the step free solo on-sight in 2001 and rated it V+.

An argument against the possible summit claim is the long distance from high camp VI to the summit. It is normally not possible to reach the summit before dark after starting in daylight. It was not until 1990 that Ed Viesturs was able to reach the top from an equivalent distance as Mallory and Irvine planned. In addition, Viesturs knew the route, while for Mallory and Irvine it was completely unknown territory. Finally, Irvine was not an experienced climber and it is considered unlikely that Mallory had put his friend into such danger or would have aimed for the summit without calculating the risks.

Despite the discovery of Mallory's body on 1 May 1999, exactly how and where the two climbers died is still unknown.

Modern climbers who take a very similar route start their summit bid from high camp at 8,300 m (27,231 ft) around midnight to avoid the risk of a second night on the descent or a highly risky bivouac without the protection of a tent. They also use headlamps during the dark, a technology which was not used by the early British climbers.

== See also ==
- 1922 British Mount Everest expedition
- Timeline of Mount Everest expeditions
- List of 20th-century summiters of Mount Everest

== Bibliography ==
- Breashears, David; Salkeld, Audrey (2000). Mallorys Geheimnis. Was geschah am Mount Everest?. Steiger. ISBN 3-89652-220-5.
- Hemmleb, Jochen; Johnson, Larry A.; Simonson, Eric R. (2001). Die Geister des Mount Everest: Die Suche nach Mallory und Irvine. Frederking u. Thaler. ISBN 3-89405-108-6.
- Hemmleb, Jochen; Simonson, Eric (2002). Detectives on Everest. The Story of the 2001 Mallory & Irvine Research Expedition (1st ed.). Seattle: The Mountaineers Books. ISBN 0-89886-871-8.
- Holzel, Tom; Salkeld, Audrey (1999). In der Todeszone. Das Geheimnis um George Mallory und die Erstbesteigung des Mount Everest. Goldmann Wilhelm GmbH. ISBN 3-442-15076-0.
- Holzel, Tom and Salkeld, Audrey, co-authors (1996) First on Everest: The Mystery of Mallory & Irvine. New York: 1996 Henry Holt & Co. ISBN 0-8050-0303-7
- Hoyland, Graham (2014). Last Hours on Everest: The Gripping Story of Mallory & Irvine's Fatal Ascent. Glasgow, UK: William Collins, an imprint of HarperCollins. ISBN 978-0-00-745574-4.
- Norton, Edward Felix (2000). Bis zur Spitze des Mount Everest - Die Besteigung 1924. Translated by Willi Rickmer Rickmers. Berlin: Sport Verlag. ISBN 3-328-00872-1.
- Unsworth, Walt (2000). Everest - The Mountaineering History (3rd ed.). Bâton Wicks. ISBN 978-1-898573-40-1.
- Smythe, Tony (2013). My Father, Frank: Unresting Spirit of Everest. Foreword by Doug Scott (1st ed.). Sheffield, UK: Bâton Wicks Publications. ISBN 978-1-898573-87-6. Archived from the original on 31 March 2023.
