= Eric Simonson (mountaineer) =

American mountaineer

Eric Simonson is an American mountain guide who has conducted many expeditions around the globe, including over 30 to the Himalayas. He organized the Mallory and Irvine Research Expedition in 1999 to attempt to resolve the mystery of the outcome of the 1924 British Mount Everest expedition and discovered the body of its lead climber George Mallory.
