= Andrew Irvine (mountaineer) =

British mountaineer (1902–1924)

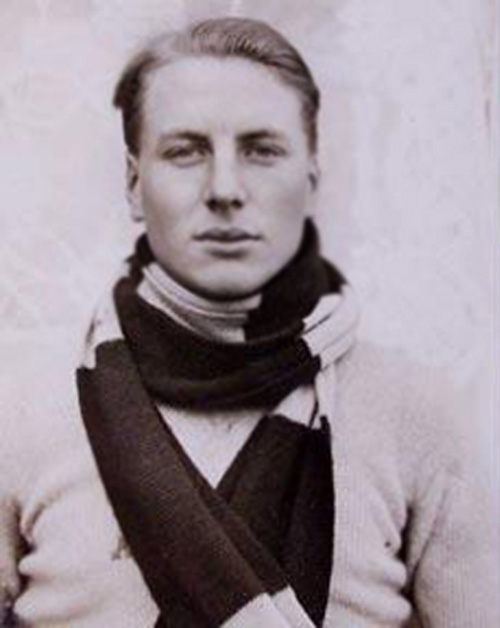
- Irvine, c. 1920
- Born: Andrew Comyn Irvine; 8 April 1902; Birkenhead, Cheshire, England
- Died: 8 or 9 June 1924 (aged 22); North Face, Mount Everest, Tibet
- Cause of death: Mountaineering accident
- Body discovered: September 2024 (partial remains)
- Occupation: Student at Merton College, Oxford
- Relatives: Julie Summers (great-niece)

Andrew Comyn "Sandy" Irvine (8 April 1902 – 8 or 9 June 1924) was a British mountaineer who took part in the 1924 British Mount Everest expedition, the third British expedition to the world's highest mountain. He and his climbing partner George Mallory disappeared high on the mountain's Northeast Ridge, and were last seen alive below the summit. Irvine's partial remains were discovered in 2024.

== Early life ==
Irvine was born in Birkenhead, Cheshire, one of six children of historian William Fergusson Irvine (1869–1962) and Lilian Davies-Colley (1870–1950). His father's family had Scottish and Welsh roots, while his mother was from an old Cheshire family. He was a cousin of journalist and writer Lyn Irvine, and also of pioneering female surgeon Eleanor Davies Colley and of political activist Harriet Shaw Weaver.

He was educated at Birkenhead School and Shrewsbury School, where he demonstrated a natural engineering acumen, able to improvise fixes or improvements to almost anything mechanical. During the First World War, he created a small stir at the War Office by sending them a design for a synchronisation gear to allow a machine gun to fire from a propeller-driven aeroplane through the propeller without damaging its blades, and also a design for a gyroscopic stabiliser for aircraft.

He was also a keen sportsman and particularly excelled at rowing. His prodigious ability as a rower made him a star of the 1919 'Peace Regatta' at Henley with the Royal Shrewsbury School Boat Club, and propelled him to Merton College, Oxford, to study engineering. At Oxford, he joined the Oxford University Mountaineering Club, and was also a member of the Oxford crew for the Oxford and Cambridge Boat Race in 1922 and a member of the winning crew in 1923, the only time Oxford won between 1913 and 1937.

Irvine had an affair with a former chorus girl named Marjory Agnes Standish Summers (née Thompson). Marjory was married to the steel magnate Henry Hall Summers and was 33 years younger than her husband. Summers was one of the sons of founder John Summers, of John Summers & Sons, a steel company. While Irvine was on Everest, Henry began divorce proceedings against Marjory.

== Everest expedition ==
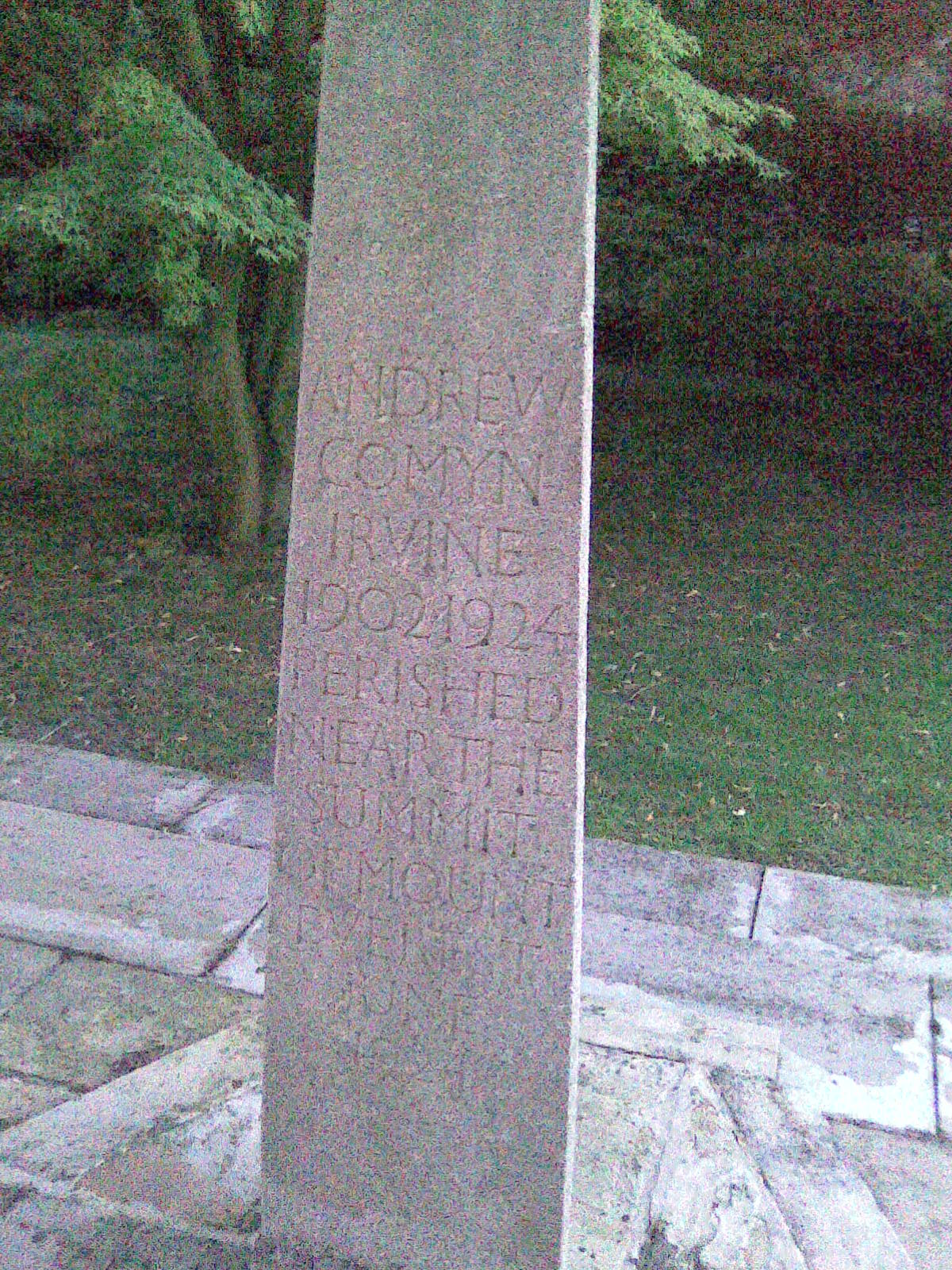
Memorial to Andrew Irvine, by Eric Gill, at Merton College, Oxford

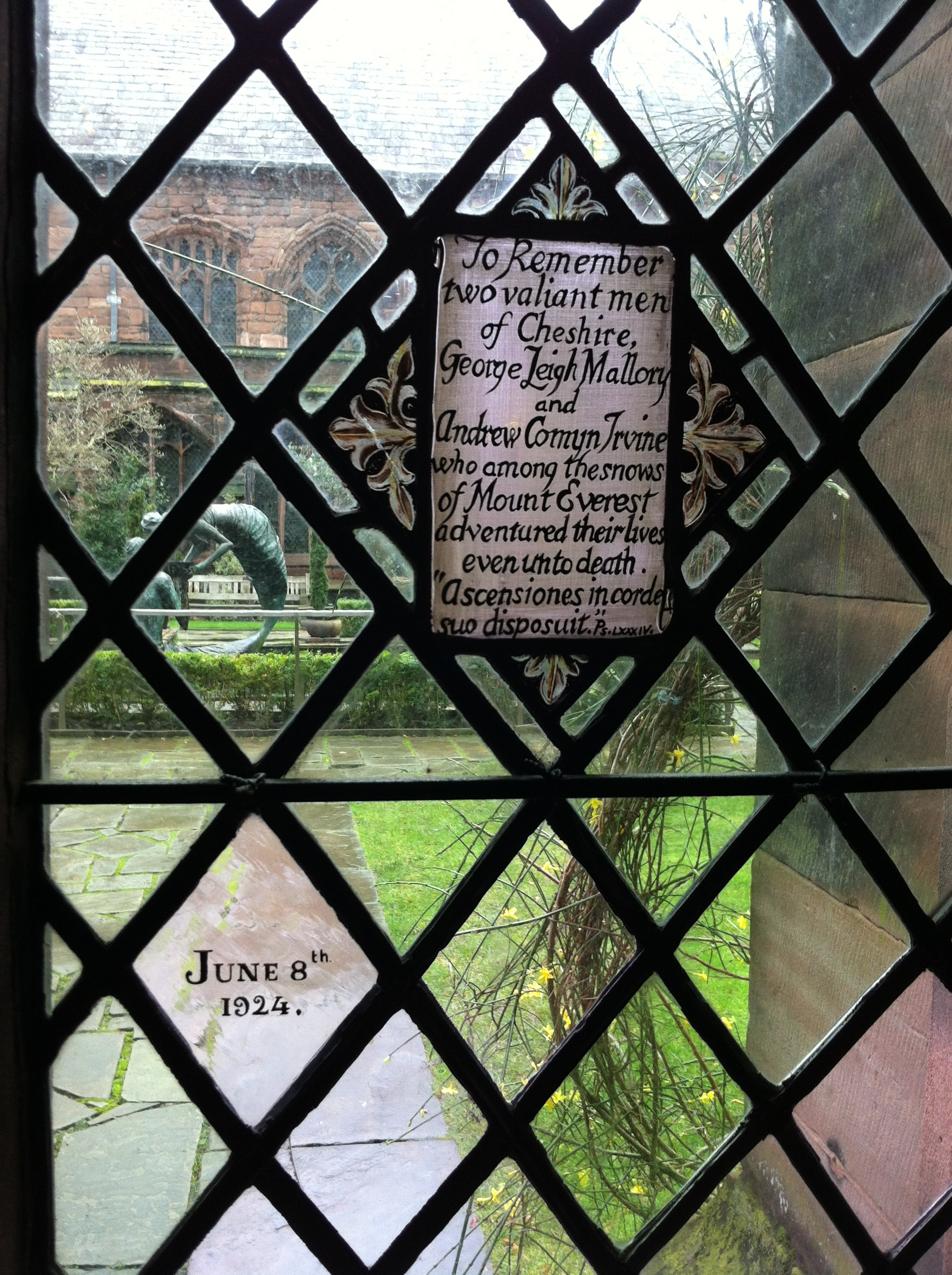
Memorial to George Mallory and Andrew Irvine in Chester Cathedral

In 1923, Irvine took part in the Merton College Arctic Expedition to Spitsbergen which was led by George Binney; Irvine excelled on every front. Other mountaineers on the expedition were Tom Longstaff and Noel Odell. Irvine discovered that he and Odell had met in 1919 when Irvine had ridden his motorcycle to the top of Foel Grach, a 3,000-foot-high Welsh mountain, and surprised Odell and his wife Mona, who had climbed it on foot. Subsequently, on Odell's recommendation, Irvine was invited to join the forthcoming third British Mount Everest expedition on the grounds that he might be the "superman" that the expedition felt it needed. He was at the time still a 21-year-old undergraduate student.

Irvine set sail for the Himalaya from Liverpool on board SS California on 29 February, 1924, along with three other members of the expedition, George Mallory, Bentley Beetham, and John de Vars Hazard. Mallory later wrote home to his wife that Irvine "could be relied on for anything except perhaps conversation".

During the expedition, he made major and crucial innovations to the expedition's professionally designed oxygen sets, radically improving their functionality, lightness, and strength. He also maintained the expedition's cameras, camp beds, primus stoves, and many other devices. He was considered popular and respected by his older colleagues for his ingenuity, companionability, and unstinting hard work.

The expedition made two unsuccessful attempts on the summit in early June, and time remained for only one more before the heavy snowfall that came with the summer monsoon would make climbing too dangerous. This last chance fell to the expedition's most experienced climber, George Mallory. To the surprise of other expedition members, Mallory chose the 22-year-old inexperienced Irvine above the older, more seasoned climber, Noel Odell. Irvine's proficiency with the oxygen equipment was obviously a major factor in Mallory's decision. Later, some debate occurred about the reasons for his choice.

Mallory and Irvine began their ascent from the North Col on 6 June, and by the end of the next day, the pair had reached Camp VI—previously established by Edward Norton and Howard Somervell—a final two-man camp at 8,138 m (26,700 ft), from which they would make their final push for the summit. What time they departed on 8 June is unknown, but circumstantial evidence suggests that they did not have the smooth, early start that Mallory had hoped for.

Odell, who was acting in a supporting role, reported seeing them at 12:50 pm—much later than expected—ascending what he believed was the Second Step of the Northeast Ridge and "going strongly for the top," although in the years that followed, exactly which of the Three Steps Odell had sighted the pair climbing became extremely controversial.

== Traces on the ridge ==
=== Discovery of the ice axe ===
On 30 May 1933, nine years after the disappearance of Mallory and Irvine, Percy Wyn-Harris, a member of the fourth British Everest Expedition, discovered an ice axe at around 8,450 m (27,723 ft), about 18 metres (59 ft) below the crest of the Northeast Ridge, 229 metres (751 ft) east of the First Step. It was found lying loose on brown 'boiler-plate' slabs of rock, which though not particularly steep, were smooth and in places had a covering of loose pebbles. The Swiss manufacturer's name matched those of a number supplied to the 1924 expedition, and since only Mallory and Irvine had climbed that high along the ridge route, it must have belonged to one of them.

Hugh Ruttledge, leader of the 1933 expedition, speculated that the ice axe marked the scene of a fall, during which it was either accidentally dropped or that its owner put it down, possibly to have both hands free to hold the rope. Noel Odell, the last man to see Mallory and Irvine on their ascent in 1924, offered a more benign explanation: that the ice axe had merely been placed there on the ascent to be collected on the way back since the climbing ahead was almost entirely on rock under the prevailing conditions.

In 1963, a characteristic triple nick mark on a military swagger stick, found among Andrew Irvine's possessions, was found to match a similar mark on the ice axe's shaft, suggesting the axe belonged to Irvine. In an interview with PBS, Wyn-Harris, who discovered the ice axe, claimed, "When I picked up the axe there was no mark on it. The cross, over which there has been so much controversy, was not put on either by Mallory or Irvine. It was in fact cut by my personal Sherpa porter, Kusang Pugla, who did it under threats from me that it must not be lost or mixed up with other axes."

=== Discovery of the oxygen cylinder ===
On 15 May 1991, a 1924 oxygen cylinder was discovered by Eric Simonson at approximately 8,475 metres (27,805 ft), some 20 metres (66 ft) higher and 60 metres (200 ft) closer to the First Step than the ice axe found in 1933, and 373 vertical metres from the summit. Since only Mallory and Irvine had been on the Northeast Ridge in 1924, this oxygen cylinder marked the minimum altitude they must have reached on their final climb. The oxygen cylinder was recovered on 17 May 1999.

== Discovery of Mallory ==
On 1 May 1999, Mallory's body was found at 8,156 m (26,760 ft) by the Mallory and Irvine Research Expedition, in a funnel-shaped basin on the "8,200 m Snow Terrace," some 300 metres (980 ft) below and about 100 metres (330 ft) horizontal to the location of the ice axe found in 1933. The remains of a rope still encircled his waist, which exhibited serious haemorrhaging, indicative of a strong rope-jerk injury, and strongly suggesting that at some point either Mallory or Irvine fell while they were still roped together. Mallory was found with relatively few major injuries, compared with modern climbers who had fallen the full distance from the Northeast Ridge and sustained numerous fractures, suggesting he had survived an initial fall and suffered a further accident. A golf ball-sized puncture wound in his forehead seemed to be the likely cause of death, and could have been inflicted by an ice axe. It has been speculated that an injured Mallory was descending in a self-arrest "glissade," sliding down the slope while dragging his ice axe in the snow to control the speed of his descent, and that his ice axe bounced off a rock and killed him.

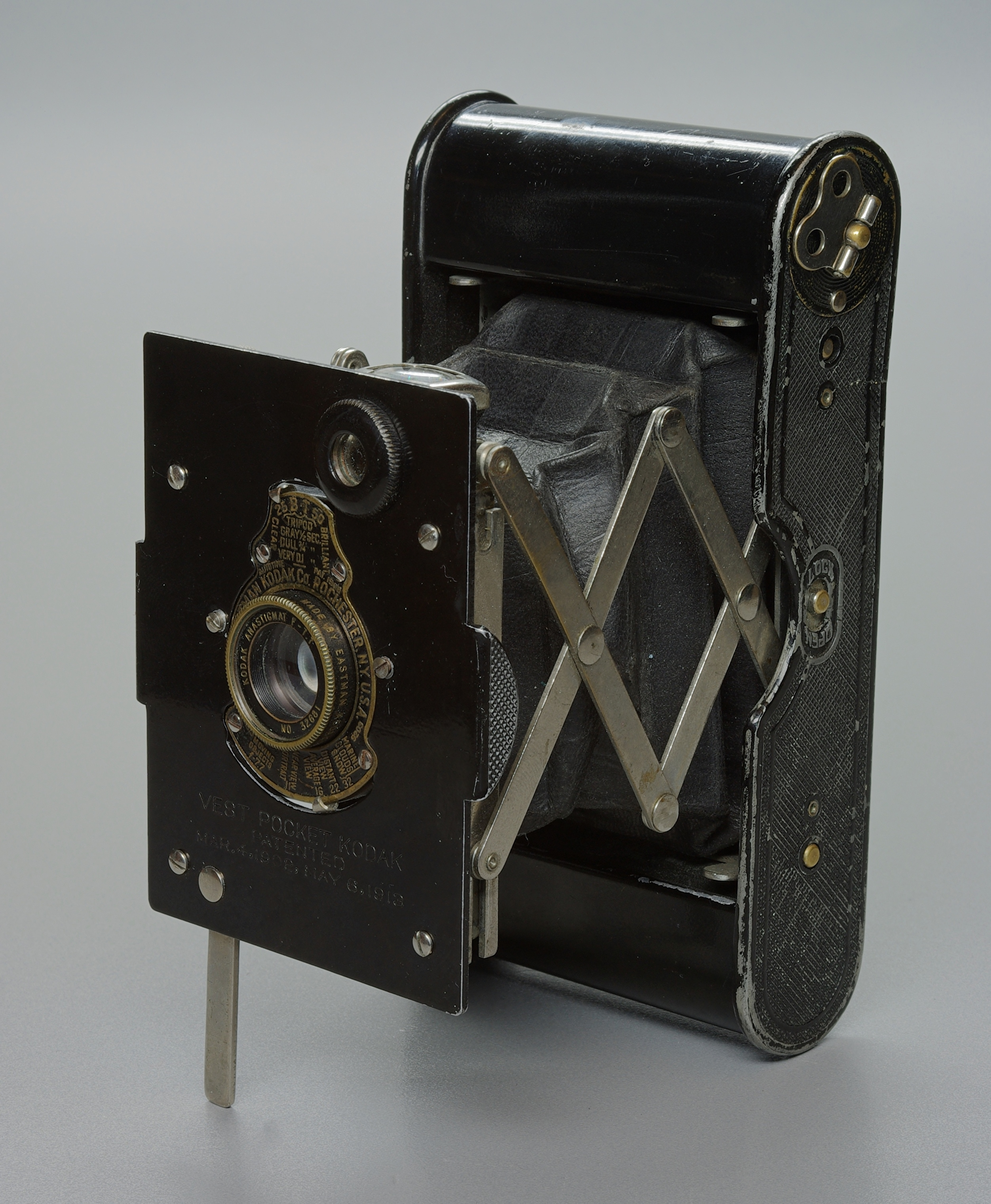
Vest Pocket Kodak

The search revealed no trace of the two Vest Pocket Kodak cameras that Irvine's diaries said he and Mallory were carrying, leading to speculation that one or more of the cameras might yet be found with Irvine's body. Experts from Kodak have said that there is a good chance that the cameras' black-and-white film could be developed to produce "printable images", due to its chemical nature and its likely preservation in subzero temperatures. Such images could illuminate the fate of Mallory and Irvine.

== Possible sightings ==
=== Sighting by Wang Hongbao ===
In 1979, Ryoten Hasegawa, the leader of the Japanese contingent of a Sino-Japanese reconnaissance expedition to the north side of Everest, had a brief conversation with a Chinese climber named Wang Hongbao, in which Wang recounted that while on the 1975 Chinese Everest Expedition, he had seen the body of an "English dead" at, 8,100 m (26,575 ft) lying on his side as if asleep at the foot of a rock. Wang knew the man was British, he said, by the old-fashioned clothing, rotted and disintegrating at the touch, and poked his finger into his cheek to indicate an injury. Wang died in an avalanche the following day before more information could be obtained.

Further confirmation of this sighting was provided by a 1986 conversation that American Everest historian Tom Holzel had with Zhang Junyan, Wang's tent-mate from the 1975 expedition. Zhang said Wang returned from a 20-minute excursion and described finding "a foreign mountaineer" at 8,100 meters. Since no other European climber was known to have died or gone missing at that elevation on the north side of Everest before 1960, it was almost certain that the body was either that of Mallory or Irvine.

Wang's 1975 sighting was the key to the discovery of Mallory's body 24 years later in the same general area, although his reported description of the body he found—"hole in cheek"—is not consistent with the condition and posture of Mallory's body, which was face down, his head almost completely buried in scree, and with a golfball-sized puncture wound on his forehead. One possibility is that Wang actually saw Irvine. Another is that Wang discovered Mallory face up and turned his body over to effect a simple burial.

In 2001, the second Mallory and Irvine Research Expedition discovered Wang's 1975 campsite at 8,170 m (26,804 ft) and made an extensive search of its surroundings, and found that Mallory's remained the only body in the vicinity.

=== Sighting by Xu Jing ===
In 2001, Eric Simonson, leader of the 1999 Mallory and Irvine Expedition, and German researcher Jochen Hemmleb, who inspired it, travelled to Beijing to interview some of the remaining survivors of the 1960 Chinese Mount Everest expedition, which had been the first expedition back to the north side since the British attempts of the 1920s and 1930s.

During their meeting, the deputy leader of the expedition, Xu Jing, said that on his descent from the First Step, he spotted a dead climber lying on his back, feet facing uphill, in a hollow or slot in the rock. Since no one other than Mallory and Irvine had ever been lost on the north side of Everest before 1960, and Mallory had been found much lower down, it was almost certain that Xu had discovered Irvine. However, the sighting was brief, and Xu was in desperate straits during the descent, and while he clearly remembered seeing the body, he was unclear about where it was.

=== Sighting by Wang Fuzhou ===
In 1965, a member of the 1960 Chinese expedition, Wang Fuzhou, told the USSR Geographical Society in Leningrad that, "At an altitude of about 8,600 m (28,215 ft), we found the corpse of a European." He was sure the corpse was European because he was wearing braces.

== 21st-century searches ==
In 2010, a team informally dubbed the Andrew Irvine Search Committee and led by Holzel searched for Irvine in a computer-assembled montage of aerial photographs taken in 1984 by Brad Washburn and the National Geographic Society. They identified a possible object at about 8,425 metres (27,641 ft), less than 100 metres (330 ft) from the ice-axe location, consistent with a body lying in a slot of rock, feet pointing toward the summit, just as Xu described his sighting.

A new expedition organised by Holzel was due to explore the upper slopes of Everest in December 2011, presumably with a view to determining the nature of this possible object. By conducting the expedition in winter, it was hoped that there would be much less snow on the upper slopes, increasing the chances of finding Irvine, as well as the camera that it is hoped will be with him.

In 2019, Mark Synnott led a party that investigated the 'crevice' identified by Holzel as the potential resting place of Irvine, but discovered that it was merely an optical illusion. Synnott later reported on the possibility that the 1975 Chinese expedition may have found both Irvine and the camera.

=== Discovery of partial remains ===
In 2024, a National Geographic team led by Jimmy Chin found what are believed to be Irvine's partial remains on Everest. It is believed that the remains had emerged from a melting glacier. The remains were found at an undisclosed location on the Central Rongbuk Glacier at an altitude at least 2100 metres (7,000 feet) lower than where Mallory’s body was discovered. A detached foot inside a boot and sock, with "A. C. Irvine" on a name tape, was found emerging from the ice. No cameras were found.

== In popular culture ==
The deaths of Mallory and Irvine inspired Baku Yumemakura to write the 1998 novel The Summit of the Gods, which in turn inspired a manga series of the same name published from 2000 to 2003, which was adapted into a French-made anime-influenced animation film, Le Sommet des Dieux, that was released in 2021.

== See also ==
- List of Oxford University Boat Race crews
- List of people who died climbing Mount Everest
- List of solved missing person cases (pre-1950)
- List of unsolved deaths
- The Wildest Dream
