= 1955 French Makalu expedition =

First ascent of fifth-highest mountain in the world

Coordinates: 27°52′48″N 87°04′48″E

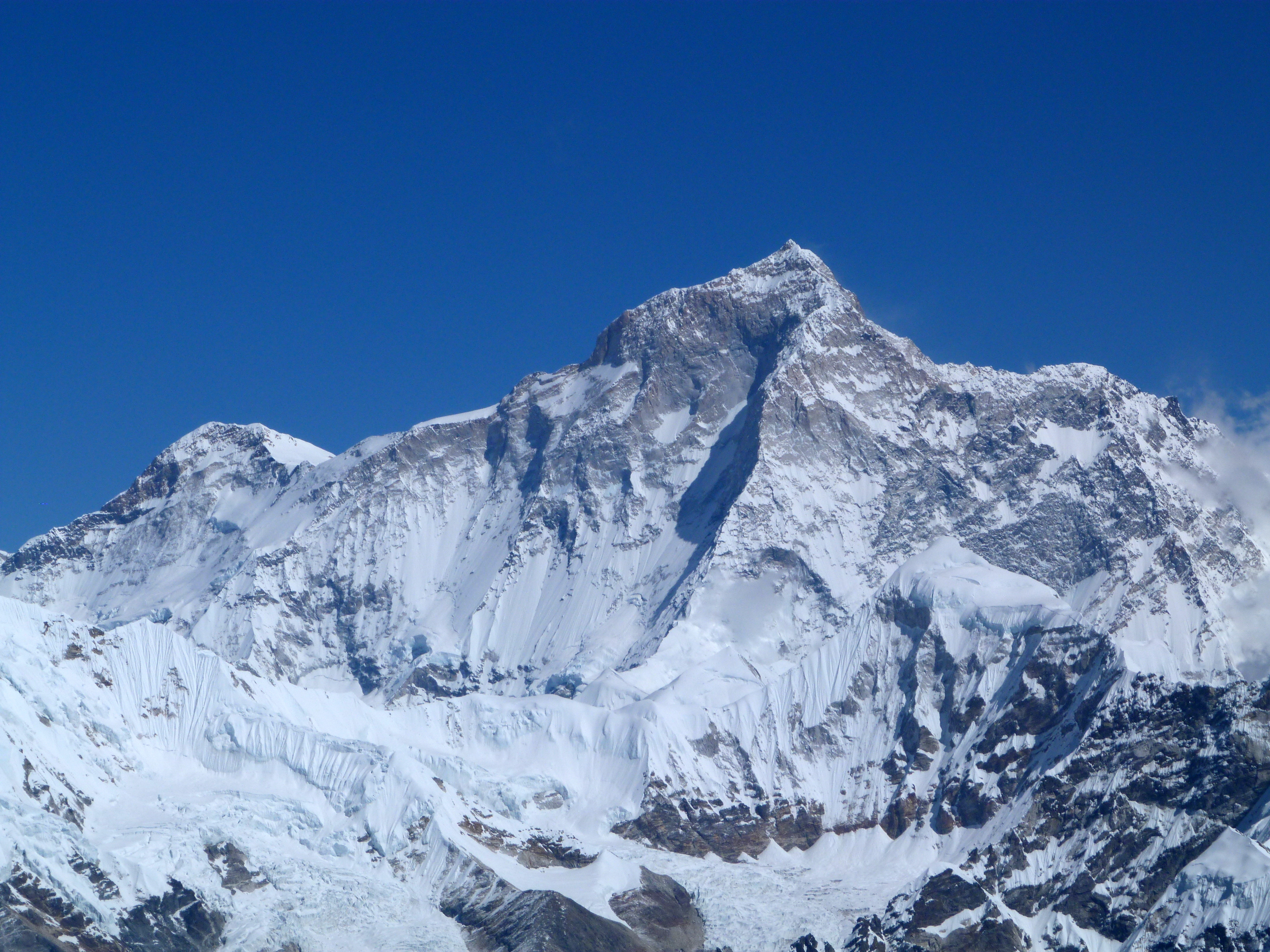
Makalu (centre) and Kangchungtse (Makalu II) with the low point at Makalu Col crossing the northwest ridge between them

The 1955 French Makalu expedition was the first to successfully climb Makalu, the Himalayan mountain 12 miles (19 km) to the southeast of Mount Everest, on the border between Nepal and Tibet. At 8,485 metres (27,838 ft) Makalu is the fifth-highest mountain in the world and an eight-thousander.

The expedition, led by Jean Franco, approached the mountain from the south through Nepal and then wound around into Tibet, to reach the summit from the north face. Thanks to good snow conditions and weather, as well as good leadership, the entire team of mountaineers and one of the Sherpas reached the summit – Jean Couzy and Lionel Terray on 15 May 1955, followed next day by Jean Franco, Guido Magnone and Gyalzen Norbu; and then Jean Bouvier, Serge Coupé, Pierre Leroux and André Vialatte on 17 May.

== Background ==
=== Topography ===
Makalu is, after Mount Everest and Lhotse, the highest mountain on a ridge running east from Everest itself. The east-west Kangshung Glacier and the Kama valley in Tibet lie to the north of the ridge and the Barun Glacier and Barun River in Nepal flow along the southern flank. The high mountains Pethangse, Chago and Kangchungtse (also known as Makalu II) are also on the ridge between Everest and Makalu. At 8,485 metres (27,838 ft) Makalu is the fifth-highest mountain in the world and an eight-thousander. Chomo Lonzo (7,804 metres (25,604 ft)), is on a ridge northeast of Kangchungtse and due north of Makalu.

Makalu is generally in the shape of a four-sided pyramid with its faces scooped out in vast cirques. Of its four ridges, two – the southeast and northwest – form the Tibet–Nepal border and a third ridge, the southwest, slopes down to the Barun Glacier. The west cirque forms the face between the southwest and northwest ridges down which flows the Makalu Glacier and high up beside this glacier lies the smaller northwest cirque.

=== Exploration and climbing history ===
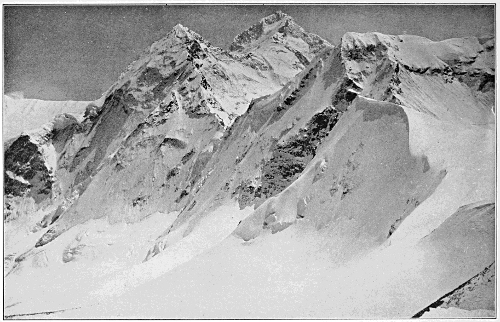
Howard-Bury's 1921 photograph looking southeast showing Kangchungtse, Makalu, and Chago (left to right)

When the 1921 British Mount Everest reconnaissance expedition was exploring the Kama valley to discover whether it afforded a route to Everest from the east, Makalu dominated the southern view. A party led by Charles Howard-Bury on a side excursion reached a 6,600-metre (21,500 ft) peak on the ridge between Makalu and Pethangtse and photographed the scene. (Note: The situation is described at Howard-Bury (1922), p. 150, the photograph is at Howard-Bury (1922), p. 112 and a map showing the locations is at Howard-Bury (1922), Map II.) Local inhabitants thought Makalu was higher than Everest because it is much more visible than Everest which is obscured by the surrounding high peaks. In 1933 after two aircraft had flown over Mount Everest and aerial photographs had been taken of the region, The Times published a special supplement with a full-page photograph on the first page entitled "the awe-inspiring summit of Everest as seen slightly from the north-west" – in fact the photograph was of the northwest ridge of Makalu. In 1951 and 1952 two British reconnaissance expeditions in Nepal assessed the west face of Makalu from a climbing perspective.

In 1954 the first American party to Himalaya, led by William Siri and with Ang Tharkay as sirdar, attempted the mountain from the Barun Glacier via the northwest and southeast ridges. On the latter route they reached 7,150 metres (23,460 ft). At very much the same time a party led by Edmund Hillary also examined the northwest ridge.

Following the French triumph on Annapurna in 1950, Nepal had granted France an opportunity for climbing Everest in 1954 but this became a less prestigious prospect after the British success in 1953. French mountaineers' ideas turned to Makalu because it was an attractive and challenging peak which had not been attempted previously. Exploration as well as mountaineering would be required. They were granted slots for autumn 1954 and spring 1955. So, the same French party that was to reach Makalu's summit in 1955 carried out a reconnaissance expedition in 1954 that reached Makalu Col, (Note: Makalu Col is also called Makalu La.) just below Kangchungtse on Makalu's northwest ridge. From there they reached the summits of Kangchungtse (7,660 metres (25,120 ft)) and Chomo Lonzo and ascended to about 7,800 metres (25,600 ft) on the northwest ridge towards the top of Makalu itself.

== Preparations ==
=== Expedition members ===
In 1954 the climbers were: Jean Franco, leader; (Note: Devies was originally to be leader but he was unable to take part.) Jean Bouvier (supplies); Jean Couzy (specialised equipment including oxygen); Pierre Leroux; Guido Magnone (technical repairs and development) and Lionel Terray (filming) together with Jean Rivolier (doctor) and Pierre Bordet (geologist). In 1955 Serge Coupé and André Vialatte (transport and liaison with Gyalzen Norbu) also took part as climbers and Michel Latreille was a second geologist. André Lapras replaced Rivolier as doctor. (Note: The details of the personnel and camp locations have often here been drawn from the online version of Elizabeth Hawley's Himalayan Database.) (Note: Hawley, Elizabeth. "Himalayan Database: Display Expeditions". www.himalayandatabase.com. Archived from the original on 14 February 2021. search for Exped ID "MAKA-551-01")

Gyalzen Norbu (Note: See Horrell (2014)) was the chief Sherpa (sirdar) and Pasang Phutar the head porter (replaced in 1955 by Kindjock Tsering, on leave from the Brigade of Gurkhas). The nine Sherpas in 1954 were Ang Tsering; Da Norbu; Eila Namgyal; Gyalzen II; Mingma Tsering; Pa Norbu; Pemba Norbu; Pemba Tenzing and Tashi. In 1955 there were 23 Sherpas: Aila; Ang Bao; Ang Phutar; Ang Tsering (cook, known as Panzy); Ang Tsering IV; Chotaree; Chumbee; Da Norbu; Dagang Norjee; Eila Namgyal; Gunden; Gyalzen II; Mingma Tsering I; Mingma Tsering II; Mingma Tenzing; Nim Temba; Nim Tenzing; Pa Norbu; Pasang Dawa; Pemba Norbu; Pemba Tenzing; Tashi and Wongdi.

In 1954 there were 180 porters, mostly men but some women, taking 6.5 tons of baggage to Base Camp and in 1955 this was increased to 315 porters and 11 tons of baggage.

=== Techniques and equipment ===
Franco, the team leader, liaised with Maurice Herzog, leader of the 1950 Annapurna expedition. Acclimatisation issues were discussed with Griffith Pugh of the 1953 Everest expedition and Couzy developed acclimatisation and supplementary oxygen procedures. Magnone dealt with procuring suitable oxygen equipment. The 1952 Swiss Everest team, based on their own experience, advised using the autumn 1954 opportunity to mount a reconnaissance effort, followed in 1955 by a full-scale attempt on the summit.

Open-circuit oxygen equipment was to be used by the climbers above Camp IV and Sherpas above Camp V. An improved type, using a lighter metal alloy and able to hold a higher pressure of oxygen, was shipped out separately once the equipment was ready in January 1955. (Note: The sets held a single cylinder weighing 6.7 kilograms (14.7 lb) and holding 920 litre of oxygen at 230 standard atmospheres (23 MPa; 3,400 psi). 450 cylinders were shipped out.) Unfortunately the new oxygen regulators were often faulty but Magnone was able to improve them and he also enabled an increase in maximum flow by adding a second valve. They took French radio sets for receiving weather forecasts from Calcutta and for communications between camps. These they found light, simple to use and reliable.

=== 1954 reconnaissance ===
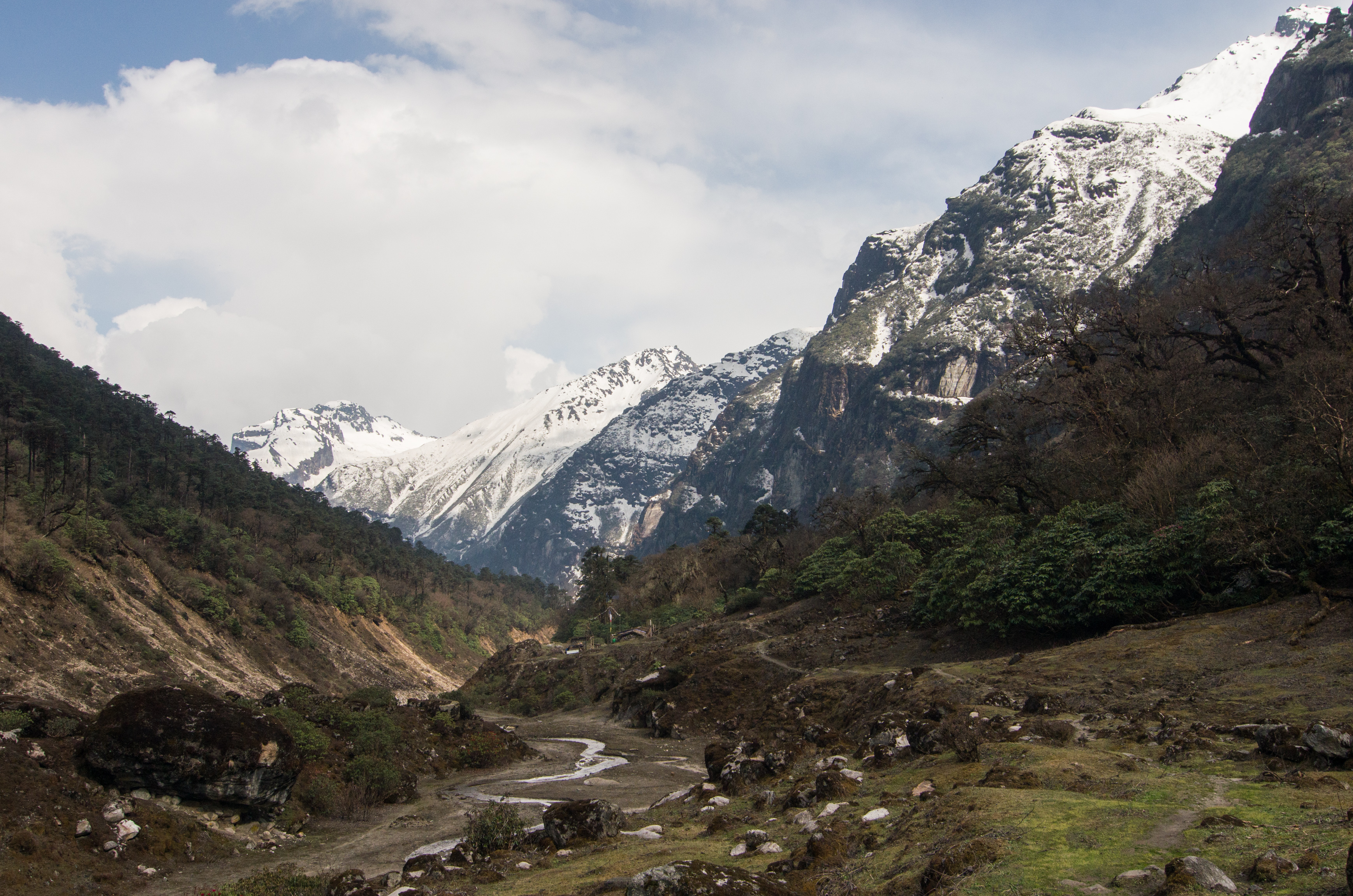
Barun River valley looking towards Makalu

The reconnaissance in 1954 involved finding a suitable approach route up the line of the Arun River and, as well as appointing Sherpas from Sola Khumbu and Darjeeling, they hired local porters in Biratnagar and Sedoa. (Note: Sedoa is now romanised as Seduwa.) This approach was successful and was also used in 1955. Equipment was tested and, in particular, lightweight crampons with long spikes were found to be a good innovation. The Sherpas' feet were found far too short and wide for their boots to fit satisfactorily so they took templates for boots to be specially made for the following year. Unfortunately, the French manufacturers could not believe feet could be this shape and so made them the same as before.

Peaks climbed, 1954
| Camp | Altitude (Note: Hawley, Elizabeth. "Himalayan Database: Display Expeditions". www.himalayandatabase.com. Archived from the original on 14 February 2021. search for Exped ID "MAKA-543-01") | | Date occupied (1954) |
| Camp | metres | feet (Note: Conversion from metres.) | Date occupied (1954) |
|---|---|---|---|
| Base Camp | 4,700 | 15,400 | 15 September |
| Chago | 6,893 (Note: Hawley, Elizabeth. "Himalayan Database: Display Expeditions". www.himalayandatabase.com. Archived from the original on 14 February 2021. search for Exped ID "CHAG-543-01") | 22,615 | 9 October |
| Pethangtse | 6,739 (Note: Hawley, Elizabeth. "Himalayan Database: Display Expeditions". www.himalayandatabase.com. Archived from the original on 14 February 2021. search for Exped ID "PETH-543-01") | 22,110 | 10 October |
| Kangchungtse (Makalu II) | 7,678 (Note: Hawley, Elizabeth. "Himalayan Database: Display Expeditions". www.himalayandatabase.com. Archived from the original on 14 February 2021. search for Exped ID "MAK2-543-01") | 25,190 | 22 October |
| Chomo Lonzo | 7,797 | 25,581 | 30 October |
| High point | 7,800 | 25,600 | 30 October |

They investigated the two most likely routes to the summit – the southeast and northwest ridges – and climbed the neighbouring peaks of Chago, Pethangtse, Kangchungtse and Chomo Lonzo both for acclimatisation and to get a good view of Makalu's topography. This decided an approach up the Makalu Glacier in the west cirque leading to the upper northwest cirque and then a traverse beneath Kangchungtse leading to a steep climb up to the Makalu Col. They made an attempt for the summit along the northwest ridge but did not reach above about 7,800 metres (25,600 ft). To avoid the difficult northwest ridge in 1955 they planned to cross the Col and move onto the north face for the topmost 910 metres (3,000 ft).

It was shown from experience that it was seriously counterproductive to spend more than ten days at Camp III or above.

== 1955 expedition ==
=== Departure from France and march-in ===
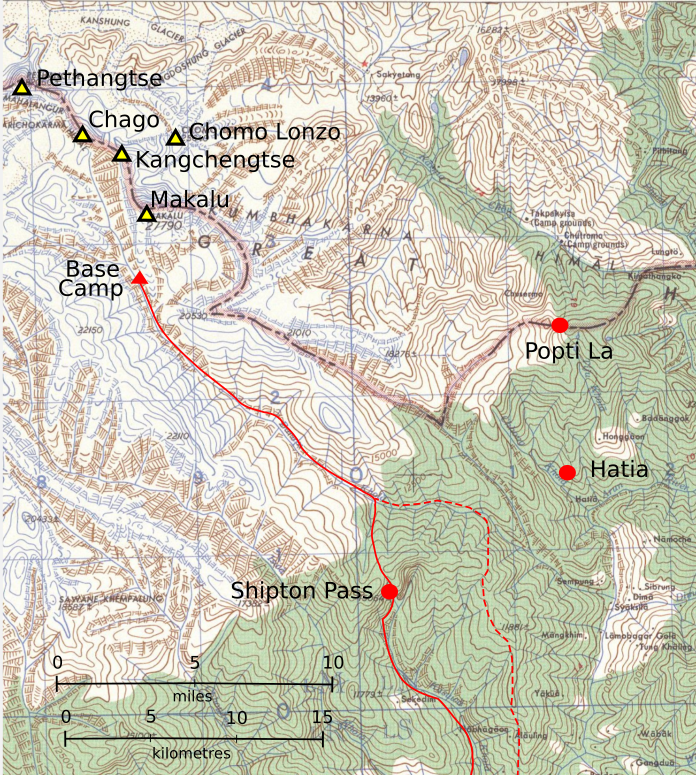

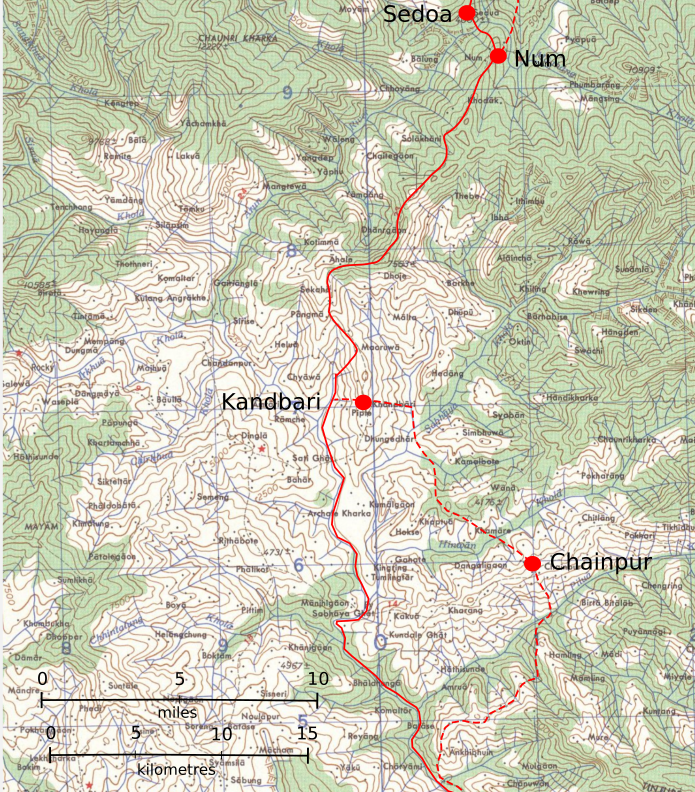

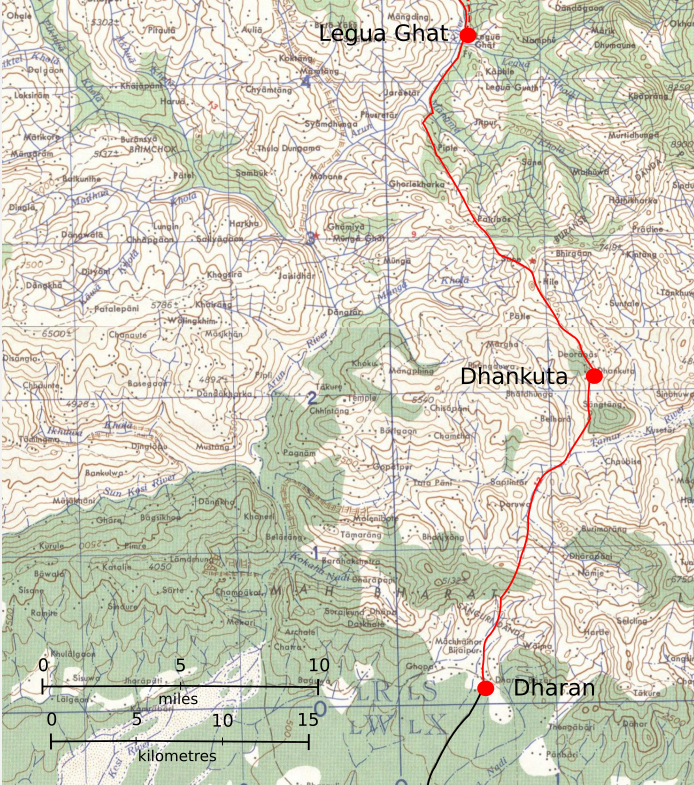

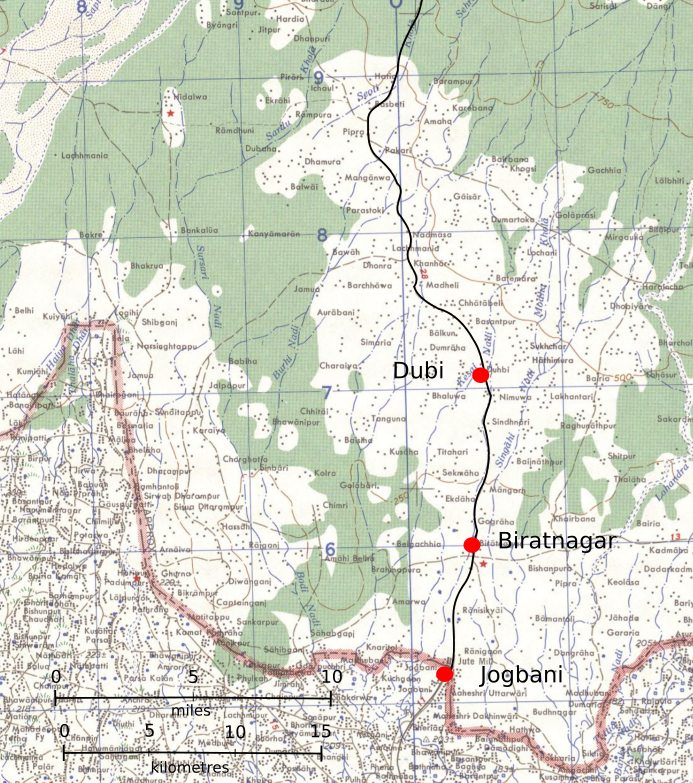

March-in route
(4 images)

The expedition flew from Orly Airport and arrived in Calcutta on 12 March. Most of the equipment had been sent on ahead. However their oxygen sets were mistakenly transported to Rangoon rather than Calcutta so Couzy had to fly out there to sort things out while Coupé waited behind for him in Dharan with a contingent of porters to catch up the main expedition. From Calcutta the party flew to Biratnagar in Nepal where they met their Sherpas from Darjeeling. They had to deal with custom officers when entering Nepal – the previous year there had been no customs formalities. Gyalzen Norbu could not speak French and had difficulty with English but in Nepalese he was very effective in dealing with matters and organising the Sherpas and porters. A very bumpy road led them by lorry to Dharan – in the 1954 monsoon they had taken three days to cover the thirty miles but this time the journey only took a few hours. Here they met the Sherpas hired from Sola Khumbu together with over a hundred porters from there who had trekked for 15 days across Nepal in the hope of being employed.

The student geologists Bordet and Latreille departed on their separate expedition. On 20 March the trek towards Makalu began from Dharan where the Ganges plain starts to rise to become the Himalayan foothills. On the approach march the climbers did not carry loads and Sherpas only started carrying at Base Camp so the porters were left to labour under loads of 23–36 kilograms (50–80 lb). The porters from Sola Khumbu had plaits and wore long coats and multi-coloured boots whereas those from Darjeeling, with greater contact with Western culture, were more smartly dressed but looked less picturesque. The local porters wore loincloths and went barefoot. Panzy, the cook, had been on the French Annapurna expedition but since then he had been cook on several British expeditions and had developed a cuisine that did not suit the French palette.

The route passed through a tropical afforested region to Dhankuta then went via Legua Ghat and on north beside the Arun river. Approaching the village of Num the Arun gorge was so deep the track had to leave the line of the river. (Note: The 1954 detour via Chainpur and Kandbari was not needed in 1955.) At Num their trail had to cross the river on a 61–76-metre (200–250 ft) rope bridge 15 metres (50 ft) above the water – the bridge had been repaired specially for them. Now able to see Makalu, they passed through the last inhabited places of Etane and Sedoa. The little village of Sedoa, set on the side of a mountain at 1,600 metres (5,200 ft) and far from the road north to Tibet, was where the Biratnagar porters were paid off after nine days' march. In turn 100 men from Sedoa were hired for the onward carry. It was here that mountaineering equipment was issued to replace lightweight clothing.

On 30 March the party left Sedoa with additional auxiliary porters to support the Sherpas, chosen from among the most capable of the Sola Khumbu and Darjeeling porters. The trail rose to 4,200 metres (13,800 ft) and, in the wind and snow and with the temperature falling to −10 °C (14 °F) at night, the porters had hardly any clothes and only emergency tarpaulins to cover them at night when they resorted to huddling together in groups of 10 to 15. Two sheep they had been taking with them for food died of cold and fatigue. The previous autumn leeches had been a big difficulty but this year, in colder, dryer conditions, they were much less of a problem.

A runner brought news that Couzy had successfully retrieved the oxygen sets from Rangoon and was following five or six days behind Franco's party. In the event he arrived at base camp only two days after Franco.

=== Base camp ===
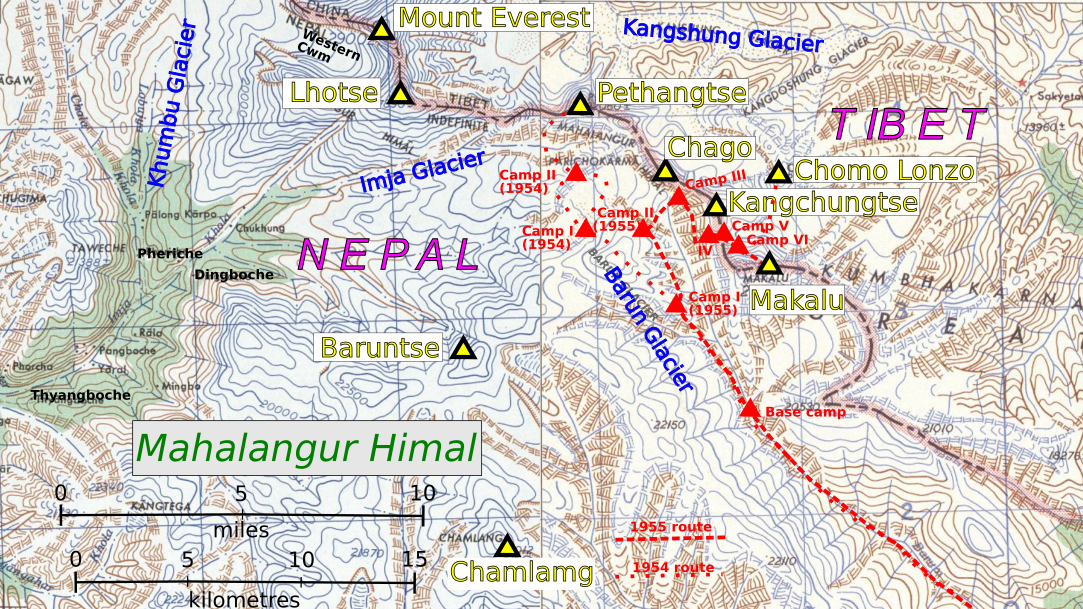
Makalu 1954-1955 French climbing routes

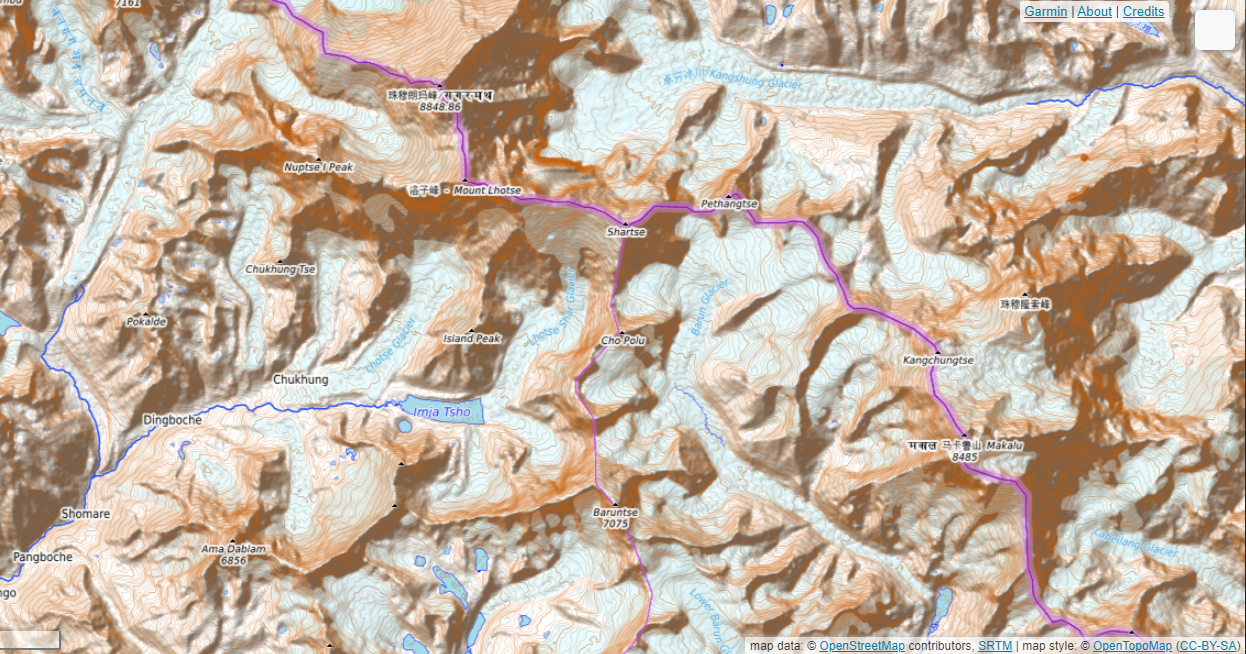
Makalu Everest OpenTopoMap (click for interactive map)

On 4 April Franco and Magnone reached the snout of the Barun glacier where base camp was to be. At the previous year's site, somewhat higher, the water supply had vanished along with the vegetation. The equipment cached last year was still secure. Base Camp was well appointed. Sleeping tents were two-man with triple roofing, and there were communal tents and two very large mess-tents. In all there were thirty separate tents. They constructed a stone shack, which they called the "Makalu Hotel" with fireplace, chimney and a canvas roof. About mid April the geologists rejoined the main party.

Back towards Sedoa there had been deep snow, which had not fallen at base camp and until this cleared they were not able to get additional supplies or post – mail runners took ten days to get from Jogbani to Base Camp, a distance of about 225 miles (362 km).

Packs of food and climbing gear were prepared for going up the mountain. These weighed 25 kilograms (55 lb) for taking to Camp III, 20 kilograms (45 lb) for Camp IV and 16 kilograms (35 lb) for above that. Transporting these supplies involved 20 to 30 people setting off for Camp I each day. On 23 April the expedition as a whole occupied Camp I with only a small group staying at base to return again to Sedoa and make a last carry to Camp I. No one returned to Base Camp until after Makalu had been climbed.

=== Locations of camps ===
| Camp | Altitude | | Date occupied (1955) | Description |
| Camp | metres | feet | Date occupied (1955) | Description |
|---|---|---|---|---|
| Base Camp | 4,900 | 16,100 | 4 April | Beside moraine of lower Barun Glacier |
| Camp I | 5,300 | 17,400 | 23 April | Dip in rocky spur |
| Camp II | 5,800 | 19,000 | 29 April | Platform built on rocky hummock |
| Pethangtse | 6,739 (Note: Hawley, Elizabeth. "Himalayan Database: Display Expeditions". www.himalayandatabase.com. Archived from the original on 14 February 2021. search for Exped ID "PETH-551-01") | 22,110 | 4 May | "A very curious conical peak" |
| Camp III | 6,400 | 21,000 | 7 May | Upper northwest cirque, advanced base camp from 10 May |
| Camp IV | 7,000 | 23,000 | 8 May | Rocky balcony projecting above west cirque |
| Camp V | 7,410 | 24,310 | 9 May | Makalu Col, vast and desolate |
| Camp VI | 7,800 | 25,600 | 14 May | Small terrace on north face |
| Makalu summit | 8,485 | 27,838 | 15–17 May | A "perfect pyramid of snow" with knife-edge ridges |

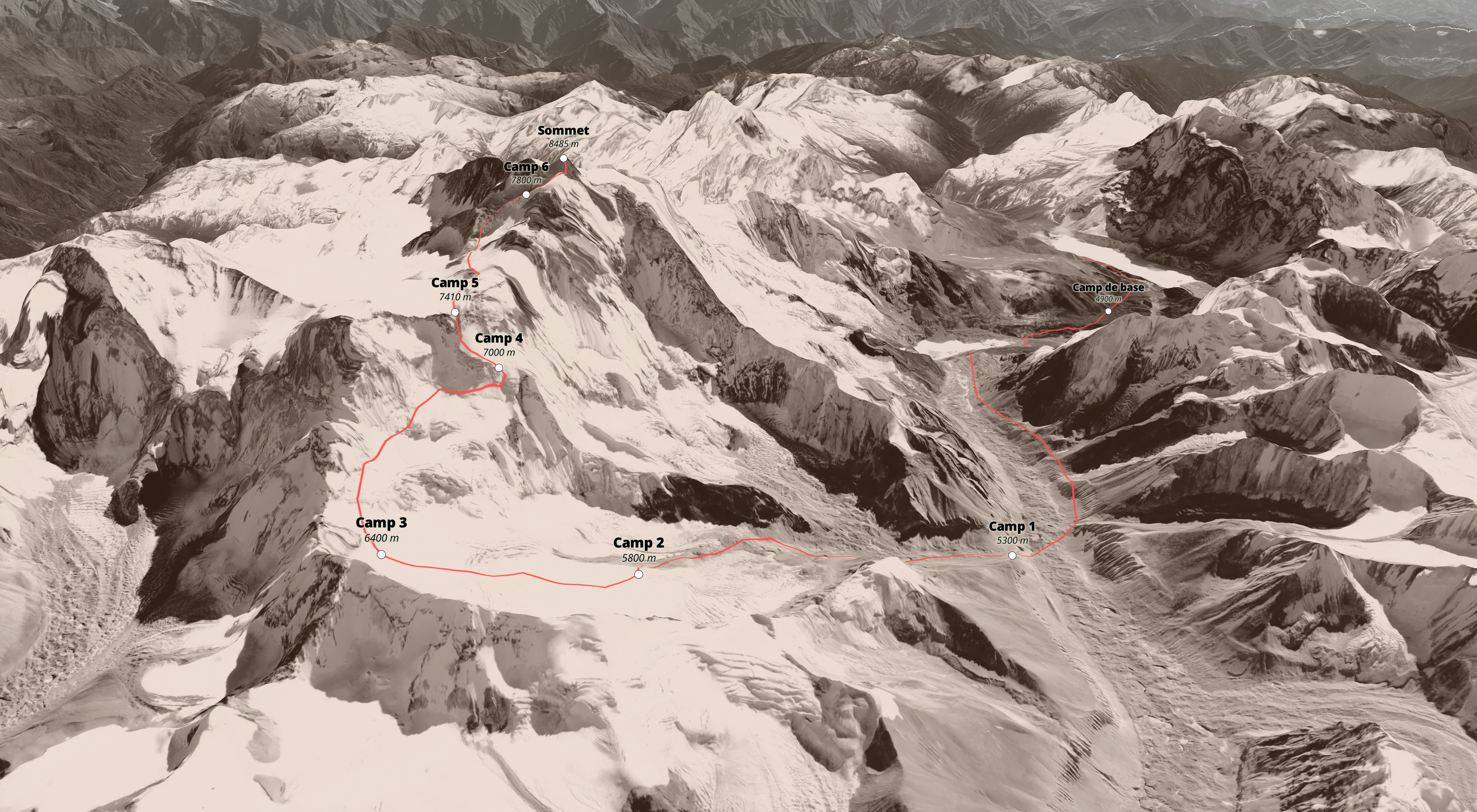
wow

=== Northwest cirque ===
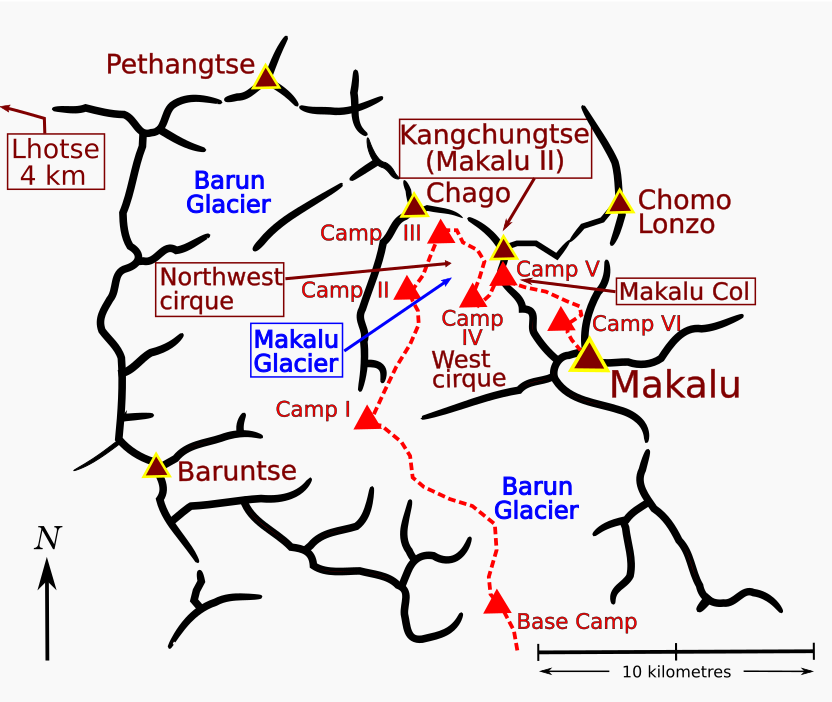
Climbing route on Makalu, 1955

On 23 April Camp I was established in a small dip on a rocky spur at 5,300 metres (17,390 ft) and Camp II, established 29 April, was above a rocky hummock at the entry to the northwest cirque. Acclimatisation training continued during this time and Franco identified Terray and Couzy as likely lead candidates for the summit but he felt happy to have a very strong team around him. The weather was good – sunny and calm in the mornings but windy and cloudy with snow showers in the afternoons. Only once was there a violent storm. They had arranged for radio broadcasts of weather forecasts from Radio Calcutta but nothing materialised until one day they received a forecast along with ones for the Germans concurrently on Dhaulagiri, where the forecast was for severe storms, and for the British Kangchenjunga expedition. Franco's party could see poor weather around them on Everest, Lhotse and Chamlang which encouraged them to hasten their preparations. Latreille and Vialatte took the opportunity of climbing Pethangtse prior to Latreille and Bourdet embarking on further geologising around Sola Khumbu and Namche Bazaar. Supplies were continually being carried by the Sherpas as high as Camp III which was stocked to become Advanced Base Camp. There the tents were set in 0.91 metres (3 ft) deep platforms dug into the glacier and by 10 May the camp held sufficient supplies and equipment for a summit attempt. Cooking could not be done on paraffin stoves at such an altitude and so gas cylinders needed to be used.

The plan from Camp III to Camp V at Makalu Col was as follows. The route upward would be made suitable for Sherpas with heavy loads and eventually over 760 metres (2,500 ft) of fixed rope were set in place. Pairs of climbers each accompanied by a few Sherpas would carry loads up each day and would immediately drop down to Camp III or below to make way for a subsequent team. To be successful this would require reliable radio communications and good weather. Above Camp III the Sherpas were to be given the same high-altitude rations as the French climbers. A single "heavy carry" would be done to establish Camp V on the Col in one large effort with at least 20 Sherpas becoming involved. An immediate descent to as low a camp as possible would be necessary because acclimatisation was impossible at the height of the Col. Bouvier and Leroux had found that on the traverse beyond Camp III what had been an easy snowy terrace in 1954 was now very slippery bare ice.

Camp IV was at a place they called the balcony, high on the back wall of the northwest cirque and between two couloirs, and to reach there high-altitude clothes were used by climbers and Sherpas alike. Fixed ropes were installed for the traverse and steps were cut up the 20-metre (65 ft) wall sloping at about 45° and crossing the bergschrund at about 6,750 metres (22,150 ft). Eventually, after much rope-setting and relaying of stores, Camp V, on Makalu Col, was reached on 8 May and the "heavy carry" to establish this camp took place the next day, all in favourable weather. (Note: The climb up the cliff from Camp IV to the Col took 800 metres (2,600 ft) of fixed rope.) Camp V now held supplies enough for several teams to spend a few days if they were stormbound.

=== Summit attempts ===
From the large and desolate Makalu Col the attempts on the summit were to be across the north face of Makalu because it seemed more straightforward than the direct line up the northwest ridge. They had not ventured on the north face in 1954 but had been able to observe it from Chomo Lonzo and Kangchungtse. It was hoped that only one camp would be needed for the last 910 metres (3,000 ft) of the mountain. On the north side of the mountain a wide glacier slopes gradually down into Tibet from between Kangchungtse, Makalu and Chomo Lonzo before it becomes a series of huge icefalls plunging down to the Kama valley and Kangshung glacier. After a gradual ascent to about 8,100 metres (26,600 ft) the slope gets a lot steeper when a spur leads towards the summit.

From 9 May, Camp V on the Col could be accessed safely by Sherpas in fine weather, even when unaccompanied by climbers. Equipment, including three tents, left behind from 1954 was still available. Given the considerable supplies at Camp III and above, the plan was for separate groups of climbers each to attempt the summit at 24-hour intervals. The first party of Couzy and Terray with five Sherpas in support would pitch Camp VI, send the Sherpas down, and attempt the summit next day. The second party of Franco and Magnone would use Camp VI overnight before trying for the summit or, if the first party had turned back, would pitch a higher Camp VII at 8,000–8,080 metres (26,250–26,500 ft) and attempt the summit the day after. If these attempts failed, a team of Bouvier, Coupé, Leroux and Vialatte would try, succeeded a day later by a second attempt by the first four climbers. The twelve strongest Sherpas would provide support, using oxygen above Camp V whereas the French climbers would use it above Camp IV. (Note: Sherpas in the first group were Aila, Eila Namgyal, Gyalzen II, Ang Phutar and Pemba Norbu. In the second group: Gyalzen Norbu, Da Norbu, Kindjock Tsering, Gunden and Pemba Tenzing. The third group comprised "six of the youngest Sherpas".) Lapras, the doctor, ascended to Camp III and Vialatte was to be temporarily in charge of the expedition until Franco himself returned safely.

Over the next few days progress went very much according to plan. On 11 May, as Franco and his team started their ascent from Camp I, he was surprised to find Gyalzen Norbu going down. He was in Franco's own summit team and yet was descending from Camp II. It turned out Gyalzen Norbu was just going down to Camp I to say goodbye to his wife and would be back up at Camp II by first thing next morning. He was wearing his high-altitude clothes – a padded suit trimmed with fur – so Franco guessed this was to impress his wife.

On 13 May Couzy and Terray reached the Col while Franco and his team gained Camp IV where, unusually, the wind had dropped completely and overnight the temperature had fallen to −26 °C (−14 °F). On 14 May two of the five Sherpas on the Col, who were scheduled to help establish Camp VI, were unfit to go on so the lead climbers went ahead with only three very heavily laden Sherpas in gales that had helped to blow clear loose snow. They successfully pitched a tent at 7,800 metres (25,600 ft) and the Sherpas set off down. The wind had dropped and the snow underfoot was in good condition. When Franco reached Camp V on 14 May he sent the two ill Sherpas down with one of his own Sherpas but soon the three Sherpas descending from Camp VI turned up in an exhausted and distressed state. After they had recovered somewhat it emerged that all three had taken a fall of over 100 metres (330 ft) but the details never became clear. They could not stay at Camp V and Franco felt forced to send them on down to Camp IV for the night. At the end of the day the weather forecast came through predicting fine weather over the whole chain of mountains.

On 15 May 1955, after a night when the temperature had reached −33 °C (−27 °F), the weather was indeed fine and clear as Couzy and Terray reached the summit. It was the most pointed snow summit Couzy had ever seen, "just like a pencil point" and with a knife-edged ridge leading there. When descending they crossed with Franco's team at Camp VI in "a moment of supreme joy". A second tent was pitched at Camp VI and Franco invited Gyalzen Norbu to join with him and Magnone in trying for the summit next day and for Da Norbu to stay at Camp VI to support their return. To help the others next day, that night Da Norbu voluntarily slept without using his oxygen.

For Franco, his summit day went perfectly and on the summit the weather was so calm that he, Magnone and Gyalzen Norbu stayed for a long time. The summit was so sharp all three could only stand on it together when belayed with their ice axes. Only the highest peaks could be seen above a layer of cloud but they could see Chamlang, Kangchenjunga (over 60 miles (100 km) away) and Everest. Franco accidentally let his camera slip and it fell down the south face beyond a line of rocks about 18 metres (60 ft) below. The loss of the camera was not so important but all thirty-five photographs taken on the ascent were gone. To Gyalzen Norbu's horror Franco was let down on a rope held by Magnone to where he managed to retrieve the camera. They had planted French and Nepalese flags on the summit but they took them back down with them to leave the mountain without festoons. Between Camps V and VI they met the third, reserve, party who had climbed all the way up from Camp III in one day using oxygen continuously. They also were to experience the finest climb of their lives when they reached the summit next day.

They all celebrated back at Base Camp by firing their unused distress flares into the air as a violent wind blew monsoon clouds across the sky.

== Assessment ==
The expedition was quickly overshadowed by the British ascent of Kangchenjunga (the third highest mountain) which had been summited on 26 May. Nevertheless, the French and British teams met up in Darjeeling and toasted each others success.

The Makalu expedition marked the first time on an eight-thousand metre mountain that the entire team of climbers had reached the summit. The American Alpine Journal thought Franco deserved high praise for his excellent organisation supported by splendid equipment. R.R.E. Chorley, writing in the Alpine Journal, considered that the reason the expedition had no adventures was because it had been so well conducted. Their luck with the weather was to disguise the importance of good leadership and careful planning. Franco unobtrusively managed seven very individualistic climbers in a way that led to them following a coherent plan and to do so happily. Chorley thought that without supplementary oxygen perhaps only one pair would have reached the summit and so oxygen was a positive asset to the enjoyment of the expedition. Writing presciently in 1956 he continued, "It is an irony of history to think that in fifty years' time the Makalu expedition will have sunk into almost complete oblivion when contrasted with Annapurna".
