= Khartaphu =

Mountain in Tibet

- Kardapu
- Location within Tibet

Highest point
- Elevation: 7,213 m (23,665 ft); Ranked 101st
- Prominence: 712 m (2,336 ft)
- Parent peak: Everest
- Listing: Mountains of China
- Coordinates: 28°03′48″N 86°58′36″E

Geography
- Location: Tibet Autonomous Region, China
- Parent range: Mahalangur, Himalayas

Climbing
- First ascent: 18 July 1935 by a UK team
- Easiest route: snow, ice climb

Khartaphu (also Kardapu) is a mountain in the Himalayas of Asia at the head of the Tibetan Kharta valley. At 7,213 m (23,665 ft) above sea level, it is the 101st highest mountain in the world. The peak is located in Tibet Autonomous Region, China about 7 km (4.3 mi) northeast of Mount Everest.

Khartaphu has a moderately significant subpeak, Khartaphu West, also known as Xiangdong, 28°4′N 86°57′E located approximately 2.6 km (1.6 mi) west of Khartaphu (main) with an elevation of 7,018 m (23,025 ft) and a prominence of 158 m (518 ft).

Khartaphu was first climbed by Eric Shipton, Edwin Kempson and Charles Warren during the 1935 British Mount Everest reconnaissance expedition.
