= Kharta Changri =

Mountain in the Himalayas

- Khartachangri, Kardachangri, Kaerdazhanggeli
- Location within Tibet

Highest point
- Elevation: 7,056 m (23,150 ft)
- Prominence: 426 m (1,398 ft)
- Listing: Mountains of China
- Coordinates: 28°6′51″N 86°59′36″E

Geography
- Location: Tibet
- Parent range: Mahalangur, Himalayas

Climbing
- First ascent: 27 July 1935 (Note: The report in the Alpine Journal of 1936 gives the date of the first ascent as 29 August but the 1995 article in the Alpine Journal by Warren, who was one of the first ascentionists, gives the date as 27 July. The 1935 AJ article also records that Kempson left the party before 23 August so the date given for first ascent in that article must be an error (it may be the date that the photograph of Kharta Changri was taken).)

Kharta Changri is a mountain in the Himalayas which lies at the head of the Kharta valley in Tibet, a few km from the border with Nepal.

== Location ==
The Himalayan peak is located at 7,056 m (23,150 ft) above sea level, 15.6 km north northeast of Mount Everest in the Tingri district of Shigatse, Tibet.

== Climbing history ==
Towards the end of the 1935 British Mount Everest reconnaissance expedition Charles Warren, Edwin Kempson and Michael Spender set out to survey the area east of Everest. On 27 July 1935, whilst Spender was surveying, Kempson and Warren made the first ascent of Kharta Changri.
