= Kangshung Face =

Eastern-facing side of Mount Everest

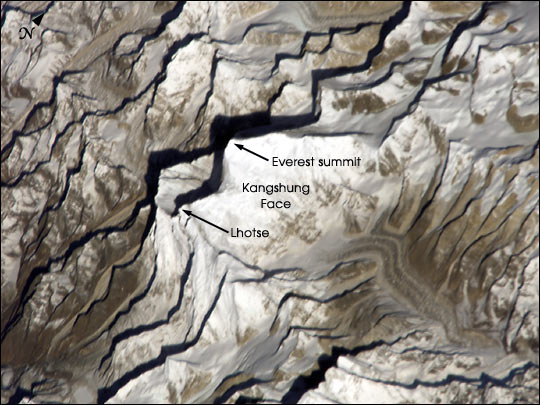
Kangshung Face as seen from orbit

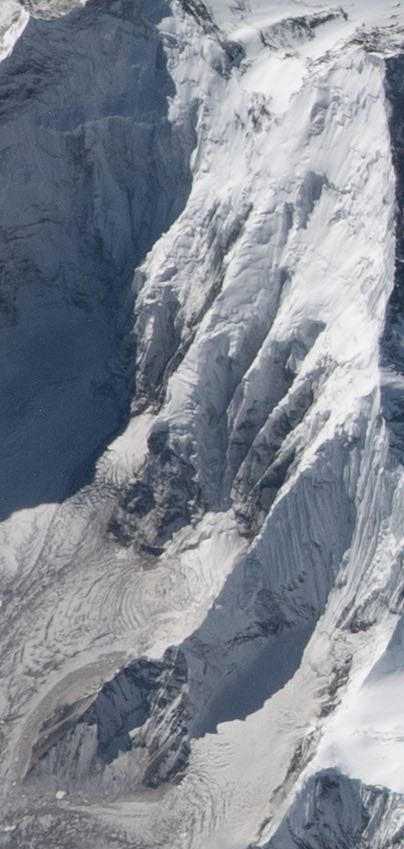
2021 photo of Kangshung Face

The Kangshung Face (Chinese: 康雄壁) or East Face is the eastern-facing side of Mount Everest, one of the Tibetan sides of the mountain. It is 3,350 metres (11,000 ft) from its base on the Kangshung Glacier to the summit. It is a broad face, topped on the right (when seen from below) by the upper Northeast Ridge, and on the left by the Southeast Ridge and the South Col. Most of the upper part of the face is composed of hanging glaciers, while the lower part consists of steep rock buttresses with couloirs between them. The steep southern third of the Kangshung Face also comprises the Northeastern Face of Lhotse; this section may be considered a separate face altogether following the division of the South Everest Buttress up to the South Col. It is considered a dangerous route of ascent, compared to the standard North Col and South Col routes, and it is the most remote face of the mountain, with a longer approach.

== History ==
In 1921, George Mallory and Guy Bullock were the first Westerners to witness and survey the Kangshung Face, as a part of the initial 1921 British reconnaissance expedition which had, for the first time ever, gained permission from the Dalai Lama of Tibet to attempt ascents of Everest.

Mallory and Bullock were led by local yak herders to the east side the mountain, passing through the high Langma La and the rhododendron forests of Kama Chu. At that time of the year in August, there were meadows of flowers and rich vegetation in the valleys and beside the Kangshung Glacier. In 1980, a young American climber, Andy Harvard, undertook a modern reconnaissance of the East Face. Today, there are numerous trekking companies that guide clients to the Kangshung Glacier where they can view Everest. It takes six or seven days to reach the Kangshung Glacier from the nearest road at Yeuba (near Kharta.)

== Climbing history ==
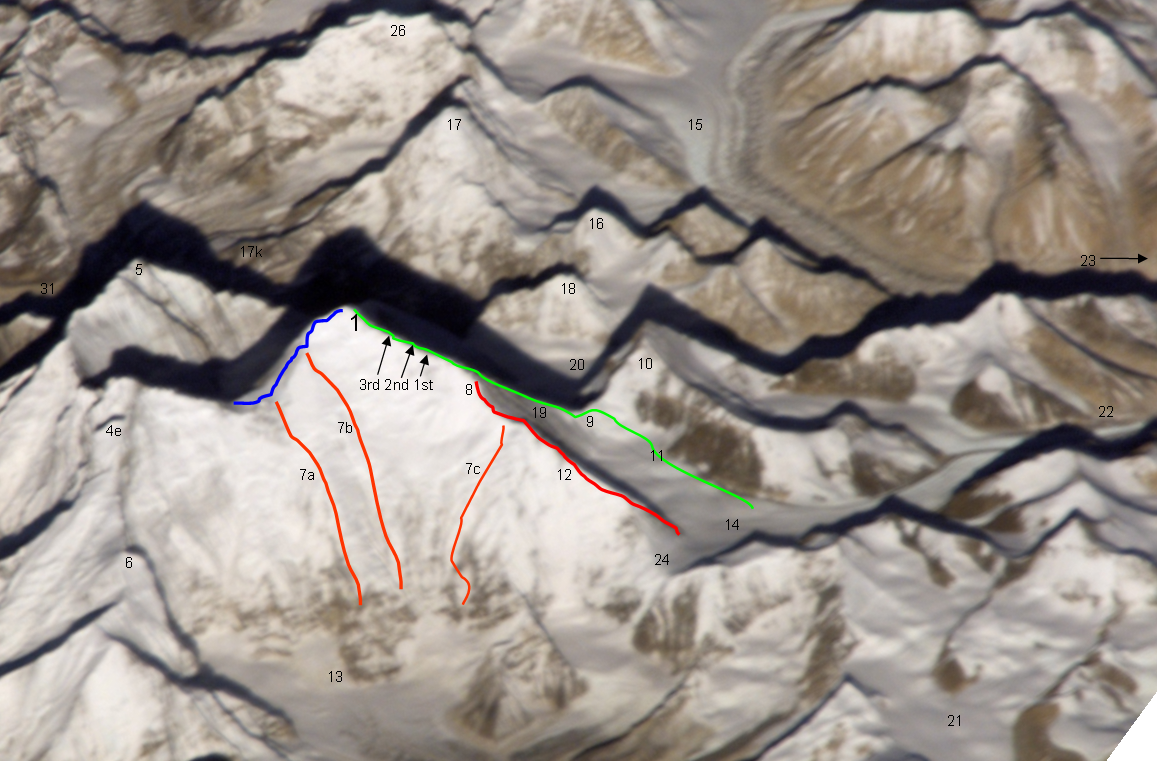
Various climbing routes

A 1981 American attempt led by Richard Blum and Louis Reichardt, including Edmund Hillary, George Lowe, John Roskelley and Kim Momb made progress on the steep rock buttresses, but aborted at around 7000 meters due to high avalanche danger.

The first successful ascent of the Kangshung Face was made in 1983 by an American expedition led by James D. Morrissey. After five and a half weeks of effort, Kim Momb, Carlos Buhler, and Louis Reichardt summited on 8 October 1983. George Lowe, Dan Reid and Jay Cassell summited the next day.

In 1988, an American/British expedition climbed a new route up the South Buttress on the face to reach the South Col, with a finish to the summit via the standard Southeast Ridge; Stephen Venables became the first Briton to summit without the use of bottled oxygen. Ed Webster (USA) and Robert Anderson (USA) made it to the South Summit but did not reach the summit. Paul Teare (Canada) made it to the South Col, but descended because he was feeling unwell. In support were: Miriam Zieman (USA), doctor; Joseph Blackburn (USA), photographer; Pasang Norbu (Nepal), cook and Kasang Tsering (Tibet), cookboy.

In 1992 a Chilean expedition successfully climbed this route being the second expedition to do it. The climbers who reached the summit were Rodrigo Jordan, Cristian Garcia-Huidobro and Juan Sebastian Montes.

Kangshung face is where Lincoln Hall was found alive after he was left for dead on his 2006 expedition to summit Mount Everest.

'I imagine you're surprised to see me here'.

— Lincoln Hall when he was re-discovered sitting on top the Kangshung cliff

== Ascending the Kangshung Face ==
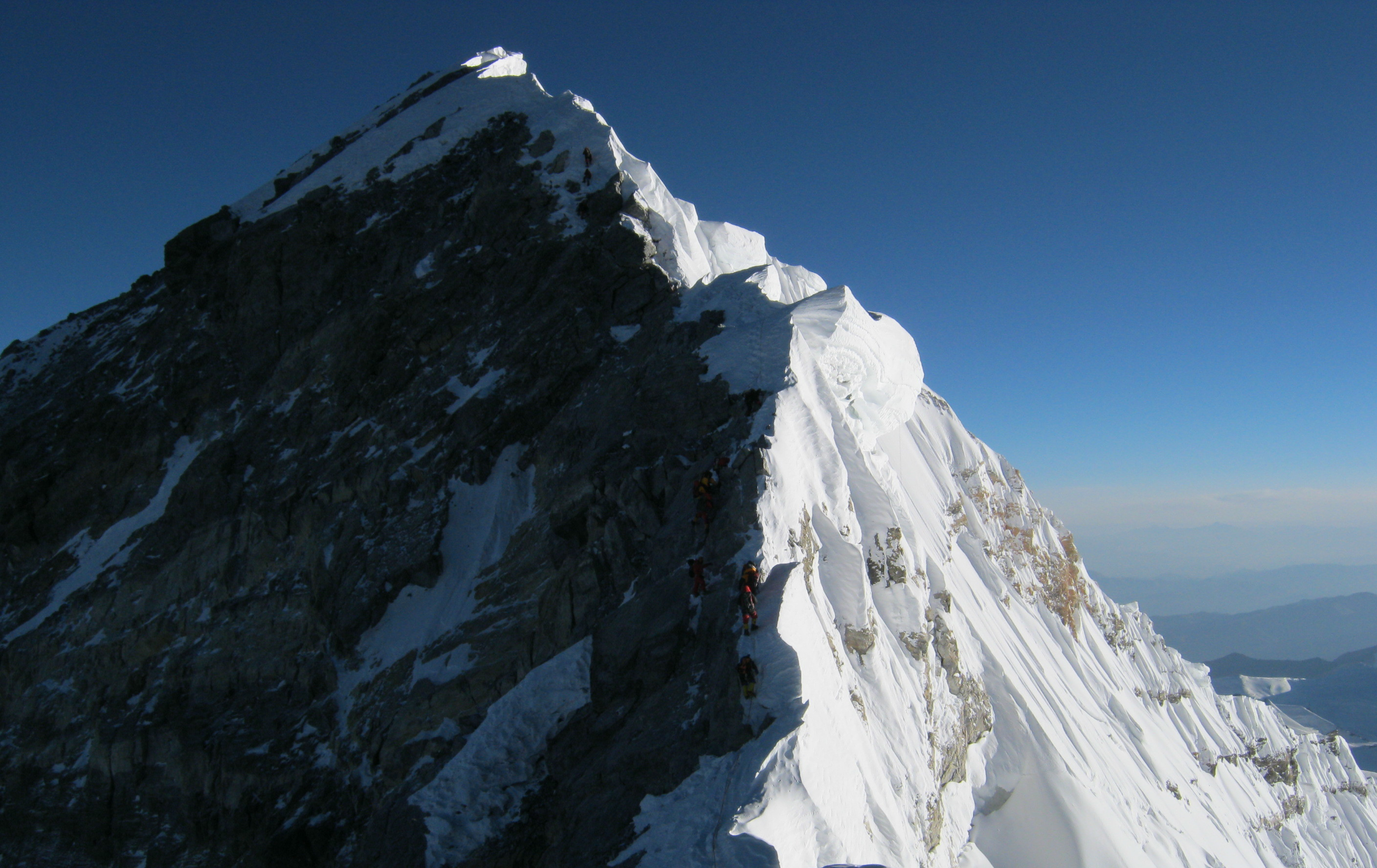
To the right is the top of the east Kangshung face. To the left is the top of the South-West face and the Hillary Step in between along the ridge-line.

To climb the face, the 3 kilometer (2 mi) wide base of the wall must be surpassed by climbing up either the deep gashes of avalanche-swept gullies or the vertical, overhanging rock buttresses, full of deadly ice towers and unsteady snow. Since the crux of the route is near the bottom, retreat is more difficult, making the climb more committing; the relative isolation of the face and probable lack of other climbers also add to the commitment factor. The hanging glaciers and snow slopes pose a large risk of avalanches, especially in the case of a storm, adding to the objective danger of the route. Taking into account these challenges, George Mallory noted in his expedition book: "Other men, less wise, might attempt this way if they would, but, emphatically, it was not for us."
