= Lhagba La =

Mountain pass northeast of Mount Everest

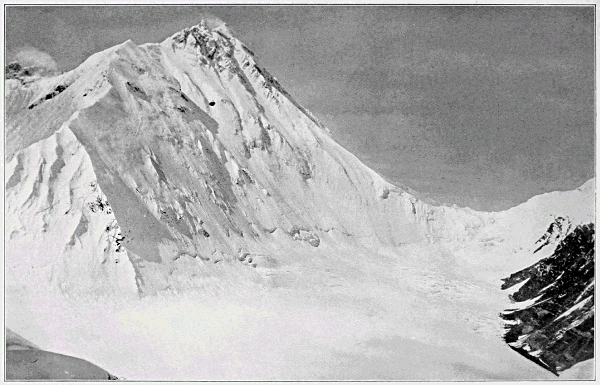
- Everest and North Col as seen from Lhagba La

- Location within Tibet

Third Approach
- Location: northeast of Mount Everest
- Coordinates: 28°02′30″N 86°57′29″E

Lhagba La or Lhakpa La (meaning "Windy Gap") is a 6,849-metre (22,470 ft) col about 7 kilometres (4.3 mi) northeast of Mount Everest in the Tibet Autonomous Region.

It was unknown to local inhabitants until it was discovered and named by the 1921 British Mount Everest reconnaissance expedition when reconnoitring a route to climb the mountain. Lhagba La is the starting point of the Kharta Glacier which descends eastwards along the valley towards Kharta. The Kharta River is a tributary of the Arun River. On the western side of the col is the East Rongbuk Glacier which flows north from Everest. Lhagba Pool, 500 metres (1,600 ft) below and less than 1 kilometre (0.62 mi) southwest, was reportedly the second highest lake in the world, but the lake has likely dried up.

Expeditions attempting Everest via the North Col generally arrive up the East Rongbuk Glacier and so do not reach Lhagba La at all. However, when George Mallory and Guy Bullock were trying to reach the North Col, the route from Rongbuk was unknown to them. Instead they approached from the east only to find the glacier did not extend to the North Col. The climbing team eventually had to cross the pass and descend some 460 metres (1,500 ft) to the East Rongbuk Glacier before ascending to the North Col. Their discovery allowed the 1922 British Mount Everest expedition to take the more direct route from the north.

Sketch map of Everest region

Sketch map of Kharta and environs

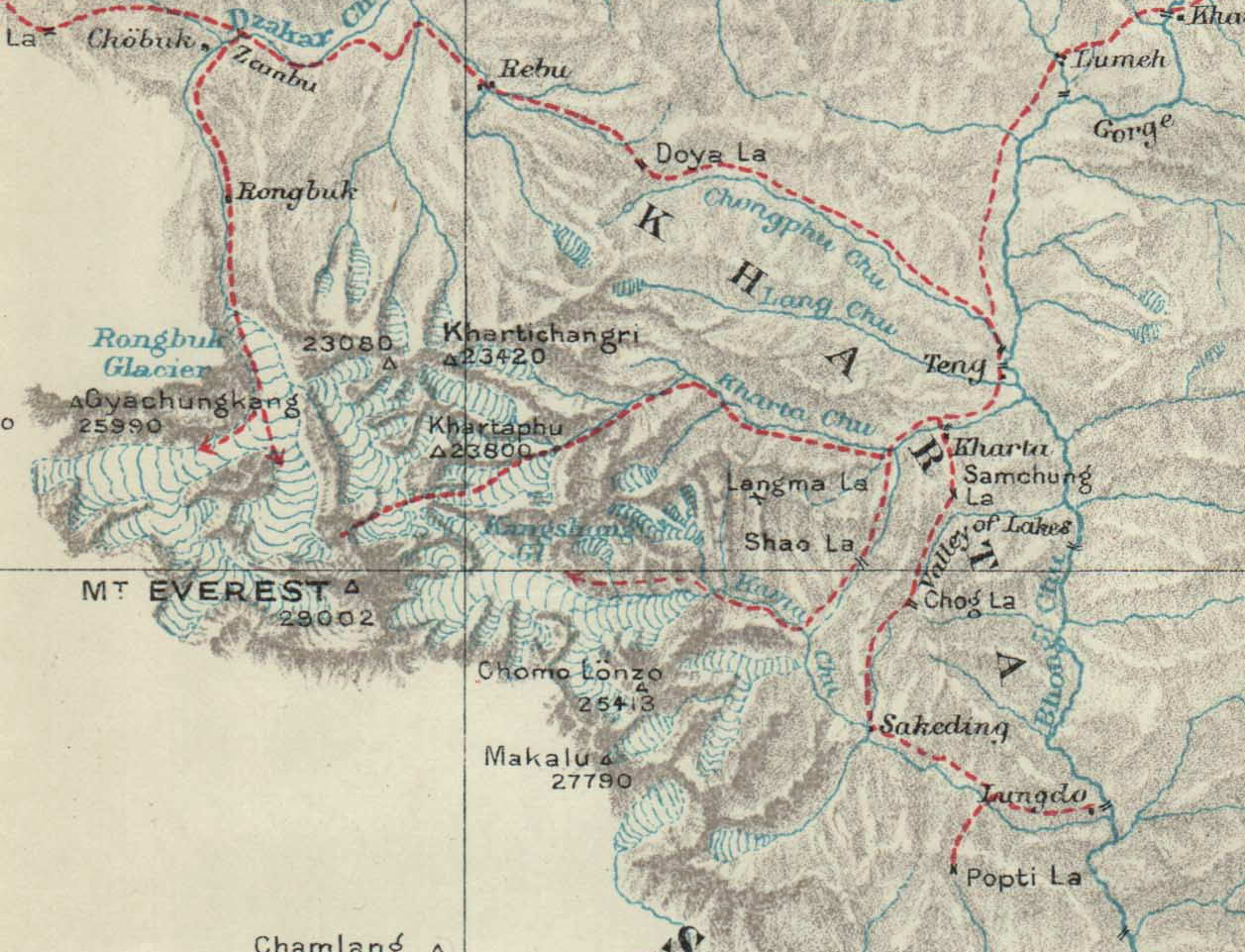
Kharta, Tibet from Morshead's map showing routes taken during the 1921 expedition
