= 1921 British Mount Everest reconnaissance expedition =

First attempt to find a route to climb Mount Everest

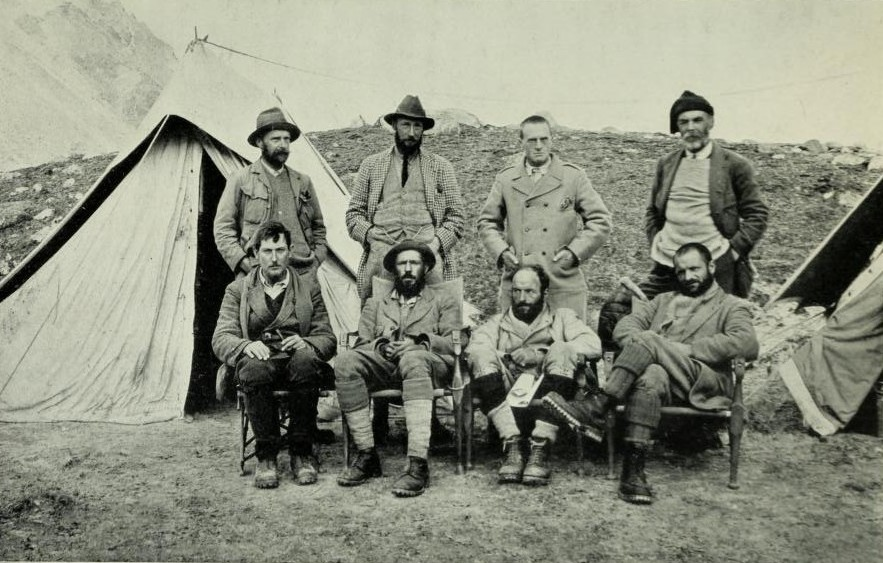
United Kingdom and Canadian participants of the expedition at Kharta Advanced Base Camp, September 1921. Standing (left to right): Wollaston, Howard-Bury, Heron, Raeburn. Sitting (left to right): Mallory, Wheeler, Bullock, Morshead.

Everest Northeast Ridge joined by the Fantasy Ridge (left) and the North Col at the Northeast shoulder (right); photo taken by Wollaston from Kharta Glacier 20,000ft camp.

The 1921 British Mount Everest reconnaissance expedition set off to explore how it might be possible to get to the vicinity of Mount Everest, to reconnoitre possible routes for ascending the mountain, and – if possible – make the first ascent of the highest mountain in the world. At that time Nepal was closed to foreigners, so any approach had to be from the north, through Tibet. A feasible route was discovered from the east up the Kharta Glacier and then crossing the Lhakpa La pass north east of Everest. It was then necessary to descend to the East Rongbuk Glacier before climbing again to Everest's North Col. However, although the North Col was reached, it was not possible to climb further before the expedition had to withdraw.

Initially, the expedition explored from the north and reached the main Rongbuk Glacier, only to find that it seemed to provide no likely routes to the summit. However, at the time it was not realised that the East Rongbuk glacier actually flowed into the Rongbuk glacier via its meltwater stream – it was thought it descended away to the east.

As a reconnaissance the expedition was a success because it determined that a good route might be to approach the East Rongbuk glacier via the Rongbuk glacier, and then follow the North Col route to the summit. In the following year, the 1922 British Mount Everest expedition took this route and was able to climb above the North Col, although it did not reach the summit.

Charles Howard-Bury led the 1921 expedition and George Mallory, who had never before been to Himalaya, was included in the team. As events were to turn out, Mallory became the de facto lead climber. Howard-Bury wrote a book about the expedition, Mount Everest, the Reconnaissance, 1921, to which Mallory contributed six of the chapters.

== Background ==
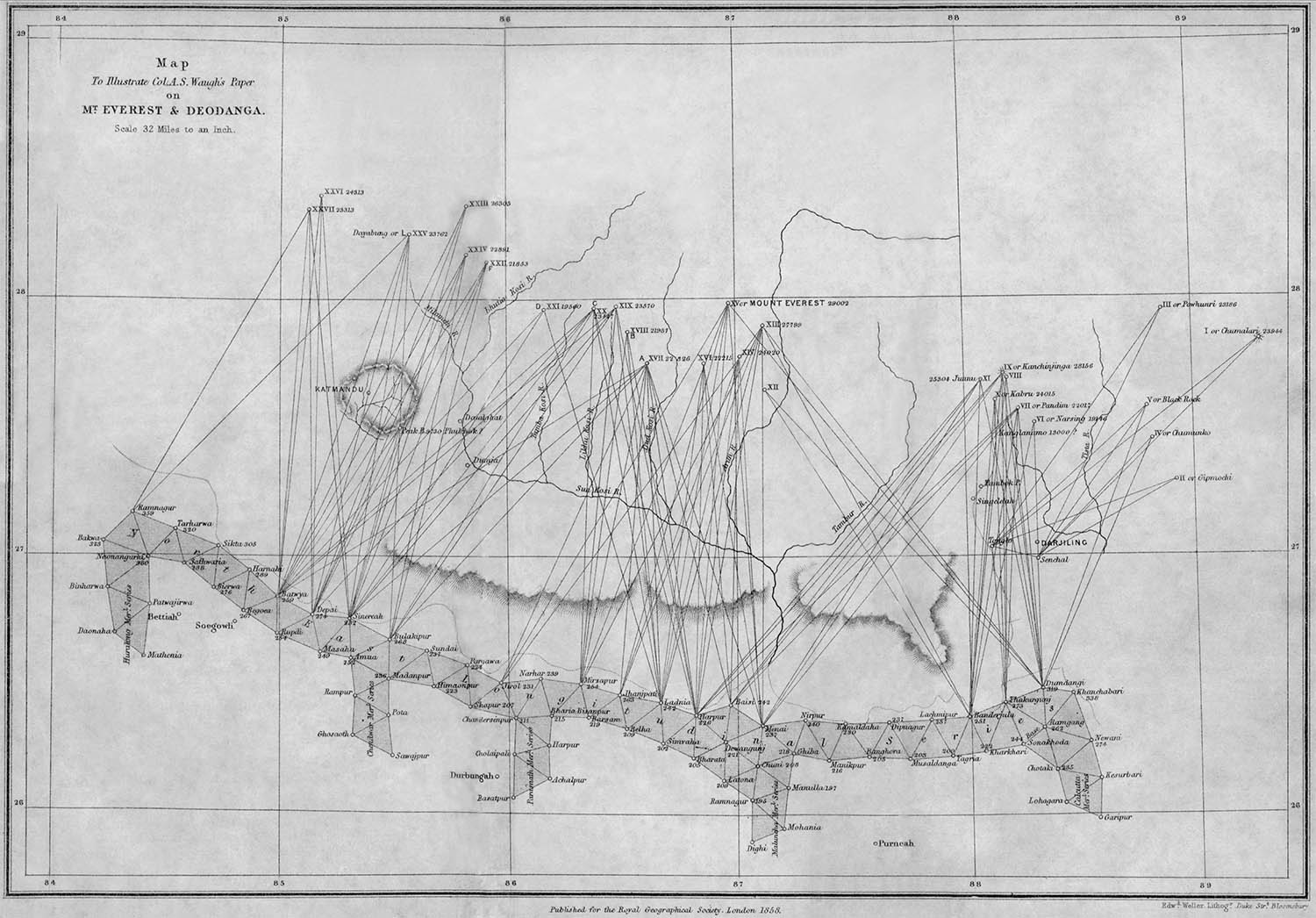
1858 representation of the triangulation of Mount Everest

In 1856 the Great Trigonometric Survey was able to calculate that the highest peak in the world was not Kangchenjunga, but, rather, the somewhat unnoticed Peak XV, which was measured to be 29,002 feet high. (Note: The nearest observation was from a distance of 174 kilometres (108 mi). Modern techniques would have measured the height at that time to be about 29,030 feet.) Mountaineering was in its infancy but antagonism and apathy towards it were waning so, by 1907, to celebrate the fiftieth anniversary of the Alpine Club, a plan was hatched for a British reconnaissance of Everest. General Charles Bruce, who later on became the president of the club, was chosen to lead the expedition. Entry to Tibet, which had historically refused entry to foreigners, became possible due to Sir Francis Younghusband's imperial and exploratory activities, which culminated in his "Mission to Lhasa" and subsequent 1904 Treaty of Lhasa. Initially, the British Secretary of State for India, Lord Morley, refused permission for an expedition out of "consideration of high Imperial policy". This political delay and World War I, in John Buchan's words, "put an end to these pleasant fancies".

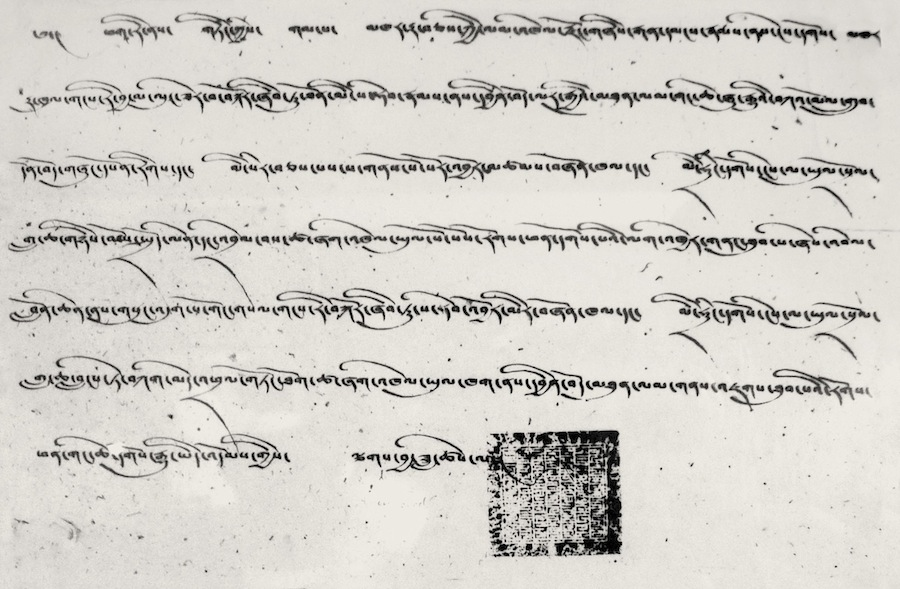
Tibetan visa issued to the expedition (Note: Translation at s:Tibetan passport issued to 1921 British Mount Everest reconnaissance expedition.)

By 1920 the Secretary of State had given approval for an expedition so Colonel Charles Howard-Bury was sent on a diplomatic mission which persuaded the Viceroy of India, Lord Reading, to support that idea. Because Nepal was closed to entry at the time, the expedition's planned approach march would be through Sikkim. The viceroy's agent there, Sir Charles Bell, had been working in Lhasa and he had formed a good relationship with the Dalai Lama, who granted an entry pass for the expedition.

In January 1921 the Alpine Club and the Royal Geographical Society (of which Younghusband was now President) jointly set up the Mount Everest Committee to co-ordinate and fund the expedition. Although they initially supported an all-out attempt at the summit, members of the committee eventually agreed that the primary purpose of the mission should be reconnaissance.

== The expedition team and the march in ==
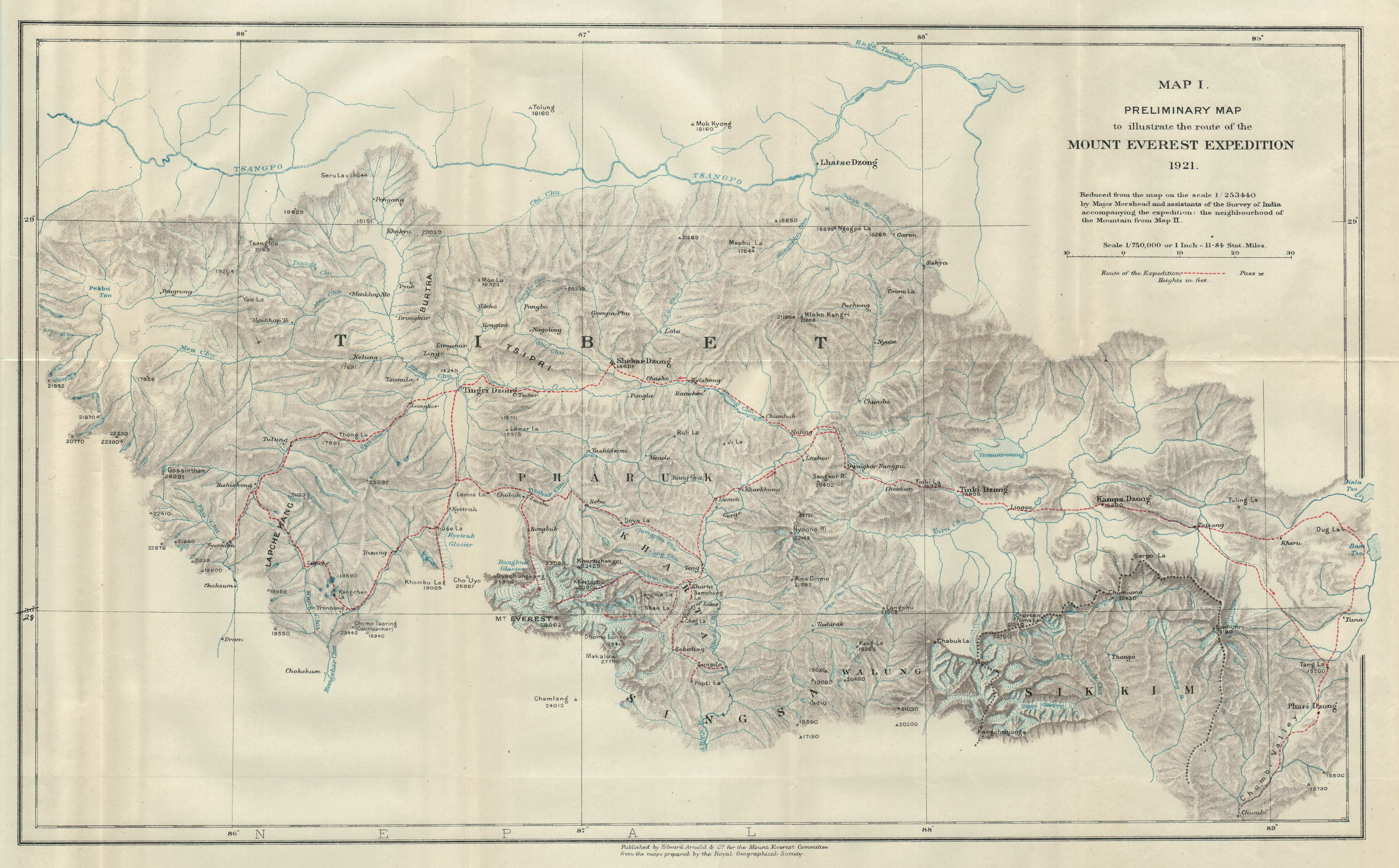
Morshead's map showing routes taken during the expedition

Bruce's military duties prevented him from participating so Howard-Bury was chosen as leader. It was a reconnaissance expedition and at the time 60 miles (97 km) was the closest any Western explorer had been to the mountain. The expedition set off in April 1921 – the climbing team consisted of two experienced mountaineers, Harold Raeburn and Alexander Kellas, and two younger men, George Mallory and Guy Bullock, both Old Wykehamists without any Himalayan experience. The expedition team also included Sandy Wollaston, a naturalist and doctor and Alexander Heron, a geologist. Henry Morshead (also an Old Wykehamist) and Oliver Wheeler were surveyors seconded from the army. When George Bernard Shaw saw a photograph (above) of them wearing Norfolk jackets, knickerbockers, puttees and tweeds he quipped that they "looked like a Connemara picnic trapped in a snowstorm".

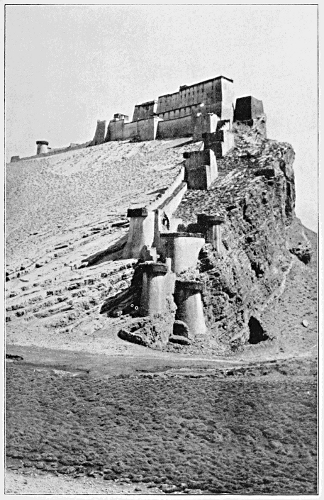
Kampa Dzong (expedition photo)

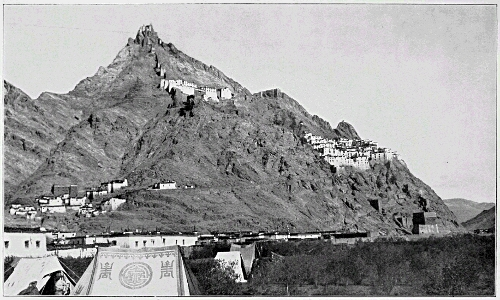
Shekar Dzong (expedition photo)

The expedition, having gathered Sherpas, Bhutias, porters, supplies and 100 Army mules (which later had to be replaced with hill mules and yaks), set off from Darjeeling in British India on 18 May 1921 for the 300-mile (480 km) march to Everest. During their march, the climate changed from hot and humid with verdant growth and heavy, frequent rain, to cold, dry and very windy. The route took them through Sikkim – northeast through Tista valley, over the Jelep La (Note: La is Tibetan for "pass" or "col".) into Tibet and on into the Chumbi Valley, passing Phari at 4,400 metres (14,300 ft), crossing the Himalaya watershed at Tang La and continuing to the Tibetan plateau. Then, leaving the Lhasa road and taking a westward course, the expedition reached Khamba Dzong. Here, on 6 June, Kellas died suddenly of heart failure and Raeburn became sick and had to return to Sikkim. The party followed the valley of the Arun River to the west and at Shiling were first able to see Everest well enough to begin to gauge its topography. Travelling on through Shekar Dzong (Note: Shekar, or Shelkar.) (Note: Dzong is Tibetan for "fort".) they reached Tingri Dzong which became the base for the northern phase of their explorations. By that time, Mallory and Howard-Bury had taken a dislike to each other, with Mallory writing that Howard-Bury was "too much the landlord with not only Tory prejudices, but a highly developed sense of hate and contempt for other sorts of people than his own."

== Northern reconnaissance ==
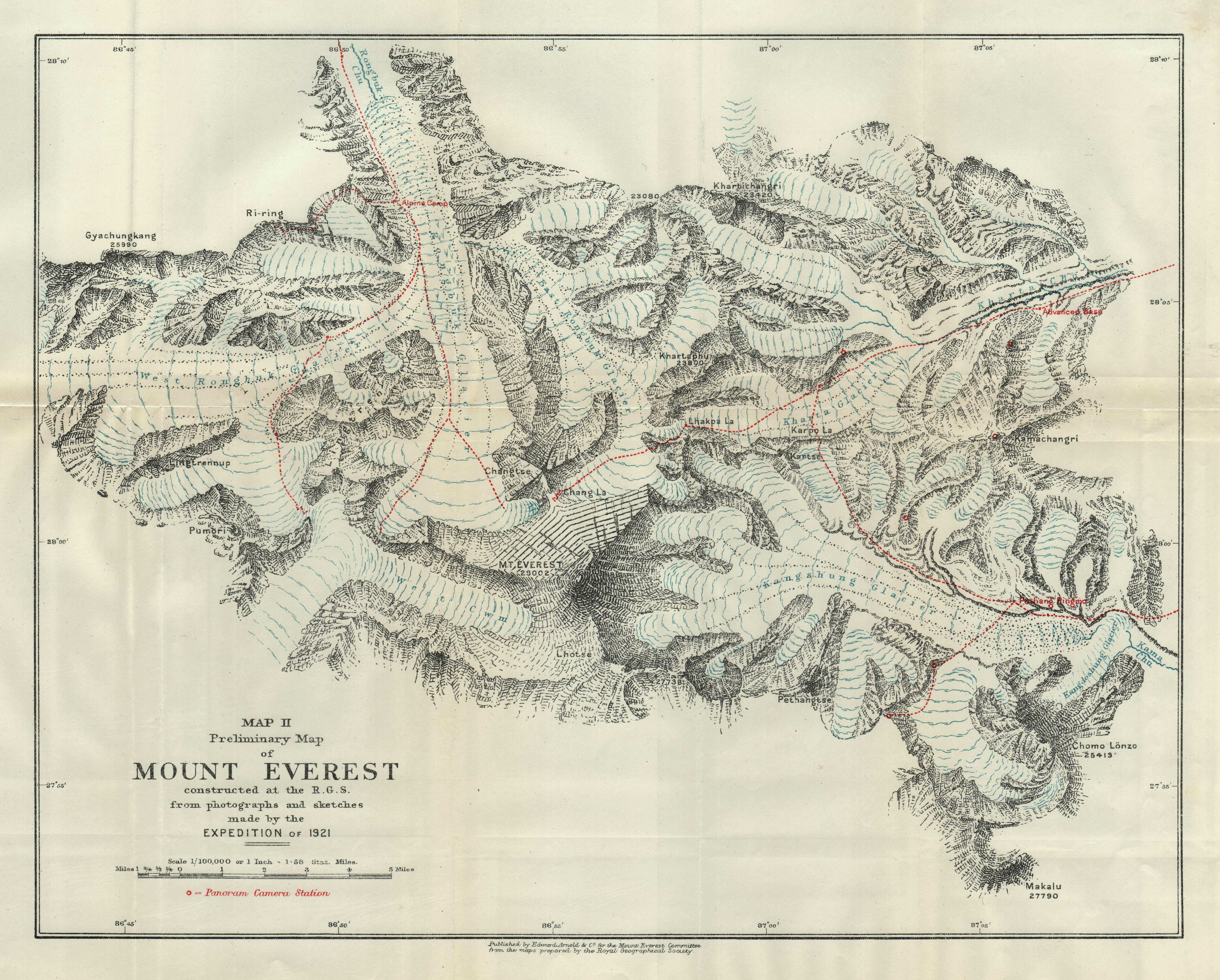
Topographic map, based on Wheeler's surveys

From Tingri, several valleys could be followed south towards Everest and on 23 June Mallory and Bullock started off to the south with sixteen Sherpas and porters. Two days later, at Chobuk they reached the foot of the Rongbuk valley and were then able to see Everest. Ten miles further was the snout of the Rongbuk Glacier (Note: Rongbuk, or Rongpu.) near where they pitched base camp at 5,000 metres (16,500 ft), just beyond the Rongbuk Monastery (Mallory called it "Chöyling"). Only familiar with Alpine glaciers, they had difficulty negotiating 15-metre (50 ft) seracs and retired back at 5,600 metres (18,500 ft) where the West Rongbuk Glacier debouches.

=== Rongbuk Glacier ===
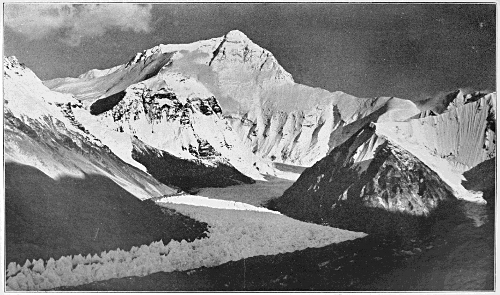
Everest North face, partially obscured by Changtse, seen from near the terminus of the Rongbuk glacier. Photograph taken by Mallory.

Taking six days to acclimatise and recuperate they established Camp II at 5,300 metres (17,500 ft). On 1 July Mallory with five Sherpas went towards the head of the glacier near the North Face of Everest and at 5,800 metres (19,100 ft) he was able to evaluate the western side of the North Col. (Note: The North Col was and is frequently called, Chang La, chang being Tibetan for "north". Now sometimes called Bei'ao) There seemed to be no satisfactory way to reach the North Col but above the col, and towards the summit, there seemed to be a feasible route. Everest's west ridge also did not seem encouraging from this location so Mallory decided the West Rongbuk glacier should be explored.

=== West Rongbuk Glacier ===
Sketch map of region north of Mount Everest

The topography to the west is very complex so on 5 July Mallory and Bullock climbed the 6,900-metre (22,500 ft) Ri Ring (Note: A footnote to Bullock's diary says it was called "Mary" by Mallory and Bullock but this was later disallowed and that W. H. Murray called it "Ri-Ring". However, Davis says Mallory wanted to call it "Mount Kellas" and states its "true elevation" as 22,520 feet (6,860 m) – the second highest mountain climbed at that time. The 1988 National Geographic map marks an unnamed peak at 28.0901°N 86.8154°E, 6,975 metres (22,884 ft) and this has the same location and topographical setting as the "Ri Ring" marked on Morshead's 1921 expedition map. About 2.5 km NE of here the National Geographic map (and Google Maps) marks "Shuguang Peak" at 28.1090°N 86.8300°E, 6,622 metres (21,726 ft) and other lists give "Hongxing Ri" at this location while saying it is also called "Ri Ring".) to get a better perspective. They were able to examine the upper North Face and the north ridge above the North Col and considered the latter was manageable. However, they formed a wrong impression that a high ridge ran from Everest's North Peak (Note: The expedition also called North Peak Changtse – now sometimes Bei Peak) stretching away east to the Arun river. They therefore thought that any approach to the eastern side of the North Col could not be from Rongbuk, never imagining that the glacier on the other side of the North Col would turn back into the main Rongbuk glacier. In fact, where it joins, just above the Rongbuk Monastery, only a small stream is to be seen. Looking more to the west, two routes to Everest looked promising, one over the Lho La at the head of the Rongbuk glacier and one over an unnamed col between Pumori and Lingtren – the hope was that a valley to the south of these cols might provide a good route to the summit. Mallory climbed a peak he called the "Island Peak" (Lingtrennup (Note: Lingtrennup (also known as Xi Lingchain) is at the divide of the West Rongbuk and Pumori glaciers. It is not to be confused with Imja Tse due south of Lhotse which was named "Island peak" by Eric Shipton in 1951.)) from where he attempted to photograph Changtse, Everest and Lhotse, which was just visible. They eventually reached the unnamed col by going west up what is now known as the Pumori Glacier and so by 19 July were able to look down into the Western Cwm and the Khumbu Glacier. They were not able to see the South Col but they thought the Khumbu glacier looked "terribly steep and broken" and anyway the 460-metre (1,500 ft) drop from their col to the glacier was a "hopeless precipice". Any approach through the Western Cwm would therefore have to be from Nepal and by a different expedition.

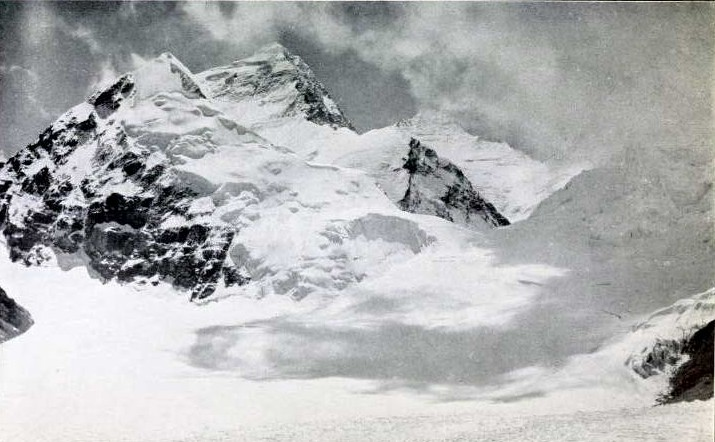
From l-r, Lingtren, the upper north face of Everest, Lhotse behind Everest's west shoulder, and Pumori's eastern ridge. In the foreground, Pumori glacier joins the West Rongbuk glacier. Photograph taken by Mallory near Lingtrennup.

Camps were struck on 20 July with no route having been selected but there remained the possibility of reaching the North Col from the east. Before heading that way, Mallory and Bullock started to investigate the place where, unknown to them, the East Rongbuk glacier debouches. They had to curtail their exploration here because bad news came that the photographs Mallory had taken were all useless because he had been putting the photographic plates in back to front. Photographs were vital as part of the reconnaissance so for two days Mallory and Bullock raced around retaking as many as possible. On this occasion Mallory re-took his photographs from "Island Peak" and Bullock actually reached the Lho La and was able to photograph the Khumbu Icefall. On 25 July they rejoined Howard-Bury's party at Chobuk.

=== Morshead and Wheeler's surveys and other work ===
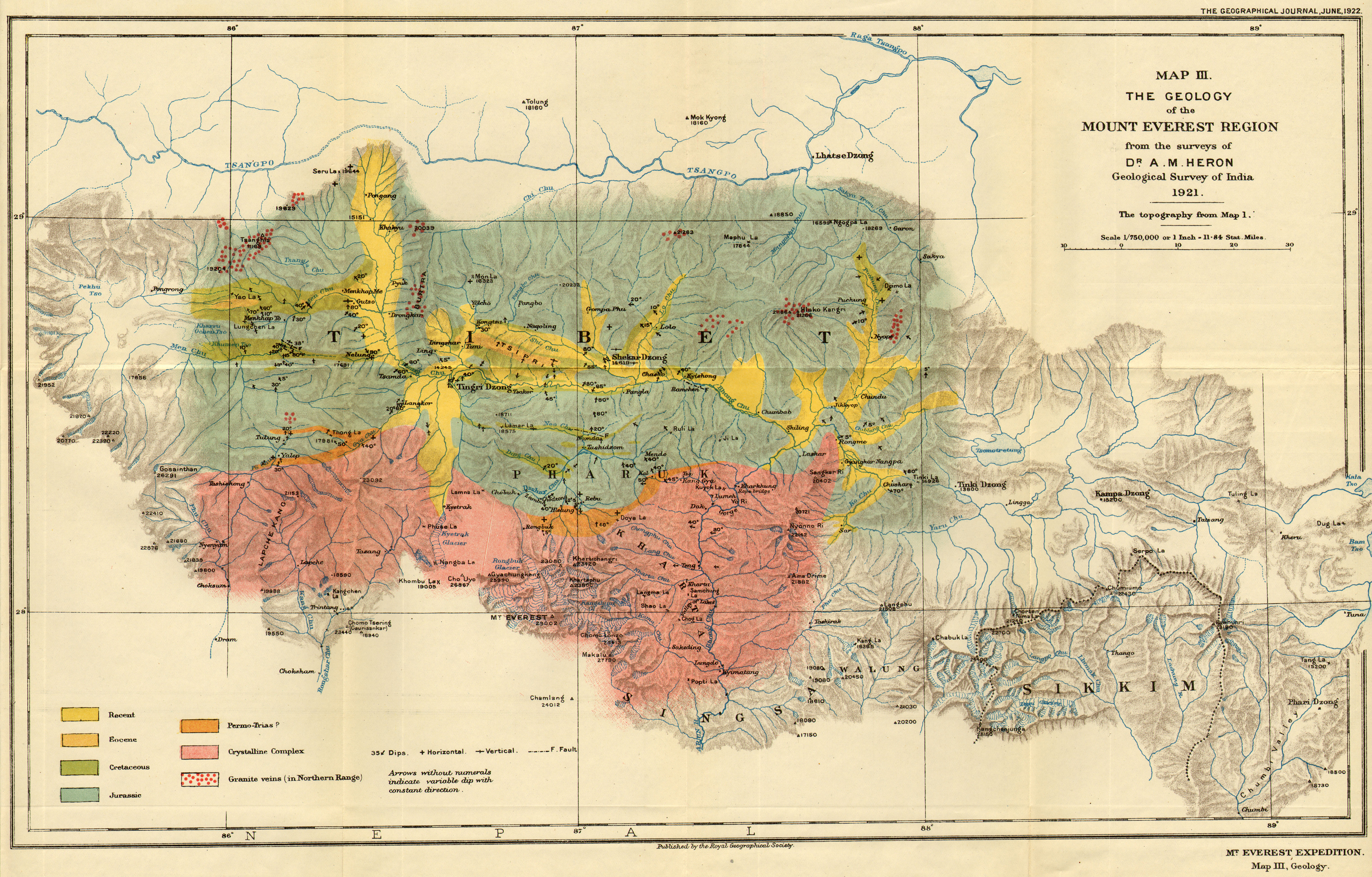
Heron's geological map of Everest region

From the Survey of India, Morshead and Wheeler, with the assistance of Indian surveyors Lalbir Singh Thapa, Gujjar Singh, and Turubaz Khan, produced the first accurate maps of the Everest region. They surveyed 31,000 square kilometres (12,000 sq mi) of difficult unknown territory producing a map of four miles to an inch (1:250,000) and updating the map of Sikkim. Using photo-topographical surveying instruments, Major Wheeler single-handedly completed a methodical and detailed 1,600 square kilometres (600 sq mi) photographic survey of the environs of Everest itself producing a one-inch (1:63360) map. Expedition naturalist and medical officer Wollaston had collected and identified plants, birds and mammals, including new specimens, and Heron had made geological investigations over 21,000 square kilometres (8,000 sq mi) and produced a geological map. Reports of these activities appeared in Howard-Bury's book along with a description of the scientific equipment and cameras that were used. Wheeler, Heron and Howard-Bury reached Nangpa La west of Everest and on the Nepalese border. Morshead and Wollaston crossed the border further west at Lapche, south of Lapche La (Labuche La), and got as far west as Nyenyam. The geographical and geological surveying reached as far north as the Tsangpo river.

Howard-Bury had been exploring to the east to find a location for a future base camp. Unable to cross a tributary of the Arun, he had come to the district of Kharta (Note: Kharta, or Karda.) where no one knew anything about where their local river came from. Since it was glacial, Howard-Bury presumed it came from Everest and so would be a good place for an eastern base camp, if one was to be necessary. Howard-Bury then returned west for further exploration and to organise the removal of the whole expedition to Kharta on 29 July.

== Eastern reconnaissance ==
=== Kharta valley to Kama valley ===
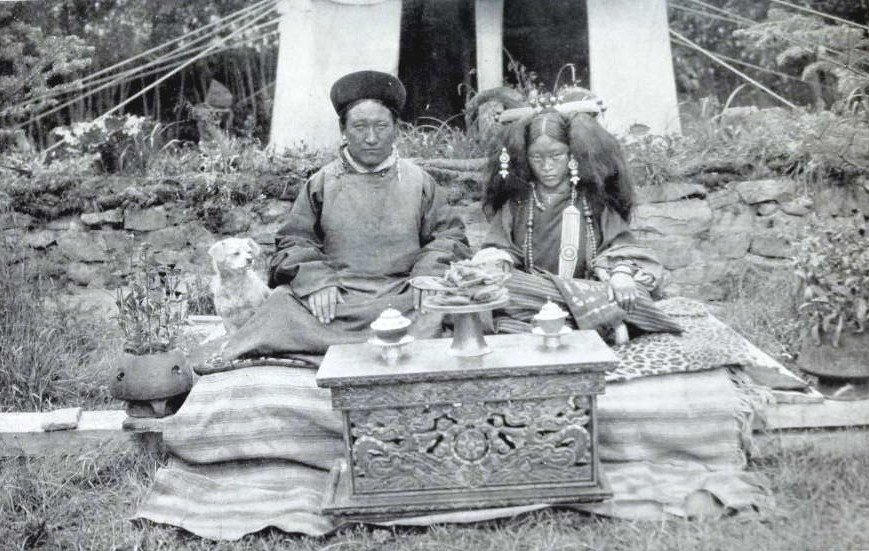
Dzongpen of Kharta and his wife (Note: Howard-Bury, who probably took the photograph, wrote "After we had finished this meal, I induced the Jongpen and his young wife to be photographed. She had a most elaborate head-dress of coral and pearls, with masses of false hair on either side of her head. It was not becoming.")

Suspecting the river at Kharta flowed from the North Col, Mallory and Bullock set off upstream on 2 August. The next day local inhabitants told them a different river flowed from Chomolungma. (Note: Tibetan name for Everest) So they crossed a 5,500 metres (18,000 ft) pass to reach the valley of the Kama River which runs parallel but to the south. They were now very close to Makalu which was further south again. Ahead of them to the west they could see Lhotse and Everest as they approached the Kangshung Glacier (Note: Kangshung, or Kangxung.) and the Kangshung Face. Surrounded by three of the highest peaks in the world Mallory wrote of the Kama valley, "For me the most magnificent and sublime mountain scenery can be made lovelier by some more tender touch; and that too is added here". They regarded scaling the Kangshung Face as impossible, with Mallory noting, "Other men, less wise, might attempt this way if they would, but, emphatically, it was not for us." (Note: The Kangshung Face was not climbed until 1983.)

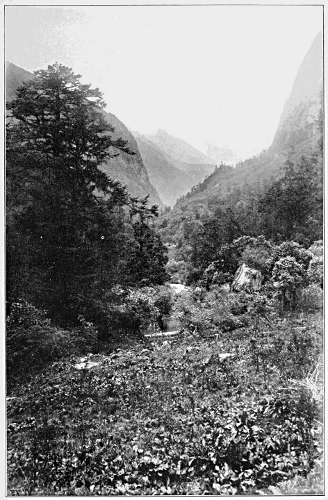
Kama valley. Photograph taken by Wollaston.

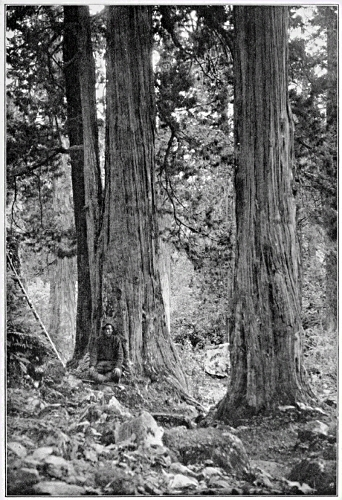
Junipers in Kama valley. Photograph taken by Wollaston.

They realised that they would have to return to the Kharta valley and to achieve this they climbed the 6,520-metre (21,390 ft) Khartse on 7 August so they could examine the North Col as well as the Kangshung Face. They wondered if the glacier in the valley to the north was the one that came down from the North Col or whether that glacier was further north again. Everest's northeast ridge they judged very difficult. (Note: The northeast ridge was first climbed in 1995.) The North Col and the north ridge above it were the only possibility left. They descended Khartse to Kama and returned to the Kharta valley.

=== Return to Kharta valley ===
Mallory was taken ill and so it was left to Bullock to head on west to the head of the Kharta glacier on 13 August. However, a runner came back very soon to tell Mallory that Bullock had observed that the glacier ended in a high pass ahead. He would explore further but it was looking as if the glacier from the North Col did not flow east. Bullock returned and Howard-Bury received a letter from Wheeler showing the results of his survey – the glacier flowing down the east side of the North Col turned sharply north and joined the main Rongbuk Glacier. Time was too short to return to Rongbuk, which now seemed clearly the best way to the North Col, so they decided the best thing to do was to prospect a route to the pass Bullock had seen, which they called Lhakpa La (Note: Lhakpa La, or Lhagba La.) ("Windy Gap") to see whether the North Col could be reached in this way. The weather was bad and the glacier was treacherous but eventually they reached the 6,800-metre (22,200 ft) Lhakpa La on 18 August. Mallory decided the route was feasible and so it was agreed the reconnaissance could be concluded. They returned to base camp for ten days' rest.

Illustrations based on Mallory's sketches of the region east of the North Col

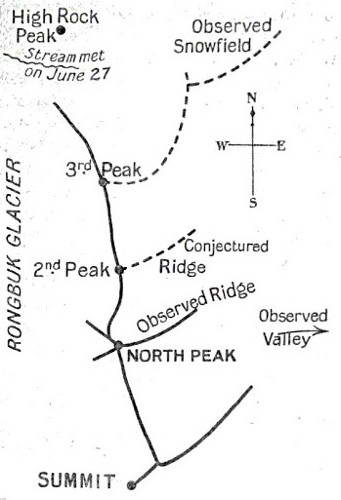
Diagram based on Mallory's original sketch (about 22 July 1921)

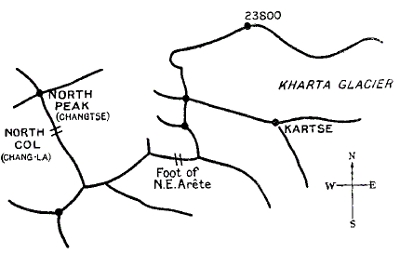
Diagram based on Mallory's revised sketch (about 12 August 1921) The glacier originating between Everest and the North Peak does not flow east down the "Observed Valley". Instead it turns north and then west to emerge at the "Stream met on June 27" and to join the Rongbuk Glacier as it flows north.

== North Col ==
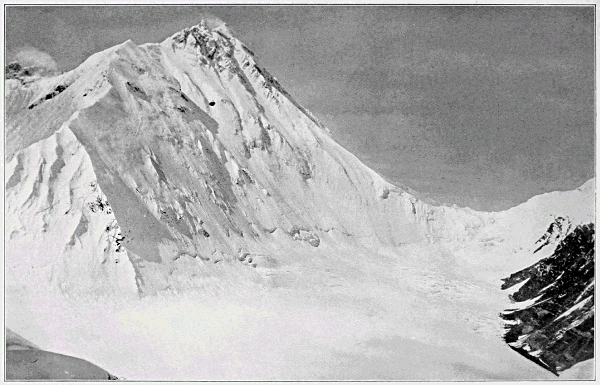
North Col (right) joining the North East shoulder of Everest (left) taken from Lhakpa La. Everest's summit is just visible behind the shoulder. Photograph taken by Howard-Bury.

Diagram of expedition's routes near North Col.

While Mallory and Bullock rested, advance base camp was set up (Note: The team photograph (top) was taken by Wollaston at this location.) at 5,300 metres (17,300 ft) and camp II at 6,100 metres (20,000 ft) on the Kharta glacier, with both camps being left unoccupied. The plan was for camp III on the Lhakpa La, IV on the North Col and one more camp before the summit although, as it turned out, this was to seriously underestimate the difficulties. They had to wait for a month for the monsoon to end and on 31 August all the team tentatively moved to advance base camp with Raeburn, who had unexpectedly returned, able to join them.

They had to stay at advance base camp until 20 September for the weather to improve and then Mallory, Bullock, Morshead and Wheeler set off for and reached Lhakpa La. It was now recognised that the North Col could not be reached without an intermediate camp so they returned to camp II for further supplies so that all the team (except Raeburn) along with twenty-six Sherpas could set off again for camp III. Next morning Mallory, Bullock, Wheeler and three Sherpas went down to the East Rongbuk glacier while the rest of the party turned back. After a very difficult night on the glacier in cold and windy conditions, the following day, 24 September, saw the party reach the North Col although without carrying loads. The terrain on the Col was good for a camp but the wind was extreme and no progress would be possible. They descended to the glacier where Mallory and Bullock calculated that they would not be able to set up a camp on the North Col, nor could they survive a bivouac up there at 7,000 metres (23,000 ft). Also, the gales were getting worse. On 25 September the party was forced to climb again to the Lhakpa La and on 26 September the entire expedition struck all the upper camps, returned to Kharta, and eventually reached Darjeeling on 25 October without mishap.

Howard-Bury was awarded the 1922 Founder's Medal of the Royal Geographical Society for his leadership of the expedition.

== Subsequent events ==
Mount Everest panoramas, taken on the 1921 expedition

Before the expedition had left Tibet, the Mount Everest Committee met and decided that a full assault should be made on the mountain in 1922 with General Bruce as leader. The Rongbuk – East Rongbuk – North Col route would be followed but on this occasion oxygen cylinders would be taken for the climbers. The 1921 expedition was regarded as successful by experts as well as the general public with large numbers of people turning up for the official welcome home by the Royal Geographical Society and the Alpine Club at the Queen's Hall in London. Howard-Bury had become a celebrity. Speaking of the future summit attempt in his Queen's Hall address Mallory said he was "very far from a sanguine estimate of success ... A party or two arriving the top, each so tired that it was beyond helping the other, might provide good copy for the Press but the performance would provoke the censure of reasonable opinion".

Mallory had hoped to give up schoolteaching and to become a mountaineer and writer. When he provided his chapters for Howard-Bury's 1922 book of the expedition it had been on the clear understanding he would be paid. However, in 1923, three months before departing on the 1924 Everest expedition, he had still not received payment. When he pressed the Committee they rescinded their agreement and said he would not be paid but nevertheless they "fully appreciated the value of your contributions". The 1924 expedition was the one from which he would not return, the identity of his remains being discovered in 1999. Bullock's expedition diary was published in 1962.

== Notes ==
=== Romanisations ===
Romanization of place names is very variable so this list is merely to relate those used in Howard-Bury's book to alternative romanisation.
