= Lhagba Pool =

- Location within Tibet
- Location: Mount Everest, Tibet Autonomous Region
- Coordinates: 28°2′20″N 86°57′20″E
- Type: Alpine lake
- Surface elevation: 6,368 metres (20,892 ft)

The Lhagba Pool was a high altitude lake considered to exist, but an examination of evidence, including satellite photos leads to a conclusion that it has dried out. It was considered the highest lake in Tibet and the second highest lake in the world, behind Ojos del Salado's crater lake. The pool was supposed to lie at an elevation of 6,368 metres (20,892 ft) above sea level. It was located between East Rongbuk Glacier and Lhagba La, around 5 km (3.1 mi) north of the Everest summit and 3 km (1.9 mi) east. It was not a major attraction, but was said to be a surprisingly wide (50m) and long (180m) lake.

Sketch map of Everest region

Sketch map of Kharta and environs
