= Kharta =

Tibetan region east of Mount Everest

Coordinates: 28°06′00″N 87°10′00″E

Sketch map of Kharta and environs

Kharta (Note: Kharta is sometimes romanised as Kharda, Khata or Karta.) (Chinese: 卡达) is a region in Tibet lying to the east of Mount Everest and centred on the Kharta valley and Kama valley. (Note: Kama is sometimes romanised as Karma.) The 40-kilometre (25 mi) Kharta valley starts at the col at Lhakpa La at the head of the Kharta Glacier from which the Kharta Chu (Chinese: 卡达曲) river flows east to join the Phung Chu just beyond Khata village.

Nearby to the south, the Kama valley starts at the Kangshung Glacier at the foot of Everest's Kangshung Face, and the Kama Chu flows southeast to the Phung Chu. The 1921 British Mount Everest reconnaissance expedition saw Kharta when reconnoitring ways to climb Mount Everest and managed to reach the North Col via the Lhakpa La. Since that time Kharta has not been used as a way to approach the summit of Everest but the two valleys have become a popular area for trekking.

== Geography ==
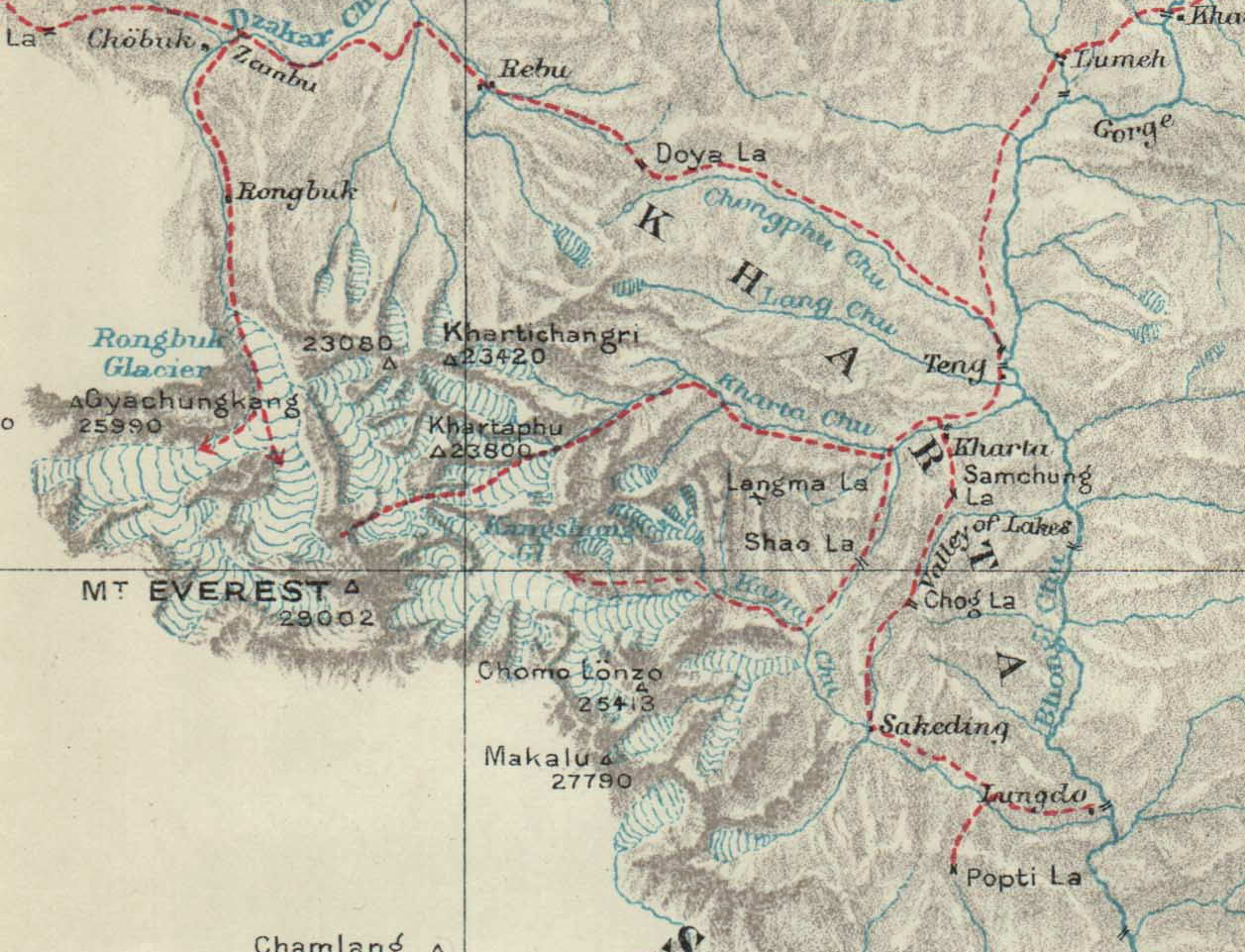
Kharta, Tibet from Morshead's map showing routes taken during the 1921 expedition

Starting at 6,849 metres (22,470 ft) at Lhakpa La, the Kharta Glacier descends about 1,300 metres (4,300 ft) over a distance of some 10 kilometres (6.2 mi) to its snout. The 7,227-metre (23,711 ft) mountain Khartaphu is on the north of the col with Lakpa Ri (7,045 metres (23,114 ft)) and Kartse (6,507 metres (21,348 ft)) to the south. A second glacier descends from Kharta Changri (7,056 metres (23,149 ft)) to the north, converging into the main glacier. Beyond and below the Lhakpa La to the west is the East Rongbuk Glacier, the traditional route for ascending Everest from the north. The glacial river Kharta Chu (Note: "Chu" is Tibetan for river) goes east for the length of the valley and then flows into the Phung Chu at a height of 3,600 metres (11,800 ft). The Phung Chu (called the Arun river in Nepal) descends a deep gorge as it cuts through Himalaya to join the Kosi River above Chatra Gorge.

The Kama valley lies to the south, at its head being the Kangshung Glacier at the foot of the Kangshung Face of Everest. Kama Chu descends the valley southeast and somewhat parallel with Kharta Chu. Several passes cross north-south between the two valleys, the main ones being Karpo La, Langma La and Shao La. (Note: "La" means col or pass in Tibetan)

Kharta and Kama lie in the Mahalangur Himal region of Himalaya in Tingri in Xigazê prefecture of the Tibet Autonomous Region of China. The region is in what was the traditional Tibetan province of Ü-Tsang.

== 1921 British Mount Everest reconnaissance expedition ==
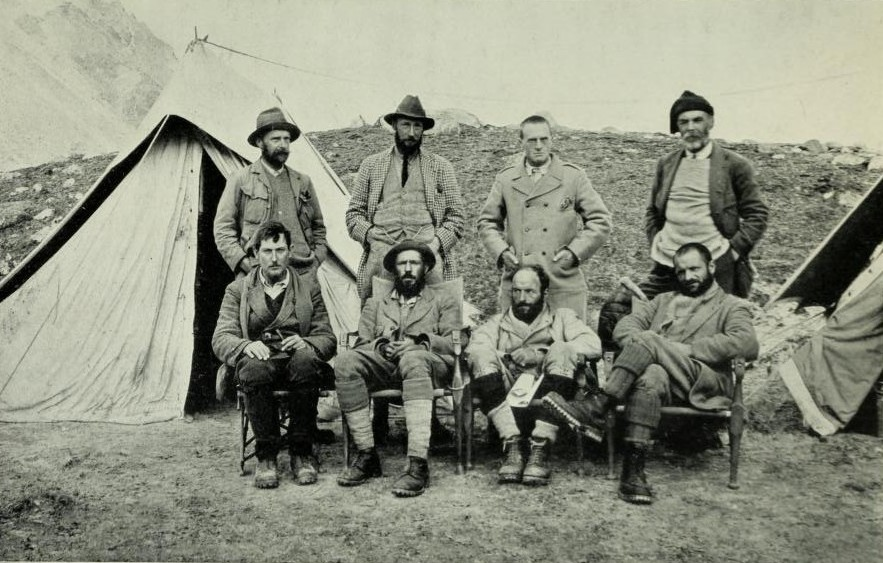
Members of the expedition at the 5200-metre advanced base camp in the Kharta valley

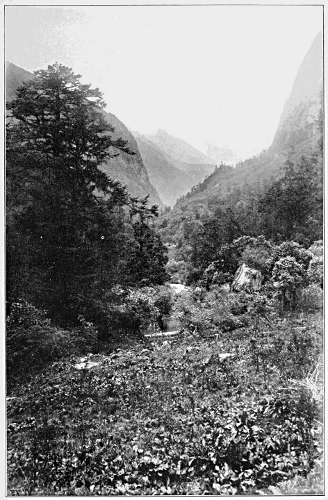
1921 expedition photograph of Kama valley

The expedition was initially based at Tingri to the north of Everest from where the northern and western approaches were explored. While the surveyors and climbers carried out this work, the leader of the expedition, Charles Howard-Bury headed back east to find a suitable base for exploration from the east of the mountain. Knowing by this time that the North Col was a likely good route, Howard-Bury found the glacial Kharta Chu which he guessed might originate from the North Col. He returned to Tingri and then the whole expedition moved to Kharta. From there various parties explored the Kharta and Kama valleys (see maps), eventually discovering that the Kama Chu came from the unscalable Kangshung Face. It turned out that the Kharta Chu came not from the North Col but from the Lhakpa La. Reaching this col, they found that the only way from there to the North Col was to descend some 1,200 feet to the upper East Rongbuk Glacier and climb back up to the North Col. This climb was achieved by George Mallory, Guy Bullock and Oliver Wheeler on 24 September 1921 but they could get no further and had an arduous return.

They found that, compared with the cold barrenness of the Rongbuk valley north of Everest, the Kharta and, even more noticeably, the Kama valleys were warm and verdant. Rhododendron, and scrub birch and juniper cover the valley slopes and willow borders the lower streams. On a practical level they were well afforested with plenty of wood for fuel – at Rongbuk the only fuel had been yak dung.

== Possible childhood home of Tenzing Norgay ==
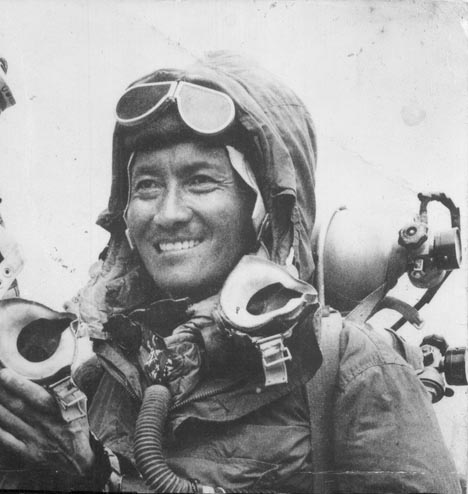
Tenzing Norgay, 1953

Nepali Sherpa mountaineer Tenzing Norgay, one of the first two people to climb Everest, said in his autobiography he was born in the Nepalese village of Thame near Namche Bazaar. However, according to some commentators, including Ed Webster and Tenzing's grandson, he was actually born in Tibet at Tse Chu (Note: Tse Chu is marked on the map at the head of the article.) in the Kama valley near Makalu. At the time, his mother had been visiting the monastery of Namdag Lhe Phodang at Ghang La, which is also in the Kama valley. As a young child he lived at Moyun (Chinese: 木云), (Note: Moyun (marked on the map), also written Mojun.) in the Kharta valley, where his father herded yaks. The herd succumbed to disease, and as a child Tenzing went to Nepal to work for a Sherpa family in Khumbu.

== Trekking ==
The Kharta and Kama valleys are within the Qomolangma National Nature Preserve and provide a quieter area for trekking than Everest Base Camp in the Rongbuk valley. The Kama valley and the Kangshung Face tend to be the focus of the treks but the approach is from the Kharta valley which is returned to after a round tour. Many organisations offer trekking holidays and these are often part bookings on a larger organised expedition. A track passable by four-wheeled drives leaves the Friendship Highway at Tingri from where tickets are available for the guarded Nature Preserve. The track leads to the village of Kharta. The trek may either be by backpacking or after hiring yaks at the village (Note: Many yaks used for trekking are dzo – a cross with a cow. Most yaks are now domesticated and few wild yaks, drong, remain.) A route typically taken (see map) goes up the valley via Yuluk and Yulba and then heads south over Shao La and descends to Kama Chu. The trail ascends the Kama valley with Chomolonzo and Makalu to the south and eventually reaching the Kangshung Glacier to see the Kangshung Face – the glacier has retreated considerably since the 1921 expedition. The return is made over Langma La back to Kharta Chu and then, passing through Lhundrubling, heads eastwards to the start. A local guide is essential (required by the authorities except for organised tours) and the journey on foot or yak takes about 10 days.
