= Edwin Kempson (mountaineer) =

British mountaineer and schoolmaster (1902–1987)

Edwin Garnett Hone Kempson (1902–1987) was a schoolmaster at Marlborough College (1925–1967), Mayor of Marlborough (1946) and a member of the British expeditions to Everest in 1935 and 1936.

== Biography ==
Edwin Kempson was the son of Edwin Hone Kempson, he was born on 4 June 1902 in Castletown, Isle of Man. After schooling at Marlborough College (1916–1921) he went on to study mathematics at Clare College, Cambridge where he was awarded a first-class degree and developed an interest in mountainerring.

He returned to Marlborough College where he taught maths from 1925 to 1967 and for a short period in 1961 he was Acting Master of the School. Kempson married Margaret Cecilia Lloyd on 11 April 1939. He was mayor of Marlborough, Wiltshire in 1946. He died on 25 May 1987.

== Mountaineering ==
Kempson was a member of both the 1935 British Mount Everest reconnaissance expedition and the 1936 British Mount Everest expedition. His experience when he first went to Everest amounted to around twelve years of winter and summer mountaineering in the Alps.

=== Everest 1935 ===
In 1935 Kempson, Eric Shipton, Charles Warren and nine Sherpas, reached Everest's North Col on 12 July with supplies for fifteen days. The monsoon had already arrived and this was the highest point reached by the expedition. Shortly after, Kempson, with Warren and Michael Spender set out to survey the area east of Everest. Whilst Spender was surveying, Kempson and Warren made the first ascent of Kharta Changri 7,056 m (23,150 ft) on 27 July 1935. (Note: The report in the Alpine Journal of 1936 gives the date of the first ascent as 29 August but the 1995 article in the Alpine Journal by Warren, who was one of the first ascentionists, gives the date as 27 July. The 1936 AJ article also records that Kempson left the party before 23 August so the date given for first ascent in that article must be an error.)

=== Everest 1936 ===
During the 1936 expedition Kempson again established the camp at the North Col, when he and Percy Wyn-Harris led a large group of porters there on 14 May. Again this was the highest camp established by the expedition that year. Kempson did manage to visit the Lho La (with J.M.L. Gavin), he wasn't the first to reach that point but the photographs he took of the Western Cwm from this vantage point were of significance in establishing that the Khumbu Icefall could provide a viable approach for the subsequent ascent of Everest from Nepal.

Whilst returning from Everest he made the first ascent of Gordamah Peak 6,800 m (22,300 ft) in Sikkim with Charles Warren, Eric Shipton and Edmund Wigram, and the first ascent, by the west ridge with Eric Shipton, of one of the tops in the Gurudongmar group.

=== Marlborough College Mountaineering Club ===
Kempson established the Marlborough College Mountaineering Club which provided opportunities for small groups of pupils to participate in climbing during the school vacations in North Wales, the Lake District, Skye and the Scottish Highlands. Small groups often visited the Alps, in summer going to the Dauphine, Chamonix, Val d'Isere and other regions, and ski-touring in winter. A number of members of the Marlborough College Mountaineering Club later made significant mountaineering achievements, they included three members of the 1953 British Mount Everest expedition who have each recognised Kempson's influence on their interest in mountaineering: John Hunt, Charles Wylie and Michael Ward.

== Literary scholarship ==
During his period as Mayor of Marlborough a collection of valuable 17th century books were discovered in Marlborough Town Hall. The Marlborough Vicar's Library was bequeathed to the town by Rev William White in 1678 for the use by the Vicar of St Marys. The oldest book was published in 1487 and 237 items were printed in Britain before 1641, of which 8 are the only known copies and another 45 are rare. Most of the 600 volumes are theological, works of scholarship and school books. They include 13 specimens of the grammatical treatises of Robert Whittington and a volume of 5 tracts by John Stanbridge (of which 4 are unique). Classics, literature, political tracts, history, law and medicine are also represented. Kempson researched and catalogued the collection. The Vicar's Library was donated on permanent loan to the Bodleian Library, Oxford in 1985, the Mayors of Marlborough continue to be the collection's trustees.

Kempson also held the position of Archivist of Marlborough College, a post that he relinquished in 1986.

== Legacy ==
The Marlborough College Outdoor Activities Department is housed in the "Kempson Centre" and the college established the "Kempson Trust" after his death.
