= Mahalangur Himal =

Himalayan subrange containing Mt Everest

- Location within Nepal

Highest point
- Peak: Mount Everest
- Elevation: 8,848 m (29,029 ft)
- Coordinates: 27°59′17″N 86°55′31″E

Dimensions
- Length: 80 km (50 mi) ESE
- Width: 65 km (40 mi) NNE
- Area: 5,200 km^{2} (2,000 mi^{2})

Naming
- Native name: महालंगूर हिमाल (Nepali)

Geography
- Countries: Nepal and China
- Districts: Solukhumbu District, Sankhuwasabha District and Tingri County
- Range coordinates: 27°55′N 86°45′E
- Parent range: Himalayas
- Borders on: Rolwaling Himal

Mahālangūr Himāl (Nepali: महालङ्गूर हिमाल, Mahālaṅgūra himāla) is a section of the Himalayas in northeast Nepal and south-central Tibet of China extending east from the pass Nangpa La between Rolwaling Himal and Cho Oyu, to the Arun River. It includes Mount Everest, Lhotse, Makalu, and Cho Oyu — four of Earth's six highest peaks. On the Tibetan side it is drained by the Rongbuk and Kangshung Glaciers and on the Nepali side by Barun, Ngojumba and Khumbu Glaciers and others. All are tributaries to the Koshi River via Arun River on the north and east or Dudh Kosi on the south.

Mahalangur Himal can be divided into three subsections:

- Makālu (Nepali: मकालु) nearest the Arun River and along the Nepal-China border including Makalu 8463 m, Chomo Lonzo 7790 m south of the Kama valley in Tibet, Kangchungtse or Makalu II 7678 m, Peak 7199 and some ten others over 6000 metres.
- Barun (Nepali: बरुण, Baruṇa) inside Nepal and south of the Makālu section. It includes Chamlang 7319 m and Chamlang East 7235 m, Peak 7316, Baruntse 7129 m, Ama Dablam 6812 m and about 17 others over 6000 metres.
- Khumbu (Nepali: खुम्बु) along the international border west of the Makalu section, including the Everest massif: Everest 8848 m, Lhotse 8516 m, Nuptse 7855 m and Changtse 7580 m. West of Everest are Pumori 7161 m and Cho Oyu 8201 m plus some 20 others over 7000 metres and 36 over 6000 metres.

The Khumbu region of Nepal is the best known populated part of the Mahalangur since it is on the access trail to the normal (South Col) route up Everest.

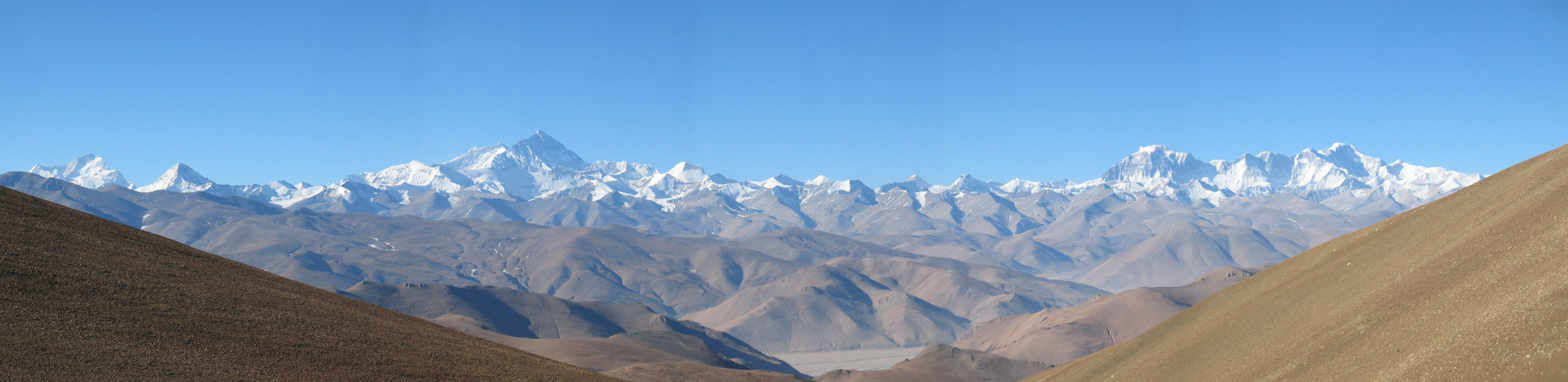
North side: Makalu, Lhotse, Everest, Gyachung Kang and Cho Oyu from Tibet
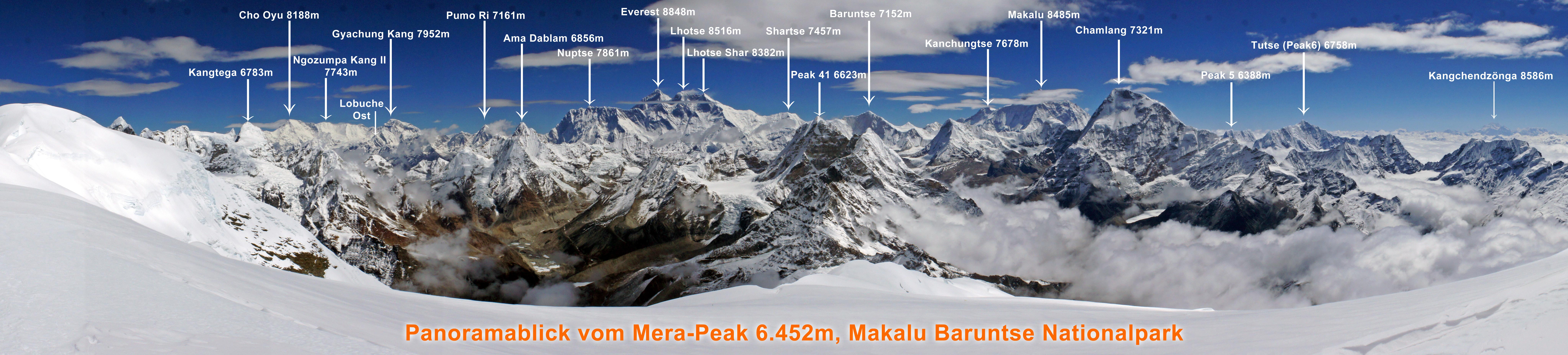
South Side: View from Mera Peak
