= Chamlang =

Mountain in Nepal

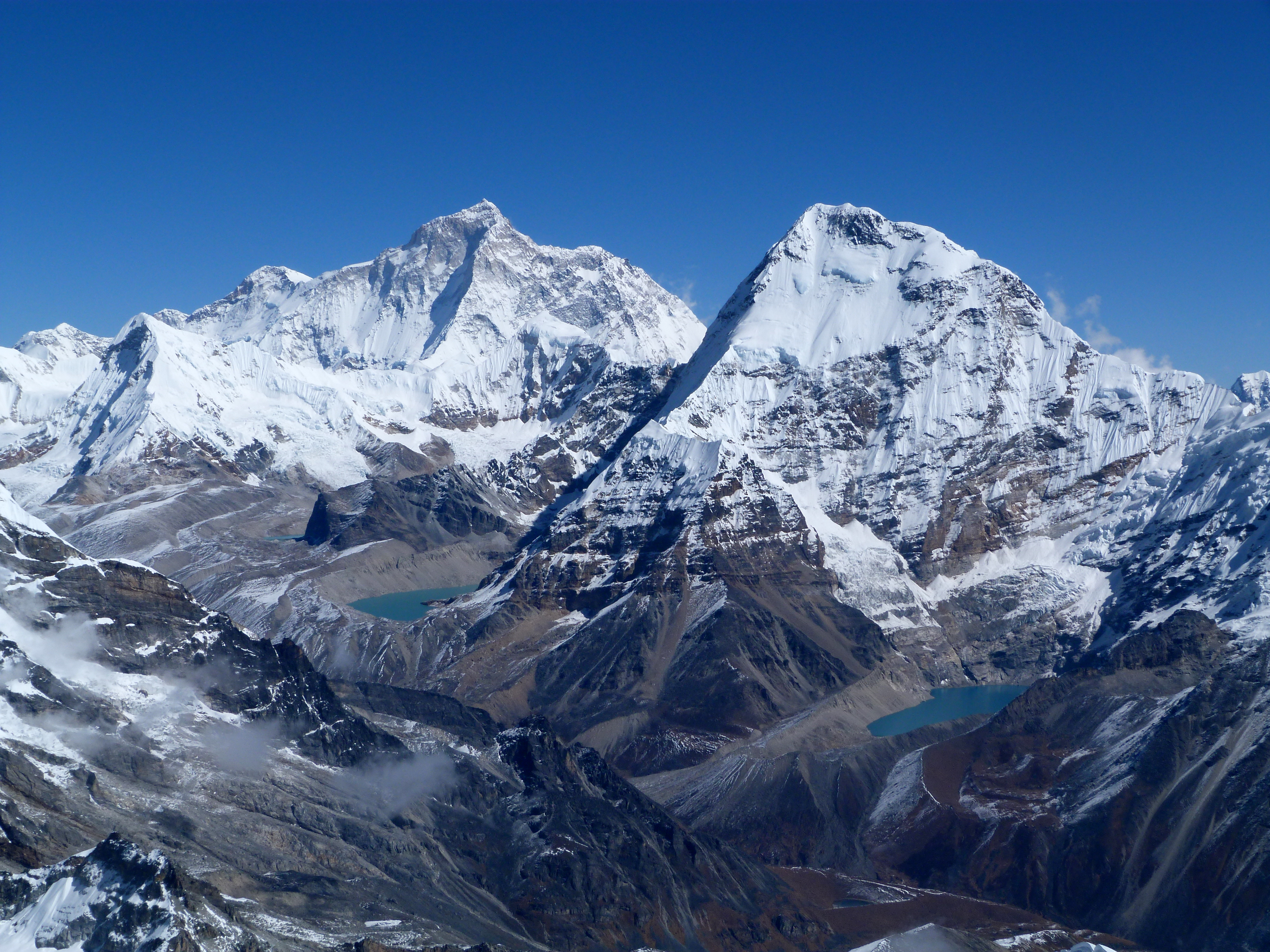
- Southwestern views of Makalu (left) and Chamlang (right) as seen from Mera Peak

Highest point
- Elevation: 7,319 m (24,012 ft); Ranked 79th
- Prominence: 1,193 m (3,914 ft)
- Listing: Mountains of Nepal
- Coordinates: 27°46′32″N 86°58′47″E

Geography
- Location within Koshi Province Location within Nepal
- Location: Sankhuwasabha District, Koshi Province, Nepal
- Parent range: Mahalangur, Himalayas

Climbing
- First ascent: 31 May 1962

Chamlang is a mountain in the Mahalangur subrange of the Himalayas in eastern Nepal. It is located southwest of Makalu and south of Baruntse. It rises to an elevation of 7,319 m (24,012 ft). It was first climbed in May 1962 by Japanese So Anma and Nepalese Sherpa Pasang Phutar III as a part of a Japanese mountaineering expedition.

== Etymology ==
The name "Chamlang" means "big bird flapping wings" in the local language. According to Seiki Nakano, who led the first successful expedition to the mountain, the name could have arisen because of the mountain resembling a large white bird spreading its wings.

== Geography ==
Chamlang is located in the Baru section of the Mahalangur subrange of the Himalayas in eastern Nepal. It is located about 10 km (6.2 mi) south of Baruntse, and 10 km (6.2 mi) southwest of Makalu along the eastern edge of the Hongu Valley. It rises to an elevation of 7,319 m (24,012 ft) with a topographic prominence of 1,193 m (3,914 ft). The mountain has an extensive northern face, which stretches for more than 8 km (5.0 mi) and consists of several subsidiary summits and ridges.

== Mountaineering ==
The Himalayan Expedition of the New Zealand Alpine Club led by Edmund Hillary to the Barun Valley in 1954, explored approaches to Chamlang. In 1955, Norman Hardie and A. J. Macdonald conducted a survey of the mountain and identified a possible climbing route along its southern ridge.

The first ascent of Chamlang was made in May 1962 by Japanese climber So Anma and Nepalese Sherpa Pasang Phutar III of the Academic Alpine Club of Hokkaido. The expedition consisted of a seven member Japanese team along with five sherpas and was led by Seiki Nakano. The expedition approached the mountain through the Hongu Valley and established its base camp at 4,800 m (15,700 ft). They took the 'Chohatsu' route, along the glacier between the western and southern ridges before establishing camp 3 at 6,300 m (20,700 ft) along the southern ridge. Camp 4 was established at 6,650 m (21,820 ft), Anma and Pasang Phutar made their final ascent from a snow cave at approximately 6,850 m (22,470 ft). They reached the summit at 2 pm on 31 May after sheltering in a bivouac due to strong winds and cold conditions.

In May 2019, the Czech mountaineering team of Zdeněk Hák and Marek Holeček, completed the first ascent of the northwest face of Chamlang. The team reached the summit after five days of climb along a new route, which they named after Doug Scott and Reinhold Messner.

In 2021, a new, direct line up the north face was climbed by two French mountain guides, Charles Dubouloz and Benjamin Vedrines. The pair took four days to complete the climb.
