= Kangshung Glacier =

Glacier in Tibet

Kangshung
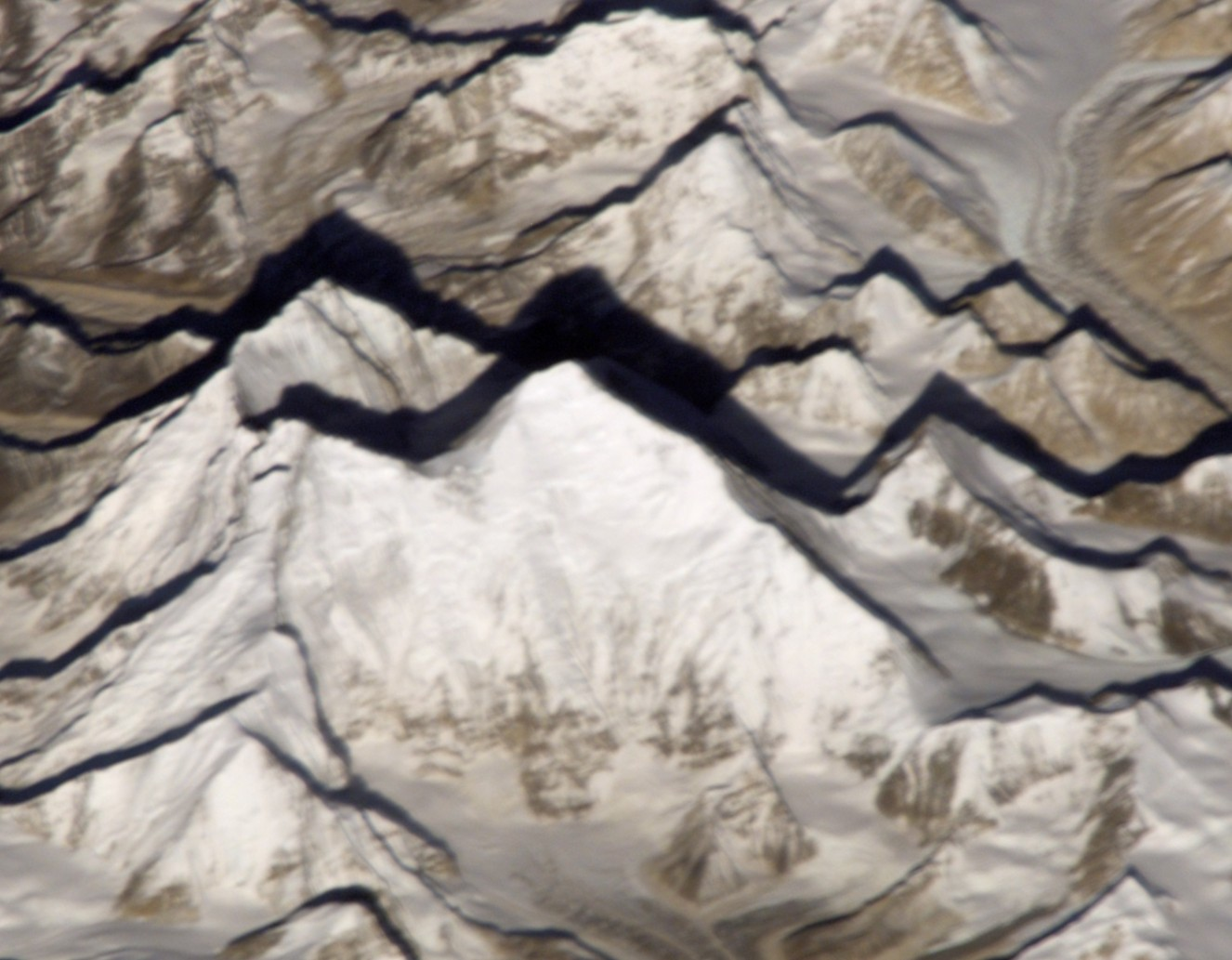
- The east Kangshung Face of Everest (centre) and Lhotse (left). Kangshung Glacier in lower foreground.

- Location within Tibet
- Interactive map of Kangshung
- Type: Valley glacier
- Location: Tibel
- Coordinates: 27°59′06″N 87°02′59″E

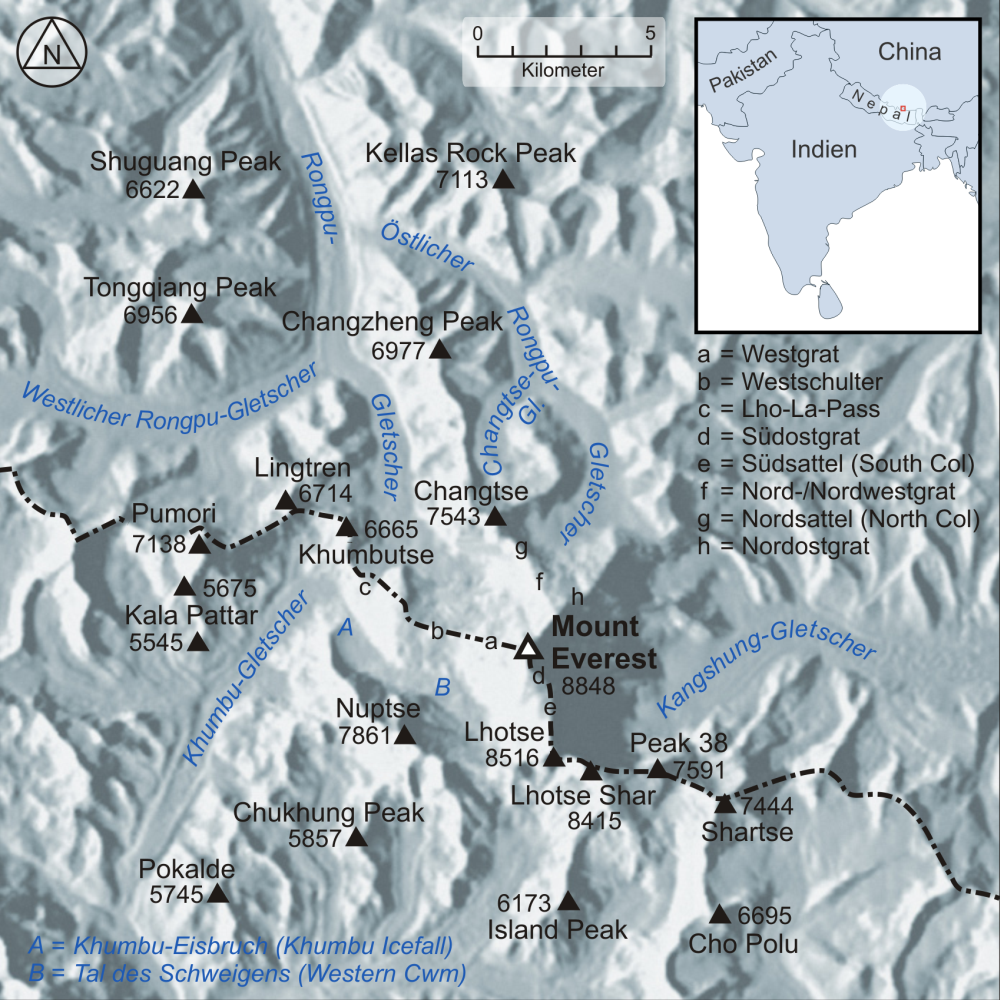
Course of the Kangshung Glacier in the Mount Everest region of Himalayas.

The Kangshung Glacier (Chinese: 卓穷冰川) is one of the three main glaciers of Mount Everest, and is in the Tibet region Himalayas, within the Tibet Autonomous Region of China. The other two are the Khumbu Glacier and Rongbuk Glacier.

== Geography ==
The Kangshung Glacier's accumulation areas lie on the three main faces of Everest. The Kangshung Glacier is located on the eastern side of the world's highest mountain in the government district of Shigatse in the Tibet Autonomous Region of the People's Republic of China.

The common eastern face of Everest and Lhotse is called the Kangshung Face. Here, the Kangshung Glacier is fed and then becomes the Kama Chu river to flow through the Kama valley towards the east. South of the glacier and east of Lhotse lie the Pethangtse (6738 m), and the massif of the Makalu (8463 m) with its neighbouring peaks of Makalu II (7678 m − also called Kangshungtse) and Chomo Lonzo (7818 m), whose imposing north face hides the view of the main Makalu summit. The border between Nepal and China runs over this summit.

=== Access ===
The east side of Mount Everest is the least accessible and developed side of the mountain. While the base camp on the Rongbuk Glacier can be accessed by jeep and the south side of Everest can be reached after a multi-day hike using fortified lodges for overnight stays, the Kangshung Glacier can only be reached following an approach march of several days from Kharta, including crossing via the Shao La or Langma La passes into the Kama valley.

=== Melting ===
Global climate change during the past decades is accelerating the process in which the glaciers in the region are melting.

== See also ==
- Glaciers of the Himalayas
