= 1938 British Mount Everest expedition =

Unsuccessful expedition led by Bill Tilman

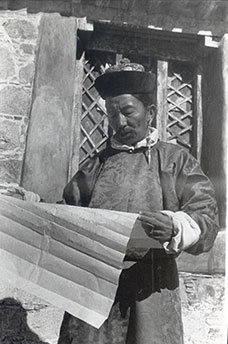
Norbu Dhondup in Lhasa, Tibet in 1937 with Tibetan government (Kashag) passport or Lamyig for the 1938 British Mount Everest Expedition

Led by Bill Tilman, the 1938 British Mount Everest expedition was a low-key, low-cost expedition which was unlucky in encountering a very early monsoon. The weather conditions defeated the attempts to reach the summit. The North Col was climbed for the first time from the west and an altitude of 27,200 feet (8,300 m) was reached on the North Ridge.

== Background ==
After the failure of the 1936 British Mount Everest expedition, the Mount Everest Committee decided not to make another public appeal for funds even after Tibet had approved an expedition for 1938. The press and public were no longer interested and, at a time of austerity, such things were seen as extravagant. However, The Times was willing to provide a limited budget and this matched the small scale, even austere, type of venture advocated by the leading British climbers of the day, Eric Shipton and Bill Tilman – similar to their 1935 reconnaissance. At a meeting in February 1937 Tilman was appointed leader and Tom Longstaff, who had in years gone by been the climber–doctor on the 1922 Everest expedition provided £3,000 on condition that there would be no advance publicity and that, where possible, the climbers would each pay their own way.

== Planning ==
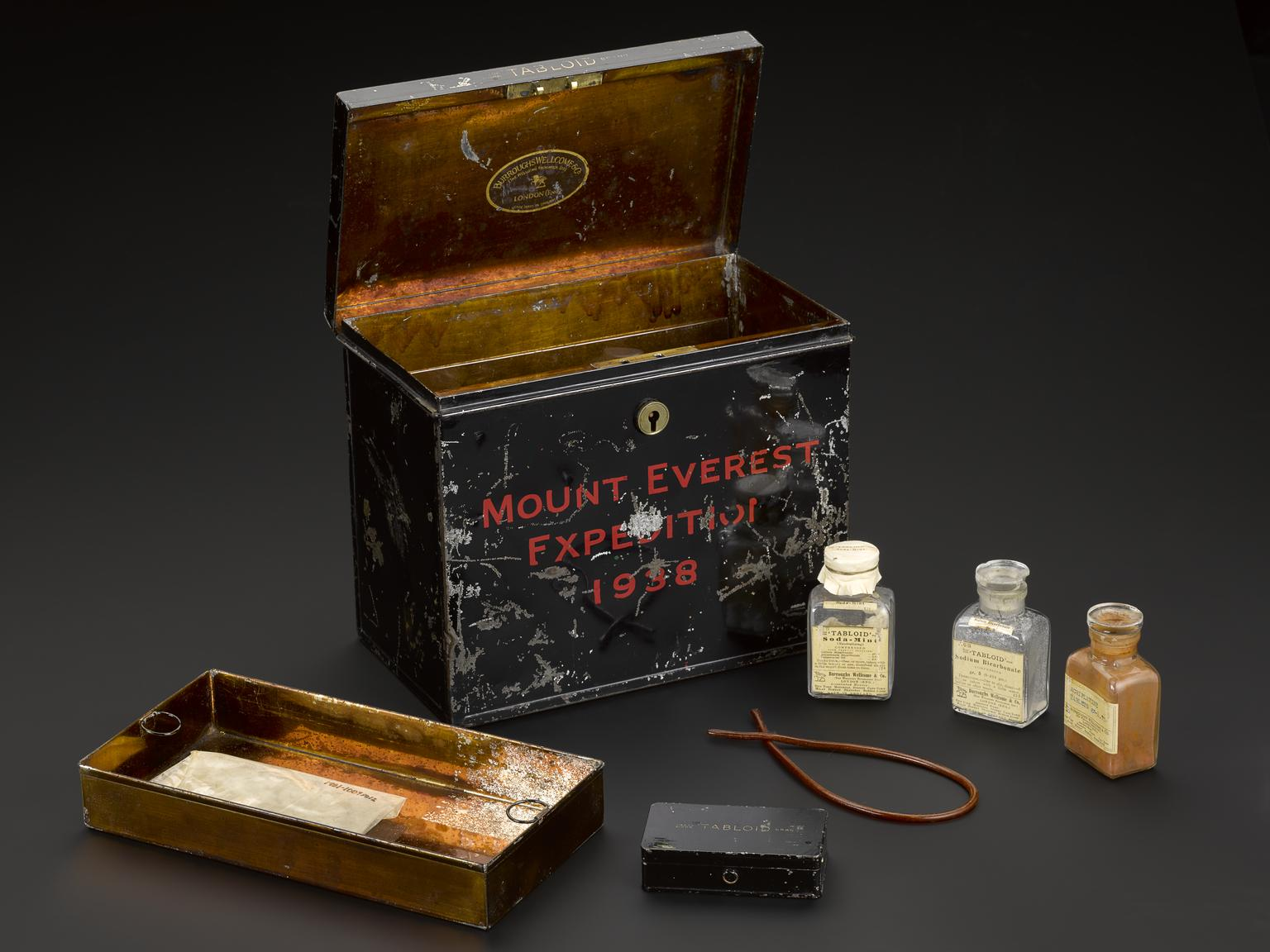
Medical equipment taken on the expedition

Alongside Tilman and Shipton, Frank Smythe, Noel Odell, Peter Lloyd, Peter Oliver and Charles Warren agreed to participate. Ang Tharkay was sirdar and Tenzing Norgay was one of the Sherpas and Karma Paul joined the expedition as "the zealous and energetic interpreter and general factotum". Jack Longland was invited but he had to decline because his employers would not grant him leave. (Note: All except Lloyd had been on previous Everest expeditions: Tilman 1935; Shipton 1933, 1935, 1936; Smythe 1933, 1936; Odell 1924; Oliver 1936; Warren 1935, 1936 (Longland 1933). Tilman, Odell and Lloyd had been on the highly successful 1936 Nanda Devi expedition.) The team was very strong and were, according to Shipton, "socially harmonious". Tilman considered a party of seven to be unnecessarily large but acquiesced saying "it represents a high margin of safety against casualties". The cost was to be £2,360 compared with £10,000 for the attempt of 1936. Radios were not taken because Tilman regarded them as unnecessary but there was too much pressure on him for him to refuse to take oxygen equipment. As on the 1935 Shipton–Tilman expedition, the provision of food was extremely basic – Tilman included soup and porridge as "goodies".

== Expedition ==
Sketch map of region north of Mount Everest

Arriving in Gangtok, Sikkim on 3 March 1938, the party crossed the Sebu La into Tibet hoping to reach Rongbuk well before the monsoon was expected to break. Because winter was scarcely over it was very cold on the march-in (Note: Secondary sources say the weather was cold but Tilman says it was "mild") and snow was deep but they reached Rongbuk on 6 April – over a week earlier than any other team had achieved – to find Mount Everest blown clear of snow. Forty-five Shepas arrived having come from Solu Khumbu in Nepal via Nangpa La. Taking what had become the traditional approach to the summit up the East Rongbuk Glacier, Camp III was established at the head of the glacier but the temperature was too cold to attempt the climb up to the North Col. Indeed, with the exception of Shipton, all the climbers were suffering from ailments related to the severe cold. Shipton and Smythe, who were being regarded as the pair most likely to be making the summit attempt, had been sent over the 22,000-foot (6,700 m) Lhakpa La to the Kharta valley to recuperate and now the rest of the team joined them there to enjoy a week in springtime conditions in meadows and forests.

When they returned via the Doya La to Rongbuk they found it had been snowing there for a week and the monsoon had broken on 5 May – three weeks earlier than experienced by previous expeditions. They returned to Camp III and on 18 May climbed to the North Col with surprisingly little difficulty. Shipton and Smythe rejoined them after returning over the Lhakpa La. Heavy snow fell in the night and it was not until 24 May that they were able to start to establish Camp IV on the North Col. The conditions there were warm but the snow was deep and they realised they would have to reconcile themselves to attempting the summit during the monsoon.

Tilman made a plan involving splitting the party. Travelling via Rongbuk, the climbers Shipton, Smythe and Lloyd were to move to the main Rongbuk Glacier to attempt the North Col from the west. The others occupied Camp IV on 28 May. Tenzing led up the North Ridge but the snow was so deep, especially towards the summit, that Tilman decided against even trying to establish Camp V. Even more snow forced a retreat to Camp III from where Tilman went around to join the western team. They eventually reached the North Col from the west under dangerous snow conditions although the gradient was not so steep – it was the first time the Col had been reached from this side. On this occasion on the North Ridge they were able to establish Camp VI at 27,200 feet (8,300 m) but beyond that conditions were close to impossible – Shipton and Smythe and then Tilman and Lloyd only managed to climb slightly above the camp. In the end it was decided to withdraw completely by descending to the East Rongbuk Glacier. Tenzing and the Pasang Bhotia had performed exceptionally strongly up to Camp VI but on the North Col Pasang had a stroke which paralysed him on his right hand side and he became delirious. He had to be carried down from the mountain but he went on to make quite a good recovery.

Oliver returned ahead of the others, staying with Norman Odling in Kalimpong. Odling had been hospitable to climbers on previous expeditions but, unknown to Oliver, he also was a Reuters correspondent. He reported the story he had been told. The Times was scooped and the Mount Everest Committee had to repay £850.

== Achievements ==
The expedition demonstrated that a small party possibly offered as much chance of reaching the summit as a large one. However, it also showed that the monsoon was not a viable time to be making any summit attempt at least from the north or Tibetan side of Everest (the Swiss in 1952 made a second post-monsoon attempt). The Sherpas were tremendously improving their climbing technique and for the first time were able to take a leading role, even encouraging the Europeans to continue upward.

A closed-circuit oxygen set was not a success and was "abandoned on account of the sensation of suffocation which developed after a short period of use." However, Lloyd found the open-circuit design was a definite advantage above 26,000 feet (7,900 m), although Shipton was not convinced that Lloyd's performance was significantly better than Tilman's. It was George Finch who had advocated open-circuit apparatus, against the advice of the other "experts" and this knowledge eventually was used in the planning of the successful 1953 expedition (which used both open and closed-circuit sets).

The party returned to a Europe descending towards World War II but with the Mount Everest Committee requesting Tibetan permits for 1941, 1942 and 1943. All this was not to be and after the war the Dalai Lama did not respond to requests and then in 1950 Tibetan borders were firmly closed with the occupation of Tibet by China. So, post-war British Everest attempts would be from Nepal to the south.
