= Rongbuk =

Rongbuk may refer to:

- Rongbuk Glacier
- Rongbuk Monastery
- Nike Rongbuk, an athletic shoe by Nike, Inc.
