= Karma Paul =

Tibetan interpreter (1894-1984)

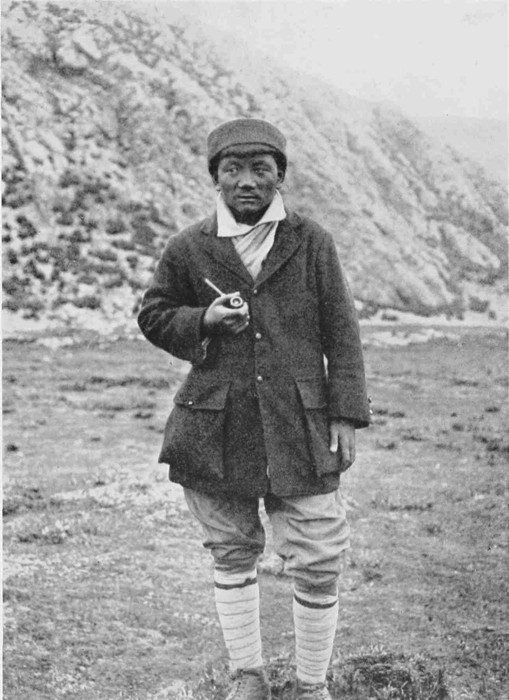
- Karma Paul in 1922
- Born: 1894; Lhasa
- Died: 1984 (aged 89–90)

Karma Paul (1894–1984) was a Tibetan who lived in Darjeeling and accompanied six of the early British Mount Everest expeditions, as their interpreter, between the years 1922–1938. He was born as Karma Palden in Tibet in 1894 and died in 1984.

== Biography ==
Karma Paul was born in Lhasa, Tibet. His parents died when he was twelve and he was raised as an orphan by missionaries in Darjeeling.

He worked in Calcutta and had been a schoolmaster in Darjeeling until he was recruited, in 1922, to accompany his first expedition to Everest as an interpreter. At that time he was 28 years old and able to speak English, Tibetan, Nepali, Bengali, and various Himalayan dialects.

He was born a Buddhist and raised by Christian missionaries; from his 20s his religious affinities were ambiguous, "When he was Karma he was a Buddhist, and received blessings from every Lama he could get near to. When he was Paul he was a Christian". When meeting the Rongbuk Lama he was "very much of a Buddhist". When visiting the Tibetan Mission in Darjeeling he was ostensibly a practising Christian and he had 2 children who were educated in Christian schools. One of them, Lamu Amatya, became the first Nepalese-trained nurse.

By the 1940s he was described as "sirdar" and "a business man from Darjeeling". He had become an entrepreneur, trained himself to be a skilled auto mechanic and ran a taxi service in Darjeeling. He also owned a large number of racing ponies, and in the 1950s he made "a small fortune" from horse racing.

=== The early Everest expeditions ===
Karma Paul filled the role of interpreter for six of the British Everest expeditions (1922, 1924, 1933, 1935, 1936 and 1938). Each of these expeditions approached the mountain from the northern, Tibetan, side whereas the later large expeditions approached the mountain from the southern, Nepali, side.

In 1921/22, before being involved with Everest, Karma Paul had taught Tibetan to Henry Morshead who worked for the Survey of India. Morshead's testimonial described Paul as "well educated and intelligent". Morshead had been a member of the 1921 British Mount Everest reconnaissance expedition and also became a member of the 1922 British Mount Everest expedition.

General Bruce, the leader of the 1922 British Mount Everest expedition, was the first to recruit Karma Paul as interpreter. As well as speaking the various local languages he was also able to both read and write English (at one stage during the expedition Morshead was unable to write because he had frostbitten fingers and Karma Paul wrote a letter on his behalf). In the film Climbing Mount Everest, made during the 1922 expedition by John Noel, he can be seen (at around 35–38 minutes) dressed in similar clothes to the European expedition members, with a collar and tie and a watch-chain, acting as a go-between during the formalities between the Lama of Rongbuk Monastery and members of the British expedition.

Bruce regarded Karma Paul as "the most important subordinate member of the Expedition" and "quite new to the kind of work that he would have to do" he was "a great acquisition to the Expedition, always good company and always cheerful, full of a quaint little vanity of his own and delighted when he was praised. He served us very well indeed from one end of the Expedition to the other, and it was a great deal owing to his cheerfulness and to his excellent manners and way with the Tibetans that we never had the smallest possible misunderstanding with any officials, even of the lowest grades, to disturb our good relations with the Tibetans of any kind or class."

=== Everest and Nanda Devi in the 1930s ===
Eric Shipton had been a member of the British Everest expedition in 1933 and felt that "Our contact with the Tibetan people was made pleasant and easy by our Tibetan interpreter Karma Paul". Later, when Shipton was arranging his 1934 expedition to Nanda Devi with Bill Tilman, he sought assistance from Karma Paul: "Before leaving England I had arranged with Karma Paul to engage the services of three of the sherpas who had been with us on Everest the previous year – Angtarkay, Pasang and Kusang – and to send them down from Darjeeling to meet us in Calcutta, At Vizagapatam we sent him a wire informing him of the date of our arrival".

Then in 1935, when Shipton was the leader of the British Everest reconnaissance expedition, Karma Paul introduced Shipton to Tenzing Norgay. That introduction gave Tenzing his first opportunity to climb on Everest and take the first step towards his eventual success in reaching the top of Everest during the first ascent with the 1953 Everest expedition.

The 1938 British Mount Everest expedition was the last of the major British expeditions to Everest which involved Karma Paul. He was accompanied on the expedition by a servant named Pensho who "grooms and rides racing ponies in Darjeeling in ordinary life sometimes for Karma Paul". Before leaving Darjeeling the expedition leader, Bill Tilman, "was obliged to borrow a suit of Karma Paul's as my own was condemned as unsuitable for a luncheon party".

=== Darjeeling go-between ===
After he had taken part in a few Everest expeditions Karma Paul became a go-between in Darjeeling for a range of visitors heading into the mountains who were looking for local staff to support them. In 1933 Maurice Wilson met Karma Paul and talked with about his plans to make an illegal journey into Tibet so that he could attempt Everest alone. Karma Paul agreed to accompany him to a base camp in Tibet but "as they grew better acquainted a mutual distrust and dislike built up which finally dissolved the partnership" and, when Wilson set out from Darjeeling, Karma Paul was not with him.

Earl Denman also visited Karma Paul's office before his illicit attempt to climb Everest in 1947 and he described Karma Paul as "a heavily built man, broad and short, of more than middle age". It was Karma Paul who suggested that Tenzing might act as one of Denman's sherpas and much of the discussion between Denman and Tenzing concerning this arrangement was through Karma Paul as interpreter.

In 1948 the Italian orientalist Prof Giuseppi Tucci sought Karma Paul's assistance in engaging local staff when he arrived in Darjeeling at the start of one of his several expeditions into Tibet.
