= Maurice Wilson =

British soldier, mystic, and aviator

- Wilson with his aeroplane, Ever Wrest, before his flight to India
- Born: 21 April 1898; Bradford, West Yorkshire, England, UK
- Died: c. 31 May 1934 (aged 36); Mount Everest, Nepal
- Cause of death: Exhaustion
- Occupations: Aviator and soldier
- Known for: Attempted solo ascent of Everest

Maurice Wilson MC (21 April 1898 – c. 31 May 1934) was a British soldier, mystic, and aviator who is known for his ill-fated attempt to climb Mount Everest alone in 1934.

Often characterised as "eccentric", Wilson wished to climb Everest as a platform to promote his belief that the world's problems could be solved by a combination of fasting and faith in God. Despite his lack of mountaineering or flying experience, he succeeded in flying from Britain to India, surreptitiously entering Tibet and climbing as high as 6,920 metres (22,703 ft) on Everest. However, Wilson died in his attempt, and his body was found the following year by a British expedition.

== Early life and wartime service ==
Maurice Wilson was born in Bradford, West Yorkshire, to a woollen mill owner, and would have grown up expecting to work in the mill with his father and brothers. However, the outbreak of the First World War changed his expectations, and Wilson joined the British Army on his eighteenth birthday. He quickly rose through the ranks in the army, eventually becoming a Captain. Posted to France in November 1917, Wilson was awarded the Military Cross in April 1918 for his part in an engagement near Wytschaete where, as the only uninjured survivor of his unit, he single-handedly held a machine gun post against advancing Germans. The citation for the award read:

2nd Lt. Maurice Wilson, W. York. R. For conspicuous gallantry and devotion to duty. He held a post in advance of the line under very heavy shell and machine-gun fire on both flanks after the machine guns covering his flanks had been withdrawn. It was largely owing to his pluck and determination in holding this post that the enemy attack was held up.

Several months later Wilson was seriously injured by machine gun fire near Ypres and was sent home. His injuries never completely healed, and his left arm in particular caused him pain for the rest of his life.

== Illness and recovery ==
Wilson left the army in 1919, and like many of the "Lost Generation" found the transition to postwar civilian life extremely difficult. For several years he wandered, living in London, the United States and New Zealand and holding a variety of jobs. Despite the financial success which would eventually make his adventure possible, Wilson never achieved happiness; he became physically and mentally ill, lost weight and suffered repeated coughing spasms.

Wilson's illness came to an abrupt end in 1932, when he underwent a secretive treatment involving thirty-five days of intensive prayer and complete fasting. He claimed that the technique had come from a mysterious man he had met in Mayfair who had cured himself and over 100 other people of diseases which doctors had declared incurable. However, Wilson never named this man, and it has been questioned whether he really existed, or whether the treatment came from Wilson's own blend of Christianity and Eastern mysticism. Regardless of its source, Wilson's belief in the power of prayer and fasting became absolute, and spreading the word of these powers became his vocation in life.

== Preparations for Everest ==
The idea of climbing Mount Everest came to Wilson while he was recuperating in Germany's Black Forest. Inspired by press cuttings about the 1924 British expedition and the upcoming Houston Everest Flight, he became convinced that fasting and prayer would enable him to succeed where George Mallory and Andrew Irvine had failed, which would prove to the world the power of his beliefs. He clearly saw this as part of his vocation, describing climbing Everest as "the job I've been given to do".

Wilson formed a plan to fly a small aeroplane to Tibet, crash-land it on the upper slopes of Everest, and walk to the summit. It was a bold plan; a solo flight halfway across the world would have been a significant undertaking for the best aviators of the day, while no mountaineer of the time would have contemplated a solo ascent of Everest – a feat which was not to be achieved until 1980. A practical problem was posed by the fact that Wilson knew nothing about either flying or mountaineering, so he set out to learn these.

Wilson purchased a three-year-old de Havilland DH.60 Moth, which he christened Ever Wrest, and set about learning the rudiments of flying. He was a poor student who took twice the average length of time to gain his pilot's licence, and was told by his instructor that he would never reach India. However, he did obtain his licence, and the scepticism of his peers only increased his determination – he told his instructor that he would reach Everest, or die in the attempt.

Wilson's preparation for the mountaineering challenge that lay ahead was even worse than his preparation for the flight. He bought no specialist equipment and made no attempt to learn technical mountaineering skills, such as the use of an ice axe and crampons. Instead, he spent just five weeks walking around the modest hills of Snowdonia and the Lake District before he declared himself ready.

It has been pointed out that Wilson's naivety may have been partly due to the style of the reports of the early British Everest expeditions. With lingering Victorian restraint, mountaineering literature of the time often downplayed the risks and difficulties faced by the early climbers, dismissing avalanche-prone slopes, steep ice walls and sheer rock faces as "bothers", and putting little emphasis on the debilitating effects of high altitude, which were still poorly understood. However, it is still surprising that Wilson did not attempt to learn how to climb on snow, when a simple look at a photograph of the mountain would have told him that it would be required.

== Solo flight to India ==
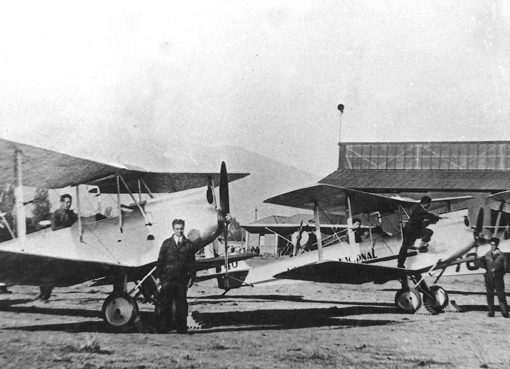
Gipsy Moth aircraft, similar to the one Wilson flew to India

Wilson planned to depart for Tibet in April 1933, but was delayed when he crashed Ever Wrest in a field near Bradford. He was unhurt, but the crash caused damage to the plane which would take three weeks to repair and added significantly to the press attention he was receiving. It also attracted the attention of the Air Ministry, which forbade him from making his flight.

Ignoring the Air Ministry's ban, Wilson finally set off on 21 May and remarkably, and in spite of the best efforts of the British government, he succeeded in reaching India two weeks later. On his arrival in Cairo his permission to fly over Persia had been withdrawn. Undeterred, he flew on to Bahrain, where he was refused permission to refuel on the orders of the British consulate, which explained as all the easterly airstrips within his aircraft's range were in Persia, he could not be allowed to continue.

Wilson was allowed to refuel when he agreed to retrace his route and return to Britain, but once airborne he turned his plane towards India. The airstrip at Gwadar, the most westerly in India, was not actually within his aircraft's range, but almost precisely at its limit; after nine hours in the air Wilson arrived with his fuel gauge reading zero. Having arrived safely in India he continued across the country, but his flight ended in Lalbalu when the authorities reiterated that he would not be allowed to fly over Nepal and impounded his plane to prevent him from trying.

== Journey across India to Tibet ==
After trying and failing to get permission to enter Tibet on foot, Wilson spent the winter in Darjeeling fasting and planning an illicit journey to the base of Everest. Whilst in Darjeeling he met Karma Paul and talked with him about his plans. Although Karma Paul initially agreed to accompany Wilson to a base camp in Tibet, "as they grew better acquainted a mutual distrust and dislike built up which finally dissolved the partnership". Then, by chance he met three Sherpas: Tewang, Rinzing and Tsering, all of whom had worked as porters on the 1933 Everest expedition led by Hugh Ruttledge, and who were willing to accompany him.

On 21 March 1934, Wilson and his three companions slipped out of Darjeeling disguised as Buddhist monks. Wilson pretended to be deaf and dumb and in weak health to avoid suspicion. They reached the Rongbuk Monastery on 14 April, where he was warmly received and given access to the equipment left behind by Ruttledge's expedition. However, he stayed only two days before setting off alone for Everest itself.

== Attempts on Everest ==
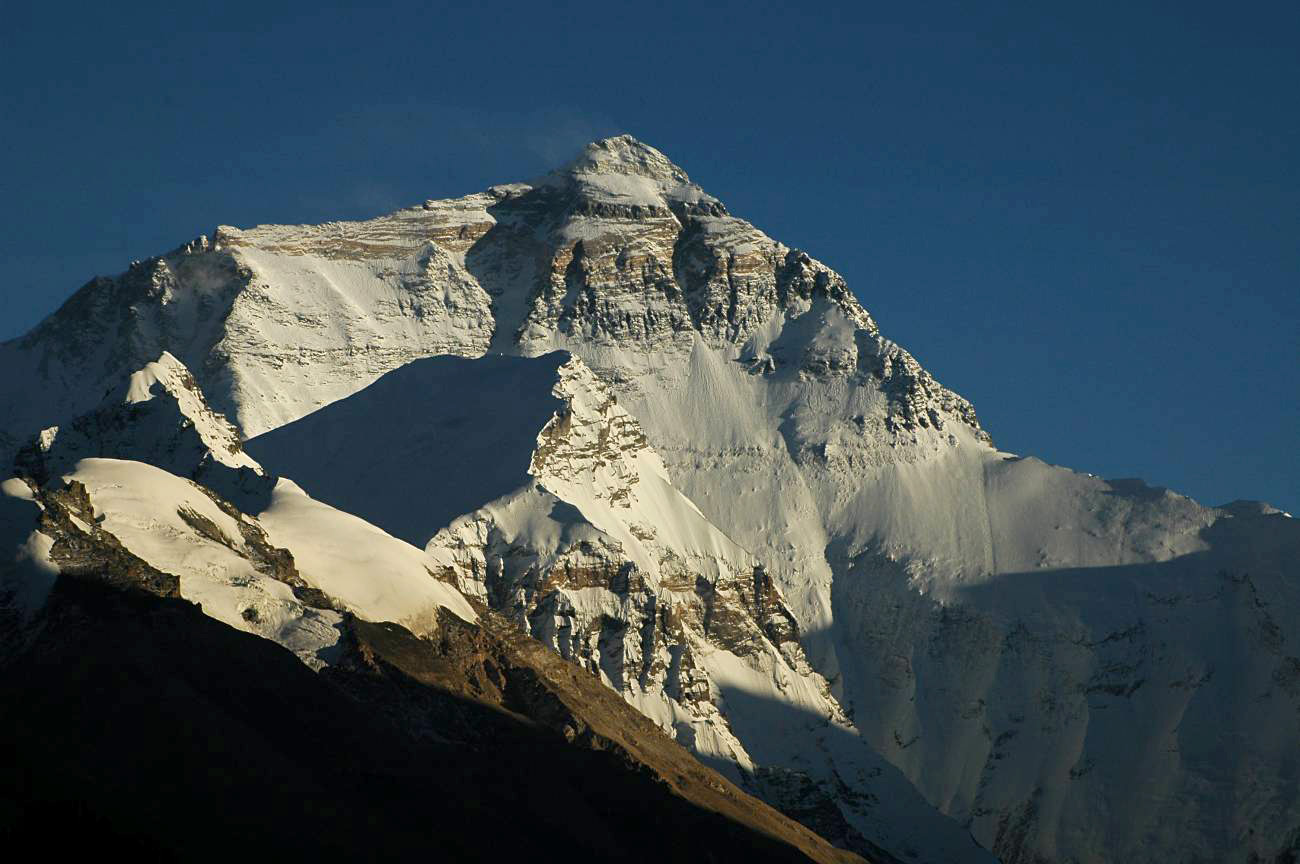
The North Face of Mount Everest, seen from the Rongbuk Monastery

Most of what is known about Wilson's activities on the mountain itself come from his diary, which was recovered the following year and is now stored in the Alpine Club archives. Completely inexperienced in glacier travel, Wilson found the trek up the Rongbuk Glacier extremely difficult and constantly lost his bearing and had to retrace his steps. He showed his lack of experience when he found a pair of crampons at an old camp, which would have helped him tremendously, but threw them away.

After five days and in worsening weather, Wilson was still two miles short of Ruttledge's Camp III below the North Col. He wrote in his diary, "It's the weather that's beaten me – what damned bad luck," and began a gruelling four-day retreat down the glacier. He arrived back at the monastery exhausted, snowblind and in great pain from his war wounds and a badly twisted ankle.

It took eighteen days for Wilson to recover from his ordeal, yet he set forth again on 12 May, this time taking Tewand and Rinzing with him. With the Sherpas' knowledge of the glacier they made quicker progress and in three days they reached Camp III near the base of the slopes below the North Col. Confined to camp for several days by bad weather, Wilson considered possible routes by which he could climb the icy slopes above, and made a telling comment in his diary.

Not taking short cut to Camp V as at first intended as should have to cut my own road up the ice and that's no good when there is already a hand rope and steps (if still there) to Camp IV.

The entry showing how Wilson thought steps cut into the ice the previous year might still be present has been cited as particularly strong evidence of his ignorance of the mountain environment, and of his continuing failure to understand the task before him. When, on the 21st, he finally made an abortive attempt to climb to the North Col, he was extremely disappointed to find no trace of the rope, or the steps.

The next day Wilson began a further attempt to reach the Col. After four days of slow progress and camping on exposed ledges, he was defeated by a forty-foot (12 m) ice wall at around 22,700 feet (6,900 m) which had stretched Frank Smythe to his limit in 1933. On his return the Sherpas pleaded with him to return with them to the monastery, but he refused. Whether he still believed that he could climb the mountain, or whether he continued merely because he was now resigned to his fate and preferred death to the humiliation of an unsuccessful return to Britain, has been hotly debated. Writing in his diary, "This will be a last effort, and I feel successful," he set out for the last time on 29 May, alone. Too weak to attempt the Col that day, he camped at its base, a few hundred yards from where the Sherpas were camped. The next day he stayed in bed. His last diary entry was dated 31 May, and read simply, "Off again, gorgeous day."

When Wilson did not return from his last attempt, Tewand and Rinzing left the mountain. They reached Kalimpong in late July, giving the world the first news of Wilson's death.

== Discovery ==
In 1935, Eric Shipton led a small reconnaissance expedition to Everest. Dr Charles Warren found Wilson's body at the foot of the North Col, lying on its side in the snow and surrounded by the remains of a tent which had been torn apart by the elements. A rucksack containing his diary was found nearby. The body was buried in a nearby crevasse. It is assumed that Wilson died in his tent of exhaustion or starvation. The exact date of his death is unknown.

== Summit controversy ==
In 2003, Thomas Noy proposed that Wilson might have reached the summit of Everest and died on his descent. The main evidence in support of this theory comes from an interview Noy conducted with the Tibetan climber Gombu, who reached the summit with the Chinese expedition of 1960. Gombu recalled having found the remains of an old tent at 8500 m. If true, this would be higher than any of the camps established by the previous British expeditions, and Noy suggests that it must have been put there by Wilson, showing that he reached a much higher point than previously believed. Noy's theory has not found widespread support in the mountaineering community.

There is much scepticism that an inexperienced amateur like Wilson could have climbed the mountain unassisted, and Chris Bonington has said, "I think you can say with absolute certainty that he would have had no chance whatsoever." Climbing historian Jochen Hemmleb and Wilson's biographer, Peter Meier-Hüsing, have both suggested that Gombu was mistaken about the altitude of the tent and pointed out that his account has not been borne out by other members of the 1960 expedition. It has also been suggested that if the tent at 8500 m did exist, it might have been a relic of the rumoured Soviet expedition of 1952. However, the existence of the Soviet expedition is itself uncertain.

== See also ==
- List of people who died climbing Mount Everest
- Timeline of climbing Mount Everest
