= Ang Tharkay =

Nepalese sherpa and sirdar (1907–1981)

- Ang Tharkay in 1935 on the Everest expedition

Personal information
- Nationality: Nepalese
- Born: 1907 Khumbu, Nepal
- Died: 28 July 1981 (aged about 74) Kathmandu, Nepal
- Occupation: Mountaineering
- Years active: 1931–1970
- Height: 5 ft 0 in (152 cm)
- Spouse: Ang Yangjin
- Children: 5

Ang Tharkay (1907 – 28 July 1981) was a renowned Nepalese Sherpa mountain climber and explorer who acted as a guide and later sirdar for many Himalayan expeditions. He was "beyond question the outstanding Sherpa of his era" and he introduced Tenzing Norgay to the world of mountaineering.

== Personal life ==
Ang Tharkay (his name is also often written Angtharkay or Angtarkay) was born in 1907 to a poor family in Kunde, just north of Namche Bazaar in the Solukhumbu district of Nepal, near Mount Everest. Hoping to make a living as a mountaineering porter, like many ambitious boys of his era living near Everest, at the age of twelve he migrated to Darjeeling in India which was where many expeditions selected Sherpa guides and porters.

He was married to Ang Yangjin and they had a daughter and four sons. He was well-built though only about 5 feet (1.5 m) tall. In 1954 the Himalayan Mountaineering Institute in Darjeeling sent him to Switzerland on a technical climbing course. In 1954 he set up his own trekking business in Darjeeling (although he was independently advertising his services for visits to Sikkim and Tibet as early as 1946) and published his autobiography Mémoires d'un Sherpa (in French) – he was the first mountaineering Sherpa to write a book. He also became a successful road building contractor in western Sikkim.

When he retired from active mountaineering around 1962 he returned to Nepal to farm a large area of land to the south of Kathmandu. He then started another trekking agency Nepal Trekking. He died of cancer in Kathmandu in 1981.

== Major expeditions ==
The first time Ang Tharkay was chosen for an expedition was in 1931 by a German party for Kangchenjunga. (Note: Ward is quite definite that Ang Tharkay's first expedition was in 1931. However, on the 1922 Everest expedition a Sherpa of the same name was rescued, unconscious, from the catastrophic North Col avalanche and then he returned for the 1924 expedition when Charles Bruce said he did not think he had ever recovered from his 1922 expedience. It therefore seems these were two different people.) He was then included in the team for British attempt on Everest in 1933 where he became honoured as one of the "Tigers" – one who carried to over 27,000 feet (8,200 m). Eric Shipton, who had also been in the 1933 party, selected him (effectively as sirdar) for the 1934 Nanda Devi exploration as well as for Shipton's return visit to Nanda Devi in 1936 – he had not been available when Bill Tilman was recruiting Sherpas for the 1936 ascent of Nanda Devi. There were two occasions on the 1934 expedition when Shipton credits him with finding a route when everyone else had thought they would have to turn back.

He was on the 1935 British Everest expedition and it was because of Ang Tharkay that a friend of his, Tenzing Norgay, got his first engagement as a Sherpa guide. Also that year Ang Tharkay was in the party supporting Reginald Cooke's solo ascent of Kabru. Cooke later said that because he found him to be the most reliable of the Sherpas he "stupidly left him in charge of Base Camp and did not take him to the summit". Ang Tharkay was sirdar in 1937 for Shipton's five-month survey of 1,800 square miles (4,700 km^{2}) of Karakoram territory north of K2 and again on the 1938 Everest expedition.

He was sirdar on the successful 1950 French Annapurna expedition with Maurice Herzog and Louis Lachenal to Annapurna, the first eight-thousander to be climbed. Herzog had invited him to be in the summit team but Ang Tharkay had declined, saying his feet were starting to freeze. Herzog and Lachenal, descending from the summit, had dreadfully frostbitten feet and had to be carried down by the Sherpas, including Ang Tharkay. In his 1954 memoirs he made particular mention that he was treated with friendship and equality by the French climbers. He was awarded the Légion d'honneur – the first Sherpa to receive a European honour.

On Shipton's British Everest reconnaissance in 1951 the party had entered Tibet, which they knew was not permitted, but they hoped they would not be noticed. However, things went wrong and they were apprehended by an armed militia. There was shouting on both sides for ten minutes until Ang Tharkay, who was sirdar, asked the Europeans to move away. There followed twenty minutes of further loud argument after which he came back to the sahibs, grinning – they were to be released for payment of seven rupees which Ang Tharkay had been arguing down from ten. Shipton had been worrying because he only had 1200 rupees to purchase their freedom.

Ang Tharkay went as sirdar to Cho Oyu in 1952, to Dhaulagiri and Nun in 1953, Makalu in 1954 and Kamet (reaching the summit) in 1955. In 1962 he had to be coaxed out of his retirement to be sirdar for an Indian expedition to Everest where they reached the South Col. This made him the oldest person to climb to eight thousand metres. Ang Tharkay took a party to the Annapurna Sanctuary in 1975, and in 1978 at the age of 70 he led the Sherpas for the French attempt on Dhaulagiri.

== Appreciation ==
The Royal Geographical Society said of Ang Tharkay, "He was exceptional as both climber and sirdar, and his character won high praise from all who knew him". Cooke considered him "one of the bravest, most intelligent, and adventurous of all the young Sherpas".

Shipton wrote, "We soon learned to value his rare qualities, qualities which made him outstandingly the best of all the Sherpas I have known. He had a shrewd judgement both of men and of situations, and was absolutely steady in any crisis. He was a most lovable person, modest and unselfish and completely sincere, with an infectious gaiety of spirit. He has been with me on all my subsequent journeys to the Himalayas, and to him I owe a large measure of their success and much of my enjoyment".

He was awarded a Tiger Badge by the Himalayan Club in 1939, in recognition of his contribution to the 1938 British Mount Everest expedition.
