= 1935 British Mount Everest reconnaissance expedition =

Mountaineering expedition led by Eric Shipton

Precipitated by unexpected permission from Tibet, the 1935 British Mount Everest reconnaissance expedition was planned at short notice as a preliminary to an attempt on the summit of Mount Everest in 1936. After exceptionally rancorous arguments involving the Mount Everest Committee in London, Eric Shipton was appointed leader following his successful trekking expedition to the Nanda Devi region in India in 1934.

Compared with what had gone before and had followed, it was a small, low-cost affair. The approach was from the north side of the mountain and the climbing was planned to be after the monsoon. The monsoon was unusually late that year and beset by the weather and difficult conditions of snow, little was achieved regarding the summit. However, a very large number of lesser peaks were climbed for the first time and a southern route up the Western Cwm was identified as a possible line of approach if Nepal could ever be persuaded to change its policy of not admitting climbers.

Eventually, the expedition would have considerable influence on post-war British efforts on Everest from Nepal, with Shipton himself leading the 1951 southern reconnaissance.

== Background ==
The British had been sending expeditions to Mount Everest since the 1921 reconnaissance but none had managed to reach the summit. These had been planned and financed by the Mount Everest Committee, a joint committee of the Royal Geographical Society and the Alpine Club. With the 1933 expedition, a new team of climbers had reached as high as ever before and it was felt they had done well. Even if the leader, Hugh Ruttledge, had not been a conspicuous success, no criticisms of his leadership had been voiced. The mountaineering establishment did not think that the decision against using supplementary oxygen had contributed to the expedition not reaching the summit. Anyway, the Mount Everest Committee requested permission from Tibet for a further attempt on the mountain and reappointed Ruttledge as leader. This did not please some people, particularly the younger climbers, who viewed the requirement to be the technical climbing of the mountain, to be led from the front, and not a geographical exploration planned and led by men with no recent experience of mountaineering. The mild-mannered Ruttledge (who was 50 years old and walked with a limp) took the brunt of the criticism and in March 1934 his offer to resign from the leadership was accepted by the committee which expressed its regret and said it was in any case unlikely there would be an expedition in the near future.

When, completely unexpectedly in early 1935, the Tibetan government gave permission for Everest expeditions in 1935 and 1936, the committee decided to send out a reconnaissance expedition to take place after the 1935 monsoon. There was too little time and money available to embark on anything more elaborate in that year. Purely out of courtesy, they offered the leadership to Ruttledge who caught them by surprise by accepting. This produced a storm of protest with a faction arising that supported for the leadership Colin Crawford (who had been on both the 1922 expedition and the 1933 expedition). Taken aback, Ruttledge resigned again. Unable to continue with Ruttledge but unwilling to appoint Crawford, who many on the committee saw as the cause of the trouble, as late as March 1935 the leadership was being offered to at least seven other people, all of whom declined. The committee was forced into a difficult meeting to interview Ruttledge and Crawford for the position and the subsequent vote was a tie, resolved by the chairman voting for Ruttledge. Further rancour led to Crawford being removed from the committee, Strutt resigning in protest, and a number of resignations from the Alpine Club for its refusal to support Crawford's protest.

== Shipton's and Tilman's involvement ==
Eric Shipton had been to Himalaya when he had taken part in the 1933 Everest expedition after which he and Lawrence Wager had travelled back to Sikkim separately from the rest of the party using an entirely unexplored route. This led to him favouring mountain climbing by trekking, with exploration being the main aim, rather than the type of largescale expedition such as the one he had just been on. The following year, he and Bill Tilman led a lightweight trekking expedition (Note: Two climbers, three Sherpas and a dozen porters.) to the region of Nanda Devi and in so doing became the first people to get into the Nanda Devi Sanctuary, which they did by ascending the Rishi Ganga gorge. Shipton and Tilman started planning a return trip for 1935, this time hoping to reach Nanda Devi's summit by its South Ridge. In February 1935, before that trip had been started, Shipton spoke about Nanda Devi at a Royal Geographical Society meeting and received a "rapturous" reception by a large audience who was attracted as much by his charisma as his mountaineering achievements. One aspect would turn out to be of great interest to the Everest Committee – the entire expedition had cost £287. (Note: The 1933 and 1936 expeditions each cost over £10,000.)

Following Tibet's unexpected offer, the Mount Everest Committee decided on an attempt on the summit for 1936 but preceded by a reconnaissance in the current year. Tom Longstaff had been very praising of the Nanda Devi trek and so this approach would be used for 1935 on Everest. The reconnaissance could be mounted quickly and paid for out of the existing funds of £1,400 so that all the new funds raised could be allocated to the 1936 bid for the summit. Shipton was offered the leadership of the 1935 slot with Ruttledge's approval. He would not be able to reach the region before July which was expected to be after the start of the monsoon but this would allow the team to find out whether the monsoon snow had sufficiently consolidated. (Note: The monsoon normally starts in late May to late June.)

== Expedition preliminaries ==
As well as testing conditions during and after the monsoon, the expedition was to test likely climbers for 1936 and follow up the exploratory work of the 1921 reconnaissance. Explicitly there was to be no summit attempt and supplementary oxygen was not going to be used. Tilman initially regretted having to abandon the Nanda Devi summit attempt but Shipton persuaded him by the lightweight exploratory nature of what was being planned. Charles Warren and Edmund Wigram, both Cambridge medics, Edwin Kempson a Cambridge mathematician, and Dan Bryant, (Note: Dan Bryant's full name was Leslie Vickery Bryant.) an ice climber from New Zealand agreed to take part. Shipton considered this complement quite ample but he found he had a surveyor, Michael Spender added to the team. Spender had made himself extremely unpopular on earlier expeditions due to his conceit and there were rumours that his inclusion was due to mischief making. All the same, Shipton and Spender became close friends.

Shipton deplored the extravagant lifestyle practised by the earlier British expeditions. He consulted a nutritionist at the Lister Institute to determine an efficient diet producing 4000 Calories a day in conjunction with locally sourced food. Lentils, dried vegetables and powdered milk were on the menu with the addition of cod liver oil along with ascorbic acid and ferrous sulphate tablets. This contrasted with the caviare, foie gras, quails' eggs and lobster of 1933 and even Shipton later admitted "In 1935 I went rather too far the other way: it was bad policy to force people who were quite unused to rough food to make such a complete break with their normal diet."

The team members reached India and met at Darjeeling on 21 May 1935. With the help of Karma Paul, who had been on all the Everest expeditions since 1922, they engaged fourteen Sherpas but Shipton decided he needed perhaps a couple more and a nineteen-year-old was selected. He was completely inexperienced in mountaineering but was chosen according to Shipton (Note: Shipton's versions of events are not always to be taken seriously.) largely because of his attractive grin – Tenzing Norgay. The party headed north through Sikkim into Tibet and then travelled west towards Everest on a route through Sar – further south and nearer to Nepal than earlier expeditions had used. When they reached the Nyonno Ri (28°12′18″N 87°36′30″E) and Ama Drime (28°05′05″N 87°36′24″E) mountains they split into three groups for exploration. This had all been contrary to the stipulations in their passports issued by Tibet and they were ordered back north through Gyankar Nangpar and onto the traditional road. Earlier from Nyonno Ri they had had a fine view of Everest in unusually good weather conditions and it has since been speculated that, had they made a dash for the summit, they might have succeeded. However, Shipton made no such bid, and indeed it was forbidden by his passport and by the remit of the expedition. They reached Rongbuk Monastery on 4 July.

== North Col ==
Sketch map of region north of Mount Everest

Leaving Spender to survey the region of the North Face, the party ascended the East Rongbuk Glacier to reach the foot of the North Col on 8 July – in good time despite general poor health. Bryant had been particularly ill – he had lost 14 pounds (6.4 kg) in three days – so he descended to Rongbuk. While moving camp III slightly higher they discovered the remains of Maurice Wilson, the eccentric British solo climber who had died in 1934. They went on to set up camp next to a food dump that had been left in 1933 – Carlsbad plums from Fortnum and Mason and chocolate were now added to the menu much to the relief of most of the party. The old route up to the col was this year not passable so they took a line to the right that then required a long traverse. They reached the 23,030-foot (7,020 m) Col at a second attempt on 12 July but from there upward there was continuous heavy monsoon snow and conditions underfoot proved impossible.

On 16 July they started to descend from the Col. Reaching the traverse they found there had been an immense avalanche which had carried away both old and new snow to a depth of about 6 feet (2 m) and this showed that their ascent had actually been very hazardous. They reached camp III safety but decided that any further attempt on the Col was far too dangerous. Whilst this had been going on Spender had been surveying and Wigram and Tilman had climbed the Lhakpa La and its two flanking peaks. Lhakpa La is the col that was traversed by the 1921 expedition after ascending the Kharta valley.

== Peak bagging ==
The party then split up to take part in what Shipton described as "a veritable orgy of mountain climbing". Two teams separately climbed the 23,640-foot (7,210 m) Khartaphu. Then Kempson and Warren climbed the 23,070-foot (7,030 m) Kharta Changri and two other nearby peaks while Spender surveyed that region and also while Shipton, Wigram and Tilman climbed 23,190-foot (7,070 m) Kellas Rock Peak and three more mountains. All the peaks, including those mentioned in passing, are over 21,000 feet (6,400 m).

Kempson had to return home but the rest of the party divided into three mountaineering pairs. Spender and Warren continued the survey. Shipton and Bryant travelled to the West Rongbuk Glacier to make first ascents of Lingtren and its outliers and Lingtrennup. (Note: Lingtrennup is the peak called "Island Peak" by Mallory in 1921.) Looking down to the Western Cwm in Nepal Shipton thought this might provide a route worth exploring for a southern attempt on Everest's summit. Tilman and Wigram went up the main Rongbuk Glacier to Lho La from where they decided that the West Ridge provided no way to the summit and that from the Lho La itself there was no means of descent to the Western Cwm. They all met up on at Rongbuk on 14 August from where they all attempted the 24,730-foot (7,540 m) Changtse but had to give up at 23,000 feet (7,000 m) because of snow. The Changtse attempt had been deliberately delayed to test high-altitude snow conditions at different stages of the monsoon.

Returning to Rongbuk, they trekked across country to the Kharta valley hoping to again explore Nyonno Ri but this was forbidden by the authorities. On the border of Tibet and Sikkim they climbed in the Dodang Nyima range before getting back to Darjeeling.

== Sighting the Western Cwm and Solu Khumbu ==
In 1921 George Mallory and Guy Bullock had reached an unnamed col between Pumori and Lingtren and Mallory reported on looking down on the Western Cwm "However, we have seen this Western Glacier and are not sorry we have not to go up it. It is terribly steep and broken." Shipton and Bryant reached the same point on 9 August 1935 but, despite waiting several hours, mist prevented any view of the Cwm. They again reached the col on 11 August and on this occasion the mist cleared after many hours and they were able to get the first photograph of the Khumbu Icefall leading up to the Western Cwm. (Note: Mallory had taken a photograph in 1921 that showed the Icefall but the Western Cwm was hidden in mist.) Bryant wrote "A westerly spur of Nuptse curled round to the north thus squeezing the glacier of the upper basin into a narrow lip over which it poured in a gigantic ice-fall, a wild tumble of contorted ice, to the Khumbu Glacier 2,000 feet below. The cwm itself must be an amazing place, completely ringed in as it is, except for that narrow entrance, by a mountain wall nowhere less than 25,000 feet high." Shipton reported how the Sherpas became quite excited as they recognised landmarks in their homeland, the Solu Khumbu. He said of the route up the icefall and cwm "it did not look impossible, and I should very much like to have the opportunity one day of exploring it".

== Achievements and legacy ==
The expedition had succeeded in climbing 26 peaks of over 20,000 feet (6,100 m) – as many as had been achieved by all previous mountaineering expeditions put together. Of these, 24 were first ascents. In 1994 Warren remembered, "This surely must have been one of the most enjoyable of all the expeditions to Mount Everest. It was small and achieved the objectives set for it at little cost." Judged in these ways, and by the surveying results achieved, the expedition was a success but one that never caught the imagination of the press or public – it was the only pre-Second World War British expedition that did not publish a book afterwards.

The expedition's experiences led to some questionable conclusions being drawn. The monsoon conditions had been bad and climbing had not been possible over 23,000 feet (7,000 m). Also, it was not realised that in 1935 the monsoon had been exceptionally late (starting 26 June) – at this time the timing of the monsoon was not really understood at all. (Note: Unsworth gives the following dates for the start of the monsoon: 7 July 1921, first week of June 1922, 16 June 1924, 30 May 1933, 26 June 1935, 25 May 1936, 5 May 1938.) The intended pre-monsoon 1936 expedition was wrecked by the particularly early monsoon that started that year on 25 May. All this led to no post-monsoon attempts being made on Everest until the Swiss expedition in the autumn of 1952 (see also 1975 British Mount Everest Southwest Face expedition) and it was only gradually discovered that the post-monsoon period is not necessarily unfavourable. The lightweight approach had, in itself, not been a clear success. Everest expeditions, and especially British-led ones, reverted to the large scale military type and this was to continue into the 1970s. Tilman and Bryant had not coped at all well above 23,000 feet (7,000 m) and so they were ruled out for 1936. It was not understood at that time that a climber's acclimatisation can vary greatly from year to year. Tilman was to prove this point because in 1936 he and Noel Odell were to make the first ascent of the 25,645-foot (7,817 m) Nanda Devi, the highest mountain climbed until Annapurna in 1950.

The expedition was to have an unlikely influence on the 1953 British Mount Everest expedition, the first time the summit was reached. Tenzing Norgay had been impressive in 1935 – in future years he went on to be Sherpa many times on Everest, including on the 1952 Swiss Mount Everest expeditions. In fact he was on all the subsequent British expeditions, including 1936 and 1938, culminating in his reaching the summit of Everest in 1953. On the 1935 occasion New Zealander Dan Bryant had not been good at altitude but he had become very popular and particularly well-respected by the rest of the party. When Shipton was assembling his team for the 1951 Everest reconnaissance he received an application from an unknown New Zealander at a time when British climbers were strongly favoured. With happy memories of Bryant, Shipton personally decided to appoint the New Zealander later writing, "My momentary caprice was to have far reaching results". Following his success in 1951, Ed Hillary was invited back to Everest in 1953.
