= Earl Denman =

Canadian mountain climber

Earl Lionel Denman (1914-1994) was a Canadian mountaineer and engineer who attempted to climb Mount Everest in 1947.

== Biography ==
Denman was born on 11 December 1914 in Tod Inlet on Vancouver Island but grew up in England. He was a Canadian mountaineer who attempted to climb Mount Everest in 1947. By 1947 he was working as an engineer in Southern Rhodesia.

== Everest 1947 ==
His illegal attempt was very different from the large-scale efforts by British mountaineers around the same time. He had little experience, having only climbed the smaller Virunga Mountains in East Africa before this expedition. He did not have much money, equipment, or fuel, and entered Tibet without permission. In Darjeeling he happened to pass a shop window in which was displayed some photographs of snow-capped mountains and noticed that the name of the shop's proprietor was familiar to him from Everest books he had read, in so doing he had stumbled upon a way of meeting Karma Paul who had provided support for six major expeditions which had travelled to Tibetan side of Everest. Because of the experience with Maurice Wilson, an earlier solo traveller to Everest, Karma Paul was unwilling to help Denman but he did put him in touch with the two sherpas who were willing to accompany him.

The two Sherpas were Tenzing Norgay, later to make the first ascent of Everest and Ang Dawa. Norgay later said that he knew Denman had little chance of succeeding, but that he agreed to join Denman because "the pull of Everest was stronger for me than any force on earth." After a trekking across Tibet, Denman and the two Sherpas started their ascent on April 9, 1947. They reached about 22,000 ft (6,700 m) of the roughly 29,000 ft (8,800 m) mountain before a storm compelled them to abort the attempt and turn back.

== After Everest ==
Denman tried to return to Everest in 1948, but couldn't leave India. In 1954 his autobiography Alone to Everest of his Everest attempt was published. Later he fought Apartheid in South Africa, where he was living in the 1960s before he was thrown out of the country.

In 1982 he was living in New Zealand. Denman died in New Zealand on 9 December 1994.

== Sources ==
- Alone to Everest, by Earl Denman, Collins, 1954, pp. 256
- Everest, by Walt Unsworth
- Tiger of the Snows/Man of Everest, by Tenzing Norgay and James Ramsey Ullman
- Into Thin Air, beginning of Chapter 7, by Jon Krakauer

"Gipfel ohne Götter ",2. Kapitel und 4. Kapitel, von Fritz Rudolph, Sportverlag Berlin 1959
