= Lamu Amatya =

First Nepalese trained–nurse (1932 – 2012)

- लामू अमात्य
- Born: Lamu Palden; 27 January 1932; Darjeeling, British India
- Died: 1 June 2012 (aged 80)
- Education: Medical College and Hospital, Kolkata
- Occupation: Nurse
- Known for: First Nepalese trained–nurse
- Spouse: Bhubaneswar Amatya
- Children: Yogeshwar Amatya

Lamu Amatya (née Palden; 27 January 1932 – 1 June 2012) was the first Nepalese trained–nurse. She received her nursing degree in 1954 and started working in 1956. In 2017, the Ministry of Health and Population of Nepal certified and declared her as the first Nepalese nurse posthumously. Her son Yogeshwar Amatya, a popular Nepalese singer and musician, accepted the certificate on her behalf.

== Early life and education ==
Amatya was born as Lamu Palden on 27 January 1932 (14 Magh 1988 BS) in Darjeeling, India. When Lamu was very young, her mother died. Her father Sirdar Karma 'Paul' Palden was a mountaineer. Palden was originally from Solukhumbu district. He was the porter and interpreter of the mountaineers George Mallory and Andrew "Sandy" Irvine during the 1924 British Mount Everest expedition. Later, Karma moved to Darjeeling, which was a major mountaineering hub at that time. After the death of Lamu's mother, Karma remarried.

Lamu was sent to Kolkata for her education, where she grew up. She received her nursing degree from Medical College and Hospital, Kolkata in 1954.

== Marriage ==
Lamu Amatya met her future husband, Bhubaneswar Amatya, in Kolkata, while she was training as a nurse. Bhubaneswar Amatya was studying dentistry in Kolkata. One day he had gone to Calcutta Medical College for his leg treatment, there he met Lamu and fell in love with her. Bhubaneswar Amatya then frequently visited her. They married in 1953. After completing her nursing degree in 1954, they returned to Nepal and she became a naturalised citizen of Nepal.

== Nursing career ==
During the time, Amatya came to Kathmandu, the maternal mortality was very high in Nepal. Indra Rajya Laxmi Shah, the wife of King Mahendra had also died during childbirth in 1950. Mahendra heard about the arrival of Amatya in Kathmandu and met her. He asked her to open a nursing school in Kathmandu. So, on 13 March 1956 (30 Falgun 2032 BS), Amatya opened the first ever nursing school in Nepal by renting a building in Chhetrapati. The Nepal Nursing Association was also established under Lamu's leadership.

== First Nepalese nurse title ==
The first Nepalese nurse title was debated for a long time between her and Uma Devi Das. On 30 April 2017 (7 Magh 2073 BS), Gagan Thapa, the then Minister of Health and Population declared Amatya as the first nurse of Nepal. Both Amatya's and Das' family had provided evidences regarding the claim to the title of first ever Nepalese nurse, and Amatya was decided based on those evidences. The title and certificate was provided to Amatya posthumously. Yogeshwar Amatya, Lamu Amatya's son received the official certificate on her behalf.

== Personal life and death ==
She died on 1 June 2012 (19 Jestha 2069 BS), due to Alzheimer's disease. Her son Yogeshwar Amatya is a popular Nepali singer.
