= Nyonno Ri =

Mountain in China

Nyönno Ri
- Location within China

Highest point
- Elevation: 6,724 m (22,060 ft)
- Prominence: 1,805 m (5,922 ft)
- Isolation: 48.65 km (30.23 mi)
- Listing: Mountains of China; Ultra
- Coordinates: 28°12′N 87°36′E

Geography
- Parent range: Sikkim-Eastern Nepal Himalayas

Climbing
- First ascent: Unclimbed

Nyönno Ri (Tibetan: ཉ་རོ་རི།) is a mountain located in the Tibet Autonomous Region, China. It is an ultra-prominent peak and is the 296th highest in Asia. It has an elevation of 6,724 metres (22,060 ft).

In 1935, the British Mount Everest Committee organised and funded the British Mount Everest reconnaissance expedition sending a team of climbers, led by Eric Shipton, to explore and evaluate possible approach routes to Mount Everest through the surrounding mountains. On June 17, 1935, part of that team led by Bill Tilman attempted to ascend "the South Peak of Nyönno Ri" (ca 6590m, not the main N summit) reaching a prominent point "several hundred feet" below "but a considerable distance" short of their target, before turning back after deciding that "any attempt to reach it would so exhaust the party that the day might end in disaster". There has been no recorded ascent of Nyönno Ri.

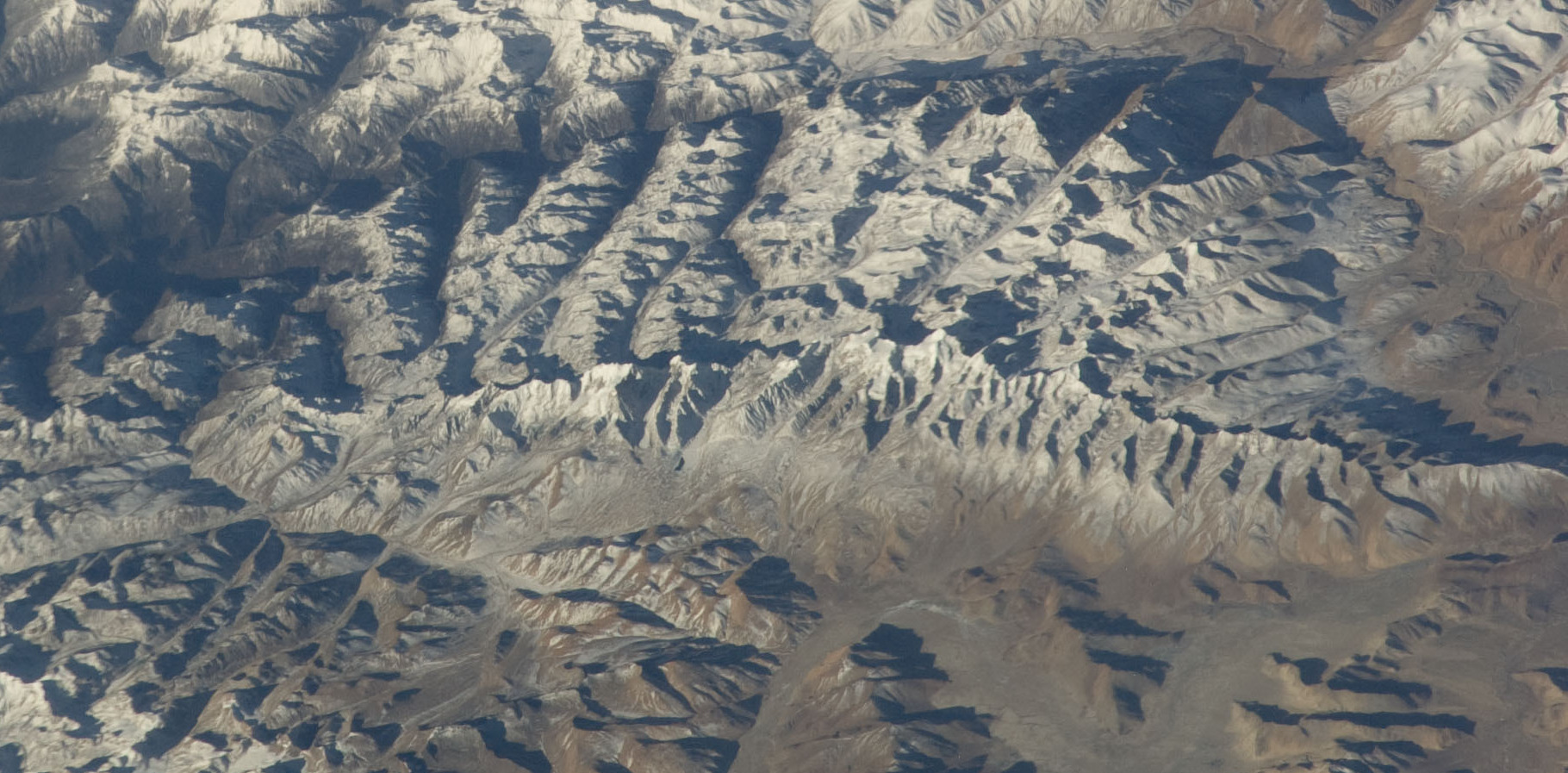
Umbak Himal with Ama Drime and Nyonno Ri summits, mountain Gyangkar Ri next to Dinggyê

== See also ==
- List of ultras of Tibet, East Asia and neighbouring areas
