= Rongbuk Glacier =

Glacier in Tibet, China

Rongbuk
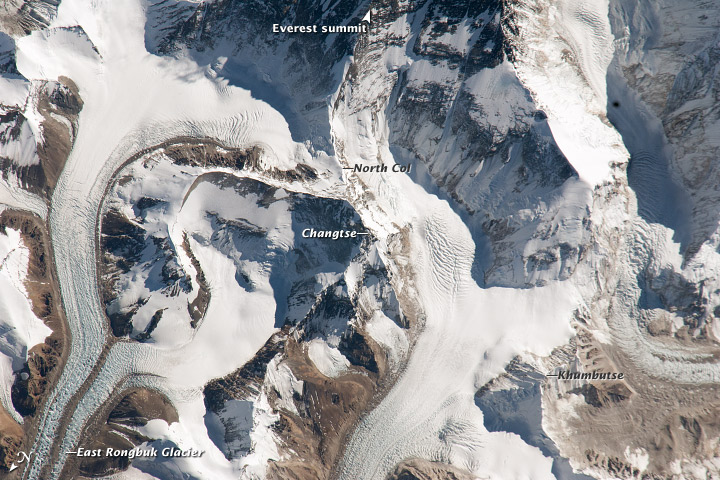
- East Rongbuk Glacier

- Location within Tibet
- Interactive map of Rongbuk
- Type: Valley glacier
- Location: Tibet
- Coordinates: 28°06′07″N 86°51′55″E
- Area: 85 km^{2} (33 mi^{2})
- Length: 22.4 km (13.9 mi)

The Rongbuk Glacier (simplified Chinese: 绒布冰川; traditional Chinese: 絨布冰川; pinyin: Róngbù Bīngchuān) is located in the Himalaya of southern Tibet. Two large tributary glaciers, the East Rongbuk Glacier and the West Rongbuk Glacier, flow into the main Rongbuk Glacier. It flows north and forms the Rongbuk Valley north of Mount Everest. The famous Rongbuk Monastery is located at the northern end of the Rongbuk valley. Mount Everest is the source of the Rongbuk Glacier and the East Rongbuk Glacier. Meltwater from the Rongbuk Glacier forms a proglacial lake at its foot.

== Location(s) ==
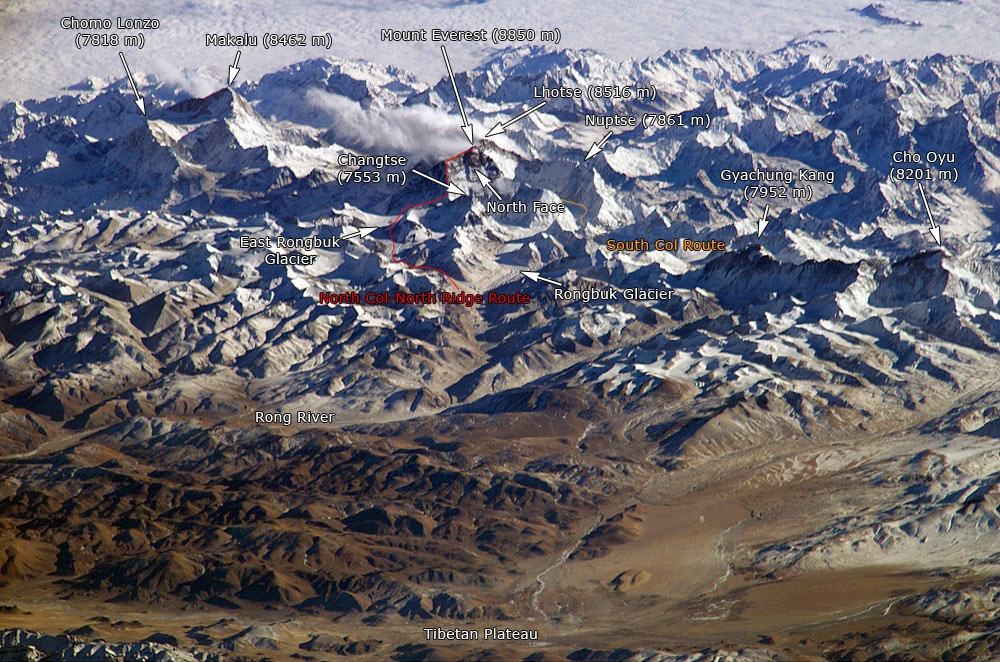

Rongbuk Glacier and Mount Everest as seen from the International Space Station.

== Exploration ==
The English climber George Mallory first explored the main Rongbuk Valley and its glacier while searching for possible routes to the summit of Mount Everest, during the first British Everest reconnaissance expedition of 1921.

On the same expedition, Oliver Wheeler first explored the East Rongbuk Glacier. His exploration below the Lhakpa La pass on August 3, 1921 led him to realise that the East Rongbuk Valley provided the key to a viable route to the summit of Everest. A few weeks later, a party consisting of George Mallory, Guy Bullock, and Oliver Wheeler explored the head of the valley via the Lhagba La pass. They became the first people to set foot on the North Col of Everest. See 1921 British Reconnaissance Expedition.

== Route to Everest ==
Everest climbing expeditions attempting the normal route from Tibet use this glacier to reach the Advanced Base Camp of Mount Everest at the upper end of the East Rongbuk Glacier. From there, climbing expeditions try to summit Everest by the North Col and the northeast ridge. Beyond its central role in Everest expeditions, the Rongbuk Glacier has received scientific attention due to its sensitivity to climate change and its role in regional hydrology of the overall Himalayan region.

== Hydrology and climate change ==
Recent studies have highlighted the essential role of the Rongbuk Glacier in downstream water quality and future meltwater runoff timing. Researchers continuously monitored meltwater runoff from the glacier for a full year and found that its mercury concentration levels were close to the global background levels and associated with suspended sediment. After the water passed through a proglacial lake, the concentrations decreased, suggesting that sedimentation reduces the downstream transport of mercury. However, the projected future increases in meltwater runoff from the Rongbuk Glacier and the overall Himalayan glacier system could lead to an overall increase in mercury downstream export, as expanding proglacial lakes may both trap mercury and, if they outburst, suddenly release downstream high levels of mercury stored in lake waters and sediments.

Since 2007, American mountaineer and film-maker David Breashears has been chronicling the rapid disappearance of the Rongbuk glacier due to global climate change. Breashears has retraced the steps of Mallory's 1921 expedition, revealing a significant loss of ice mass across the West, Main and East Rongbuk Glaciers. In partnership with Asia Society and MediaStorm, Breashears' GlacierWorks has made the photos available online. In 80 years, the Rongbuk has shrunk by more than 300 vertical feet across the entire glacier, approximately the height of the Statue of Liberty.

By 2100, the Tibetan Plateau is expected to be around 5 °C warmer than it is today, and precipitation will increase by around 25 mm/day. As the Rongbuk Glacier continues to retreat at an increasing rate due to the warming global climate over the next decades, the increase in meltwater influx will cause the Rongbuk glacial lake expand extensively. This makes the Rongbuk glacial lake the most vulnerable and dangerous lake in the Everest region of the Himalaya for glacial lake outburst floods in the future, which will put downstream communities and population at danger.

Modeling of the East Rongbuk Glacier also suggests that the glacier will experience continued ice mass loss through the 21st century, with peak meltwater runoff projected to occur 2030 under a lower-emissions Shared Socioeconomic Pathways scenario and around 2060 under higher-emissions scenarios.

== Image gallery ==
Recent glacial animation, Mount Everest at the top right.

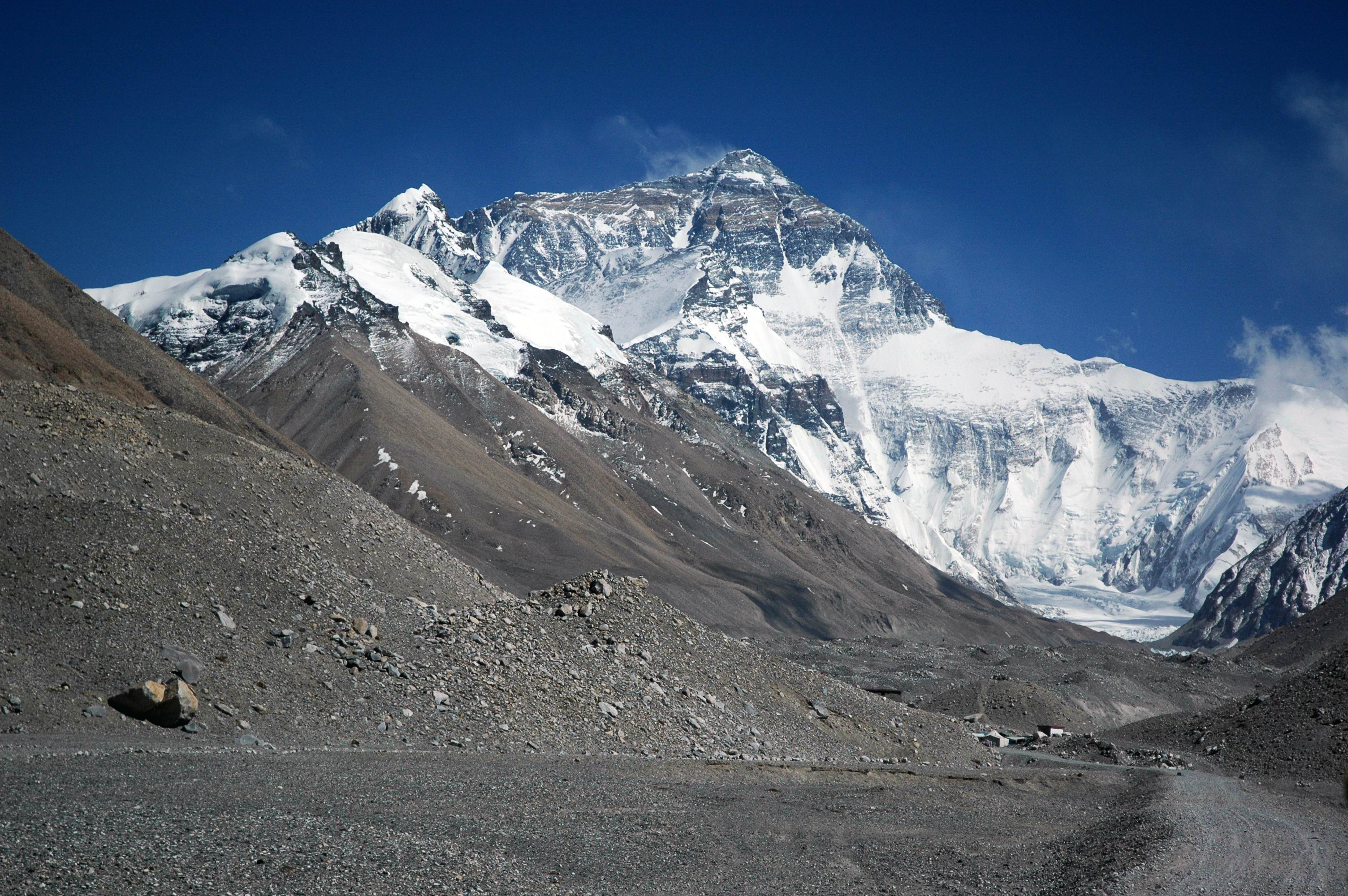
View of Mount Everest from Rongbuk Valley, near foot/terminus of Rongbuk Glacier.

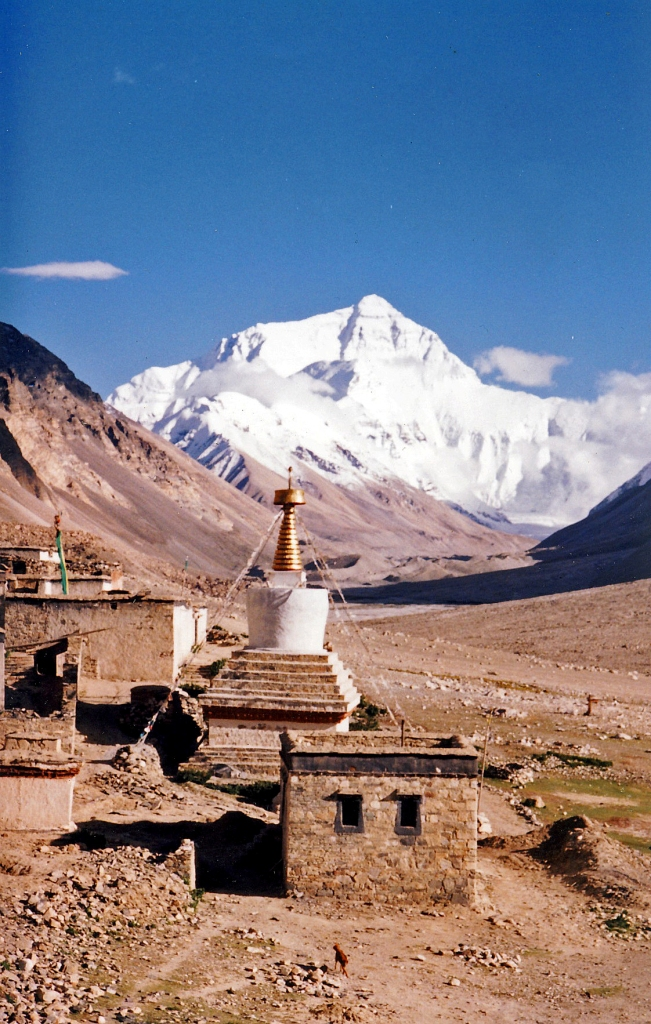
View of Mount Everest and Rongbuk Monastery.

== See also ==
- Retreat of glaciers since 1850
- Rongbuk Monastery
- List of glaciers
