= Rongbuk Monastery =

Tibetan Buddhist monastery in Basum, Tibet, China

- Tibetan transcription(s); Tibetan: རྫ་རོང་ཕུ་དགོན་ Wylie transliteration: rdza rong phu dgon
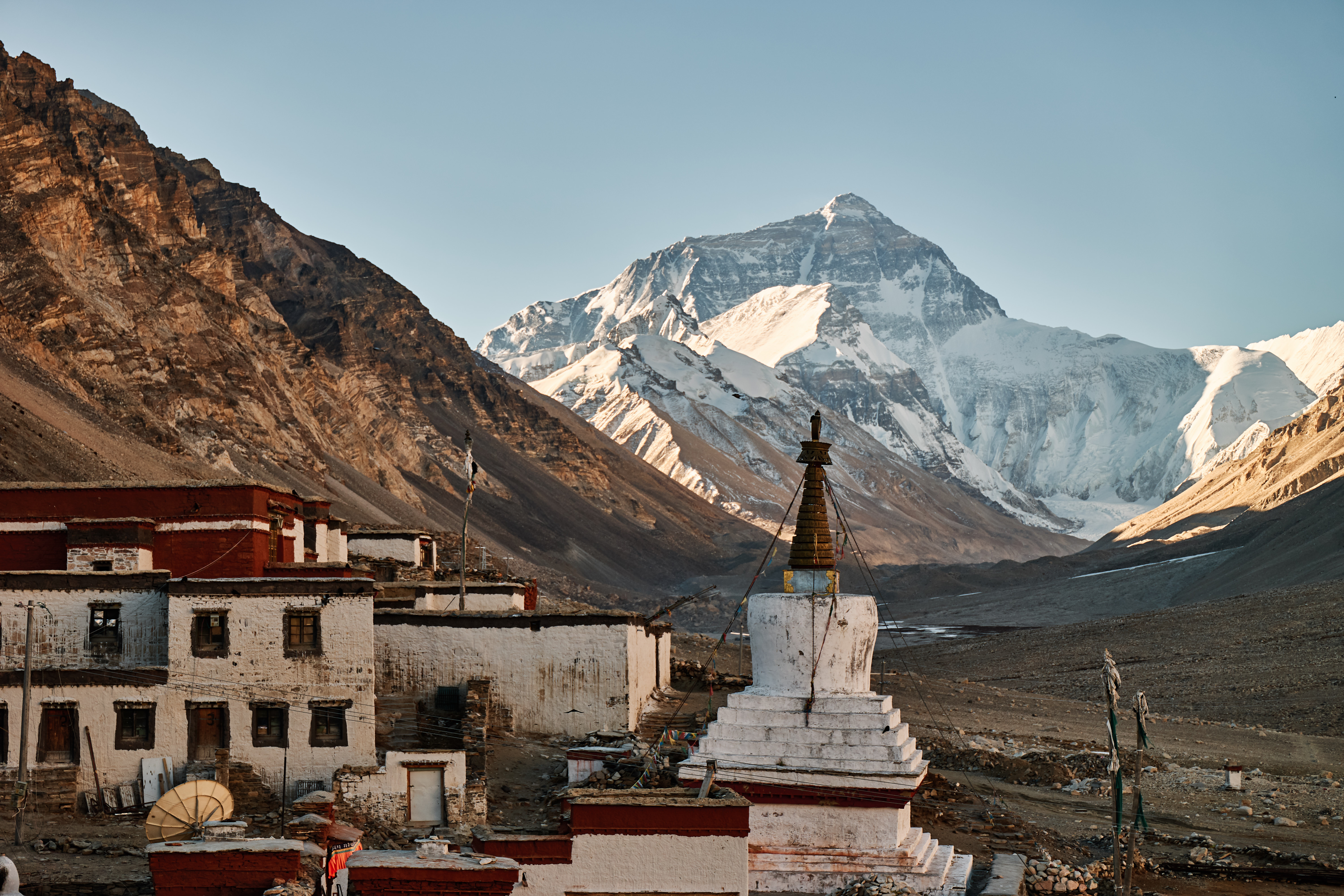
- Mount Everest as seen from the Rongbuk Monastery

- Location within Tibet Autonomous Region

Religion
- Affiliation: Tibetan Buddhism
- Sect: Nyingma

Location
- Location: Basum Township
- Country: China
- Coordinates: 28°11′47″N 86°49′40″E

Architecture
- Founder: Ngawang Tenzin Norbu
- Established: 1902; 124 years ago

Rongbuk Monastery (Note: Also named Tibetan: རྫ་རོང་ཕུ་དགོན་, Wylie: rdza rong phu dgon; other spellings include Rongpu, Rongphu, Rongphuk and Rong sbug (simplified Chinese: 绒布寺; traditional Chinese: 絨布寺; pinyin: Róngbù Sì)), also known as Dzarongpu or Dzarong) is a Tibetan Buddhist monastery of the Nyingma sect in Basum Township, Dingri County, in Shigatse Prefecture of Tibet.

== Location ==
Rongbuk Monastery lies near the base of the north side of Mount Everest at 4,980 metres (16,340 ft) above sea level, at the end of the Dzakar Chu valley. For Sherpas living on the south slopes of Everest in the Khumbu region of Nepal, Rongbuk Monastery was an important pilgrimage site, accessed in a few days' travel across the Himalaya through the Nangpa La. The monastery was also regularly visited by the early expeditions to Mount Everest in the 1920s and 1930s after a five-week journey from Darjeeling in the Indian foothills of the Himalaya. Most past and current expeditions attempting to summit Mount Everest from the north, Tibetan, side establish their Base Camp near the tongue of Rongbuk Glacier about 8 km (5 mi) south of the Monastery. The 1922 black and white silent film "Climbing Mt. Everest" includes a lengthy sequence showing the Rongbuk Lama, the monastery buildings and ritual dancing (for around 20 minutes, starting 35 minutes into the film).

Today, the monastery is accessible by road after a two- to three-hour drive from the Friendship Highway from either Shelkar (New Tingri) or Old Tingri. From Rongbuk Monastery, there are dramatic views of the north face of Mount Everest, and one of the first British explorers to see it, John Noel, described it: "Some colossal architect, who built with peaks and valleys, seemed here to have wrought a dramatic prodigy—a hall of grandeur that led to the mountain."

== Architecture ==
In front of the monastery, there is a large, round, terraced chorten containing a reliquary.

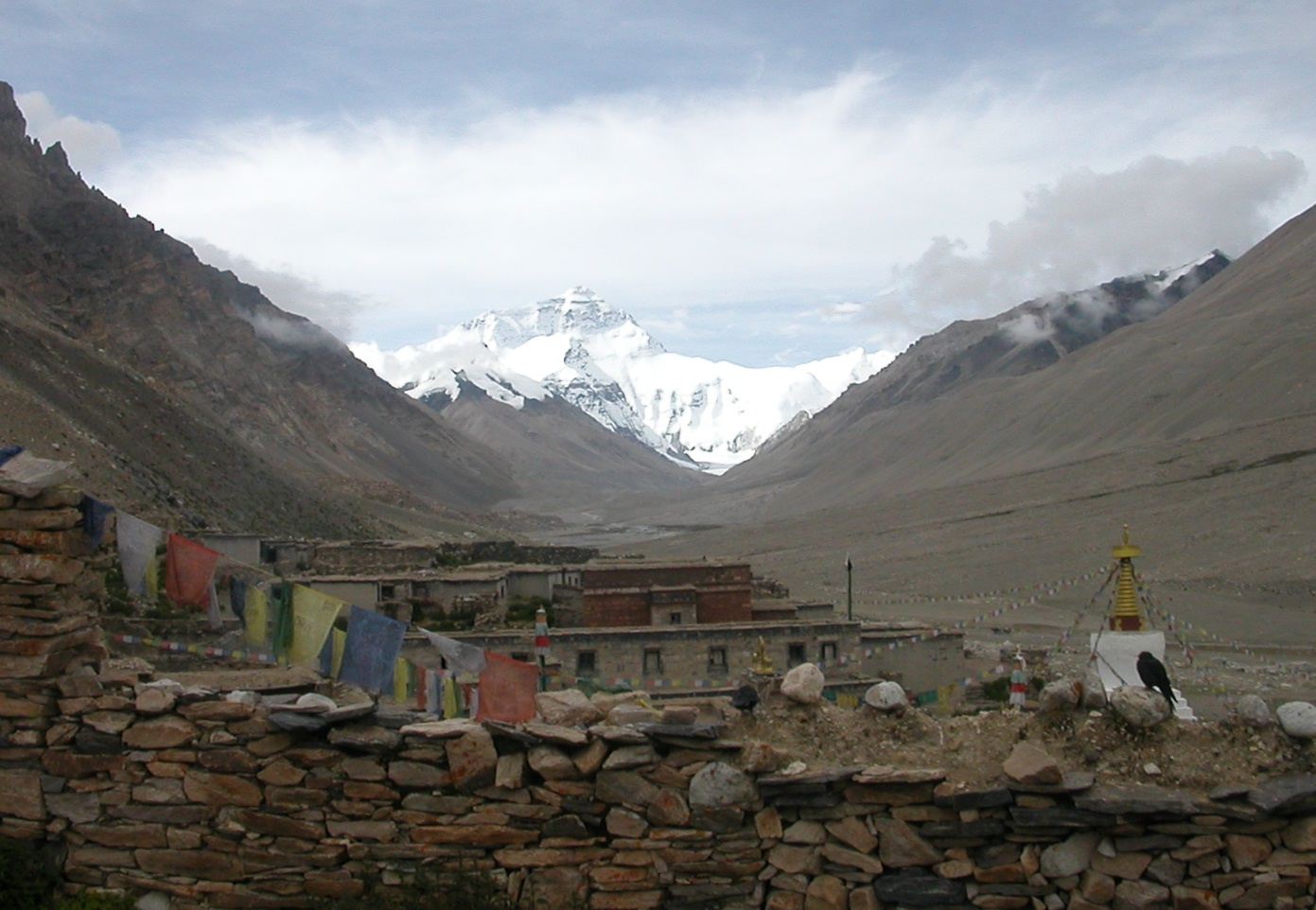
Rongbuk monastery in August 2005, with North Face of Mount Everest

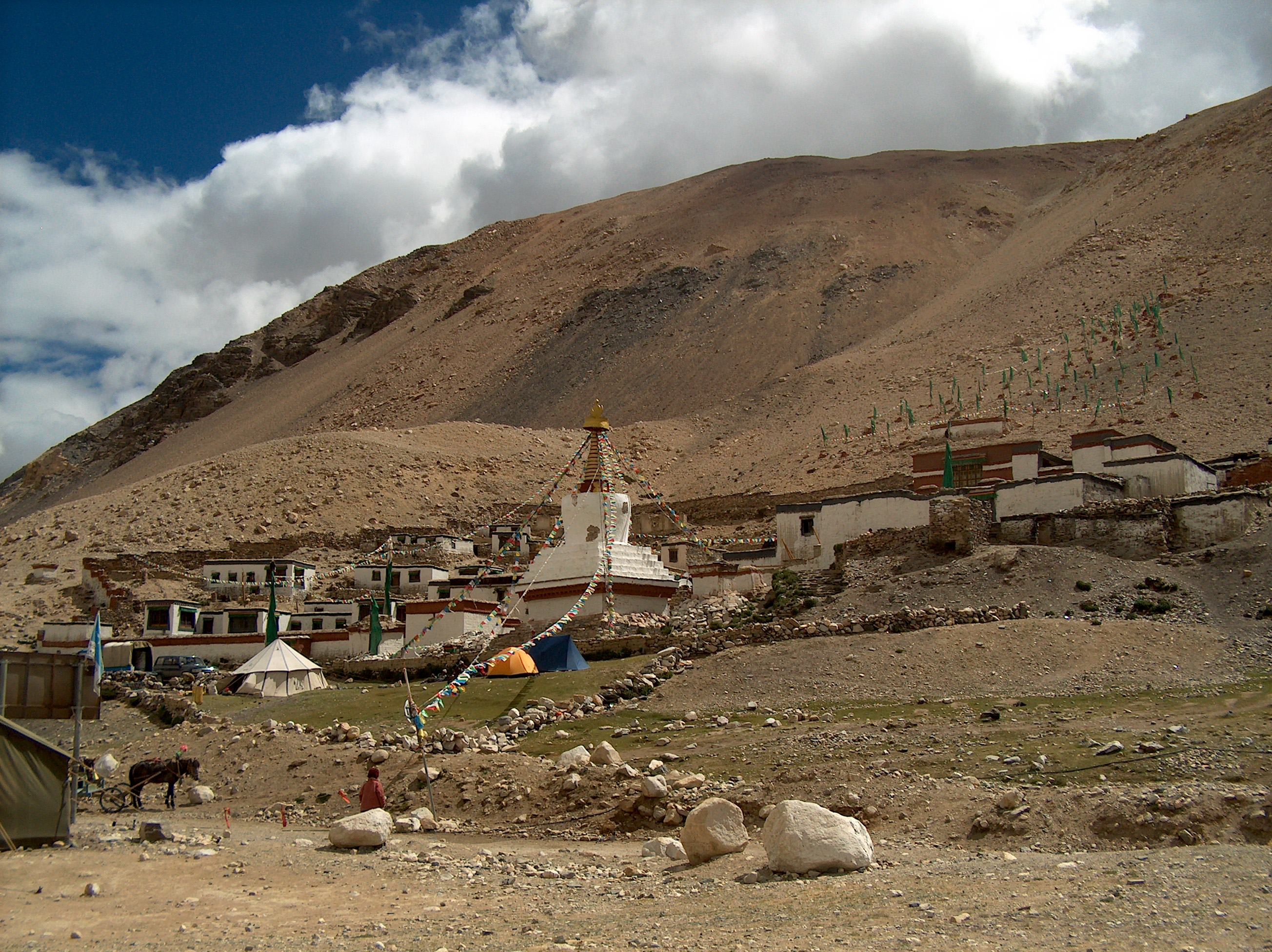
chorten in Rongbuk

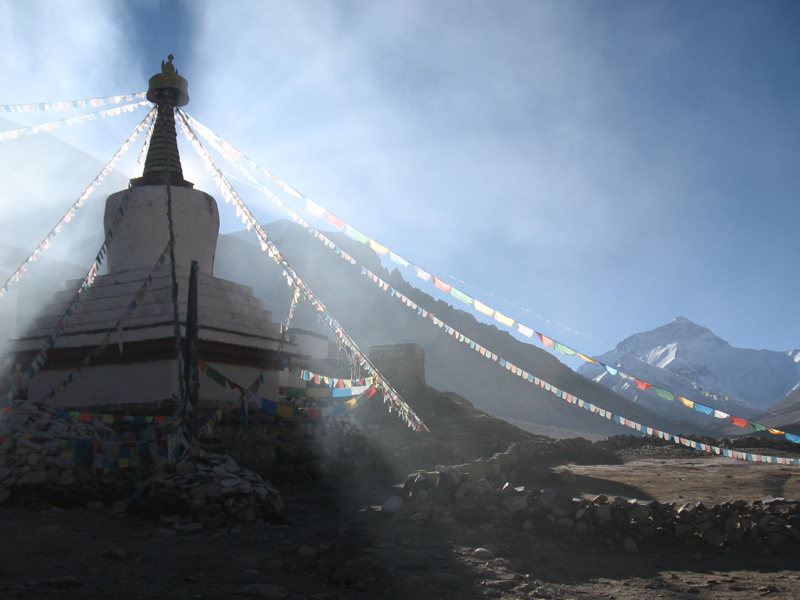
Chorten with prayer flags and the North Face of Mount Everest

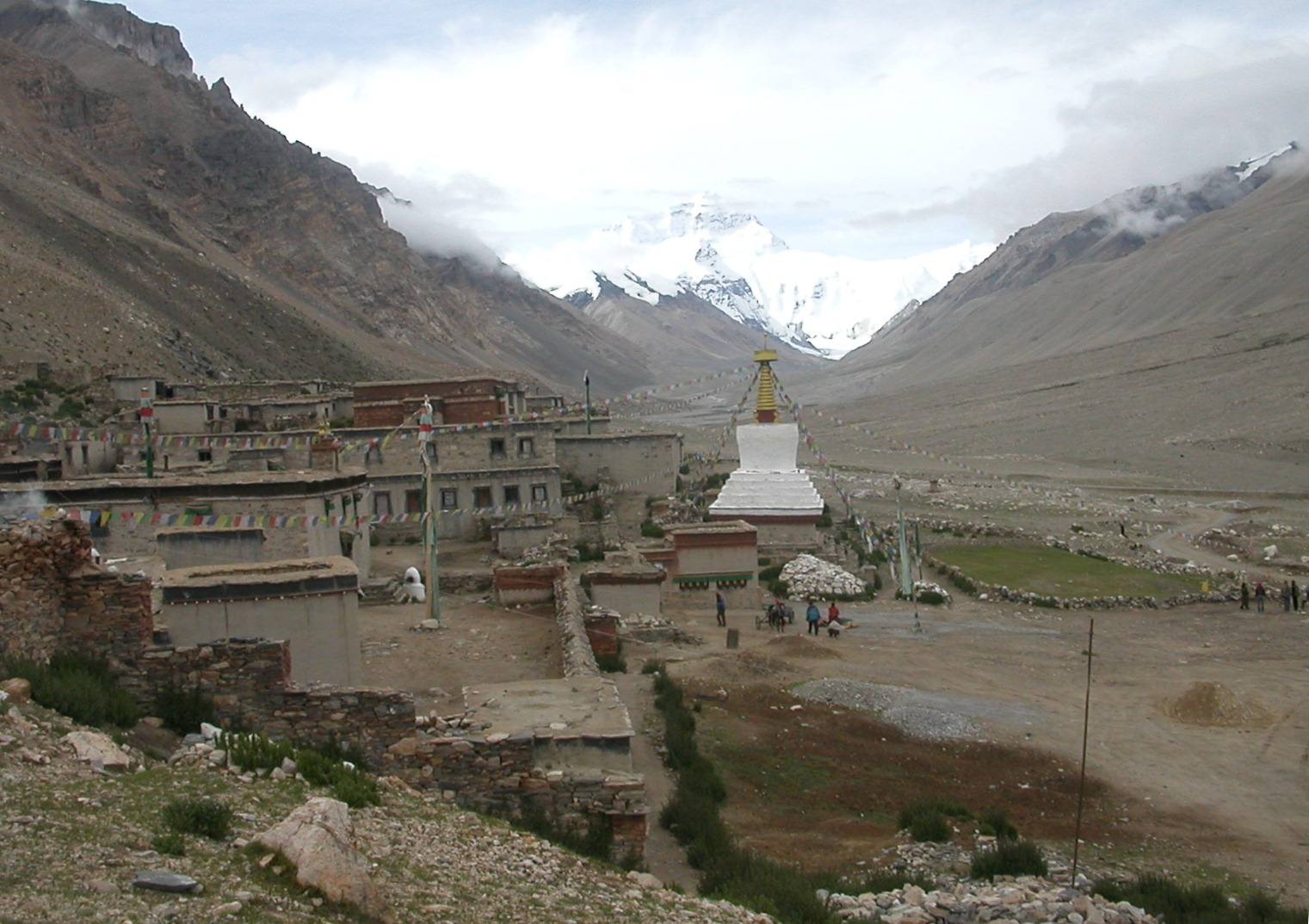
Rongbuk monastery in August 2005, Mount Everest in the background

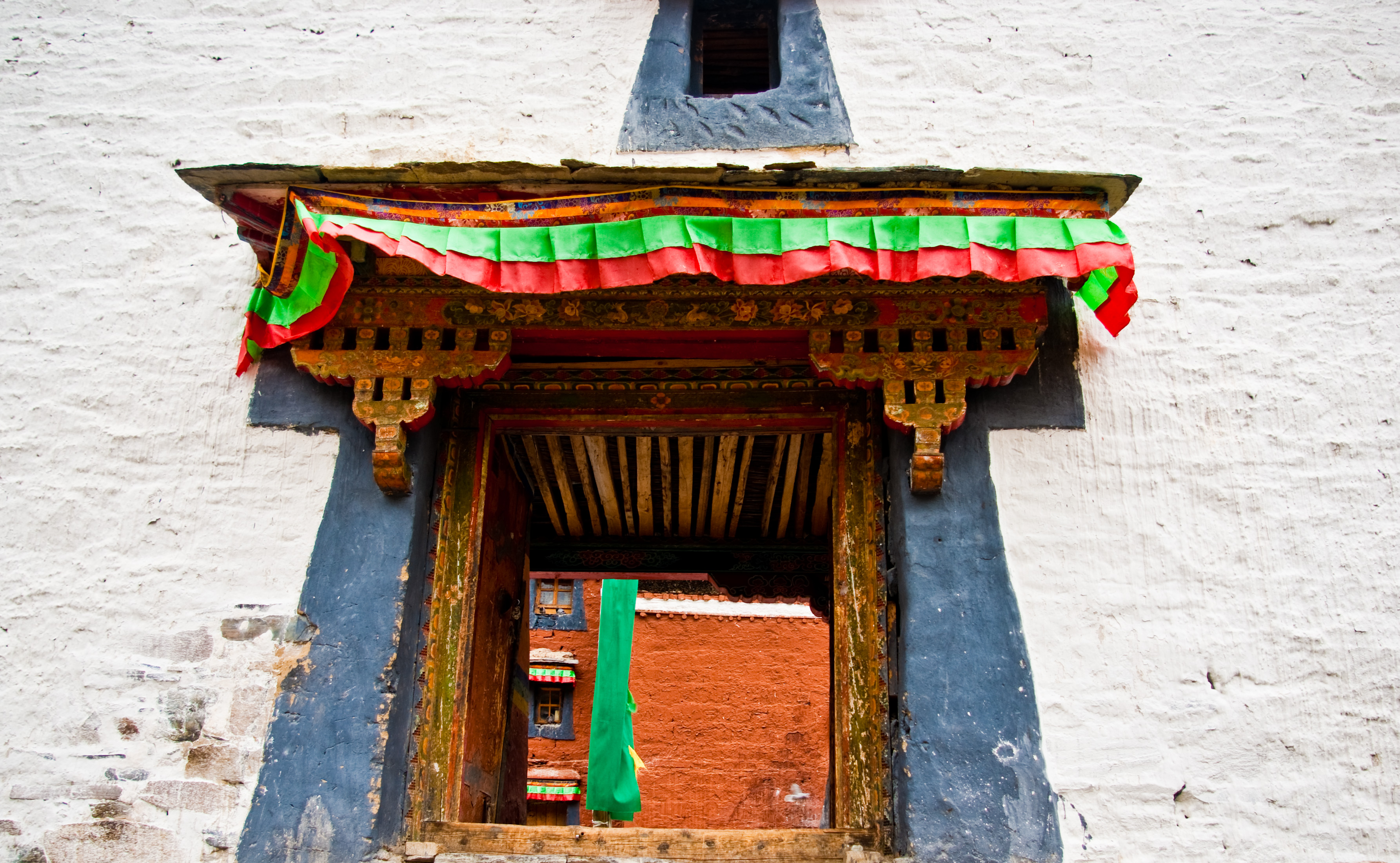
Monastery arch

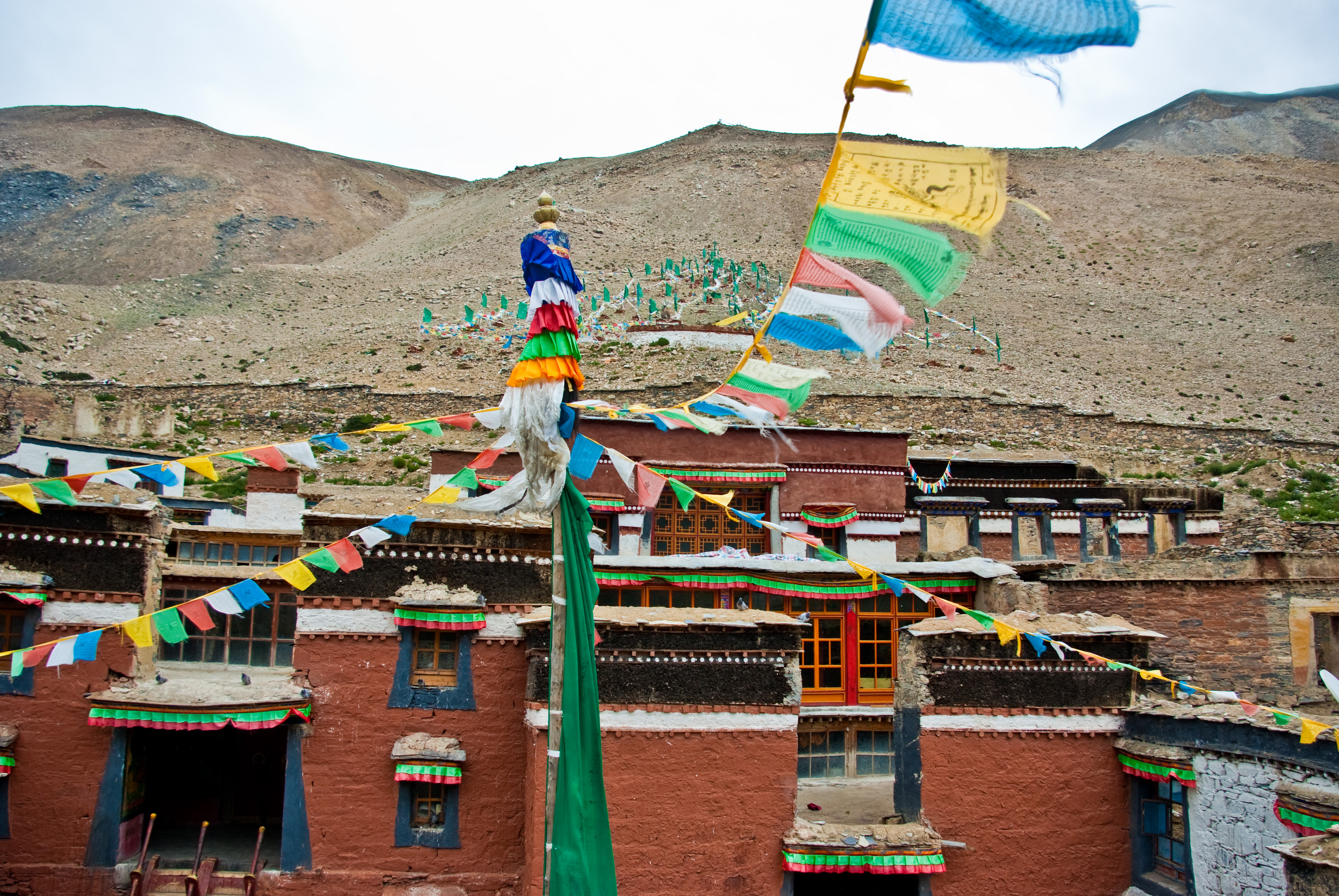

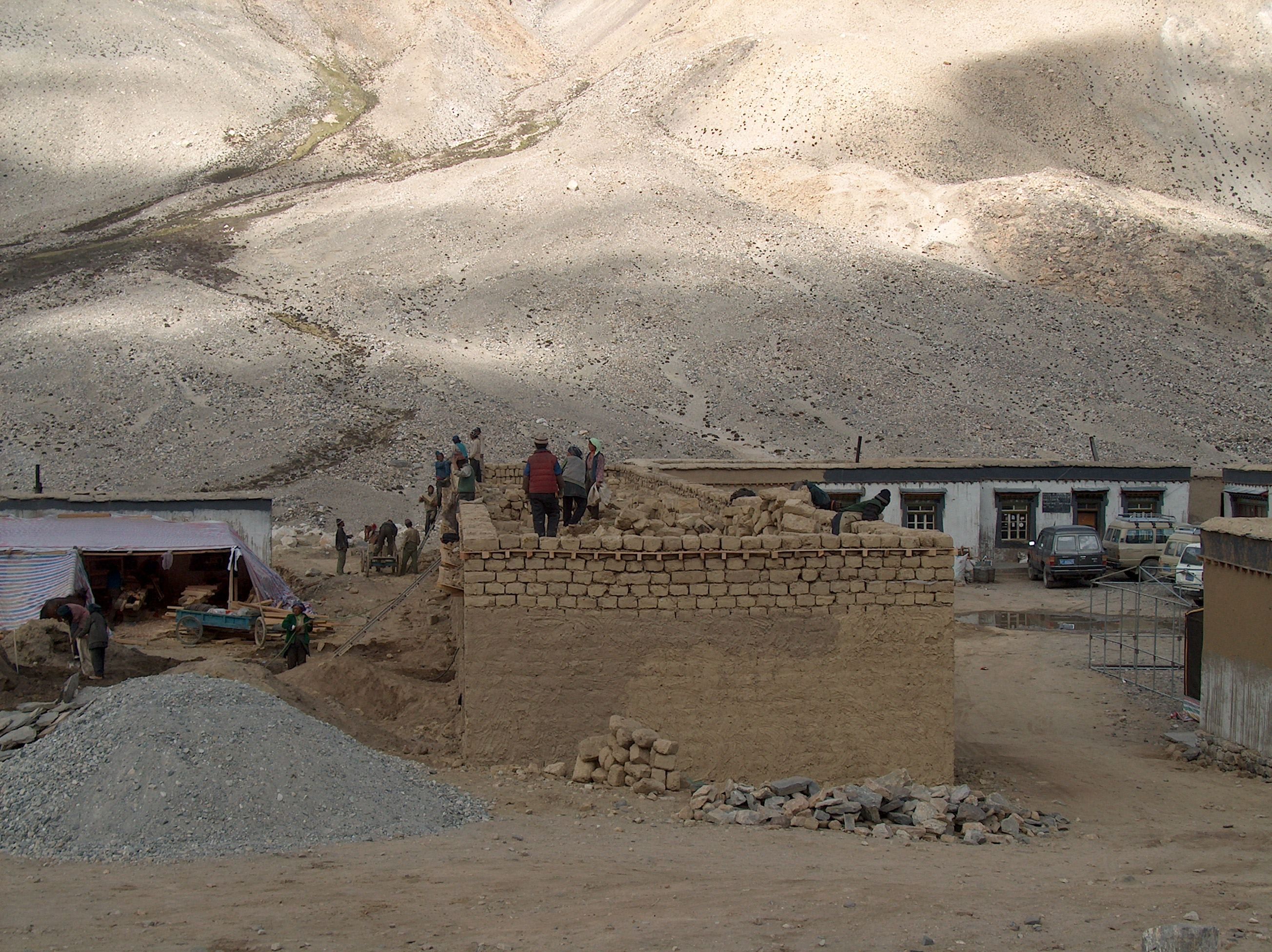
Building construction with stone and clay

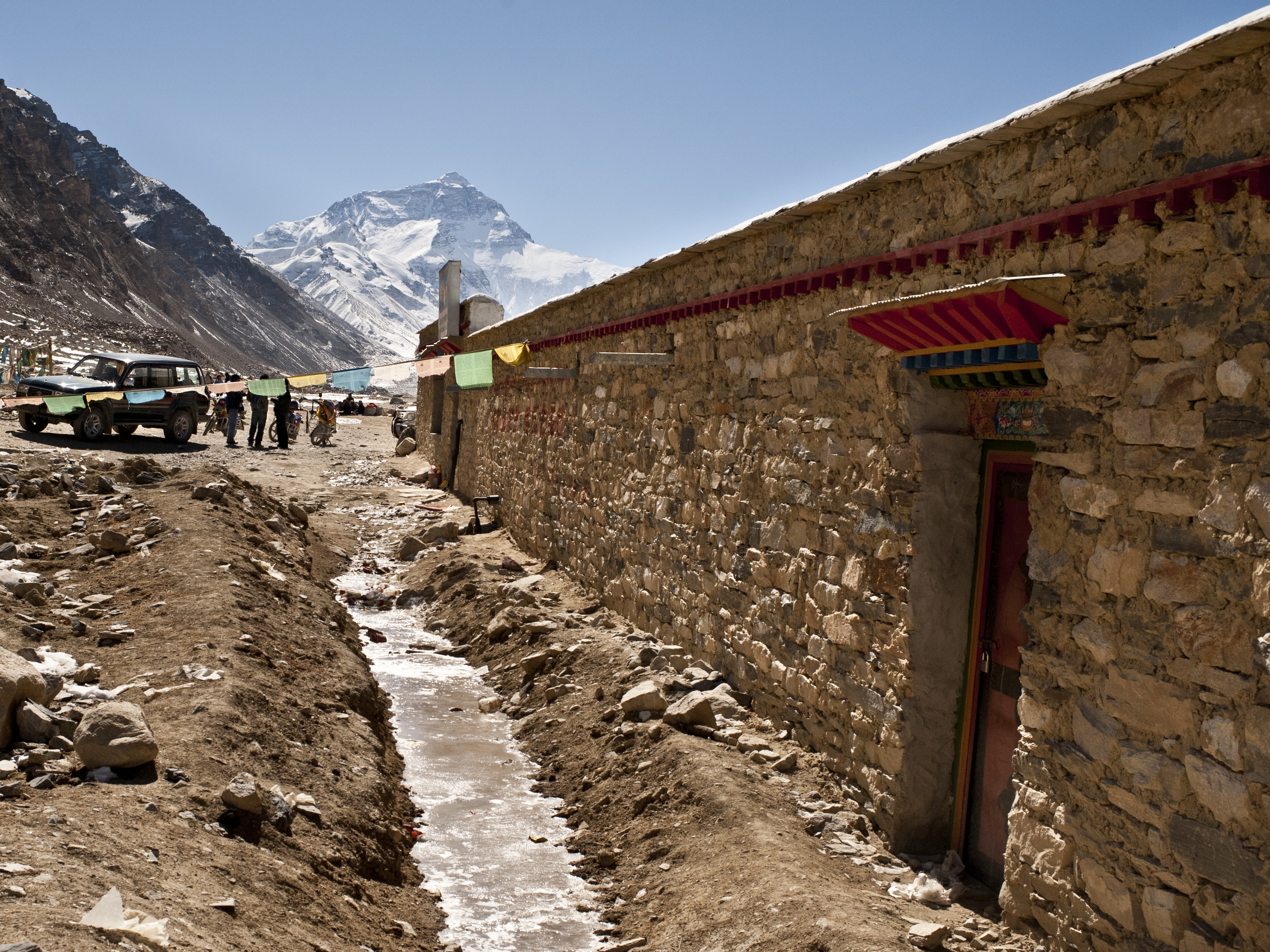
Stone buildings

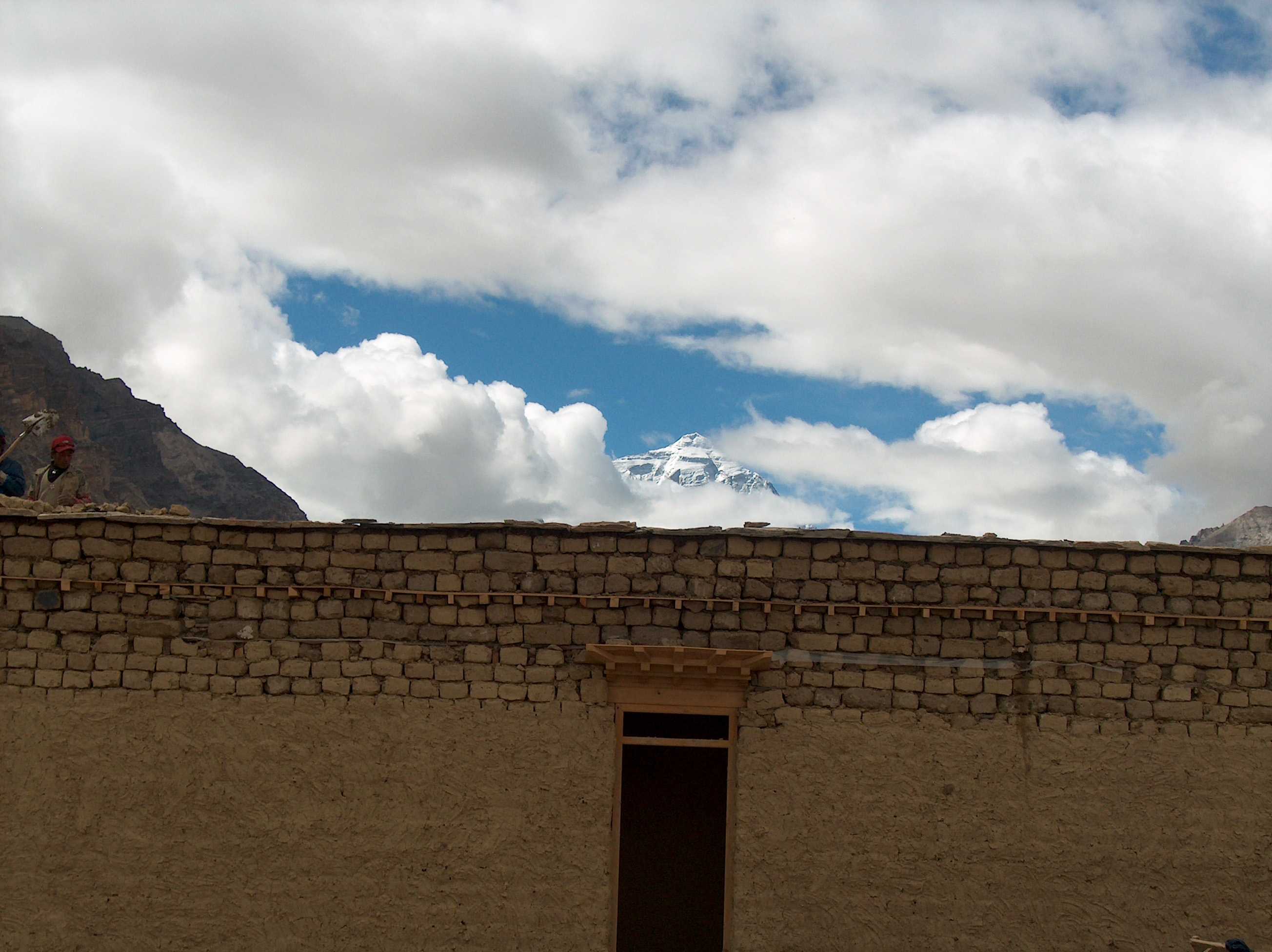

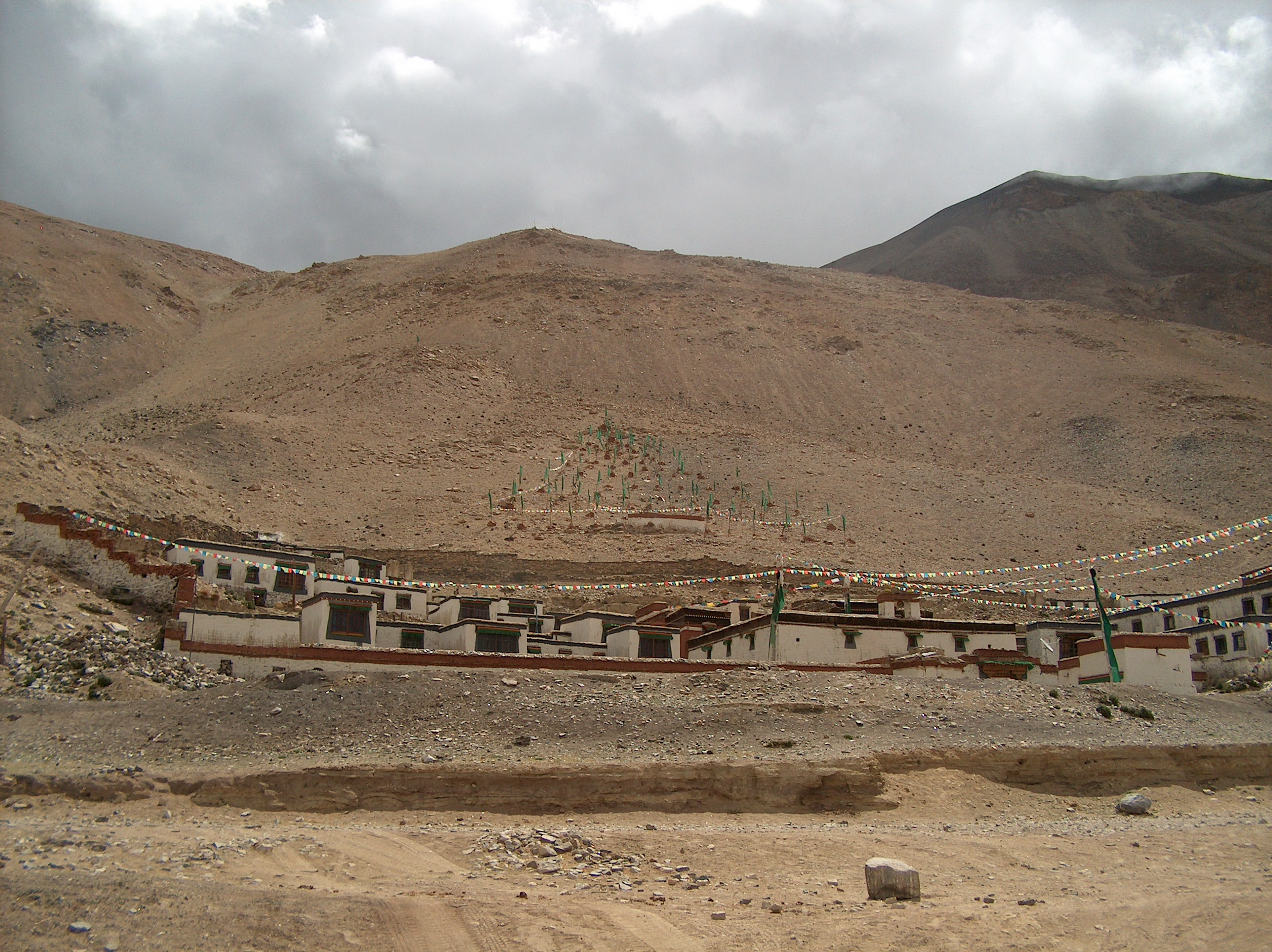

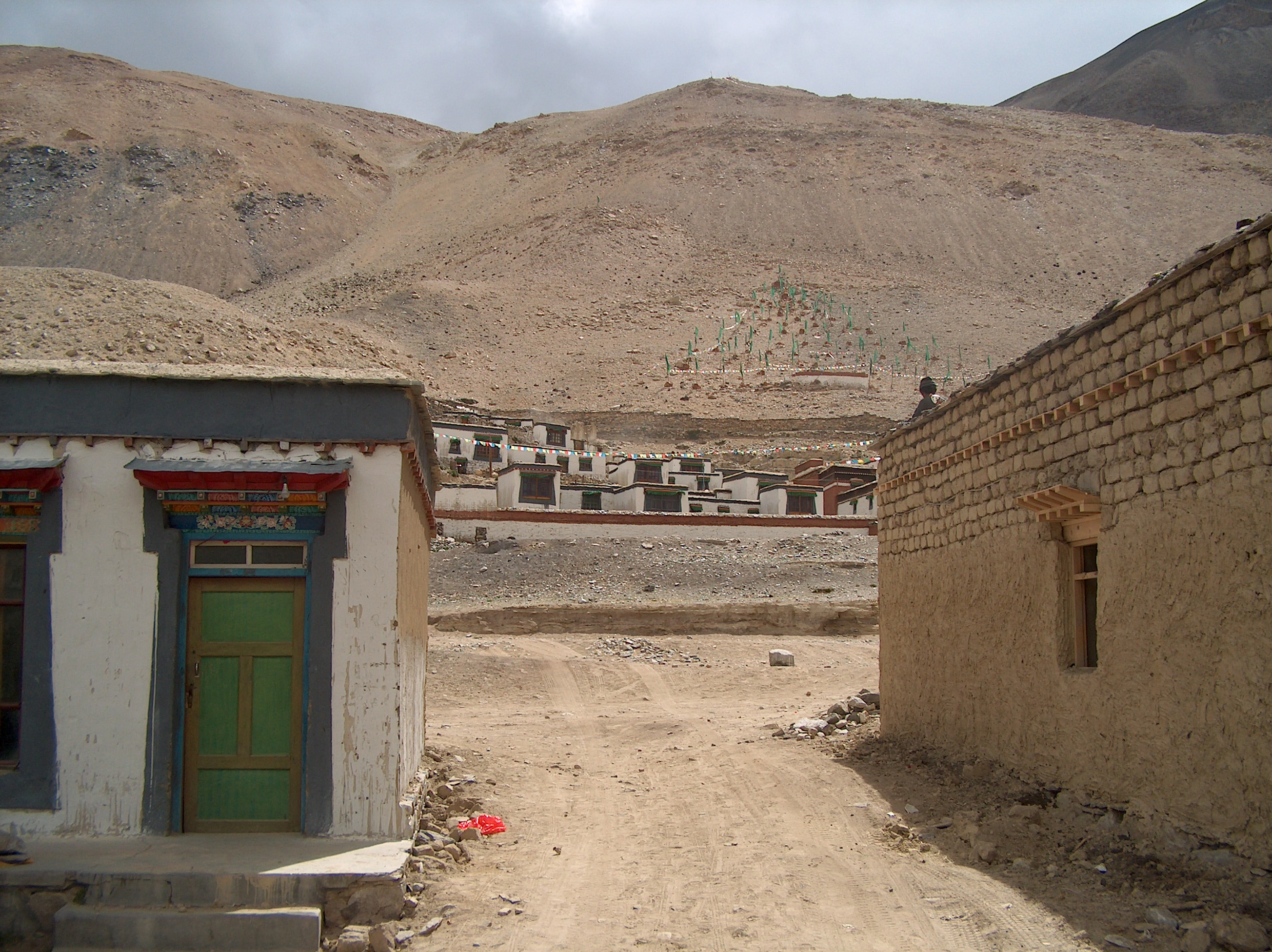

== History, religious and cultural significance ==
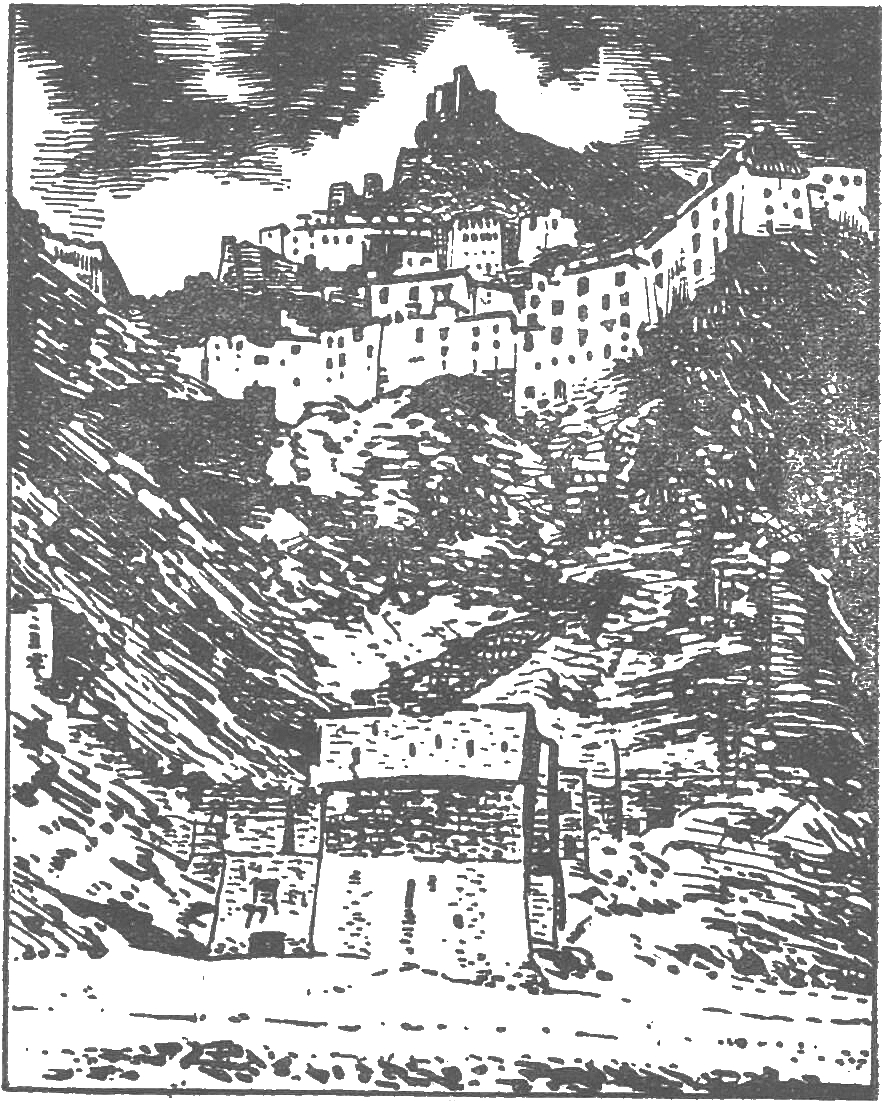
Rongbuk Monastery at 1926

Rongbuk Monastery was founded in 1902 by the Nyingmapa Lama Ngawang Tenzin Norbu in an area of meditation huts and caves that had been in use by communities of nuns since the 18th century. Hermitage meditation caves dot the cliff walls all around the monastery complex and up and down the valley. Mani stone walls, carved with sacred syllables and prayers, line the paths.

The founding Rongbuk Lama, also known as Zatul Rinpoche, was much respected by the Tibetans. Even though the Rongbuk Lama viewed the early climbers as "heretics," he gave them his protection and supplied them with meat and tea while also praying for their conversion. It was the Rongbuk Lama who gave Namgyal Wangdi the name Ngawang Tenzin Norbu, or Tenzing Norgay, as a young child.

In previous times, the Monastery became very active with Buddhist teachings at certain times of the year. It was, and is, the destination of special Buddhist pilgrimages where annual ceremonies are held for spectators coming from as far away as Nepal and Mongolia. These ceremonies were shared with satellite monasteries across the Himalaya also founded by the Rongbuk Lama. These ceremonies continue to this day, notably at the Sherpa Monastery at Tengboche.

Rongbuk Monastery was completely destroyed by the excesses of China's Cultural Revolution (1966–1976) by 1974, and was left in ruins for several years, as recorded by photo-journalist Galen Rowell in 1981.

The monastery's vast treasury of books and costumes, which had been taken for safekeeping to Tengboche, was lost in a 1989 fire.

Since 1983 renovation work has been carried out and some of the new murals are reportedly excellent. Adjacent to the monastery there is a basic guesthouse and small but cosy restaurant.

According to Michael Palin, it now houses thirty Buddhist monks and thirty nuns, but another source reports that locals say there are only about 20 nuns and 10 monks, although previously there were about 500 monks and nuns living here.

In 2011, Rongbuk Monastery was ranked at the top of CNN's 'Great Places to be a Recluse'.

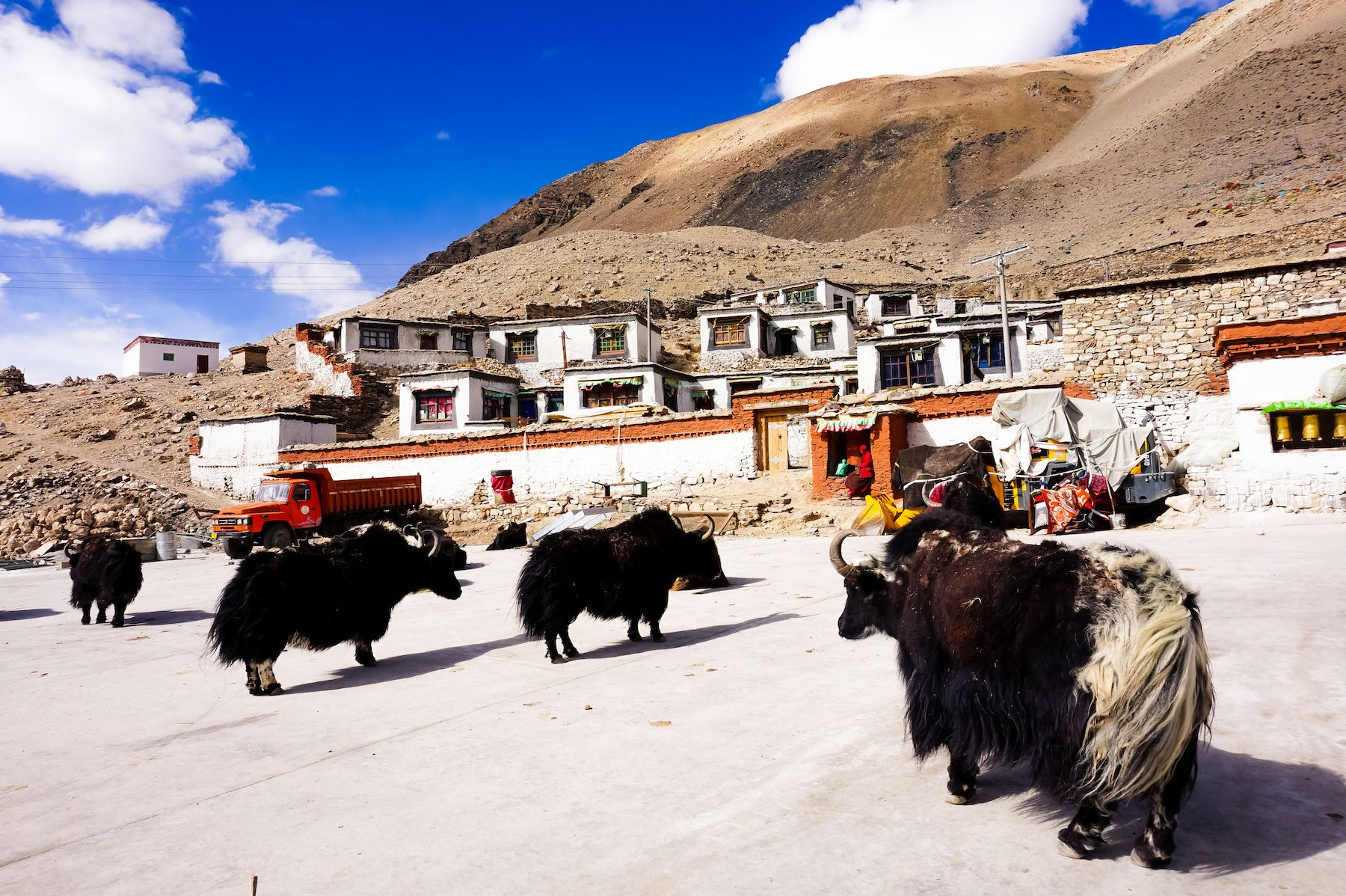
A view of the modest Rongbuk Monastery with yaks in the foreground

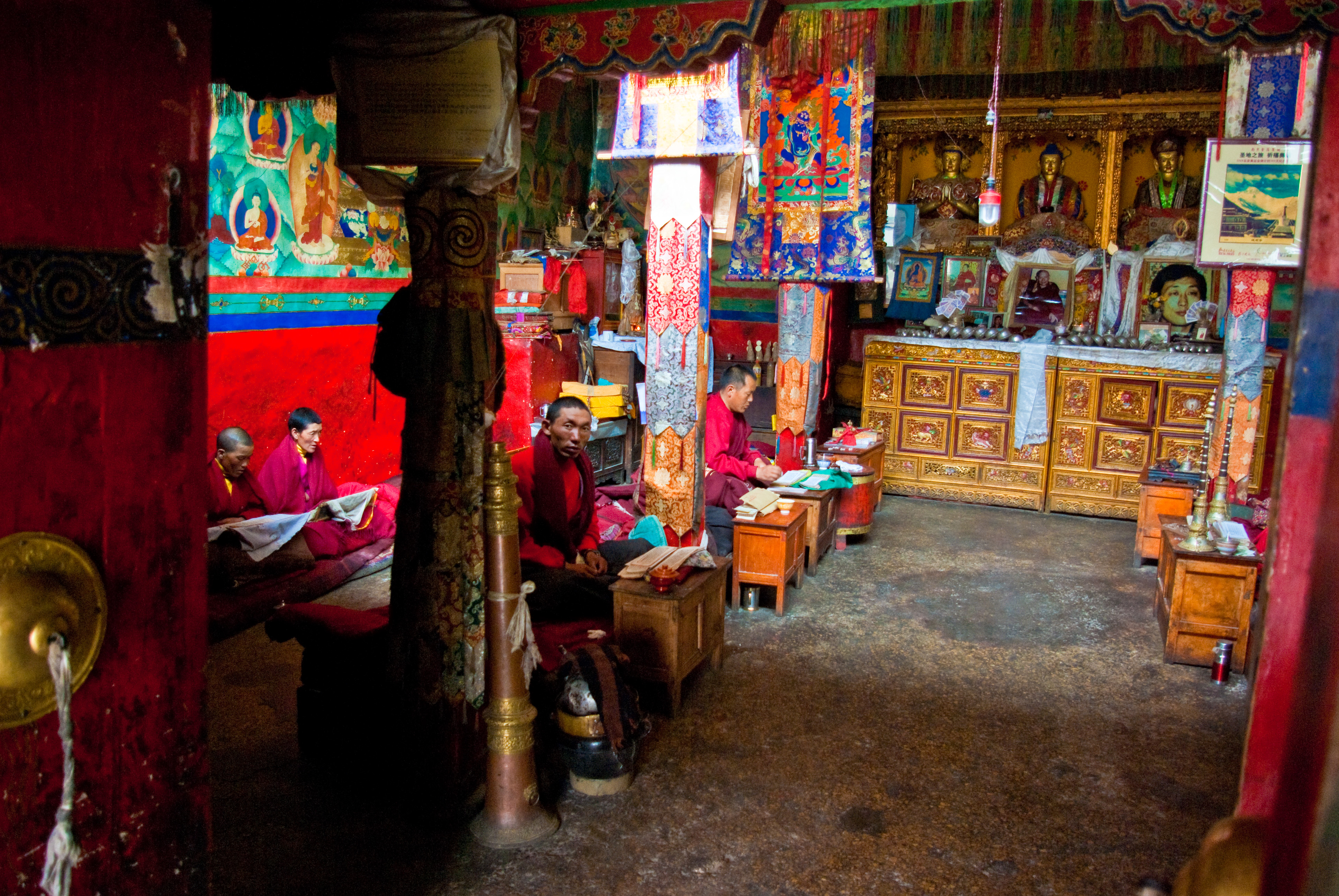
Monks in Rongbuk Monastery

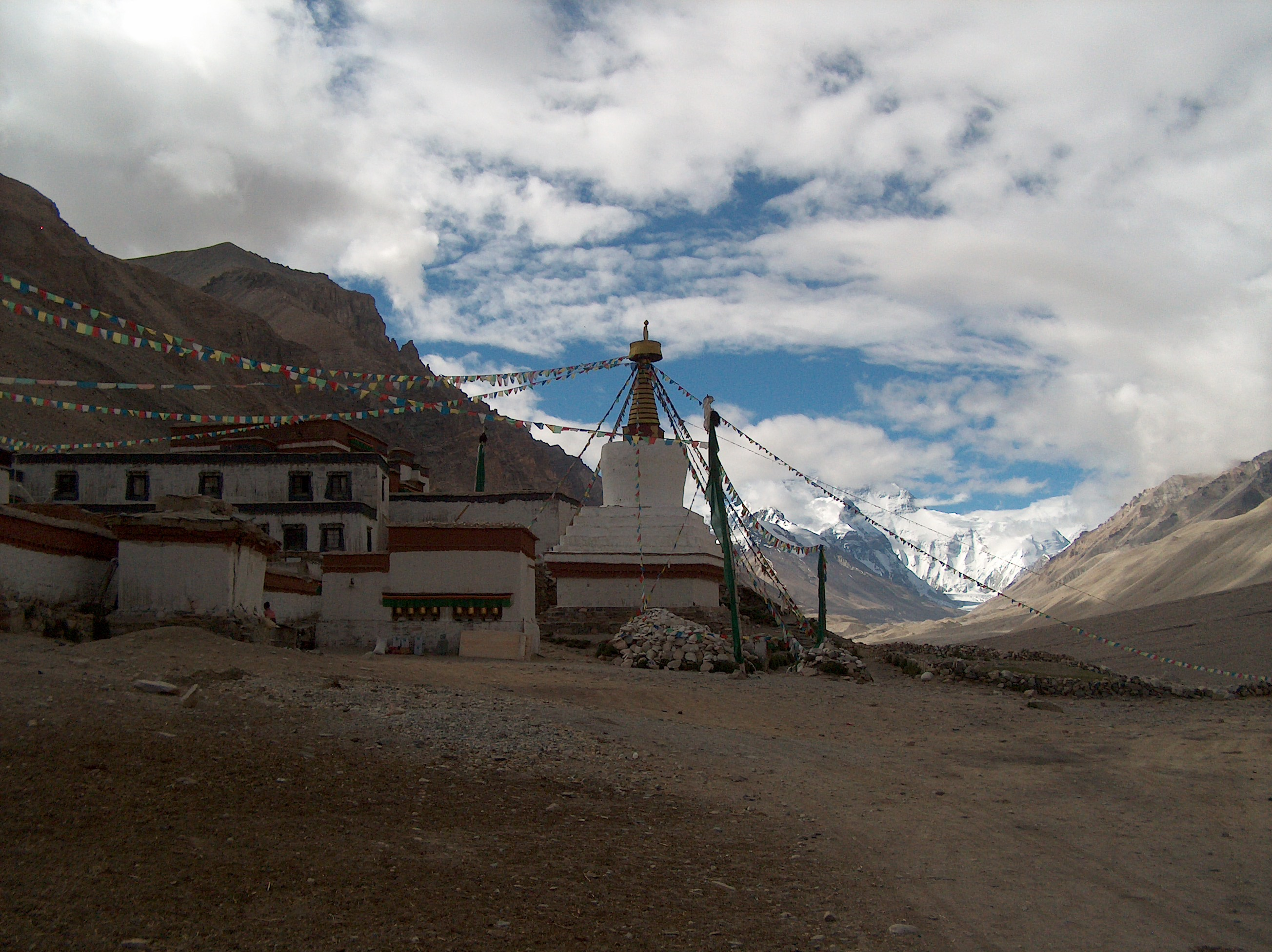
Rongbuk Monastery Near Basecamp

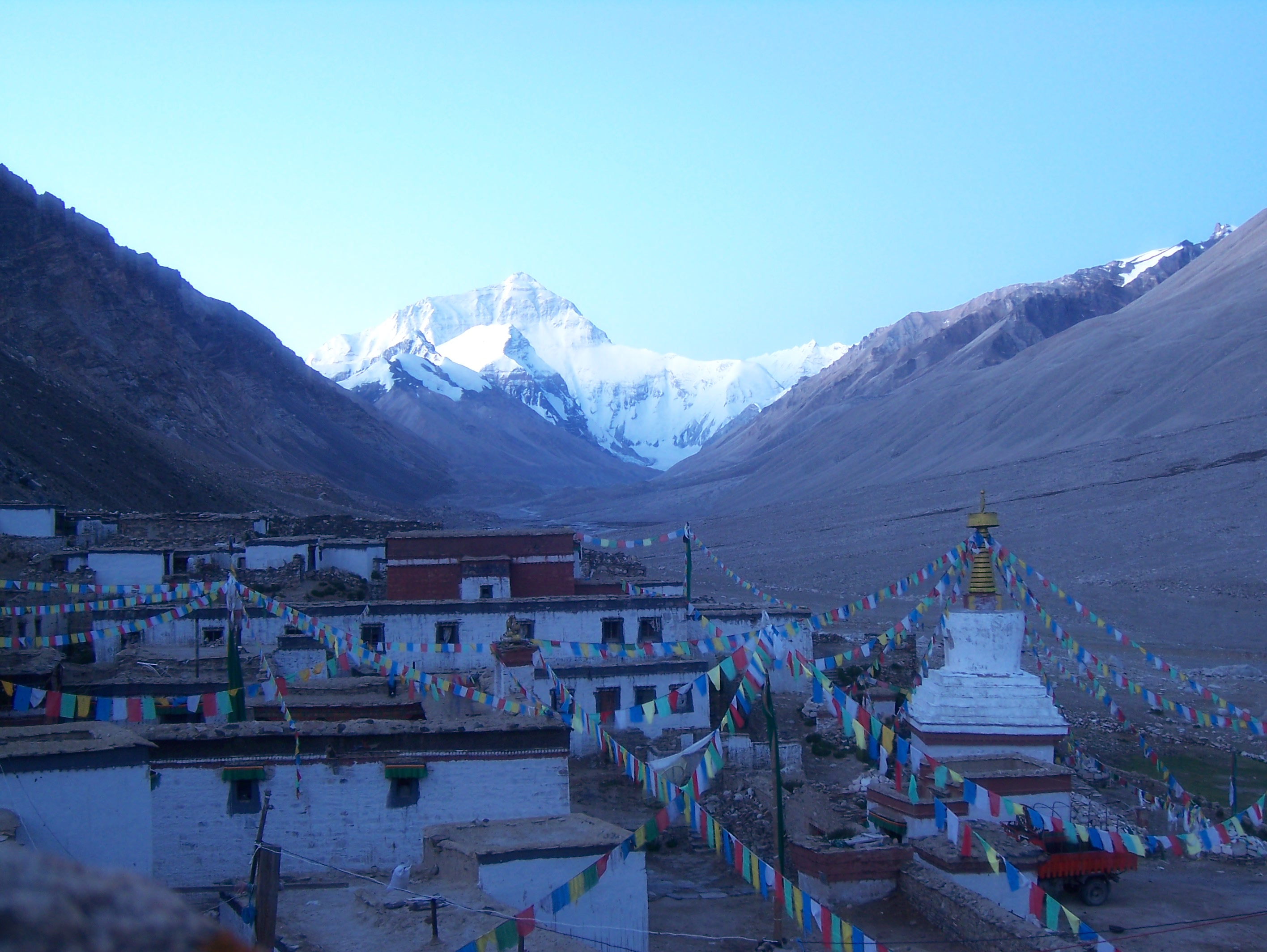
view of Mount Everest
