= North Col =

Mountain pass in the Himalayas

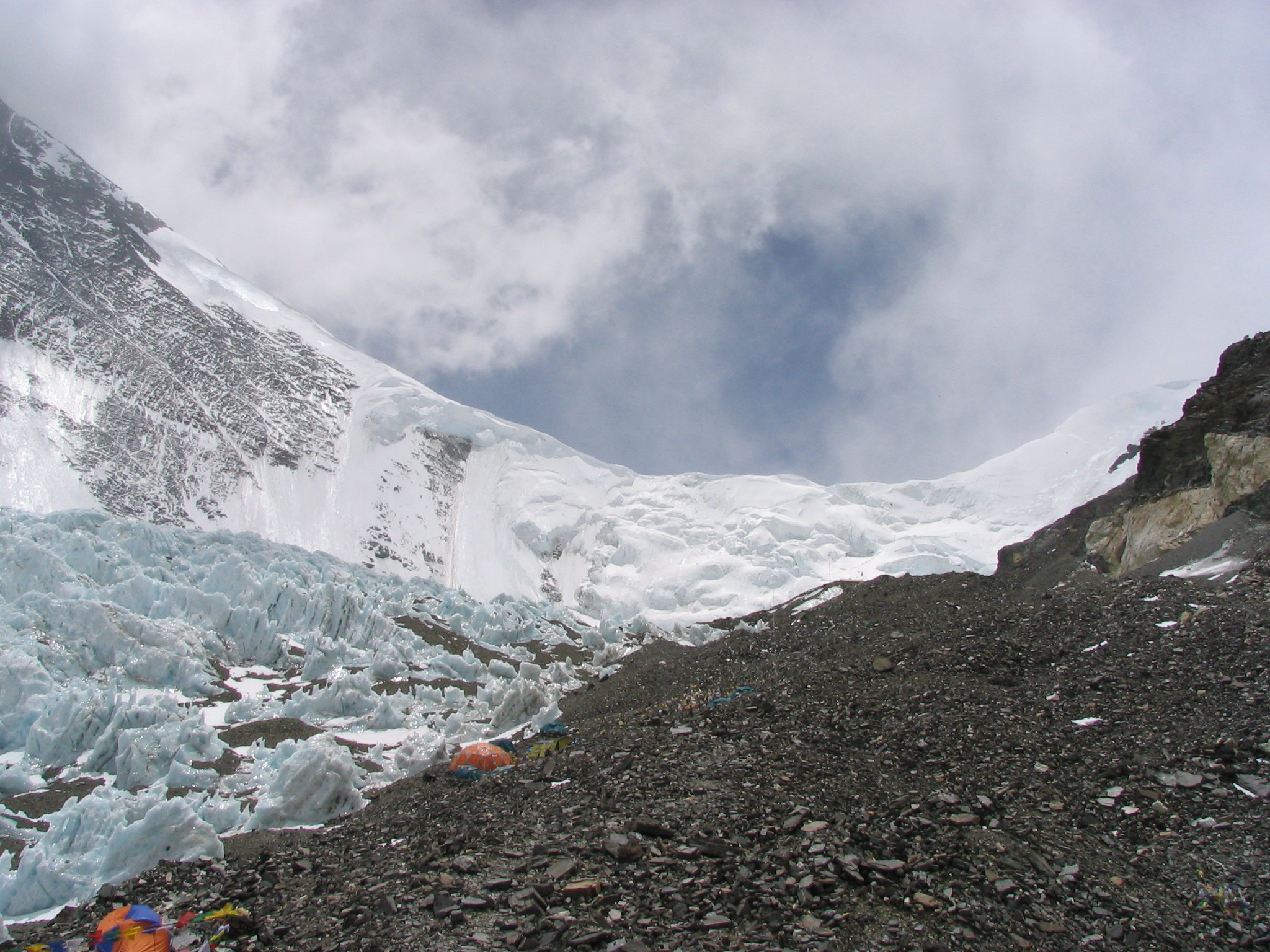
- Mount Everest. The North Col is the lowest point of the snowy ridge in the middle.

- Location within Nepal Location within Tibet
- Elevation: 7,020 metres (23,030 ft)
- Traversed by: George Mallory, Edward Oliver Wheeler and Guy Bullock (1921)

Third Approach
- Location: China (Tibet)
- Range: Mahalangur Himal
- Coordinates: 28°00′57″N 86°55′30″E

The North Col (Chinese: 北坳; pinyin: Běi Ào; Tibetan: Chang La) refers to the sharp-edged col carved by glaciers in the ridge connecting Mount Everest and Changtse in Tibet. It forms the head of the East Rongbuk Glacier.

When climbers attempt to climb Everest via the North Ridge (Tibet), the first camp on the mountain itself (traditional Camp IV, modern Camp I) is established on the North Col. From this point at approximately 7,020 metres (23,030 ft) above sea level, climbers ascend the North Ridge to reach a series of progressively higher camps along the North Face of Everest. Climbers make their final push to the summit from Camp VI at 8,230 metres (27,001 ft) altitude.

The North Col was first climbed by George Mallory, Edward Oliver Wheeler, and Guy Bullock on 24 September 1921, during the British reconnaissance expedition. This was the first time a Westerner had set foot on Mount Everest. Although long credited to Mallory, discovery of the North Col was in fact made by Wheeler about a week before Mallory confirmed its existence while searching for possible routes to the summit of Mount Everest. All subsequent expeditions in the 1920s and 1930s attempted to reach the summit of Everest by using the North Col.

Since 1950, most Everest expeditions now go from Nepal via the South Col. In 1951, two mountaineers on the 1952 British Cho Oyu expedition, Edmund Hillary and George Lowe, crossed the Nup La Col to the east of Cho Oyu, and "like a couple of naughty schoolboys" went deep into Chinese territory, down to Rongbuk and round to the old prewar Camp III beneath the North Col.

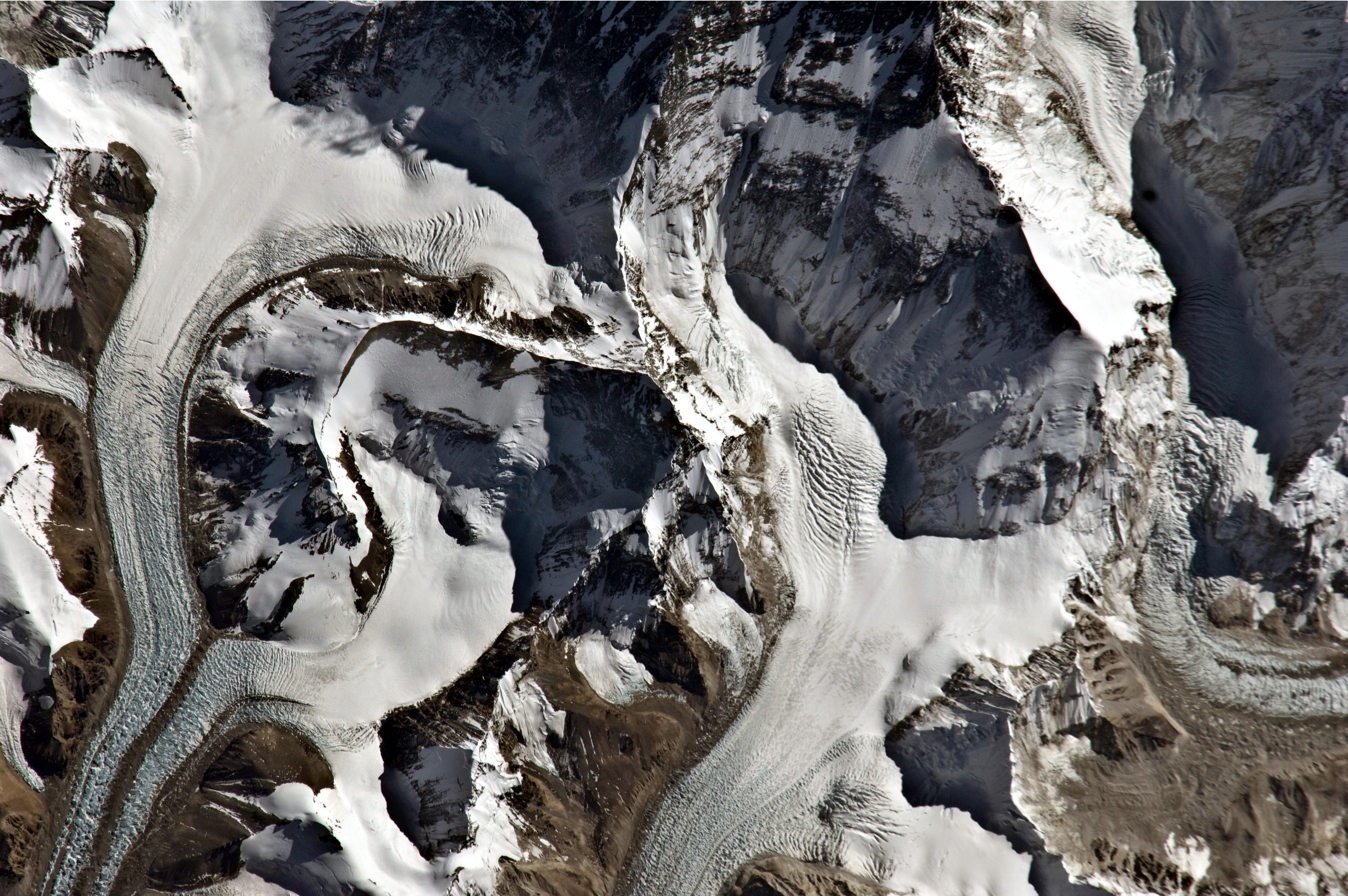
Satellite photograph of the northern approach to Mount Everest (upper edge) centered on the North Col

3D model of North Col

Sketch map of Everest region

== Overview ==
This map is inverted; south is up and north is down. The North Col is lower than South Col, and farther from the Everest peak.

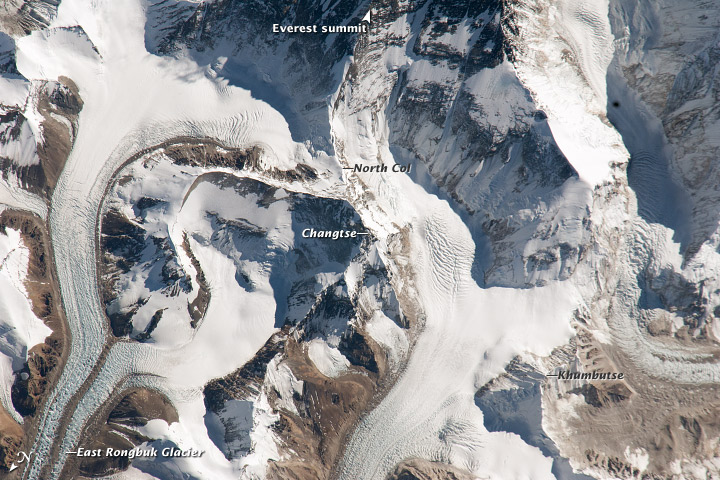
North Col

== See also ==
- South Col
- Sagarmatha National Park
- Geology of the Himalaya
- Geography of China
