= Lobuche, Nepal =

Lobuche लोबुचे
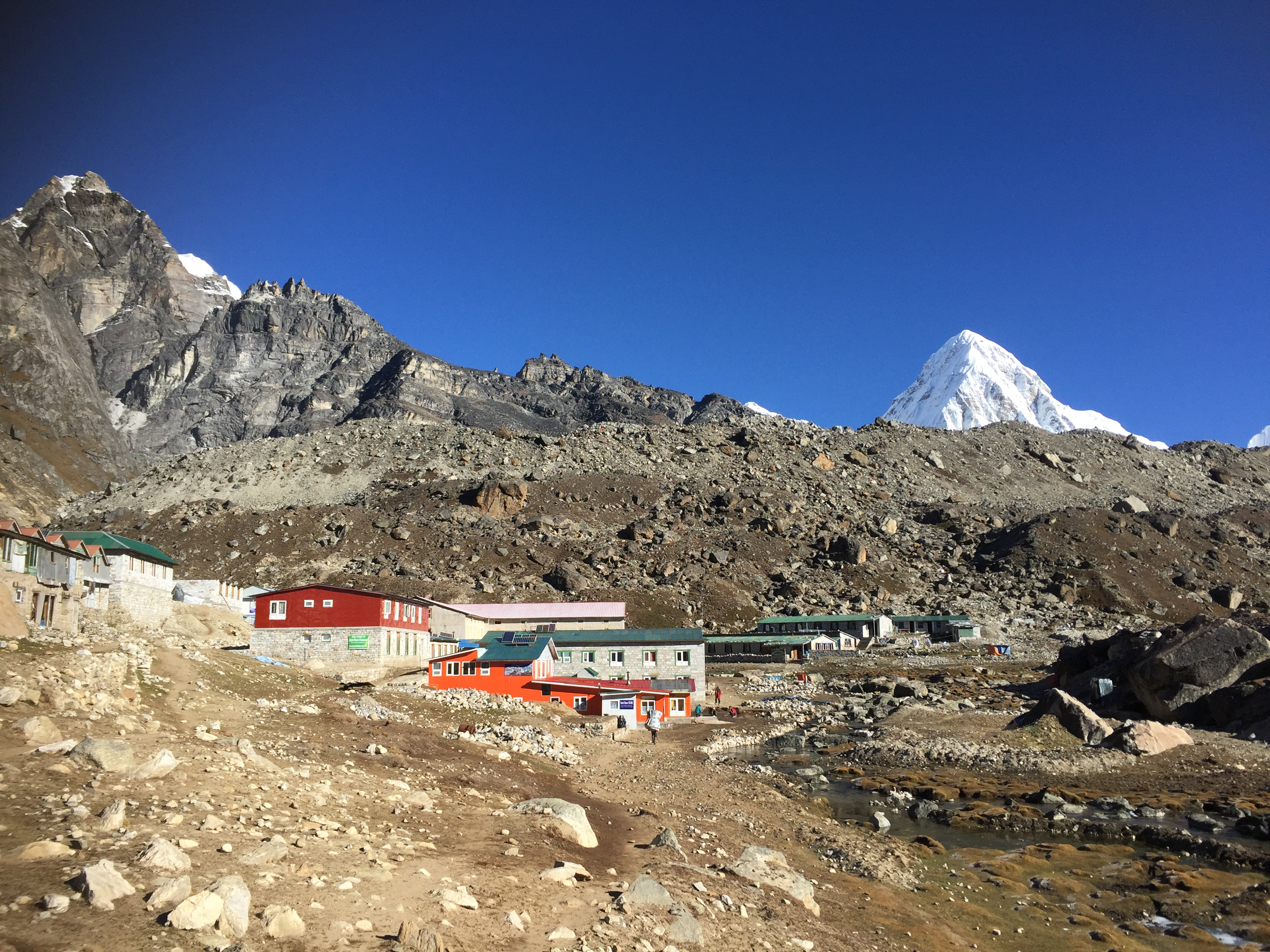
- Partial view of Lobuche from the trail lead to Dughla (Thukla)

- Location in Nepal
- Coordinates: 27°56′53″N 86°48′37″E
- Country: Nepal
- Zone: Sagarmatha
- District: Solukhumbu
- Elevation: 4,940 m (16,210 ft)
- Time zone: UTC+5:45 (Nepal Time)

Lobuche (or Lobuje) is a small settlement near Mount Everest in the Khumbu region of Nepal. As per the National Census of 2011, Lobuche village has a population of 86 locals living permanently in the highlands and there are 24 local households. It is one of the last overnight stops with lodging on the "trail to base camp", a hike that climbers make on their way to the Everest Base Camp (South) when attempting an ascent of Everest via the standard southeast route. It is also a popular stop among trekkers in the area. From there they can complete the trail on to EBC or stop at Gorak Shep, the last stop with lodging on the trail, and climb the modest nearby peak, Kala Patthar (5,545 m, 18,192 ft), for a rare view of the Everest summit. However, due to the shape of Everest and its surroundings, its summit is not visible from Base Camp.

Lobuche, at an elevation of about 4,940 metres (16,210 ft), lies about 150 kilometres (93 miles) east of Nepal's capital Kathmandu. It is located near the foot of the Khumbu Glacier, approximately 8.5 km SW of the Everest Base Camp. It shares its name with several peaks in the area: Lobuche Far East, Lobuche East and Lobuche West (a separate mountain further west). Labuche Kang (sometimes spelled Lobuche Kang) is not local but is in Tibet.

Lobuche is a particularly busy place each year in the month of April as hundreds of porters and Sherpas from the region pass through Lobuche on their way to Base Camp. Many of them also move supplies, with the aid of yaks or other means, for various climbers and expeditions also traveling up the trail in preparation for the Everest spring climbing season in May.

The lodging accommodations at Lobuche are notoriously primitive, consisting mostly of stone huts with shared bunk dormitories. In recent years there have been some additions of more modern facilities and amenities including seven lodges providing 200 twin-bed rooms. Some lodges provide internet and oxygen services.

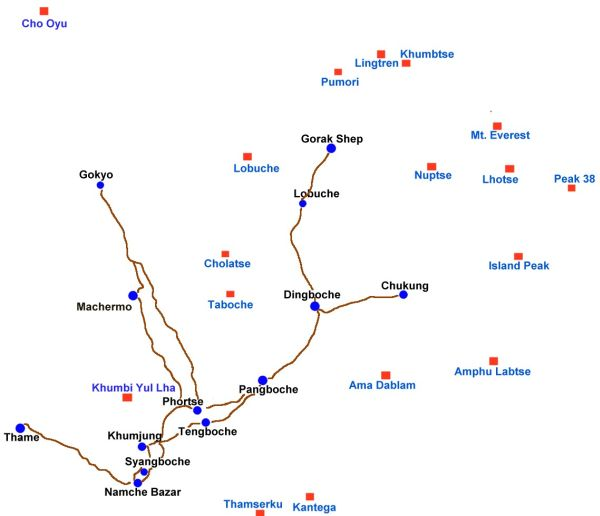
Map of the Khumbu region

== Gallery ==
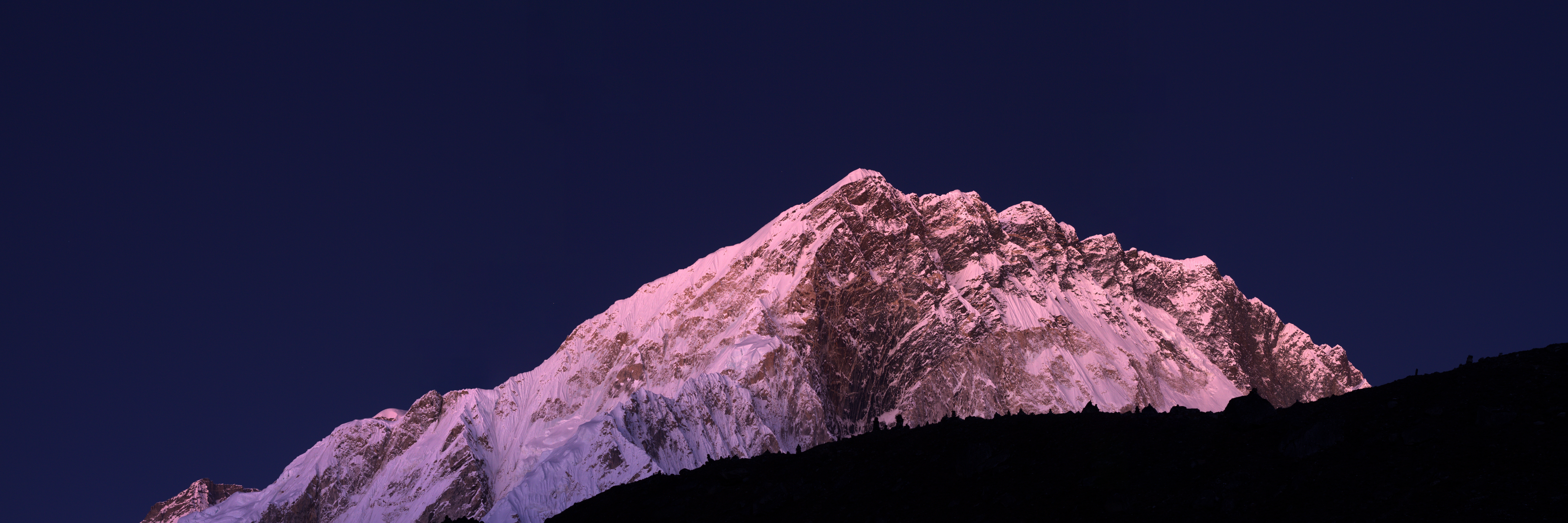
Nuptse from near Lobuche
