= Khumbutse =

Mountain in Nepal/China

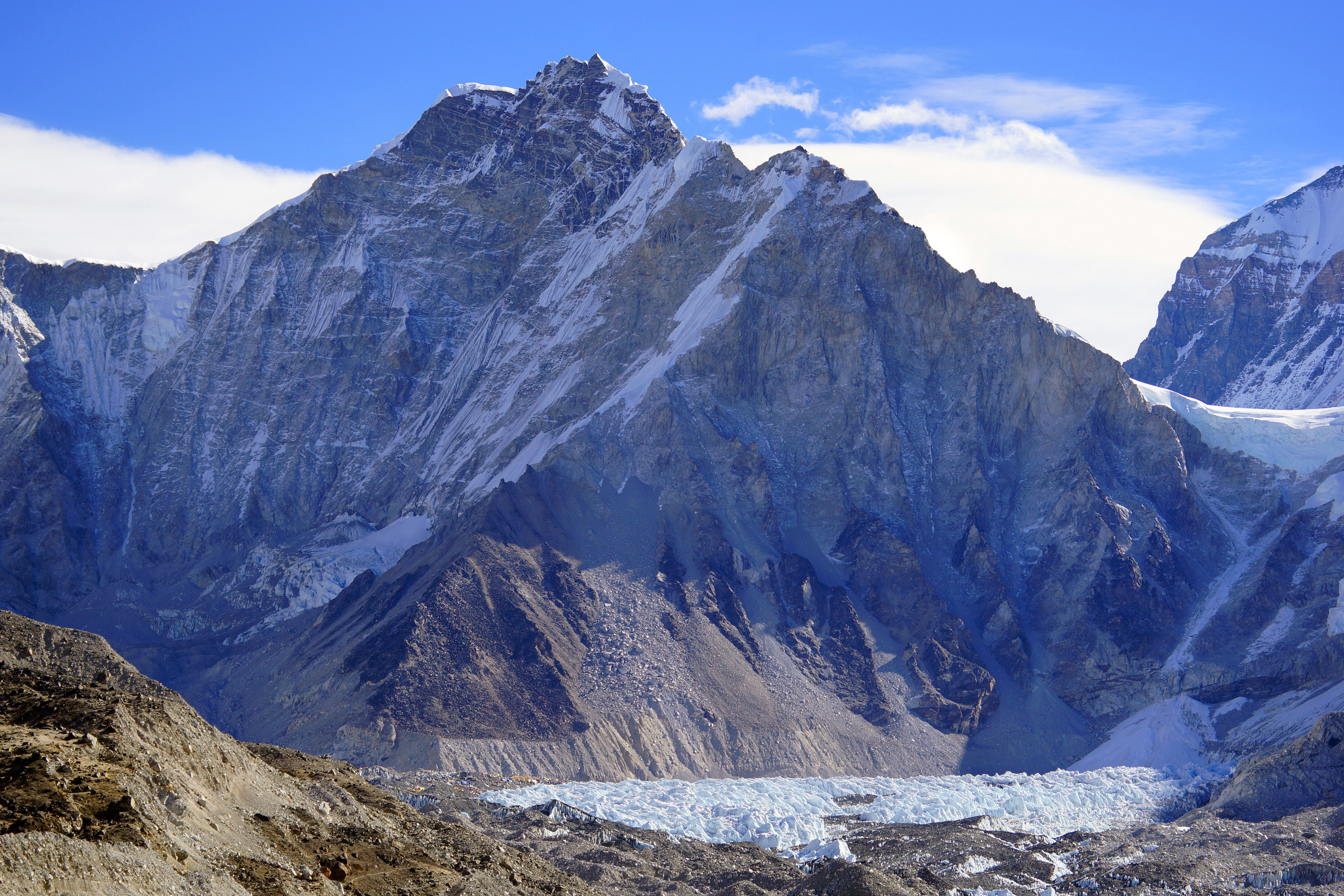
- Khumbutse

Highest point
- Elevation: 6,636 m (21,772 ft)
- Prominence: 515 m (1,690 ft)
- Coordinates: 28°01′13″N 86°52′23″E

Geography
- Location within Koshi Province Location within Nepal Location within Tibet
- Location: Solukhumbu District, Sagarmatha Zone, Nepal; Tingri County, Shigatse Prefecture, Tibet Autonomous Region, China
- Parent range: Mahalangur Himal, Himalayas

Climbing
- First ascent: 1979 by Franček Knez
- Easiest route: glacier/snow/ice

Khumbutse (Tibetan: ཁུམ་བུ་རྩེ།, Wylie: khum bu rtse; Chinese: 孔布則峰; pinyin: Kǒngbùzé fēng; Nepali: खुम्बुत्से) is the first mountain west (6 km) of Mount Everest. It lies at the border between Nepal and China.

== Overview ==
Khumbutse's name indicates its location at the head of the Khumbu valley, down which the Khumbu Glacier flows. It is one of the prominent mountains above the southern Everest Base Camp, and is seen in many views from the nearby trekking routes, including at Gorak Shep.

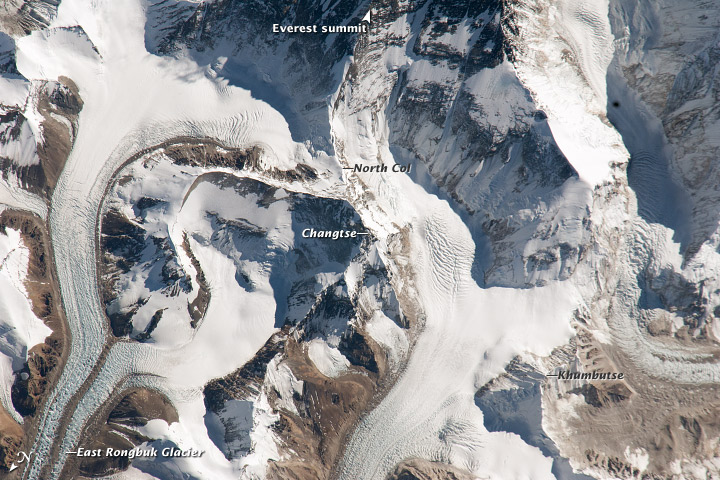
Aerial image showing the location of Khumbutse (lower right). Note that the image is oriented with south-east to the top

== Gallery ==
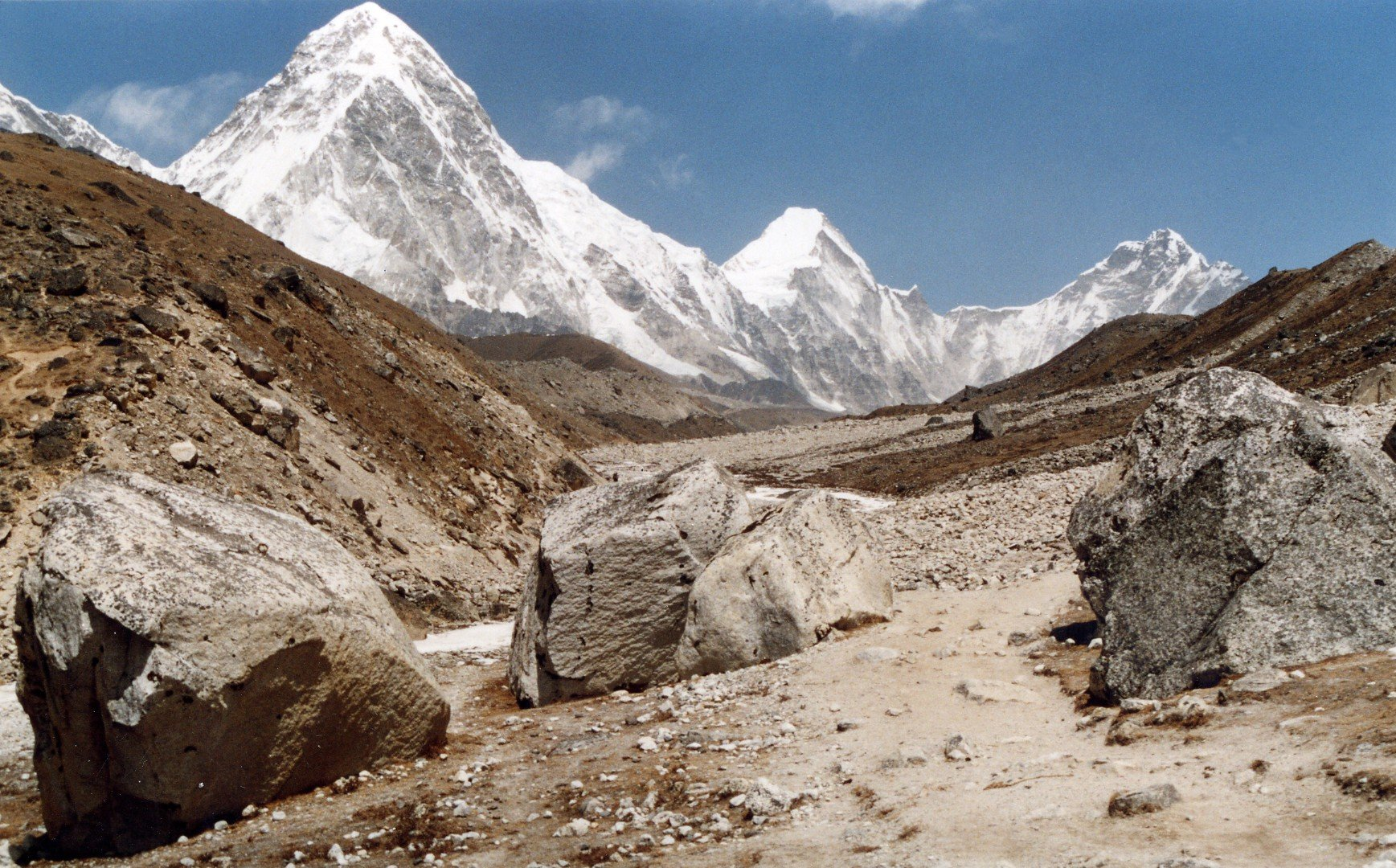
Left to right: Pumori-Lingtren-Khumbutse

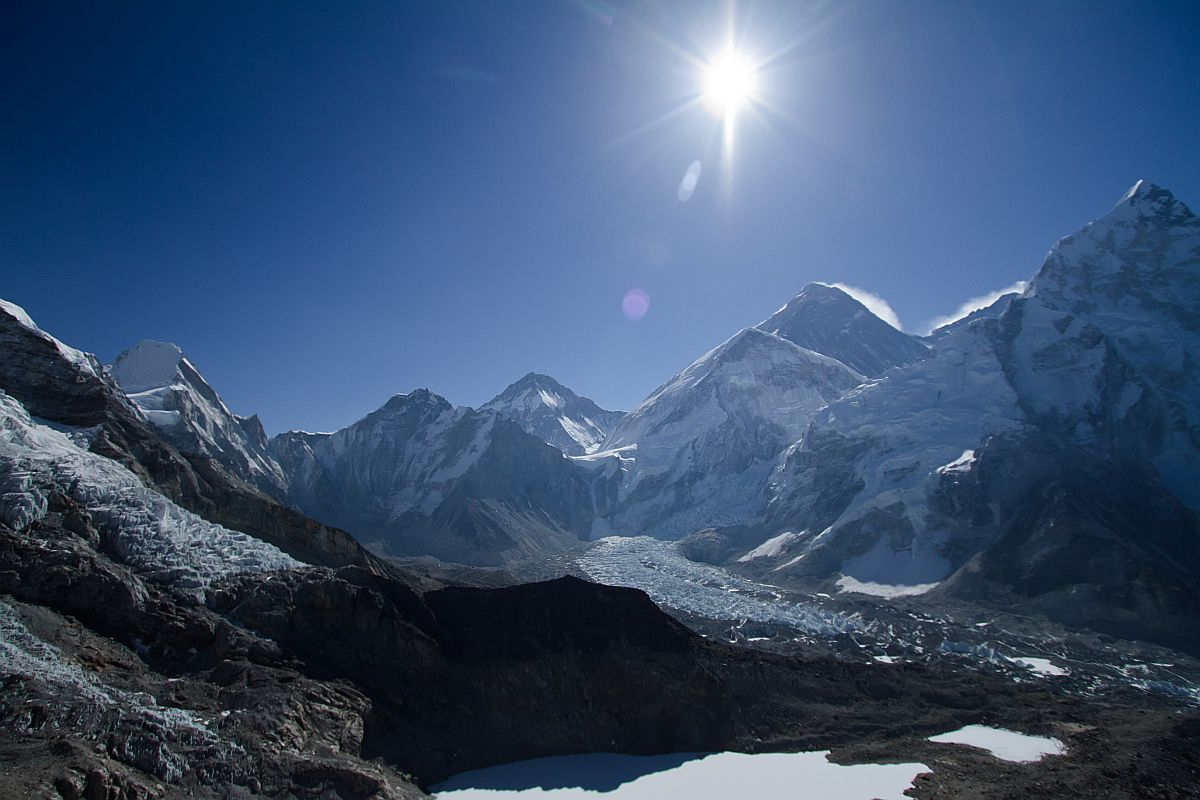
Lingtren, Khumbutse, and Everest West Shoulder overlook base camp and the Khumbu Icefall. Mount Everest South-West face (above the west shoulder) and Nuptse's side to right

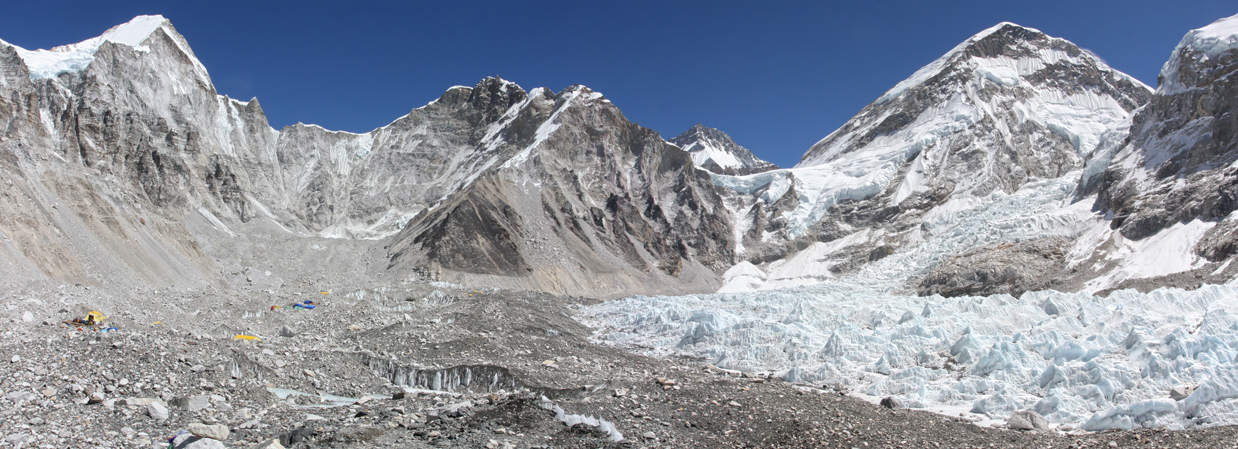
Left to right: Lingtren-Khumbutse - Everest west shoulder.

== See also ==
- List of mountains in China
- List of mountains in Nepal
- Everest Base Camp
