= Everest road =

Road in Tibet, China

The Everest road is a Chinese road that reaches the North Base Camp of Mount Everest or Qomolangma (name of mountain in Tibetan). The paved road branches from China National Highway 318 at Tingri County, Tibet Autonomous Region and moves through the Qomolangma National Nature Preserve.

The road was first built as a gravel and rock road and later paved in 2015. The route is 110 km and first ascends uphill before going downhill with many hairpin turns along the way before reaching the North Base Camp. The route holds magnificent views of Shisha Pangma to Cho Oyu, Everest, Makalu, and Lhotse. A mountain guide quoted by National Geographic on the opening of the paved road called it "one of the coolest roads I’ve seen anywhere on the planet". Since the road ends at the tourist base camp, it has spurred a large increase in tourism to the area. The road has made the Chinese side of Mount Everest much easier to access than compared to the ten-day trek required to reach the South Base Camp in Nepal.
