= Everest base camps =

Staging areas at Mount Everest

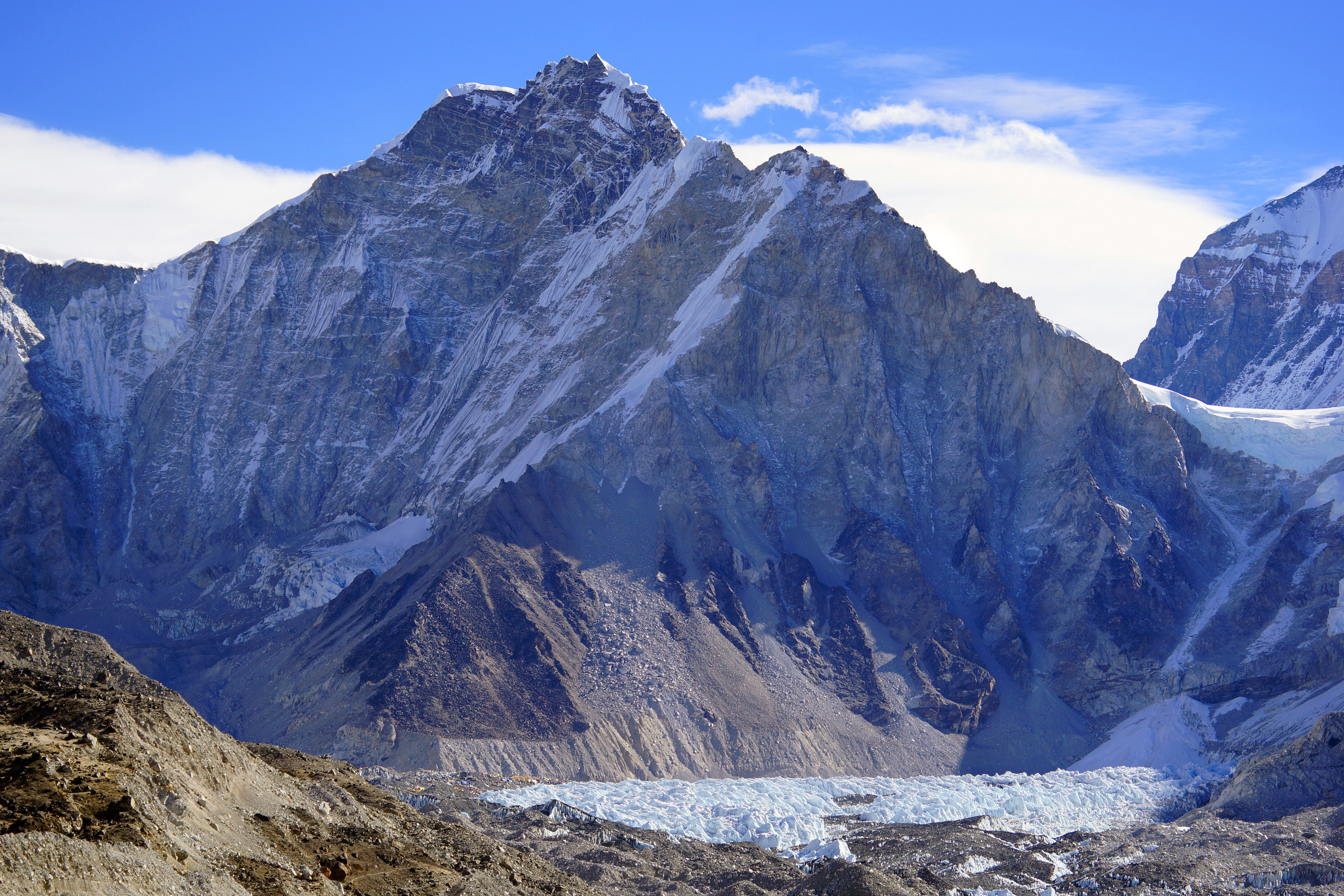
Khumbutse overlooks a sprinkling of colored tents—, South Base Camp in Nepal.

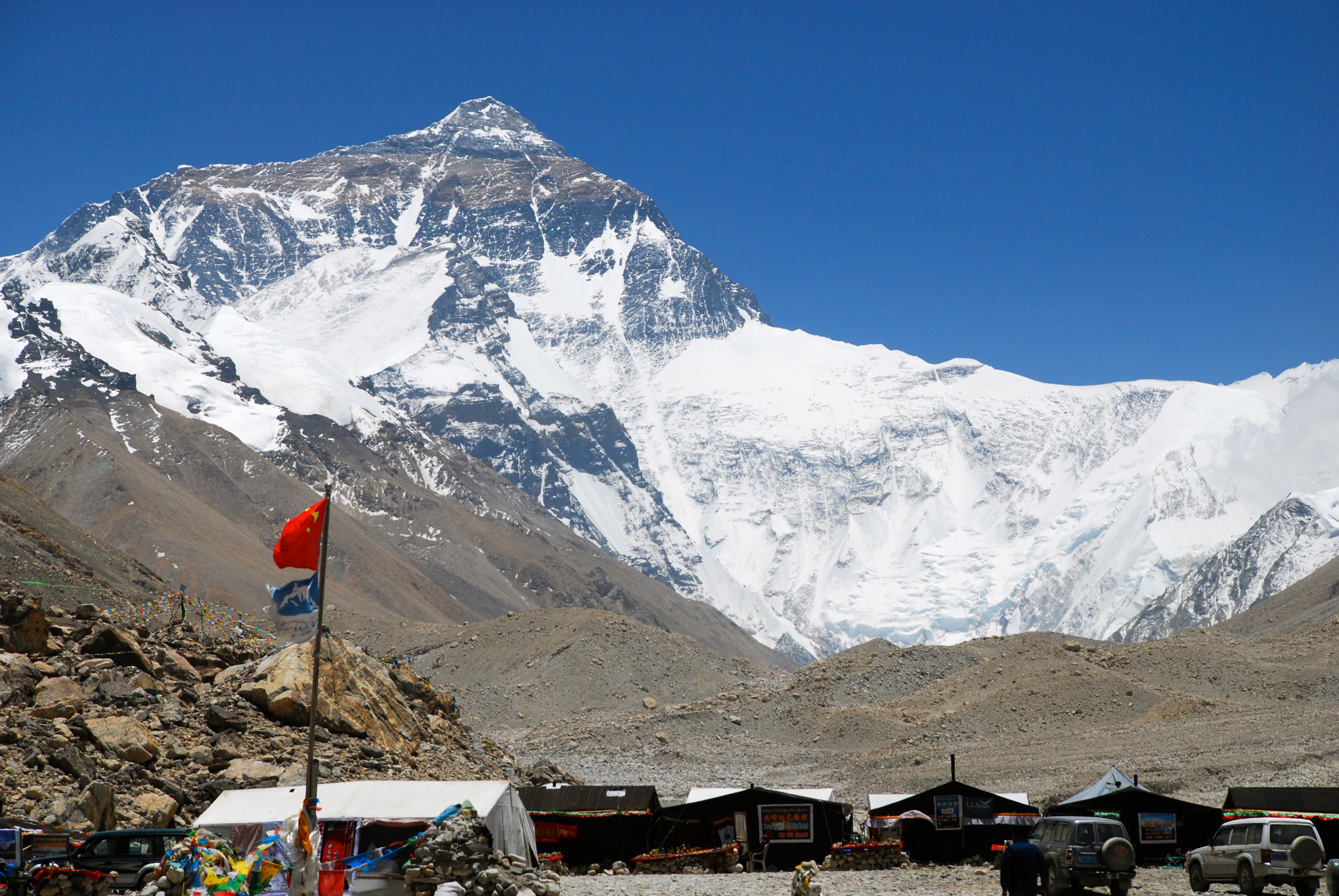
Mount Everest from the perspective of North Base Camp in Tibet

There are two base camps on Mount Everest, on opposite sides of the mountain: South Base Camp is in Nepal at an altitude of 5,364 metres (17,598 ft) (28°0′26″N 86°51′34″E), while North Base Camp is in Tibet at 5,150 metres (16,900 ft) (28°8′29″N 86°51′5″E).

The base camps are rudimentary campsites at the base of Mount Everest that are used by mountain climbers during their ascent and descent. They are also visited by hikers. South Base Camp is used when climbing via the southeast ridge, while North Base Camp is used when climbing via the northeast ridge.

Supplies are shipped to the South Base Camp by porters, and with the help of animals, usually yaks. The North Base Camp is accessed by a paved road that branches from China National Highway 318. Climbers typically rest at base camp for several days for acclimatization, to reduce the risk of altitude sickness.

== South Base Camp in Nepal ==
South Base Camp (Nepal)
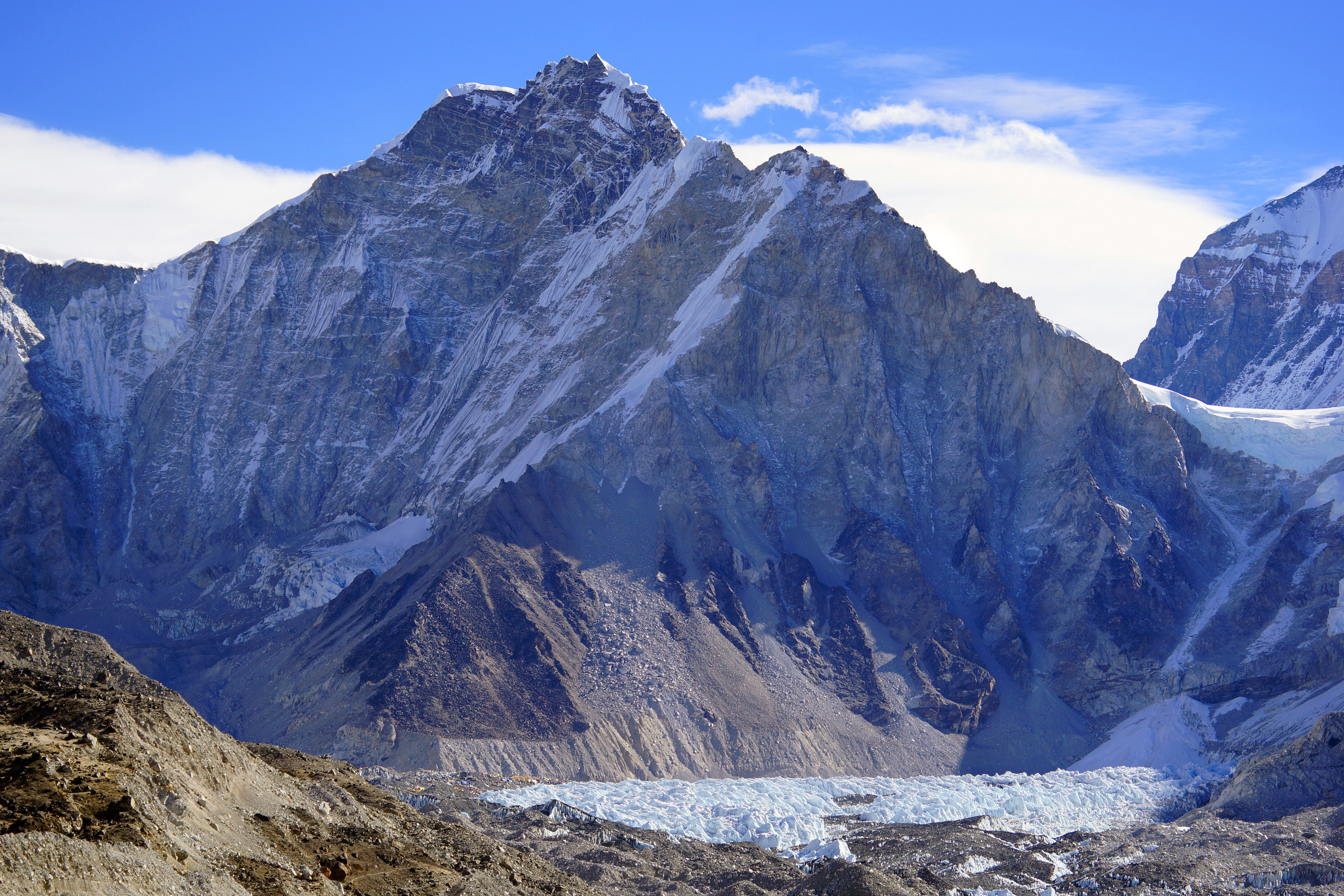
- Khumbutse overlooks a sprinkling of colored tents South Base Camp in Nepal.
- Interactive map of South Base Camp (Nepal)
- Location: Nepal
- Coordinates: 28°0′26″N 86°51′34″E
- Elevation: 5,364 metres (17,598 ft)
- Facilities: Rudimentary field hospital, heliport

The Everest Base Camp trek on the south side, at an elevation of 5,364 m (17,598 ft), is one of the most popular trekking routes in the Himalayas and about 40,000 people per year make the trek there from Lukla Airport (2,846 m or 9,337 ft). Trekkers usually fly from Kathmandu to Lukla to save time and energy before beginning the trek to the base camp. However, trekking to Lukla is possible. There are no roads from Kathmandu to Lukla and as a result, the only method of transporting large and heavy goods is by plane.

Everest Base Trek Route Map from Nepal side

From Lukla, climbers trek upward to the Sherpa capital of Namche Bazaar, 3,440 metres (11,290 ft), following the valley of the Dudh Kosi river. It takes about two days to reach the village, which is the central hub of the area. Typically at this point, climbers allow a day of rest for acclimatization. They then trek for another two days to Dingboche, 4,260 metres (13,980 ft) before resting for another day for further acclimatization. Most trekkers use the traditional trail via Tengboche monastery, but recently, the high trail via Mong La and Phortse has gained popularity due to the impressive views it offers. Another two days takes them to Everest Base Camp via Gorakshep, the flat field below Kala Patthar, 5,545 metres (18,192 ft) and Mt. Pumori.

On 25 April 2015, an earthquake measuring 7.8 on the moment magnitude scale, struck Nepal and triggered an avalanche on Pumori that swept through the South Base Camp. At least 19 people were said to have been killed as a result. Just over two weeks later, on 12 May, a second quake struck measuring 7.3 on the M_{w}. Some of the trails leading to Everest Base Camp were damaged by these earthquakes and needed repairs.

On 17 June 2022, it was announced that the camp would be moved 200 to 400 metres (700 to 1,300 ft) lower, since the Khumbu Glacier, on which the campsite is located, is rapidly melting and thinning out, which makes it unsafe for the trekkers.

In March 2024, a new signboard at Everest Base Camp was unveiled, sparking strong reactions from some trekkers and mountaineers who preferred a graffiti coated rock that had long been considered the base of the climb. The signboard, located at the iconic base camp, featured updated information and an image of Sir Edmund Hillary and Tenzing Norgay. Local authorities removed the signboard in May 2024, a move that is speculated to have been due to unpopularity, although the authorities have stated they wish to eventually reinstate the signboard with additional information and with increased protection to help it withstand seasonal ground movement.

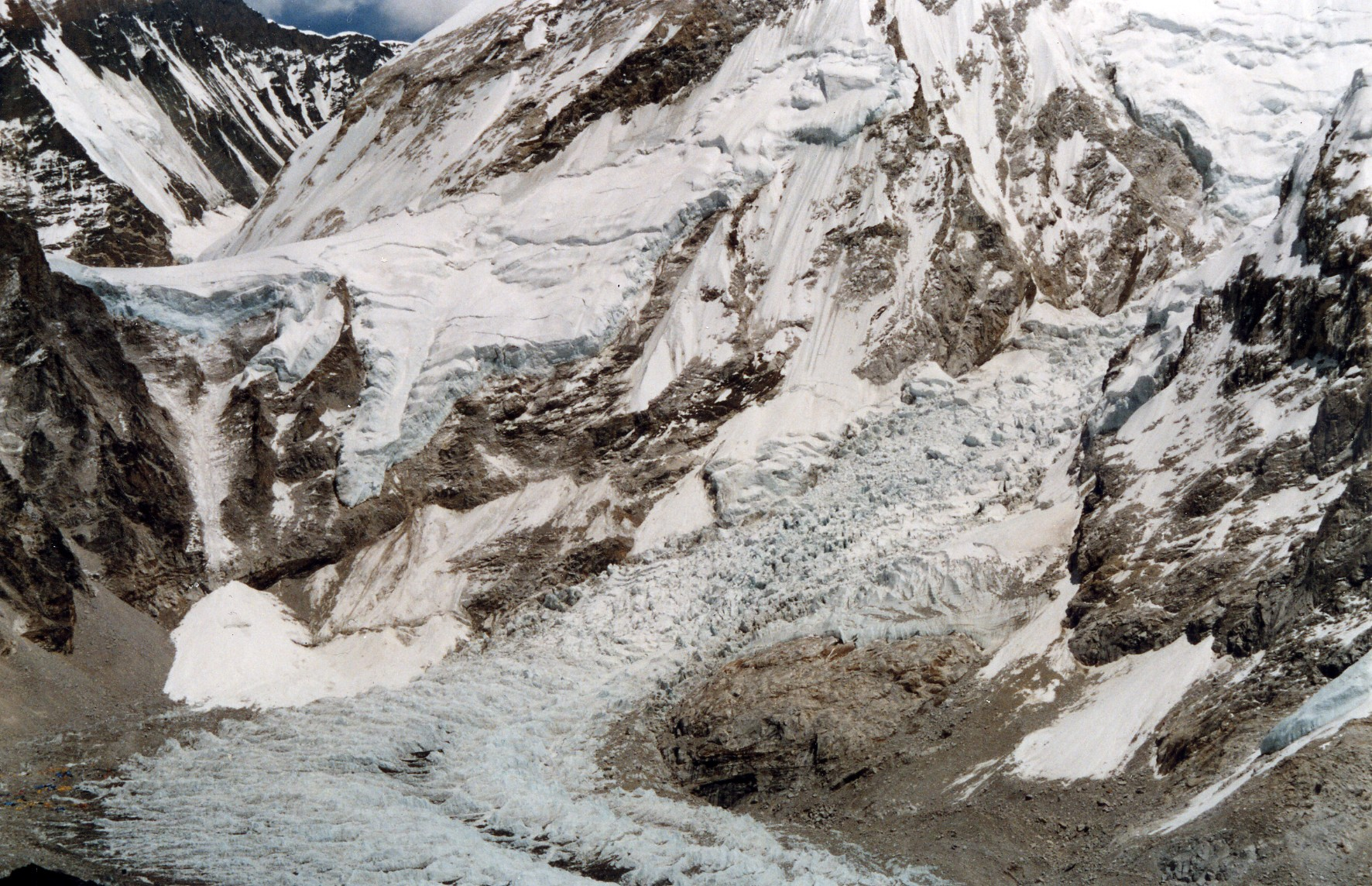
Nepal's EBC bottom left, Khumbu Icefall to the right

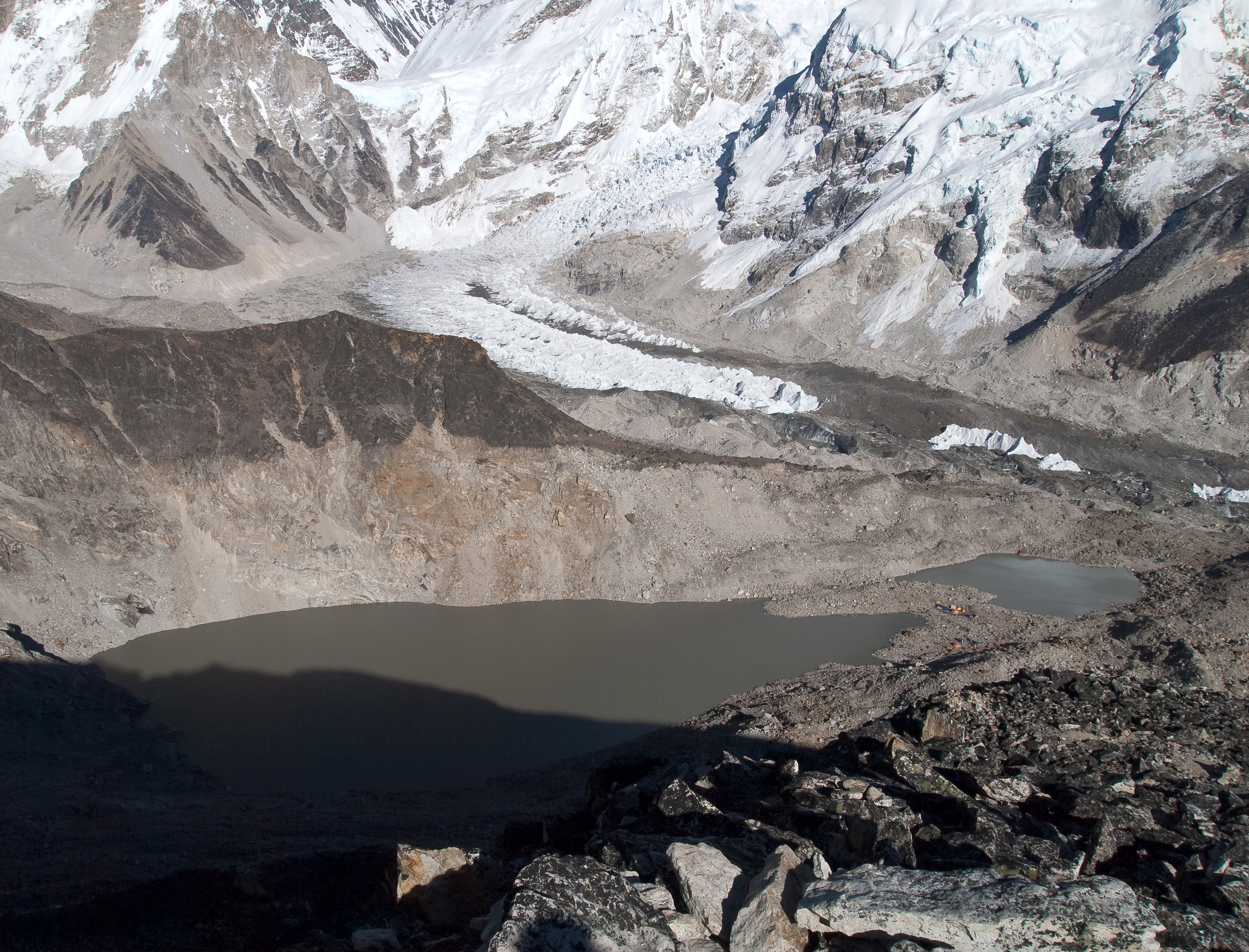
Panoramic view of Khumbu glacier with EBC site on the left above ridge

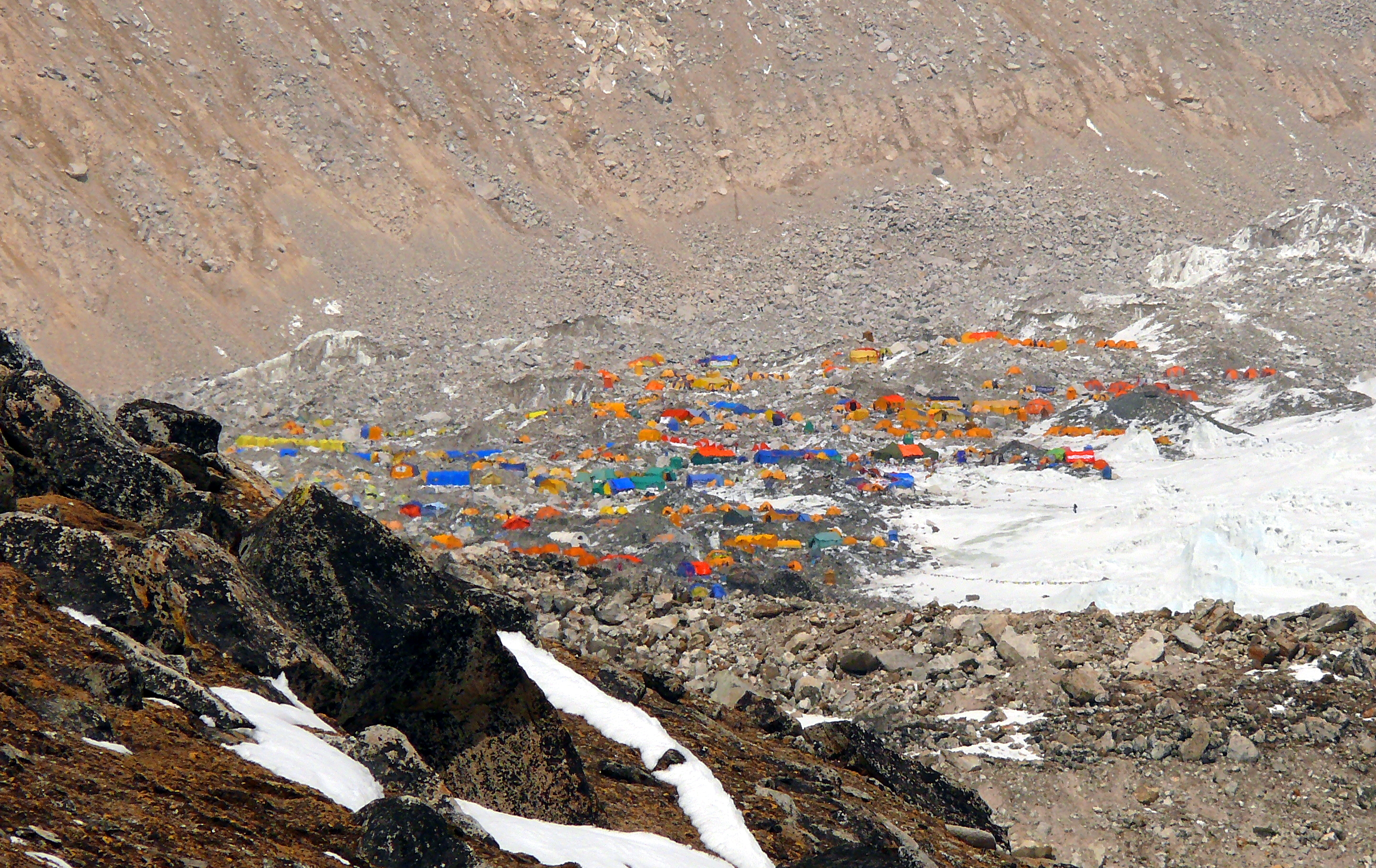
Everest Base Camp

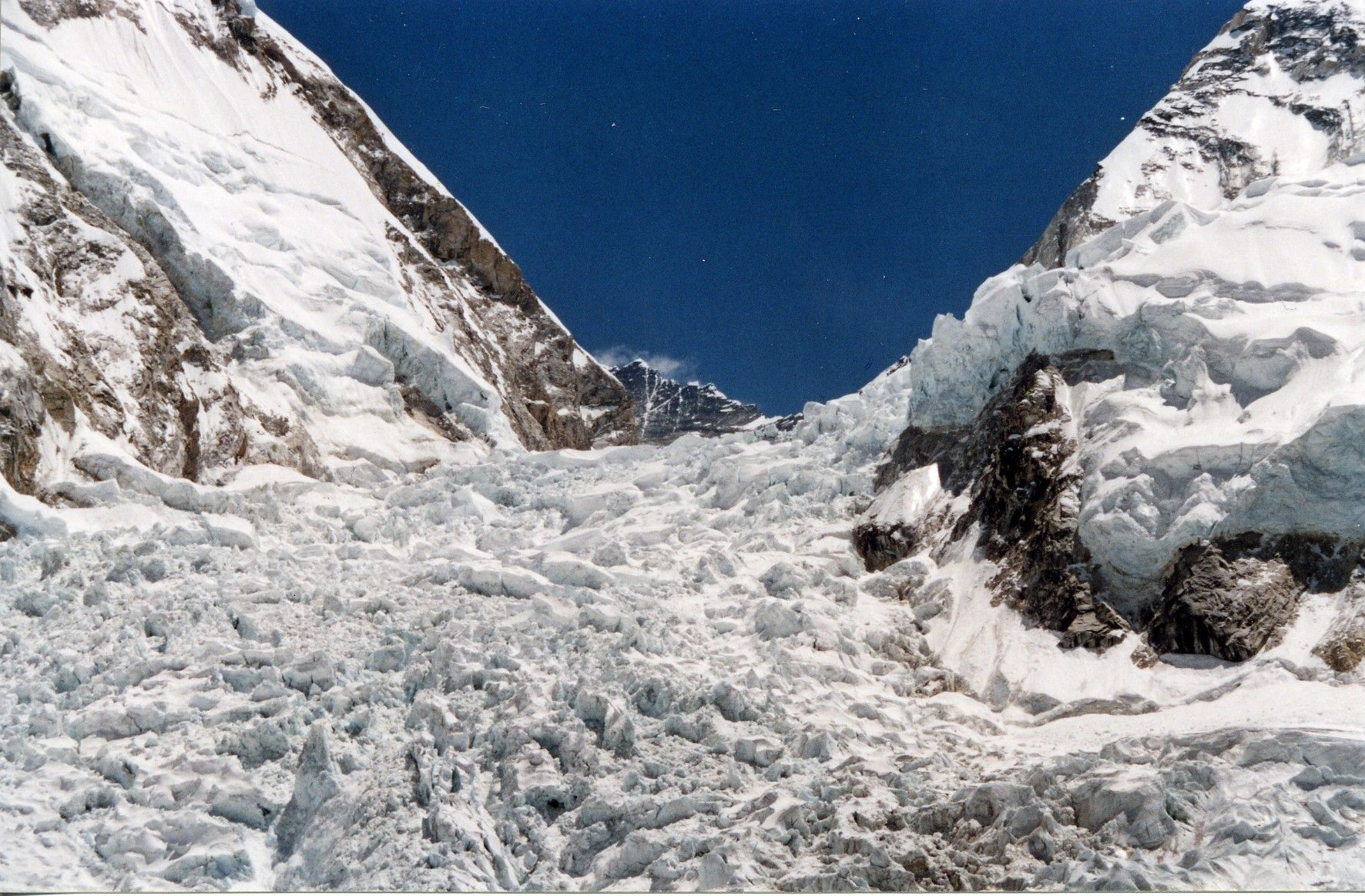
Khumbu icefall

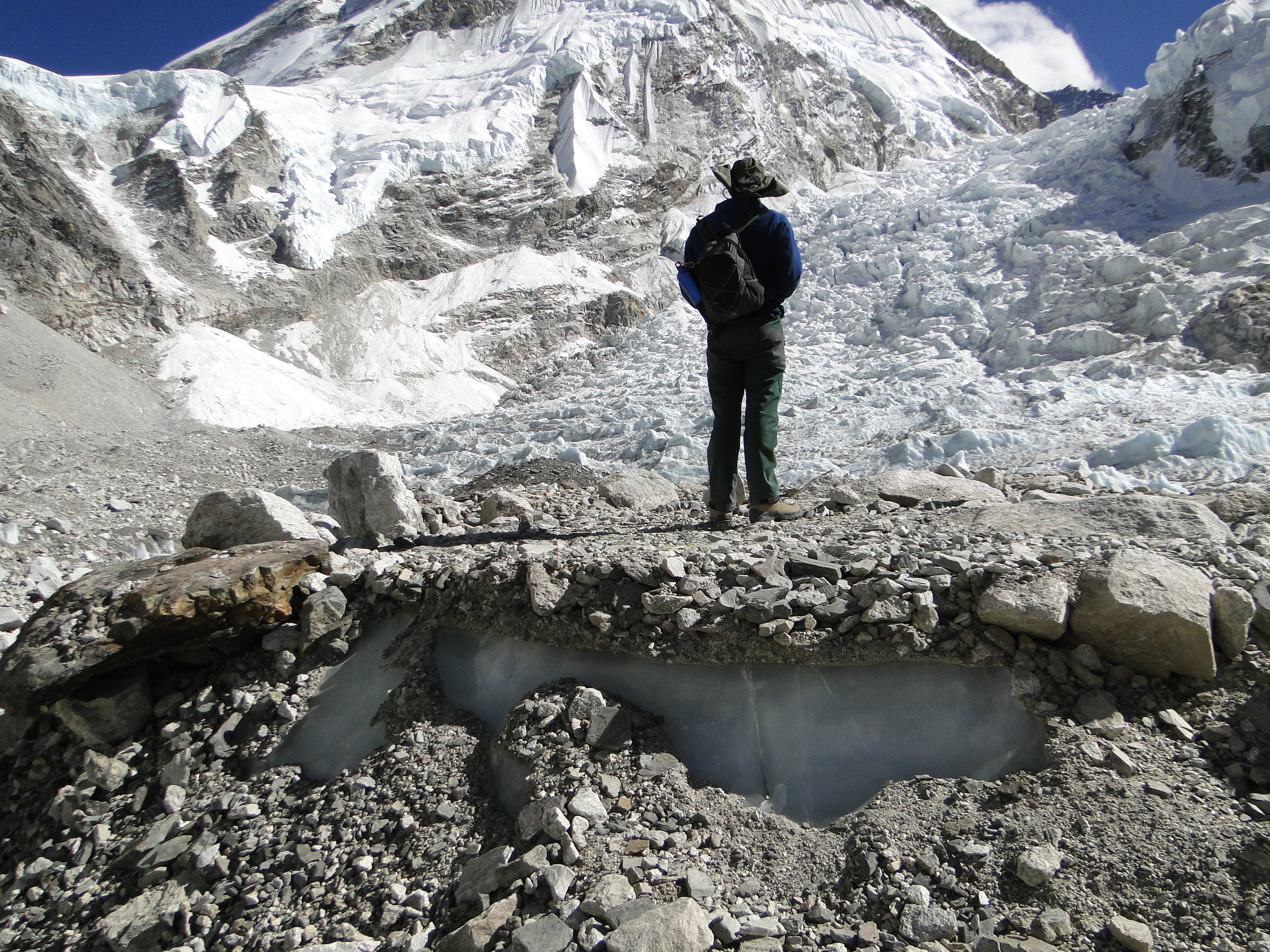
A temporary tent platform on the Khumbu glacier at South EBC, Nepal

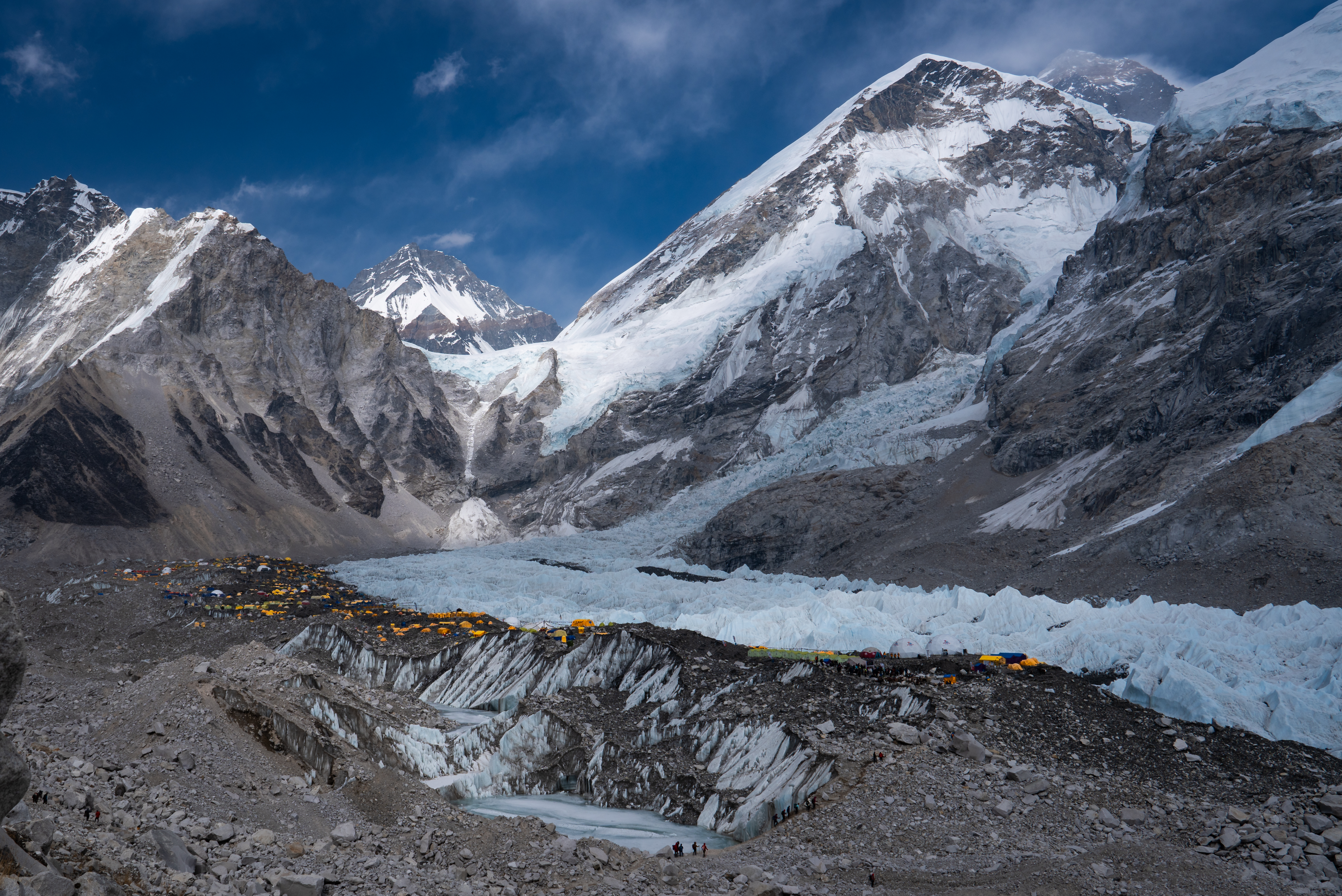
Everest Base Camp sits on top of melting glacier
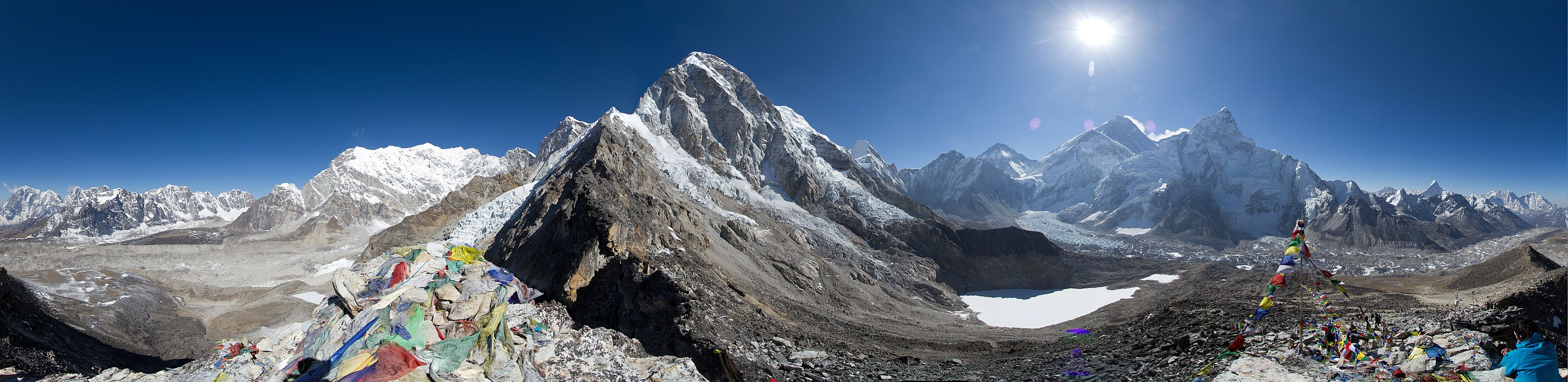
Panoramic view of Sagarmatha National Park from Kala Patthar

== North Base Camp in Tibet ==
North Base Camp (Tibet)
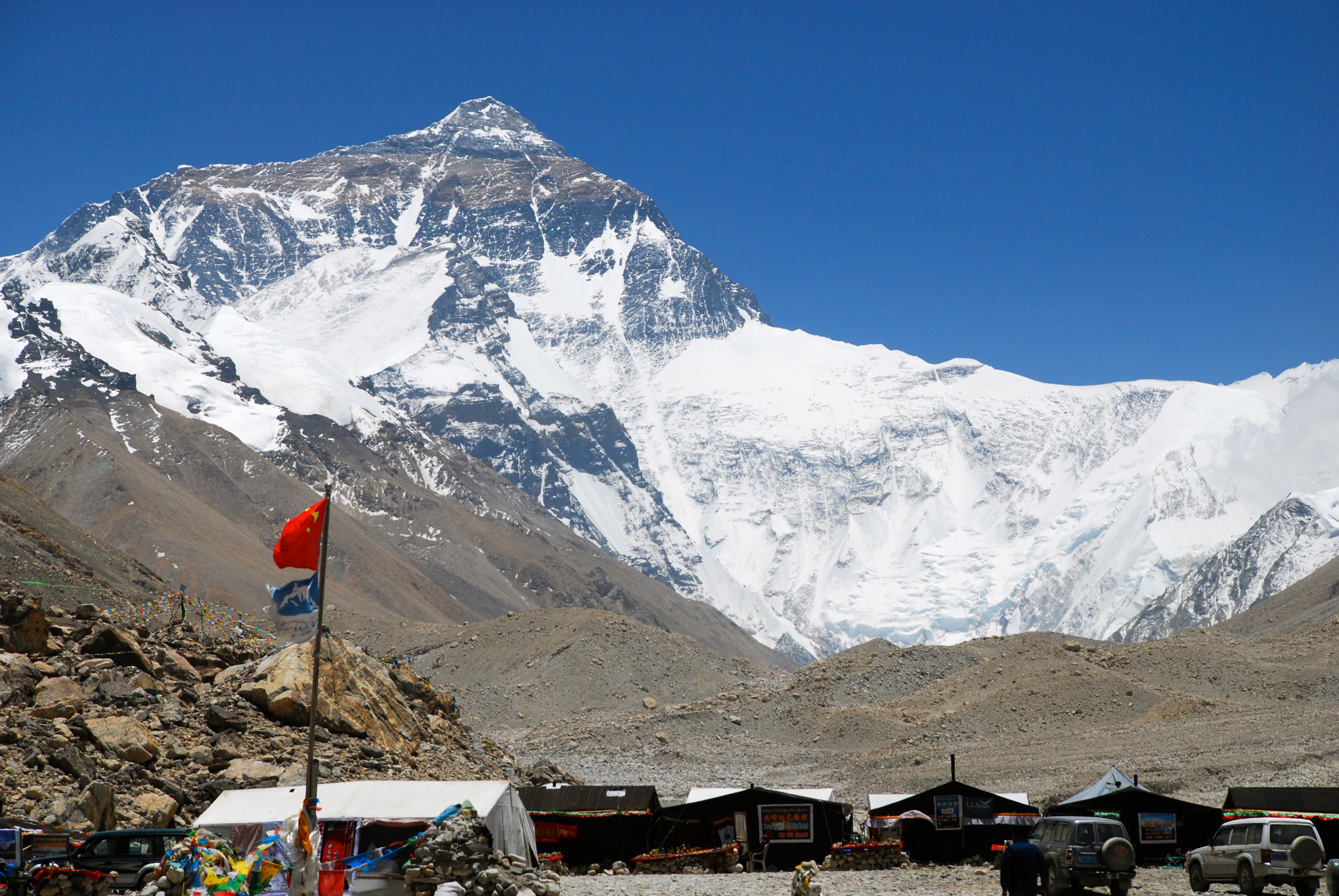
- Mount Everest from the perspective of base camp, Tibet
- Interactive map of North Base Camp (Tibet)
- Location: Tibet
- Coordinates: 28°8′29″N 86°51′5″E
- Elevation: 5,200 metres (16,900 ft)

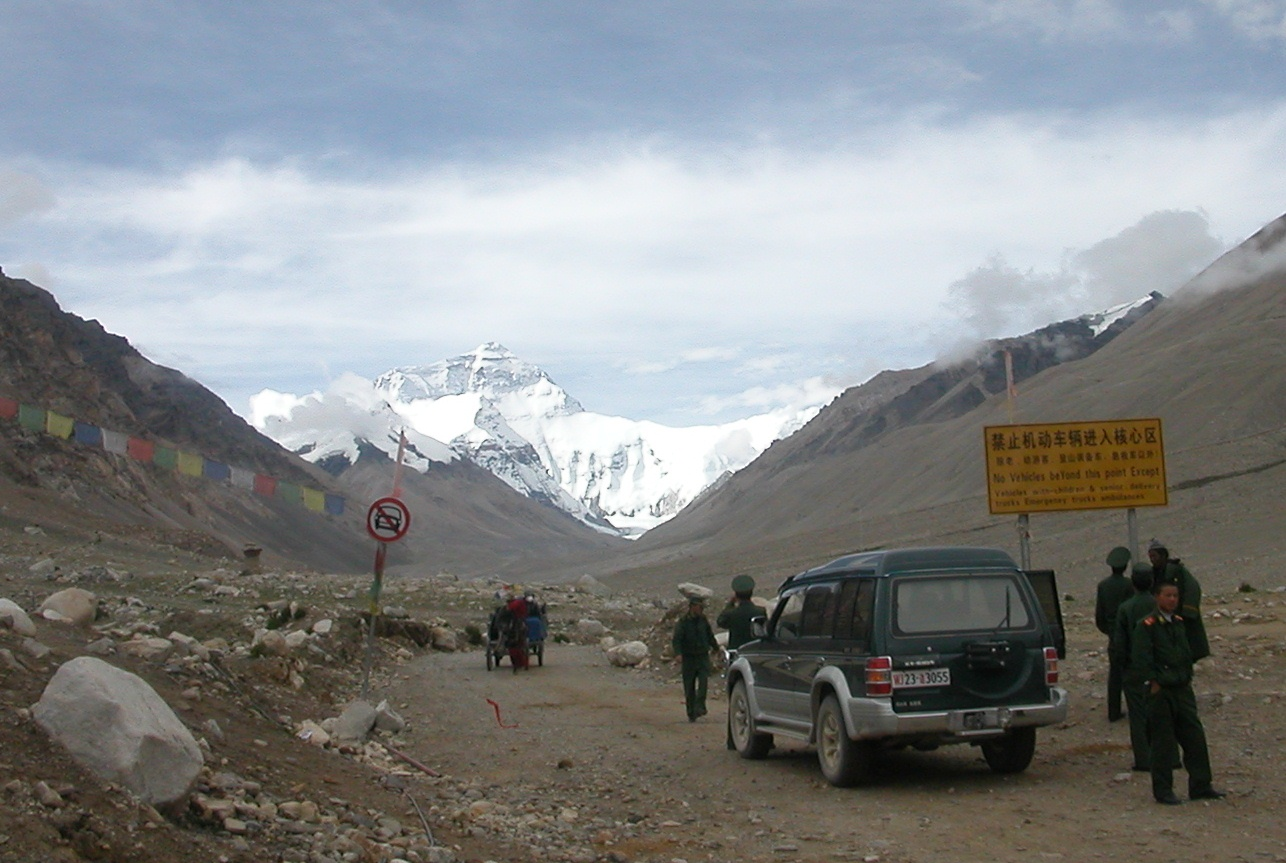
Starting point for the North Base Camp is the Rongbuk monastery. Mount Everest is seen in the background.

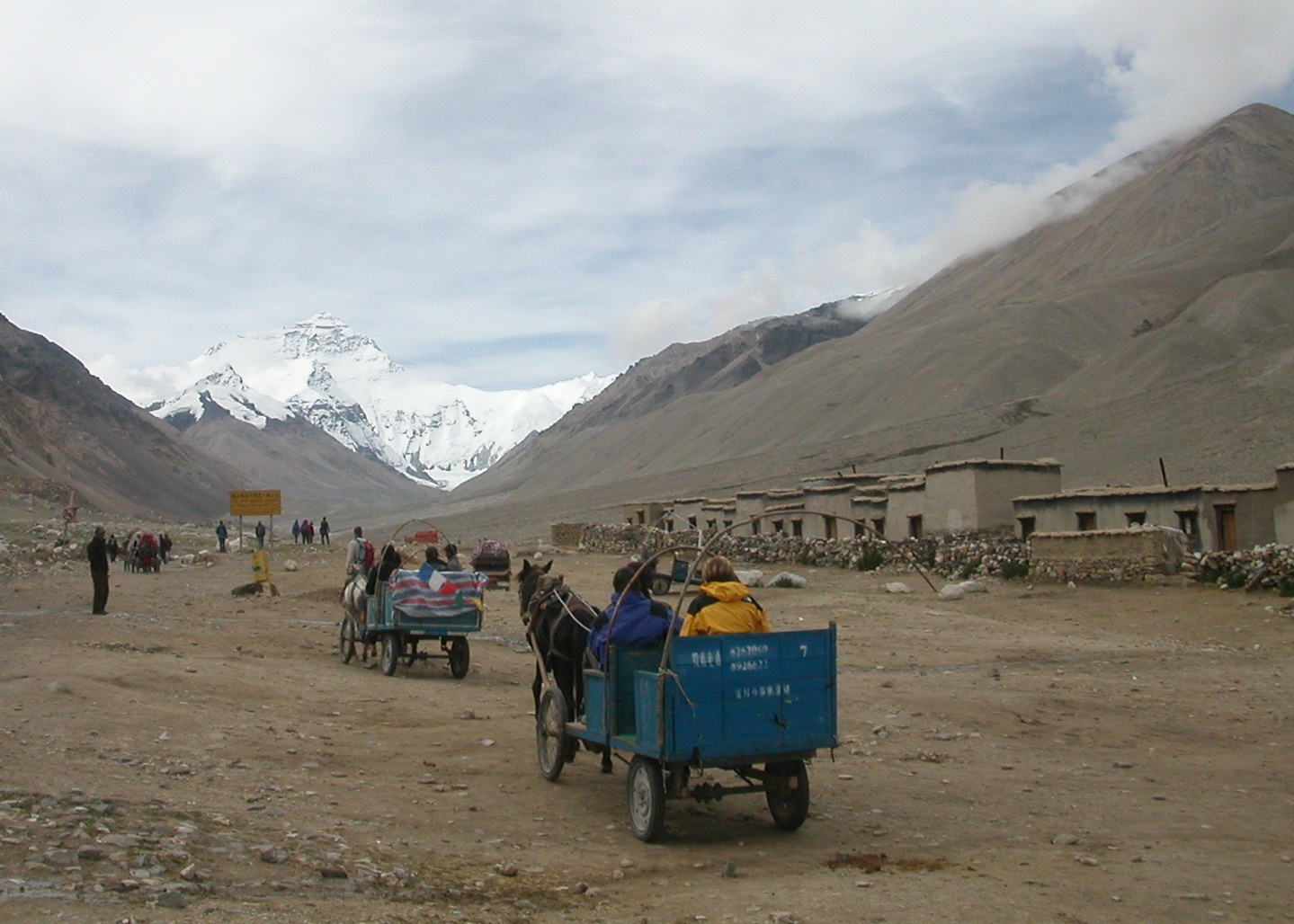
Rongbuk monastery with Mount Everest in the background. Here is the starting point for the North Base Camp. Tourists may reach it with horse-drawn carriages managed by the government.

A visit to the North Base Camp requires a permit from the Government of the People's Republic of China, on top of the permit required to visit Tibet itself. Such permits can be arranged via travel companies in Lhasa as part of a package tour that included hiring a vehicle, driver, and guide. The North Base Camp is accessed by vehicle through a 100 km (62 mile) road branching to the South from the Friendship Highway near Shelkar, at the southern foot of the 5,220-metre (17,130 ft) high Gyatso La pass. The road leads to Rongbuk Monastery, with dramatic views of the north face of Mount Everest. From the Rombuk guest house, all tourists were required to take the horse-drawn carriages or small buses managed by the government to limit the traffic on the last stretch of gravel road to a marked hill at 5,200 metres above sea level, just before the climbers' camp.

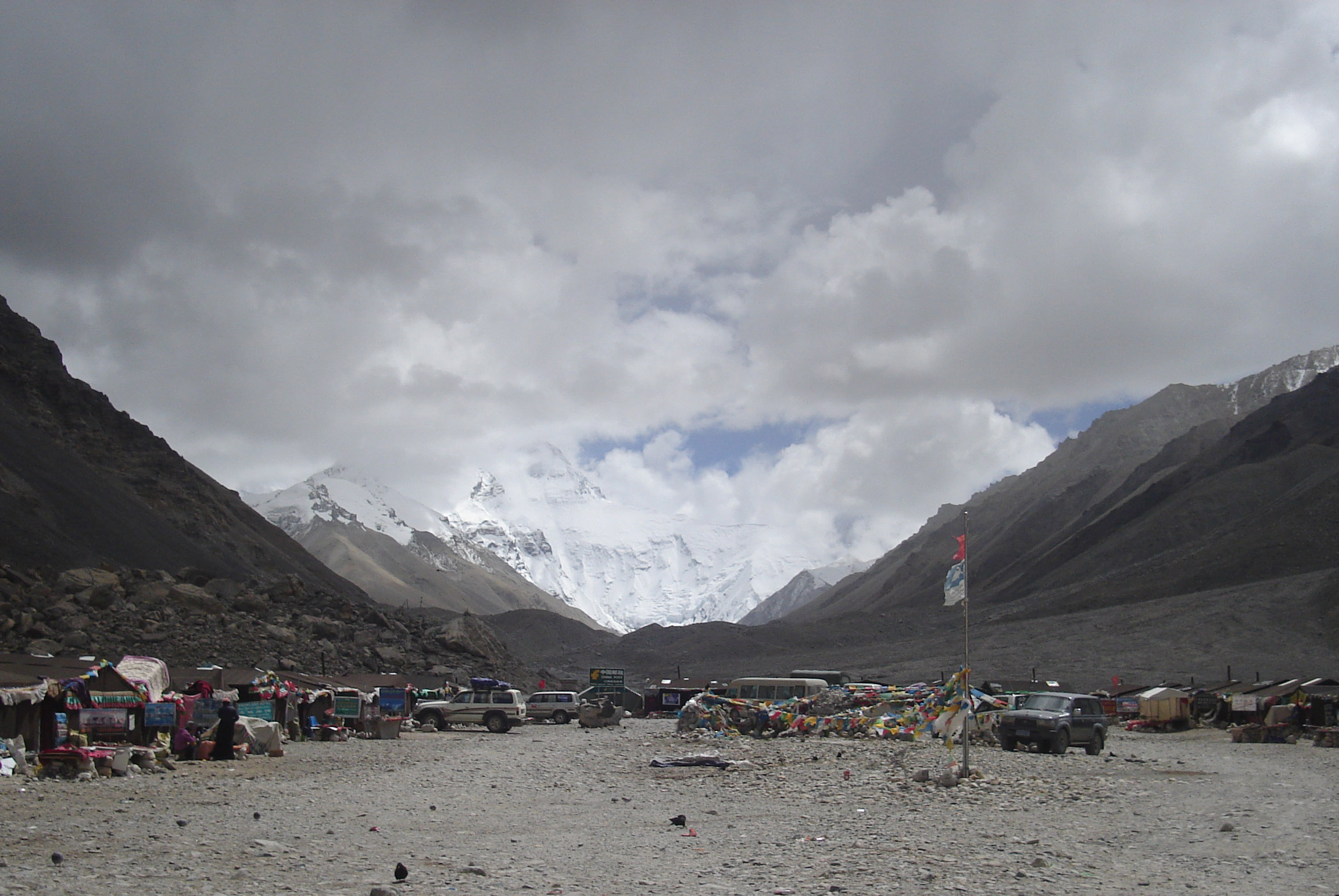
Tent village established for tourists' convenience called Everest Base Camp, in Tibet. It is the furthest that private cars can go. Mount Everest can be seen in the background.

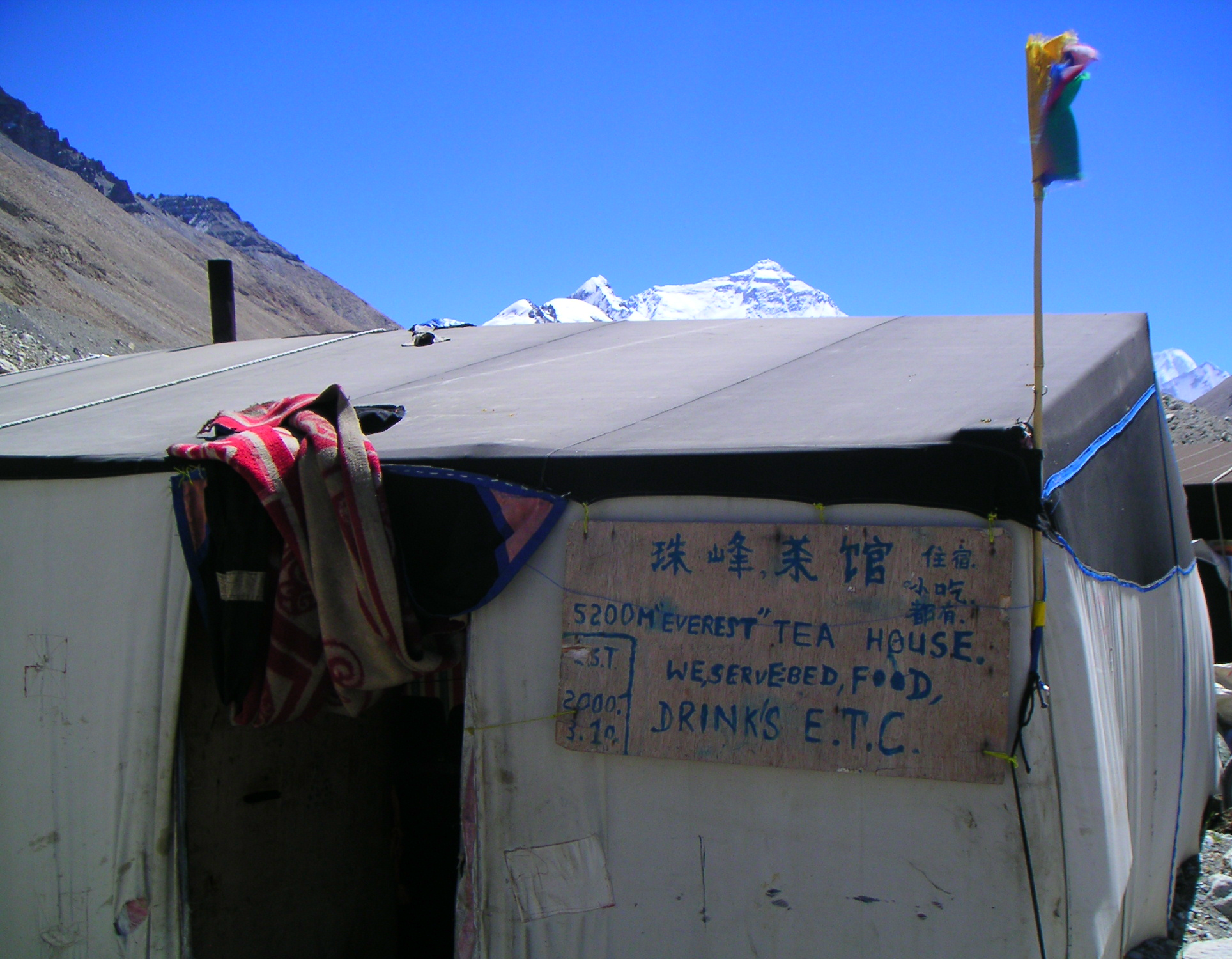
Tea house at the North Everest Base Camp. Mount Everest is visible in the background.

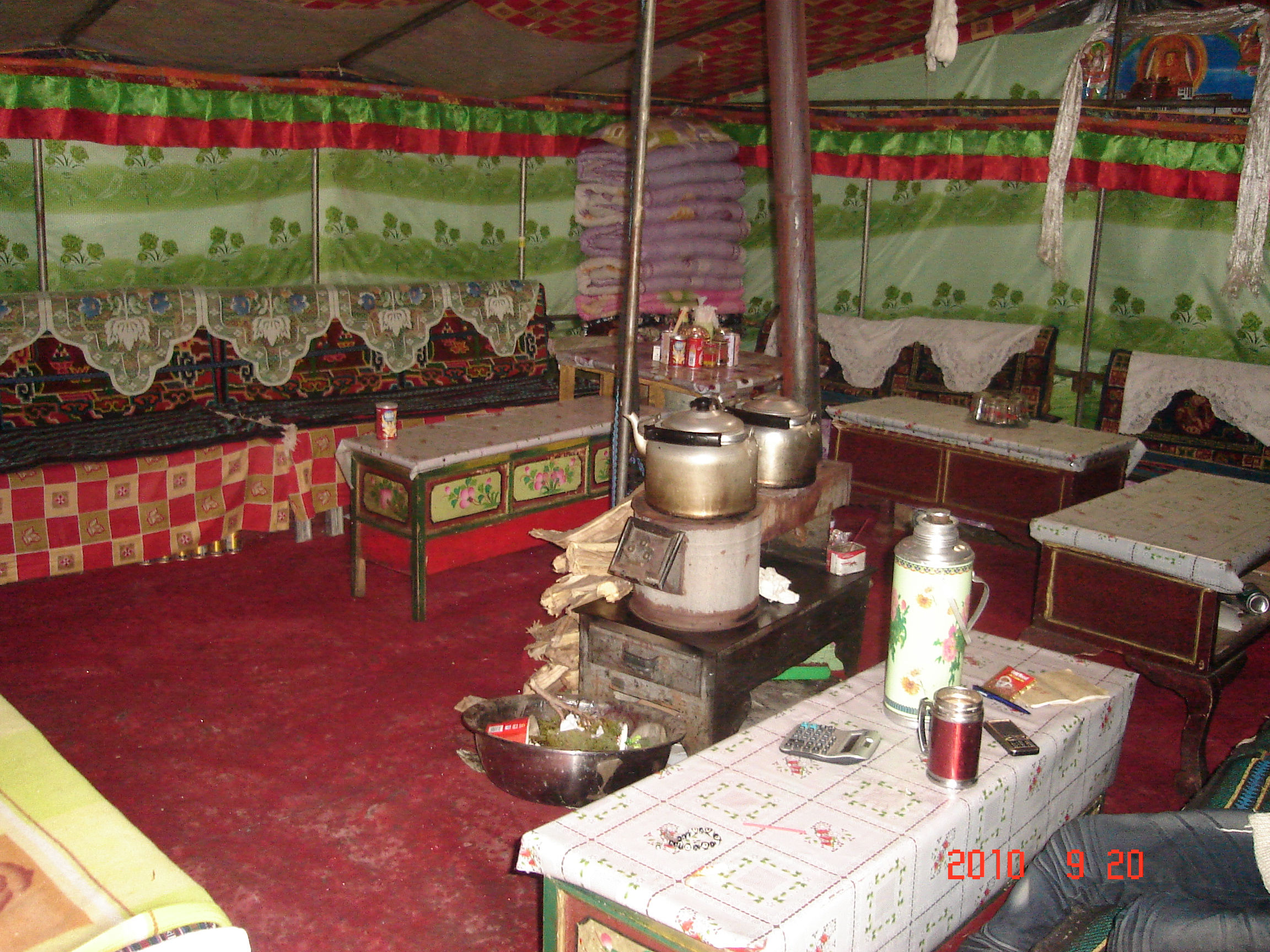
Interior of tea house/hotel located at Everest Base Camp, Tibet

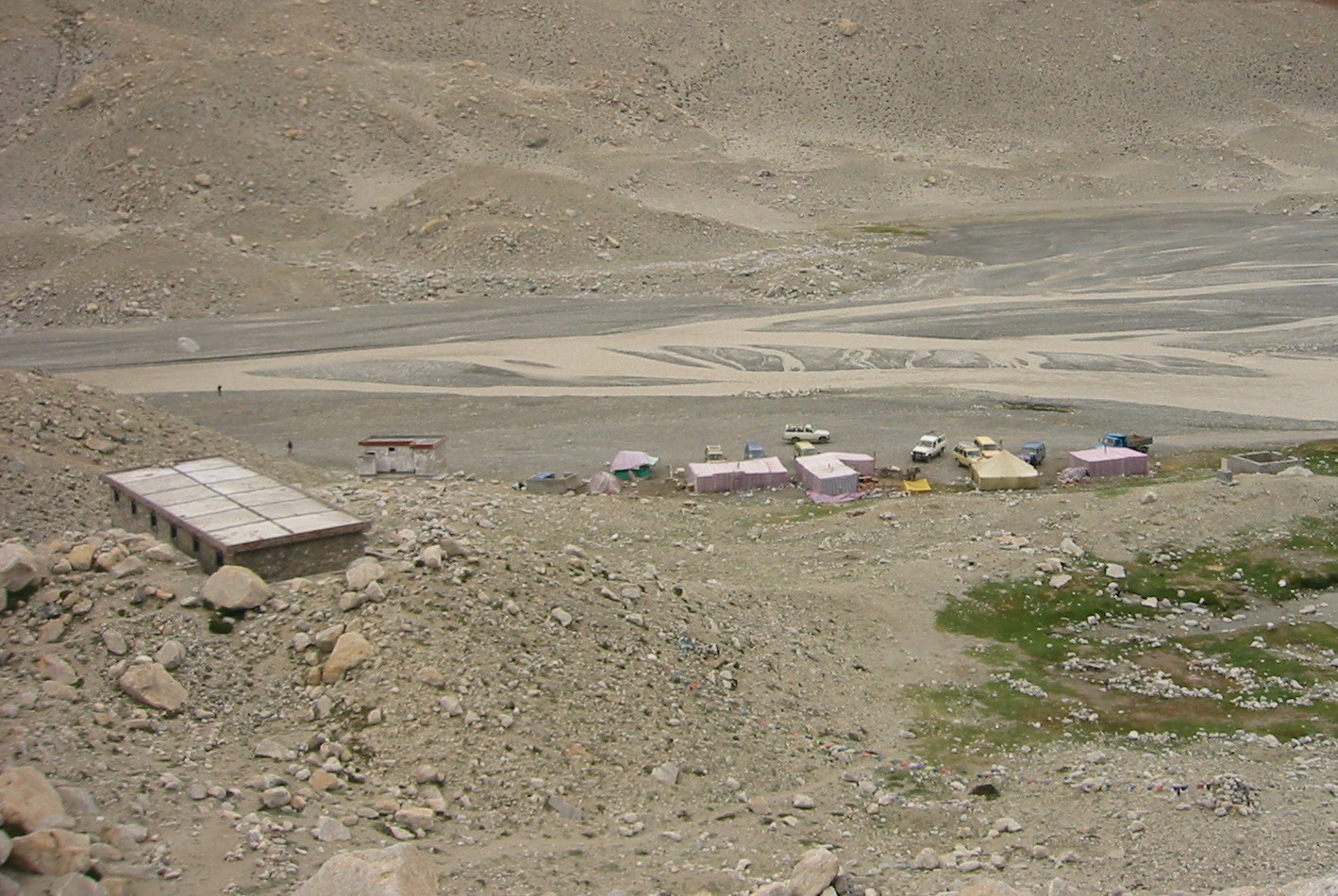
A view of Everest North Base Camp looking west, August 3, 2002. The permanent structure at left is for mountain climbers, central-left structure is for pit toilets, while the temporary wood-frame, plastic tarpaulin-covered structures below and right are for other visitors and support people.

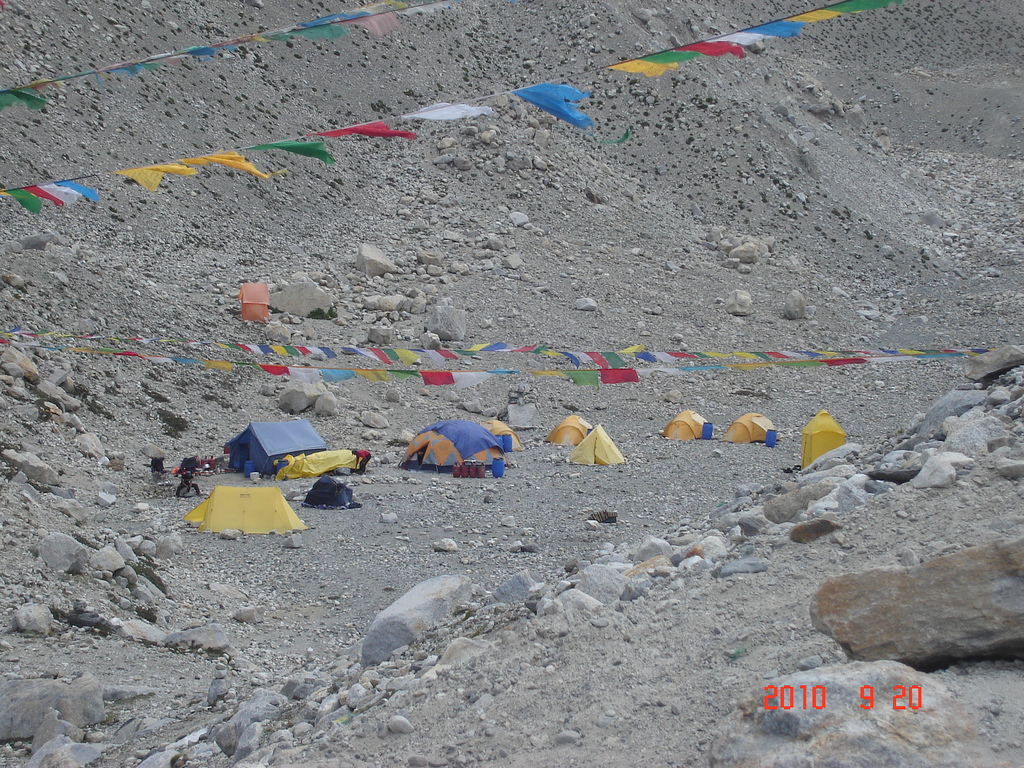
Climbers' tents in the restricted area beyond the area open to tourists

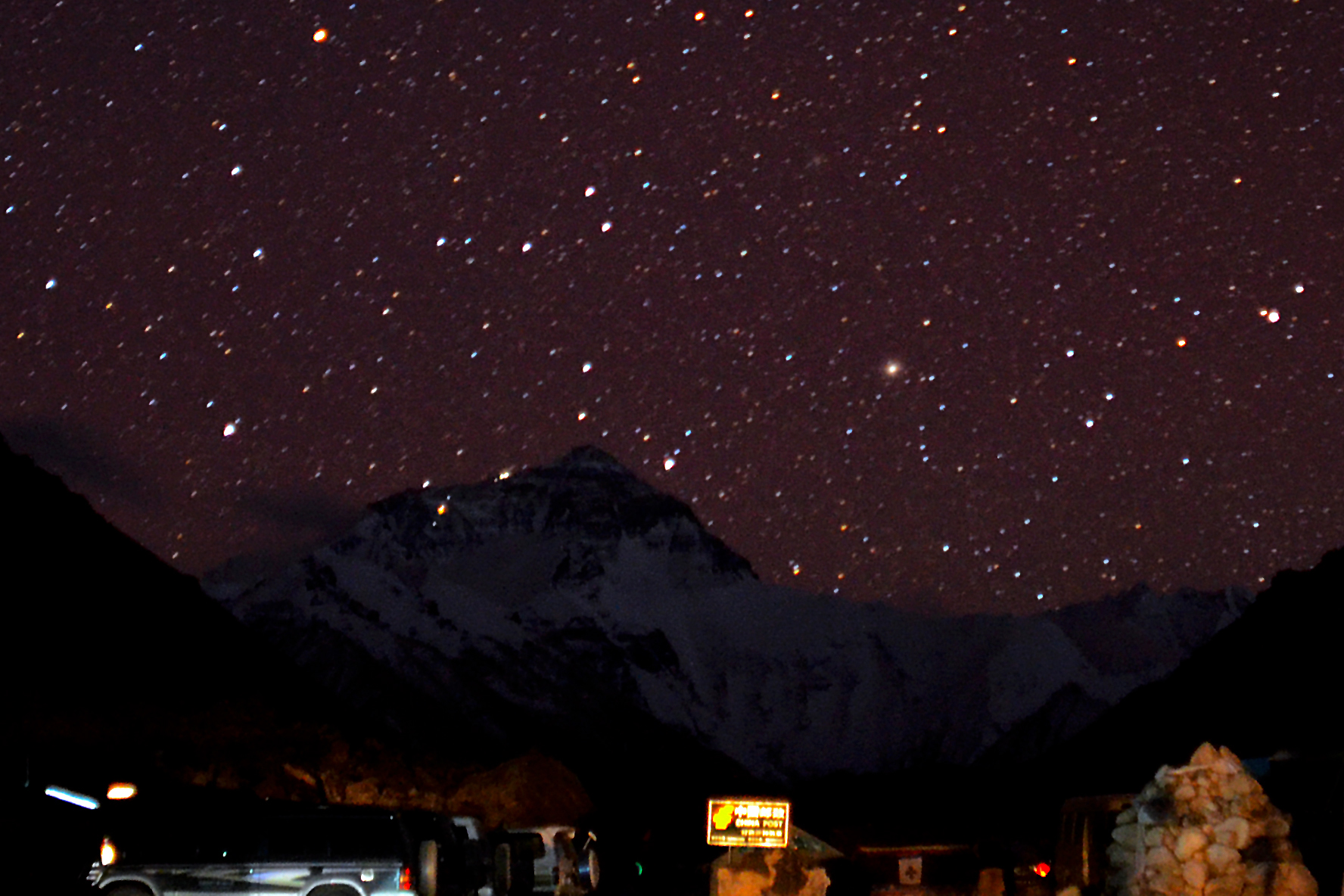
Camps visible on northeast ridge as seen from north tent village, Tibet on May 20, 2011
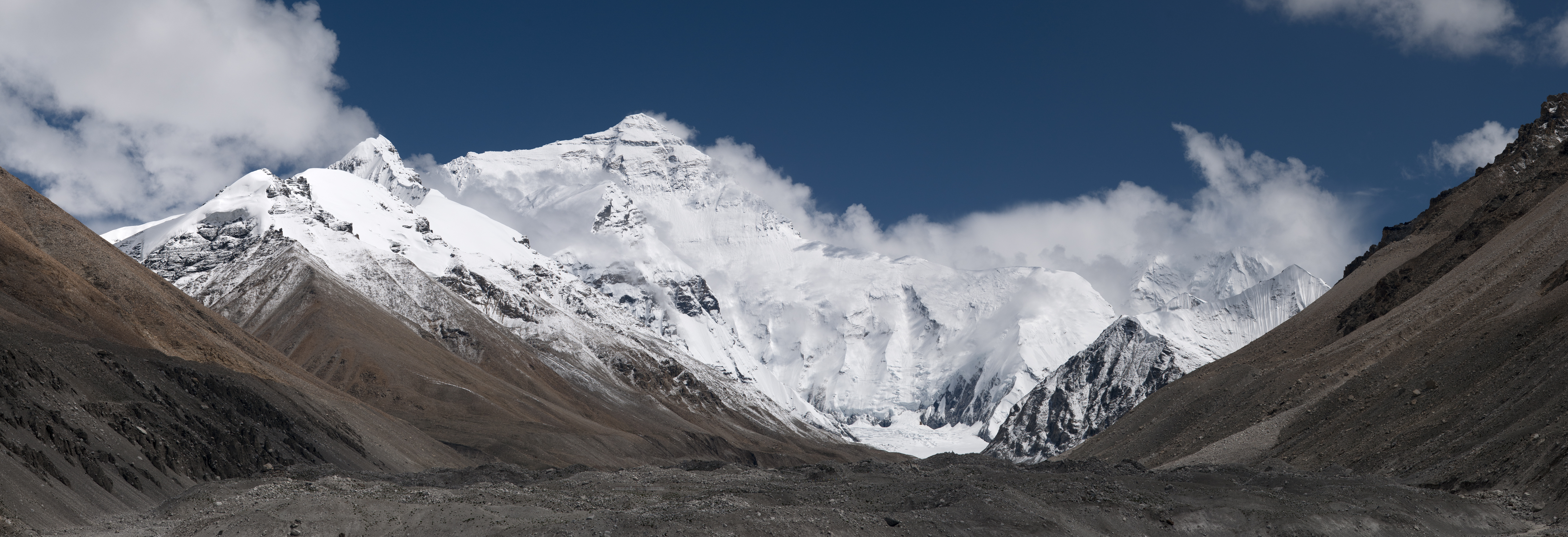
Looking south at the North face of Everest. Changzheng Ri to the left

== See also ==
- Gorakshep
- List of Mount Everest expeditions
- Timeline of the 1996 Mount Everest disaster
