= Mount Everest webcam =

Webcam recording a live broadcast of Mount Everest

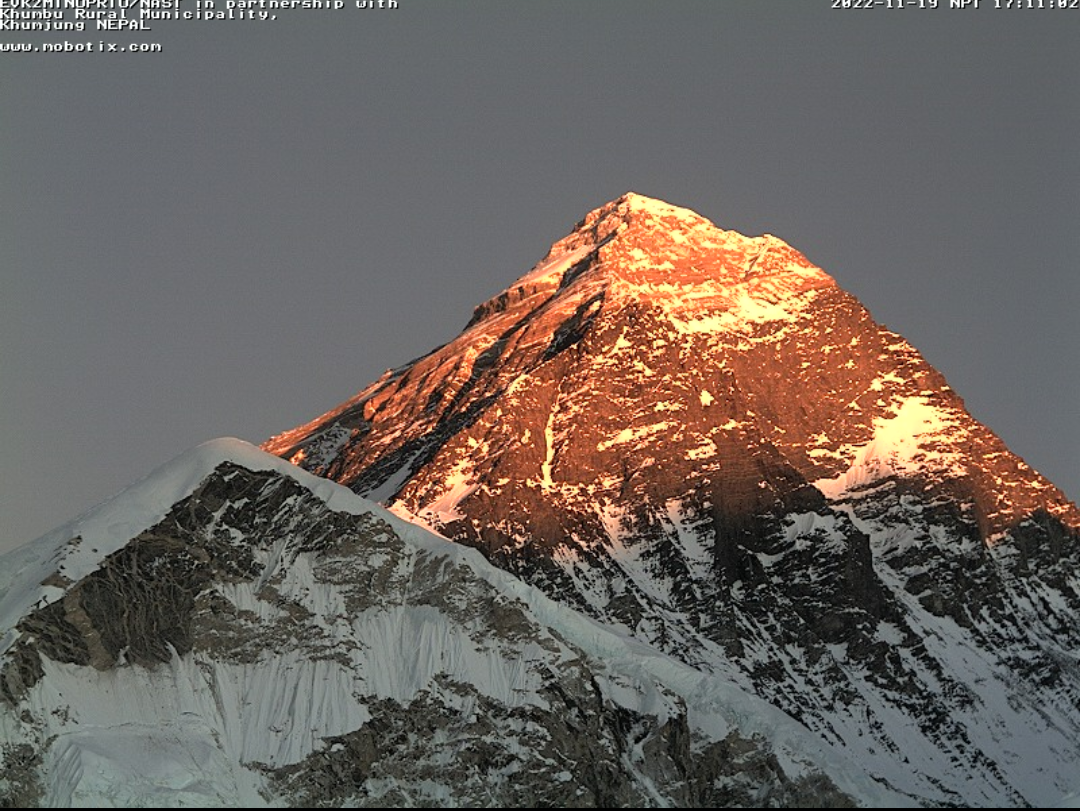
Everest alpenglow sunset from webcam

The Mount Everest Webcam (EWC) is the highest webcam in the world, located on Kala Patthar (5,675 metres or 18,619 ft), a mountain in Nepal directly facing Mount Everest.

== Features ==
It is a webcam located on Kala Patthar, a mountain in Nepal located in front of Everest, in the Himalayas Himalaya, at an elevation of 5,675 metres (18,619 ft). The webcam captures video footage of the summit of Mount Everest and is the highest webcam in the world. It was installed for the first time by Italian scientists as part of the EvK2CNR / NAST Piramide Observatory Laboratory project, which aims to collect scientific information and data on climate change, in particular as regards the physics and chemistry of atmosphere, the study of the evolution of glaciers, water and related phenomena, human health, vegetation and fauna in the Everest region, research related to seismology, geology and geophysics. Projects related to territorial development and capacity building are also active.

== Camera ==
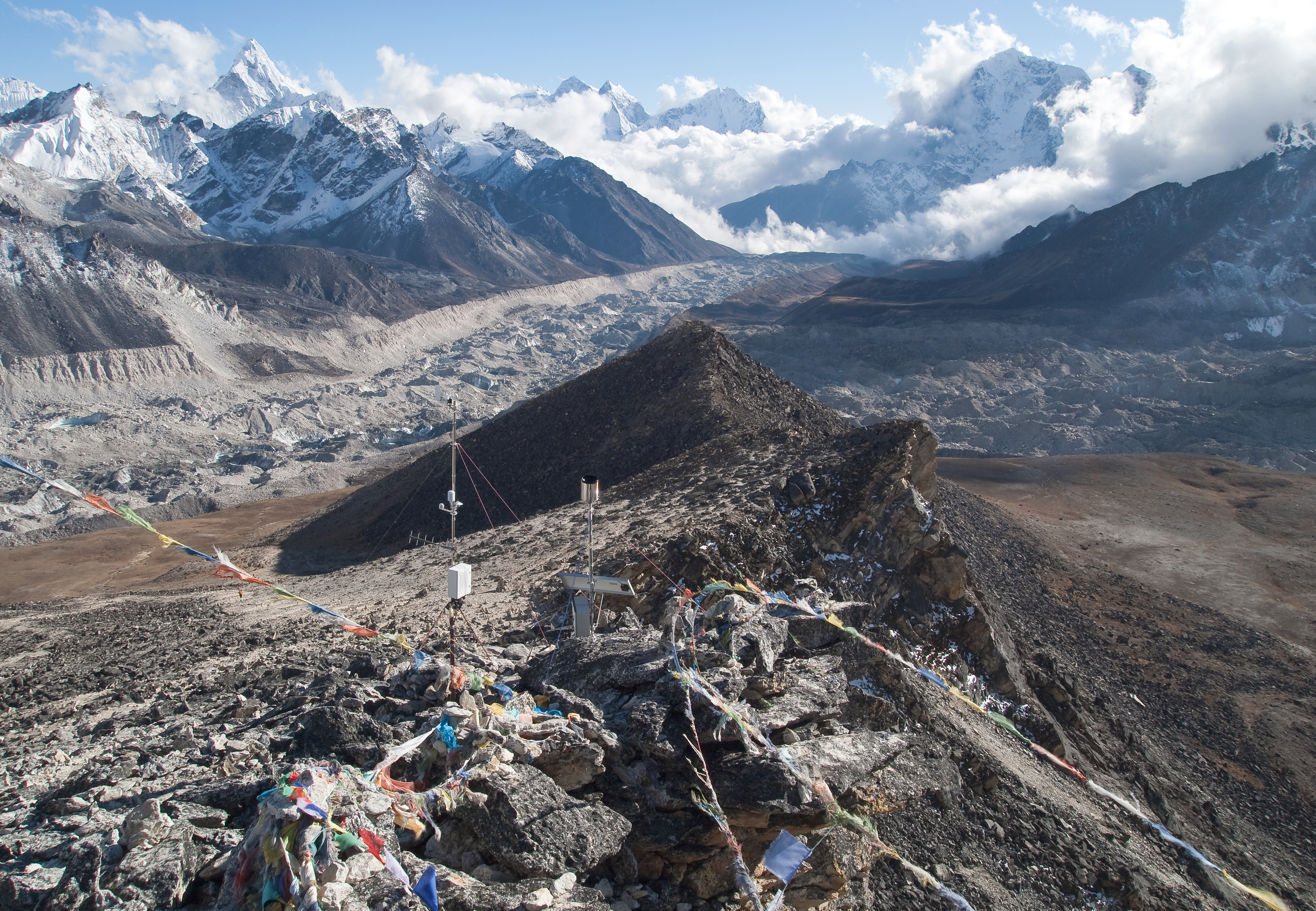
Communications and scientific equipment on Kala Patthar

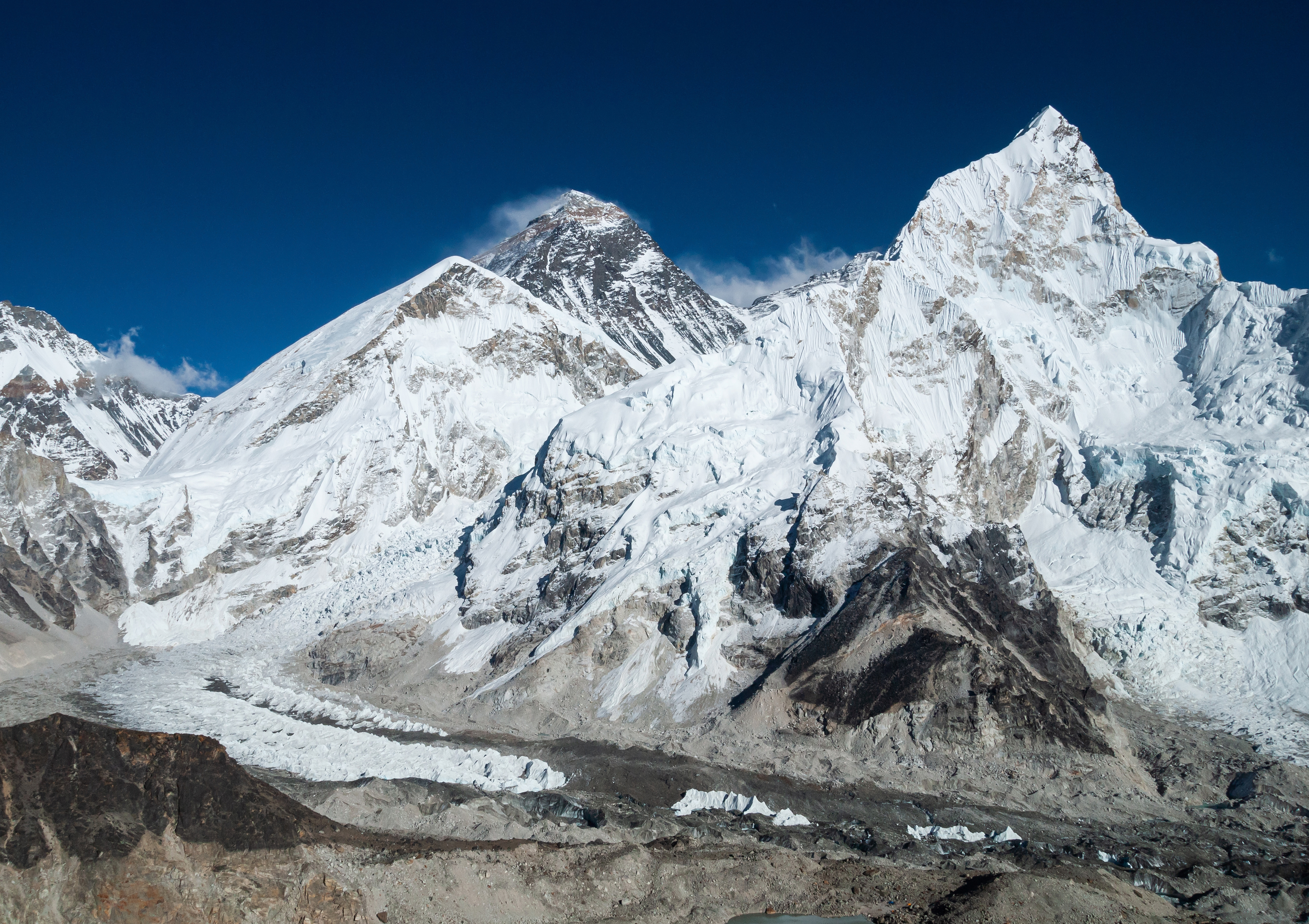
West Shoulder, Mount Everest and Nuptse from Kala Patthar

The camera is an M12-type model made by the German-based company Mobotix. The M12-type camera is powered by solar cells and operated from 6am to 6pm local time (UTC +5:45). It is capable of operating at temperatures as low as −30 °C (−22 °F) and broadcast its live, high-definition video worldwide via the Internet.

== Operation ==
The EWC operation support climatic data stored by Kala Pattar advanced automatic weather station (AAWS) designed and produced by Lsi-Lastem Italy.

The captured video and the weather data are transmitted wirelessly to the Ev-K2-CNR Pyramid Laboratory/Observatory, located on the slopes of Mount Everest at an elevation of 5,050 m (16,568 ft). The live video is analyzed in the observatory, then sent to Italy for further processing.

Last images are given daily as of December 2022.

== Location ==
Kala Patthar was chosen as the location for the webcam because of its excellent view of the summit of Mount Everest, including both the north and south-west faces as well as the west ridge.

== Highest webcam ==
As of December, 2022, it is the highest webcam in the world. When installed, it surpassed the previous record holder, at Capanna Regina Margherita Monte Rosa, Italy, at an elevation of 4,556 m (14,948 ft).
