= Kala Patthar =

Landmark near Pumori in the Nepali Himalayas

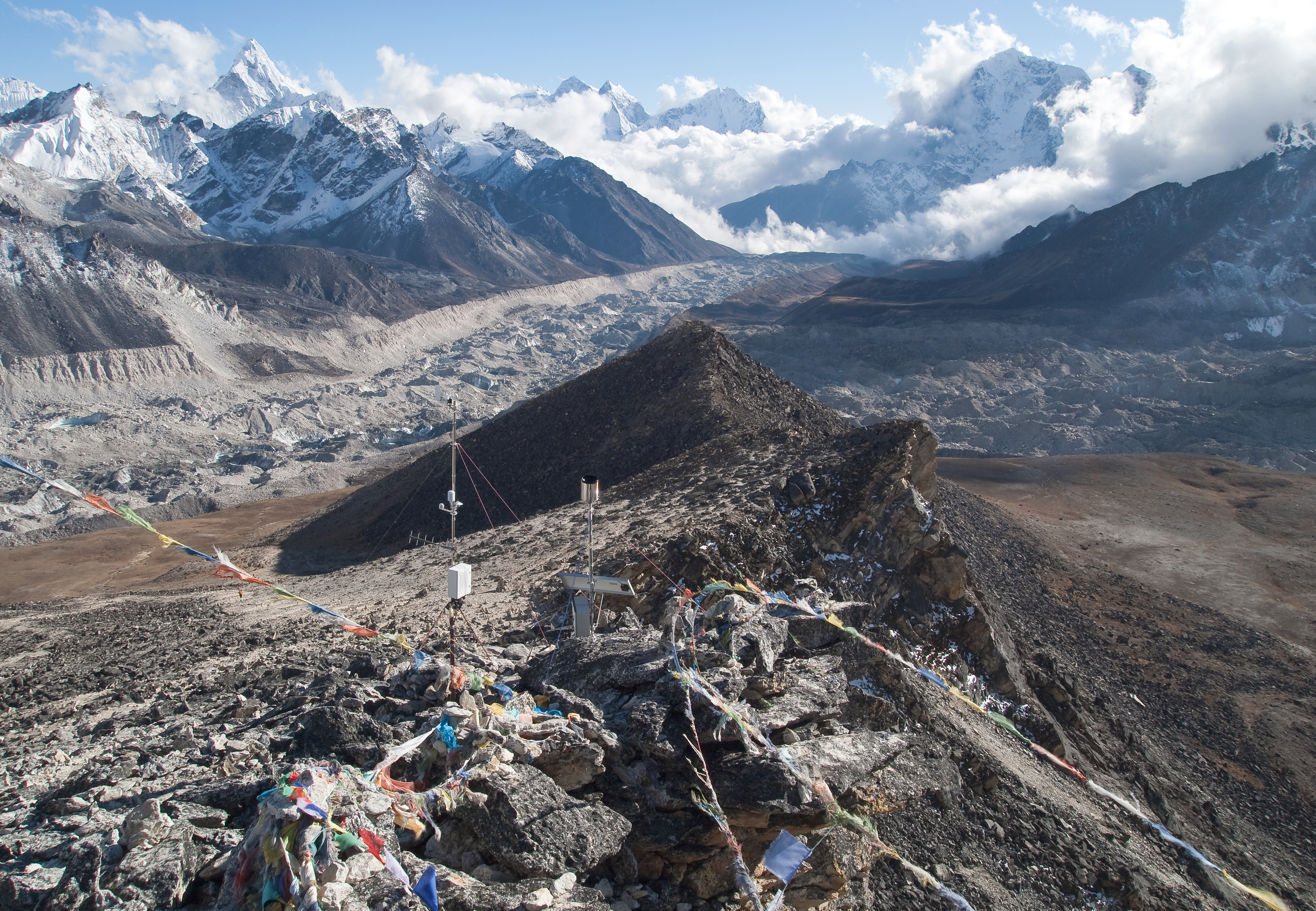
- View from Kala Patthar, the south ridge of Pumori Peak

Highest point
- Elevation: 5,644.5 m (18,519 ft)
- Coordinates: 27°59.750′N 86°49.705′E

Geography
- Location within Nepal
- Location: Khumbu, Nepal
- Parent range: Khumbu Himal

Climbing
- Easiest route: Hike / scramble from Gorakshep

Kala Patthar (Nepali: काला पत्थर, lit. 'black rock') is a notable landmark located on the south ridge of Pumori in the Nepali Himalayas above Gorakshep. Although not a proper mountain, with a prominence of only 10 m (33 ft), the ascent of Kala Patthar is very popular with trekkers in the region of Mount Everest since it provides the most accessible closeup view of Everest. Due to the structure of the Everest Massif, its high summit is blocked by Nuptse from much of the surrounding region.

The views of Everest, Nuptse and Changtse are spectacular from Kala Patthar and there are glimpses of the northern flank and summit of Lhotse. The world's highest webcam, Mount Everest webcam, was located here. Kala Patthar is considered the highest altitude most will reach without a climbing permit, which must be obtained in Kathmandu, at the Nepal Mountaineering Association.

== Description ==
The ascent of Kala Patthar begins at Gorakshep (5,163 m or 16,939 ft), the original base camp for Mt. Everest. After a brief dip to an ancient lake bed (which now contains a small lake and a helipad), the ascent makes its way up a series of steep switchbacks before levelling off somewhat as it traverses to the eastern side of the mountain. The trail then becomes steep once again until it reaches the wind-swept summit ridge. From there, a five to ten minute scramble over boulders takes one to the top, which is marked with prayer flags. There is also a geocaching trackable named Kala Pattar near the summit. Its trackable code is GCG58G. The full ascent usually takes between 1.5 and 2 hours. If the attempt is made starting from Lobuche, an additional two to three hours (one way) is required.

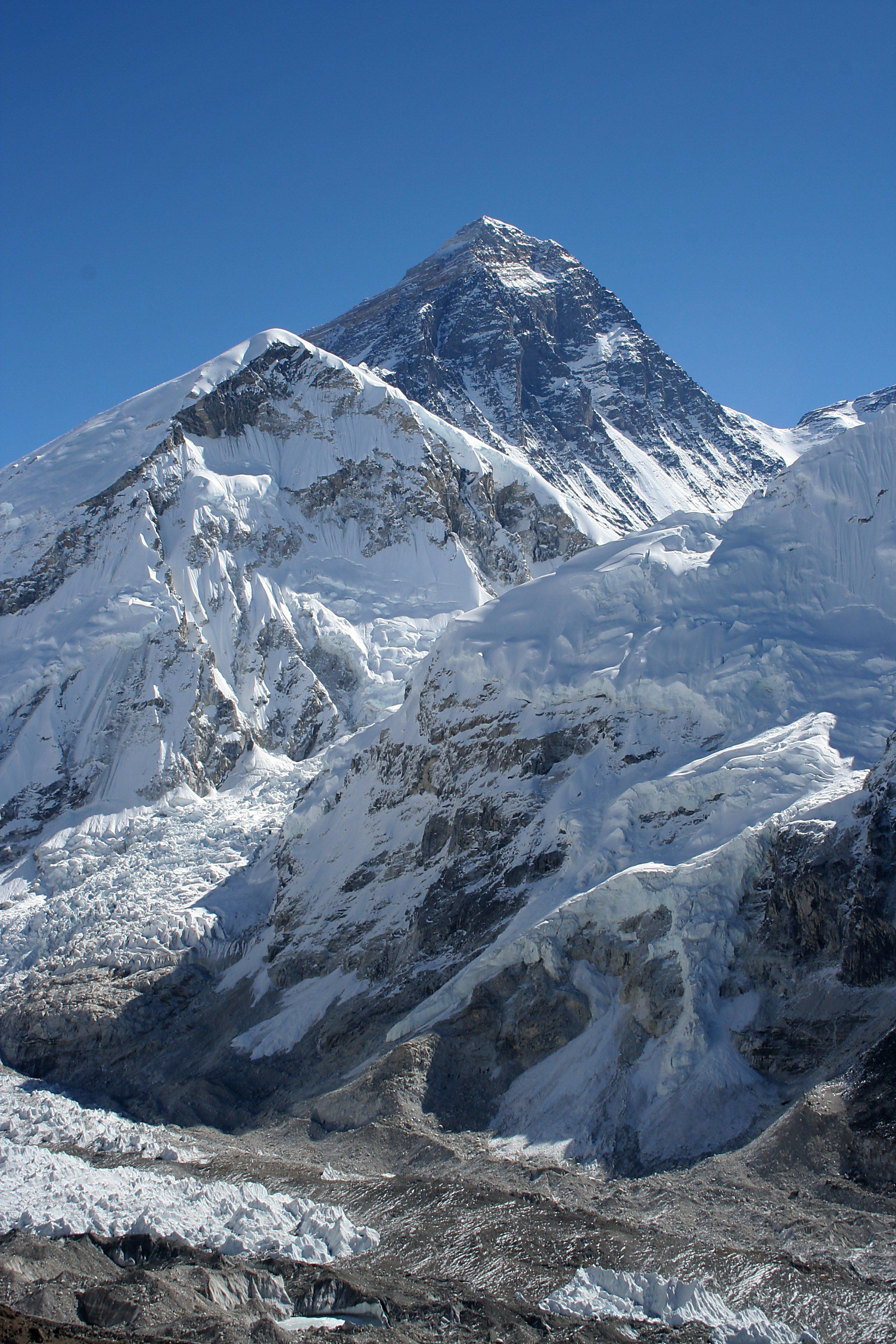
Mount Everest viewed from Kala Patthar

The elevation is commonly listed as 5,545–5,550 m (18,192–18,209 ft). One source lists the height as 5,600 meters/18,373 feet. Portland State University Assistant Professor Dr. Luis A. Ruedas took a Garmin eMap GPS unit to the summit on 6 December 2006. These units can average a series of individual satellite readings, making them more accurate than single-reading machines. Averaging 48 readings at 0625h Nepal local time, temperature −20 °C, the GPS recorded the location of the summit as 27°59.750'N, 86°49.705'E (datum: WGS84), and elevation as 5,643 m (18,514 ft). Even accounting for the fact that the summit may have approximately one meter of stones added as a celebratory cairn, this is a significant discrepancy with previously recorded elevations. The same unit was consistent concerning previously recorded elevations for Gorak Shep and Everest Base Camp. In October 2008, a GPS with WAAS recorded the summit at 27°59.751'N, 86°49.705'E (datum: WGS84) with an elevation of 5,644.5 m (18,519 ft), confirming the 2006 data.

It is possible that since Kala Patthar is merely a minor summit on a ridge leading to Pumori, different people may have measured different summits. There is a minor summit along this ridge near 27°59.51'N, 86°49.62'E with an elevation of approximately 5,545 m (18,192 ft). The summit traditionally referred to as Kala Patthar is, however, completely festooned with prayer flags, making it quite readily recognizable. It is that summit that was recorded as 5,643 m (18,514 ft). It is quite clear that the point trekkers climb to is a local maxima on the Pumori ridge, not the summit of Kala Patthar proper. This point is clearly higher than the summit of Kala Patthar, but the name has remained in popular use.

== Climate change ==
In December 2009, Madhav Kumar Nepal and the Nepali Cabinet held a short cabinet meeting at the base of Kala Patthar as a response to climate change.

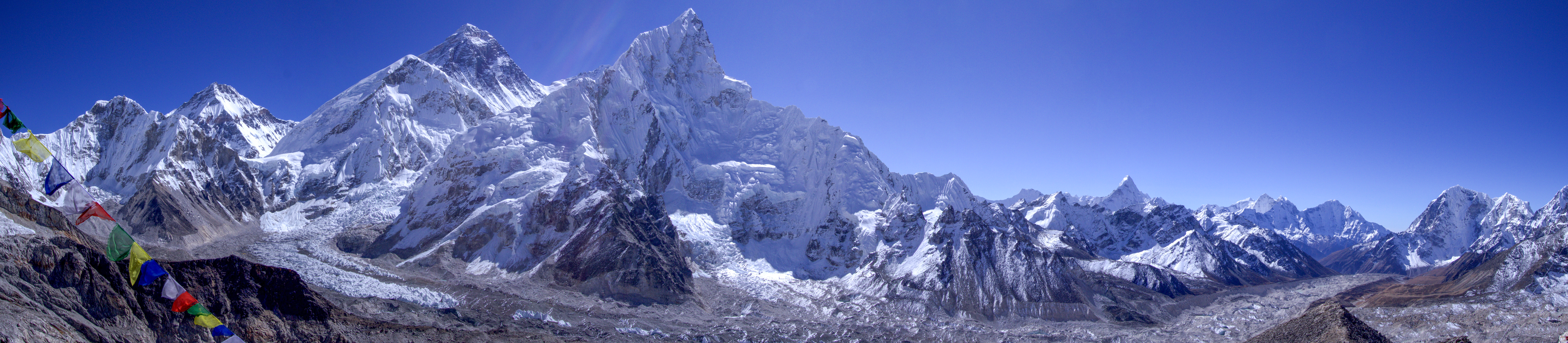
Panoramic view from Kala Patthar, including Mount Everest
