= Gorakshep =

Gorakshep गोरकशेप, गोरक्षेप Gorak Shep
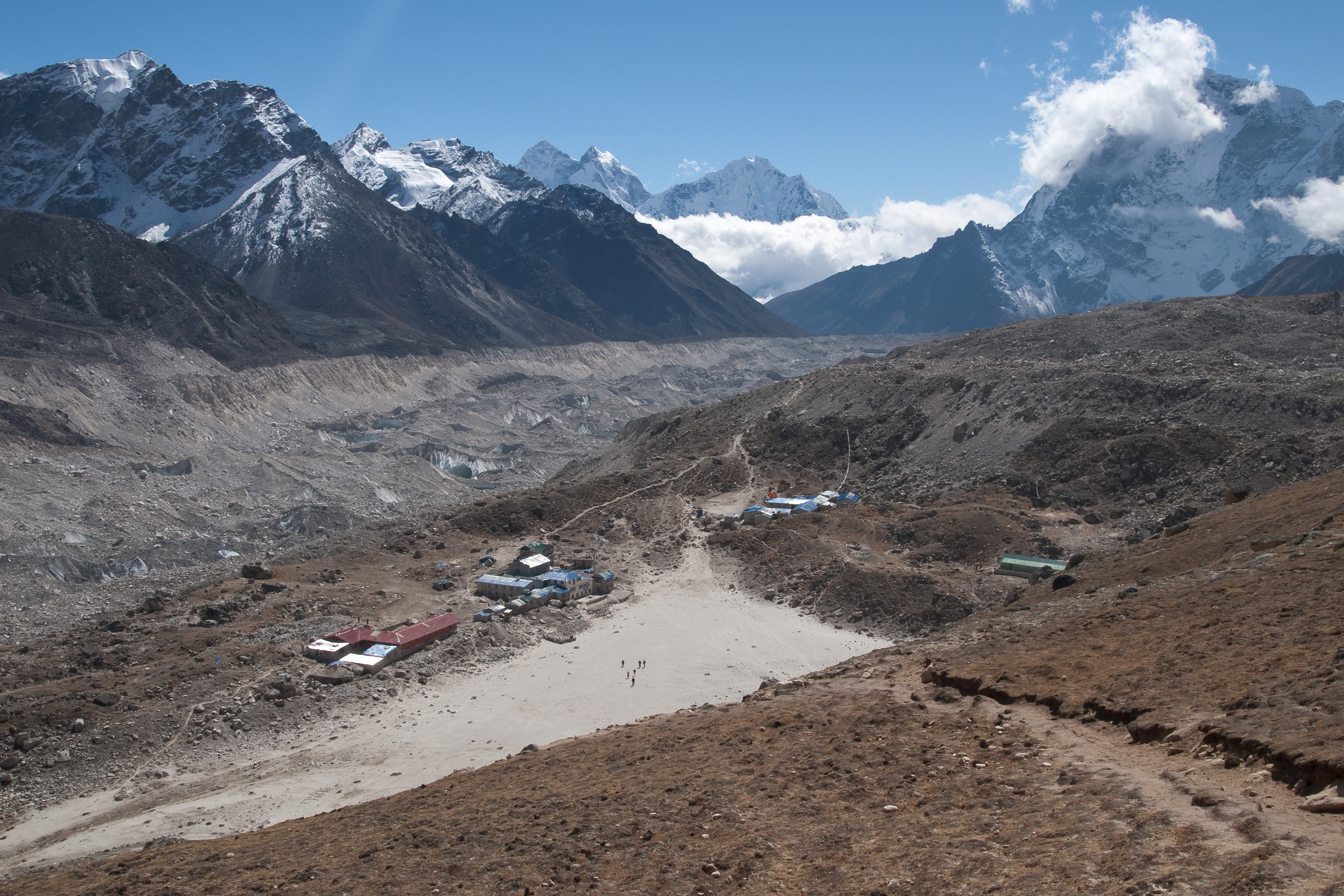
- View of Gorak Shep and Khumbu Glacier

- Location within Nepal Location within Tibet
- Coordinates: 27°58′50″N 86°49′43″E

Gorak Shep, also spelled Gorakshep (Nepali: गोरकशेप, गोरक्षेप), is a settlement nestled on the periphery of a frozen lakebed blanketed with sand in Nepal, sharing its name with the locale. Situated at an elevation of 5,164 meters (16,942 feet) near Mount Everest, it remains uninhabited for most of the year, reopening only for the Mount Everest trekking season.

== Trekking ==
Gorak Shep is inside the Sagarmatha National Park, the homeland of the Sherpa people, famous for their skills as guides and mountaineers. It is the final stop on most common treks to Everest Base Camp from Lukla, following what the Dalai Lama dubbed "the steps to heaven."

This route takes trekkers from Lukla to Namche Bazaar, Tengboche, Pangboche, Dingboche, Lobuche, and on to Gorak Shep. Most trekkers stay overnight there, as their trekking permits will not allow them to camp at Everest Base Camp. Gorak Shep is the last village with accommodation on the Everest base camp trek.

Gorak Shep was the original Everest Base Camp, being used by the Swiss mountain climbers in their attempt to climb the Everest in 1952. Later the camp was moved closer to the mountain, just below the Khumbu Ice Fall. Climbing time from Gorak Shep to the Everest Base Camp ranges from 1.5 to 2.5 hours, depending on the weather, acclimatization and physical conditioning of each individual.

At this altitude, few people feel comfortable and many start to suffer symptoms of altitude sickness or acute mountain sickness (AMS).

Gorak Shep also provides a base for ascent of Kala Patthar, 5,550 meters (18,209 ft) which provides both views of Everest and the highest altitude that most will reach without a climbing permit from the Nepal Mountaineering Association.

Gorakshep
- Location within Nepal Location within Tibet
- Coordinates: 27°59′00″N 86°50′00″E
- Type: frozen lake

== Climate ==
The best times for trekking are in spring (March and April) and autumn (October and November), when Everest visibility is ideal and the temperature is not excessively cold. In autumn, competition for bed spaces in the lodges can be intense and some trekkers may need to sleep on the floor of the dining room lodge because inability to get a lodge.

During the winter, in the months from December to February, it is possible to do trekking, but the vast majority of accommodations are closed, the trails are snow-covered and the cold is very intense.

Gorak Shep means "dead ravens," because of the complete lack of any kind of vegetation in the area.

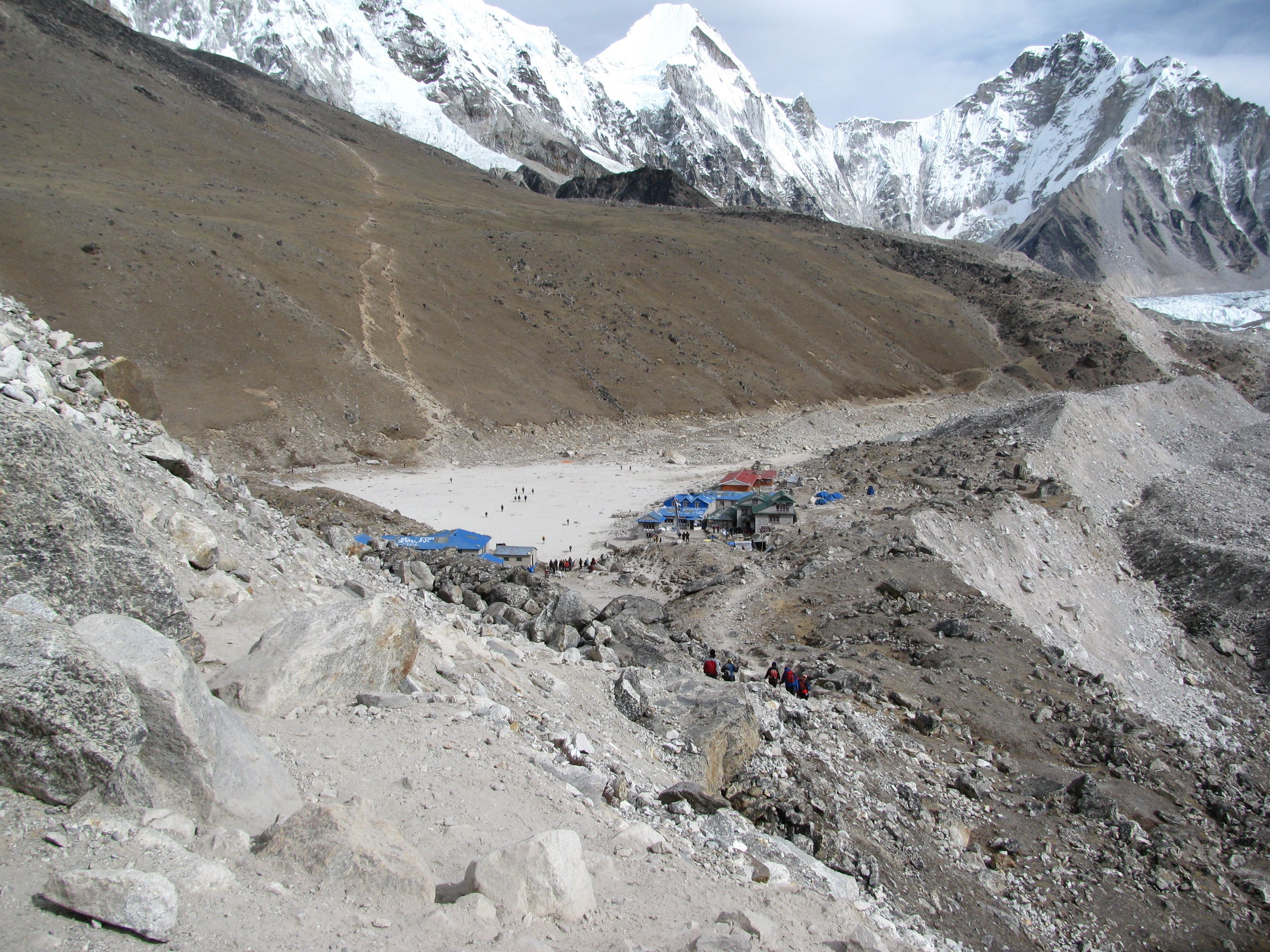
Approaching Gorak Shep from the South

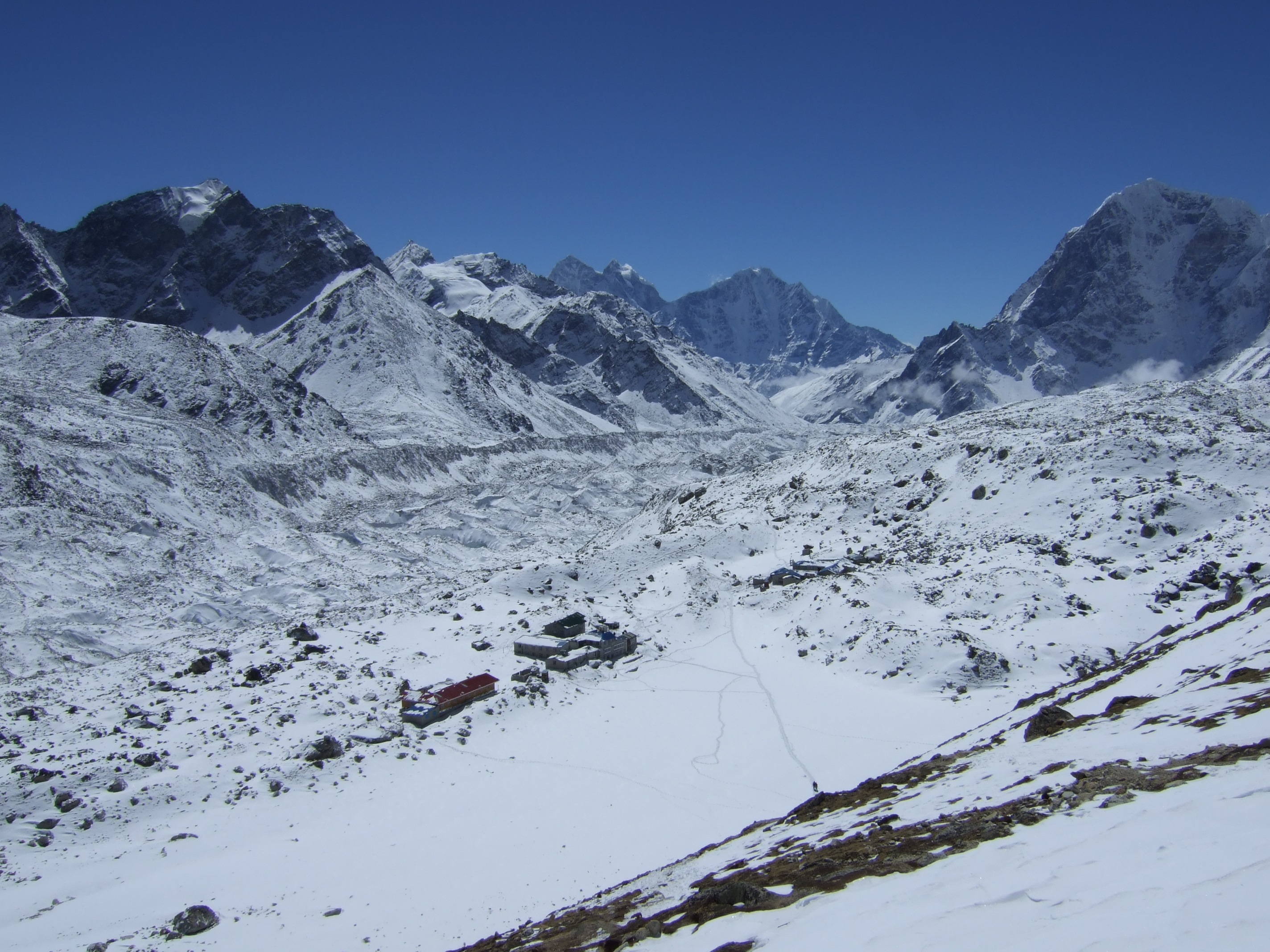
View of Gorak Shep from the North, half-way up Kala Patthar

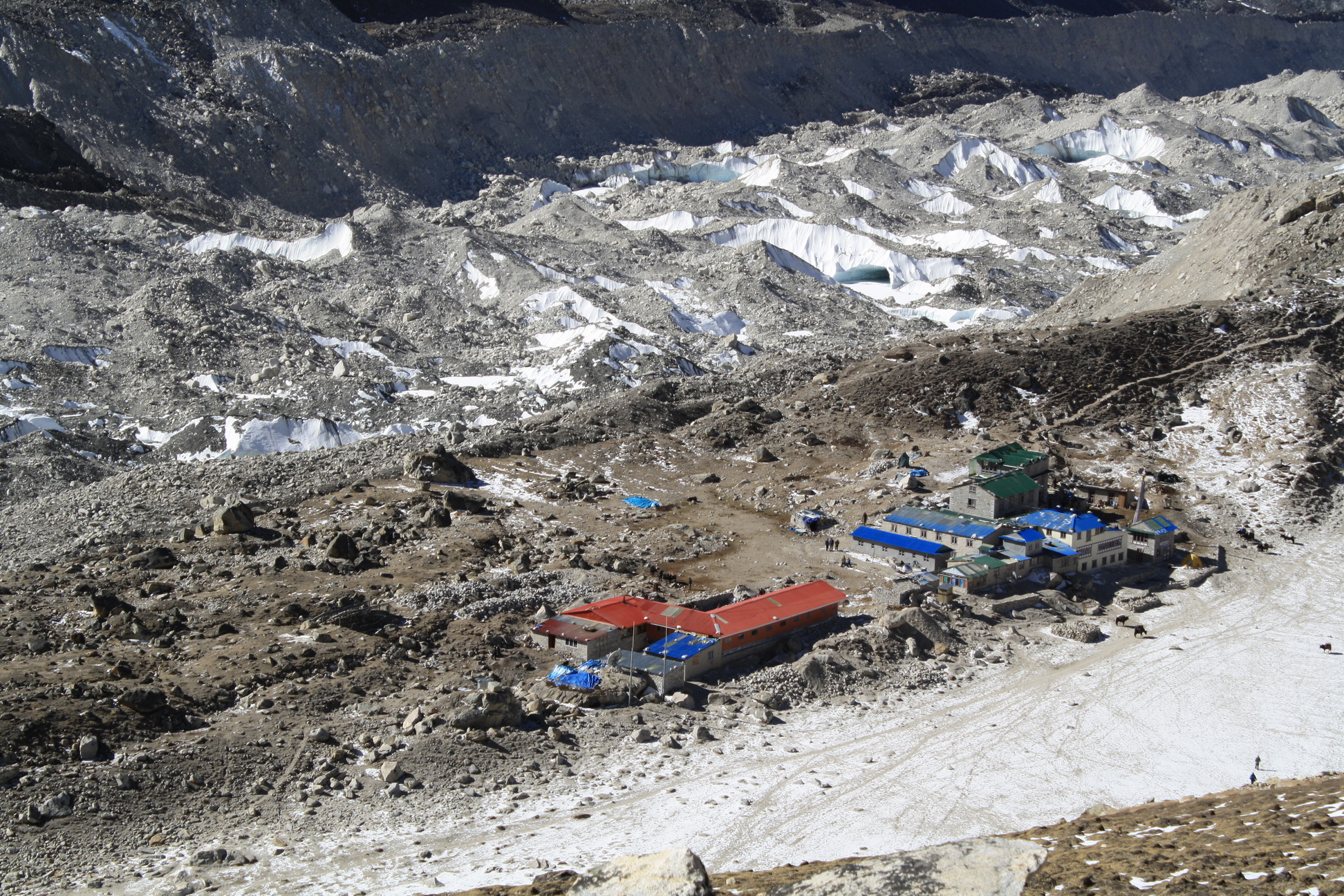
Looking down on Gorak Shep, Khumbu behind it

== Last village in Khumbu Region ==
Ghorakshep is the last village in the Khumbu region. Due to the global warming in the near future Ghorakshep might collapse due to melting of glacier.

== Transportation ==
Gorakshep has no road access, and transportation is mainly by trekking routes and helicopter services. Trekkers normally reach the settlement on foot from Lobuche as part of the route toward Everest Base Camp and Kala Patthar. A helipad located near the lodges provides air access to the village, which lies at an elevation of about 5,164 metres. Helicopter services from Gorakshep connect with Lukla and Kathmandu and are also used for evacuation and return transportation after completing the Everest Base Camp trek. The flight to Lukla takes about 25 minutes, while flights toward Kathmandu take around 90 minutes depending on weather, routing and operational conditions.

== Panoramic view ==
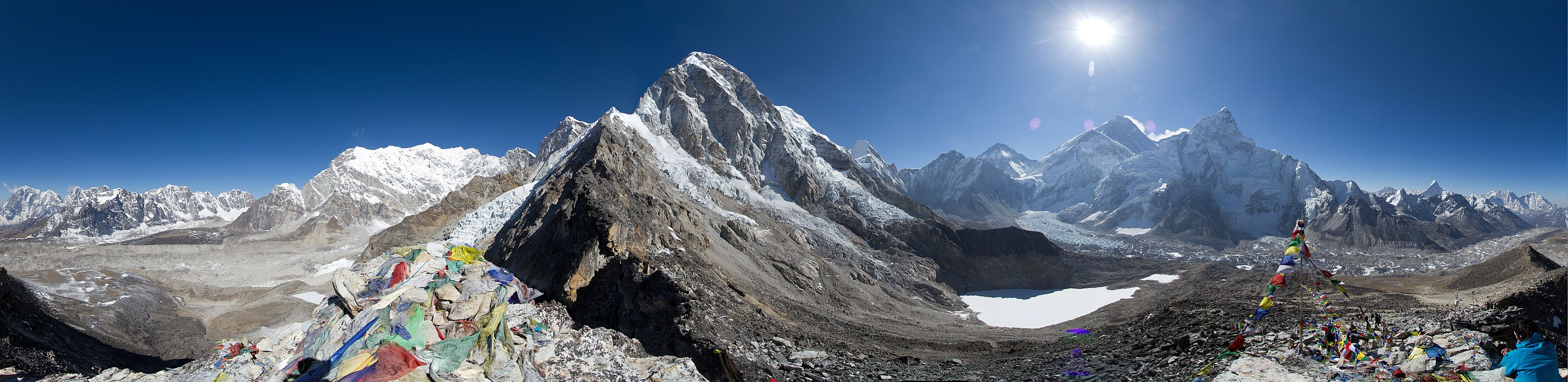
Panoramic view of Sagarmatha National Park - Gorak Shep to Pheriche. Photo taken from Kala Patthar (5,590 m / 18,340 feet).

== See also ==
- La Rinconada, Peru - the highest elevation year-round human habitation in the world at 5,100 m (16,730 feet).
