= Dan Bryant (mountaineer) =

New Zealand climber of Mount Everest

Dan Bryant on the 1935 Everest expedition

Leslie Vickery Bryant, known as Dan Bryant (29 March 1905 – 10 December 1957), was a New Zealand school teacher and a mountain climber. He was a member of the 1935 British Mount Everest reconnaissance expedition, which was a preliminary to the full expedition of 1936 that attempted the summit. However in 1935 Bryant did not acclimatise well to altitude above 23,000 feet (7,000 m), and so was not included in the party for 1936. He was a very accomplished ice climber, and was well-liked on expeditions. These two factors led, indirectly, to his compatriot Edmund Hillary becoming a member of the successful 1953 British Mount Everest expedition.

== Teaching and New Zealand climbing ==
Born in 1905, Dan Bryant graduated at the University of Auckland in 1927 and his first job was at New Plymouth Boys' High School, near the 8,261 feet (2,518 m) Mount Taranaki (known in his day as Mount Egmont). He was a keen mountaineer and took parties of school pupils on expeditions on the mountain. After four years he moved to South Island and for 16 years taught at four other schools, all close to much higher mountains. At the same time he developed his own climbing skills, particularly concerning ice climbing. With his climbing partner Rod Syme on Mount Tasman in 1933, he pioneered an ice arete route now known as Syme's Ridge. With another partner Lud Mahan he was the first to reach the summit via an ice ridge that is now regarded as one of the most difficult routes up the mountain.

== Europe ==
In 1934 he went to Europe and while attending the London School of Economics he did a great deal of solo climbing in the Alps. This let him meet other climbers and with whom he joined for expeditions. He discovered that his techniques on ice stood good comparison with European climbers, partly because he was used to worse weather conditions. With an American climber he met, Paul Petzoldt, he climbed the Matterhorn in four hours, descended on the Italian side in another four for lunch, and then reversed the traverse to Switzerland all in one day. He reported no problems with altitude.

== Everest reconnaissance ==
Eric Shipton led the 1935 British Mount Everest reconnaissance accompanied by Bill Tilman and a small team on an "alpine-style" expedition. The purpose was not to reach the summit (indeed the remit specifically excluded that) but was to reconnoitre the North Col route in post-monsoon conditions and to carry out wider mountain exploration. On the recommendation of Colin G. (Ferdie) Crawford who had been on the 1922 and 1933 British Mount Everest expeditions, Bryant was invited to take part, so making him the first New Zealander to go on a Himalayan mountaineering expedition. After resigning from Palmerston North Boys' High School, Bryant sailed from Auckland to Bombay via Sydney and then went by train to Darjeeling where he joined up with the rest of the party.

=== March-in ===
They set off on 24 May 1935 and on the march-in the party was affected by altitude sickness, even at a height of 12,800 feet (3,900 m) while still in Sikkim, with Bryant particularly badly hit to the extent of vomiting. Shipton and Bryant were so ill that the march was delayed and they then needed extra mules to carry them personally. By 12 June they reached the Nyonno Ri range near Sar. These mountains were to be explored for the first time but Bryant, who had not been able to keep down any food or drink for two days reluctantly took his team's advice to trek back down to Sar where he recovered after a few days. Many of the rest of the party were themselves not at all well. On 17 June he set off again by himself and next day reached 20,000 feet (6,100 m) where he met one of his party's groups who were amazed to find him so well. The entire party, after recuperating at Sar, headed for the Everest region on 26 June.

They reached the river Phung Chu where the bridge was a 100-foot (30 m) yak-hide rope from which a wooden frame was suspended for carrying people and loads. They found the frame was on the far side of the river and there was no rope attached. Bryant volunteered to cross by crawling along under the rope but the friction burnt his leg so badly he dropped off just before he reached the far side. However he reached the shore and attached a new rope to the frame. From there Bryant had to ride a pony because his leg was too painful for walking – he would have been much safer on foot. Despite all this, Bryant kept up his spirits and also cheered up the rest of his party. In the evenings Tilman, who was normally extremely taciturn, would be "almost in hysetrics" listening to Bryants anecdotes about Shipton.

=== East Rongbuk Glacier ===
After Rongbuk Monastery Bryant became concerned he was again being affected by the altitude but he stayed with his colleagues in ascending the East Rongbuk Glacier which was a double march on foot to Camp I. The whole team were unwell with Shipton being the fittest. On 7 July, when the others went further up the glacier, Bryant had to recuperate at camp I and two days later he descended to Base Camp near Rongbuk where he found he had lost 14 pounds (6.4 kg) weight in three days. He left Rongbuk on 13 July feeling "really first class" and reached the foot of the North Col on 15 July, though he returned to Camp II where he met the others the next day. They had reached the North Col but the snow and weather had stopped them getting substantially further towards the summit. He joined Tilman and Edmund Wigram in attempting to climb the 23,665-foot (7,213 m) Khartaphu but he had to stop at an intermediate camp while the others tried unsuccessfully to reach the summit. (Note: The party had divided into three teams and another team reached the summit by a different route.) The expedition doctor, Charles Warren, suggested to Bryant that his problem might be kidney disease or a congenital heart problem and advised seeing a consultant when he got home.

With the entire party together again, Bryant's tent became the rendezvous with all seven squeezing into a two-man tent while anecdotes were told and plans and experiences discussed. Bryant's good humour and Shipton's ploy of splitting the party into varying small teams for different expeditions both contributed to people later remembering this as one of the most enjoyable expeditions they had ever been on.

=== West Rongbuk Glacier ===
On 3 August the party split for various expeditions with Bryant and Shipton heading up the West Rongbuk Glacier to make first ascents of Lingtren and its outliers and Lingtrennup. Bryant was no longer ill and was able to enjoy the expedition fully. They reached an unnamed col between Lingtren and Pumori on 9 August 1935 but, despite waiting several hours, mist prevented any view of the Cwm. They again reached the col on 11 August and on this occasion the mist cleared after many hours and they were able to get the first photograph to clearly show the Western Cwm with the Khumbu Icefall descending. Bryant wrote "A westerly spur of Nuptse curled round to the north thus squeezing the glacier of the upper basin into a narrow lip over which it poured in a gigantic ice-fall, a wild tumble of contorted ice, to the Khumbu Glacier 2,000 feet below. The cwm itself must be an amazing place, completely ringed in as it is, except for that narrow entrance, by a mountain wall nowhere less than 25,000 feet high." Shipton said of the route up the Icefall and Cwm "it did not look impossible, and I should very much like to have the opportunity one day of exploring it". As they were finally descending Lingtren along a narrow ridge of ice they broke through a cornice and Bryant fell over 500 feet (150 m). Fortunately, Shipton was able to hold the rope and Bryant, who had retained his ice axe, managed to climb back.

=== Changtse and return via Kharta ===
The entire party met up on at Rongbuk on 14 August from where they all attempted the 24,730-foot (7,540 m) Changtse but had to give up at 23,000 feet (7,000 m) because of snow, although Bryant had had to turn back earlier.

They then headed back east, not going directly to Kharta but climbing a considerable number of mountains over 20,000 feet (6,100 m) during which Bryant had no altitude problems and had "never felt fitter". Counting over the entire expedition, they had climbed 26 peaks over 20,000 feet (6,100 m) (24 of them climbed for the first time) and Bryant had climbed 10 (8 for the first time). Beyond Kharta, on the trek back to Sikkim they reach a rope bridge where, for a bet, Bryant swam across the torrent. This amazed the Sherpas who, although very adept at wading (even when carrying the Europeans on their backs), had never seen or heard of anyone swimming.

Bryant set sail from Calcutta to New Zealand, via Singapore, on 1 October. He wrote afterwards "These had been four and a half glorious months amid the grandest mountains in the world attempting work which must appeal to all mountaineers, working with men whose mountaineering ability was beyond all praise, and whose companionship is something to be treasured throughout life."

Bryant and Tilman had not acclimatised to altitudes above about 23,000 feet (7,000 m), though Tilman had not suffered so badly. For this reason neither was included on the full-scale 1936 summit expedition. However, Tilman soon showed that any failure was not necessarily consistent – in 1936 he led an expedition that reached the summit of Nanda Devi at 25,646 feet (7,817 m) which at that time was the highest summit ever reached, assuming that Mallory and Irvine hadn't made it to the summit of Mount Everest in 1924.

== Return to New Zealand ==
Bryant resumed teaching in the South Island and in 1938 made the first ascent of Mount Cook by its east ridge. That year he took a Carnegie Educational Fellowship at London University, returning to New Zealand teaching for most of World War II. He got married in 1941 and in 1946 was appointed head teacher at an Auckland high school. Although further from the mountains, he continued climbing and taking pupils on expeditions. He wrote a book New Zealanders and Everest, published in 1953. (Note: He published his book and journal articles as "L. V. Bryant".) In 1957 Bryant was killed in a road traffic accident.

In 1951 Shipton was appointed as leader of another reconnaissance of the Everest approaches, this time from Nepal. Remembering Bryant's climbing skills and good humour, which he ascribed to his New Zealand heritage, and hearing of Ed Hillary's success on his first Himalayan expedition, he invited Hillary to join the party. It was Hillary's success there that led to his inclusion in the 1953 British Mount Everest expedition.
