= Lingtren =

Himalayan mountain

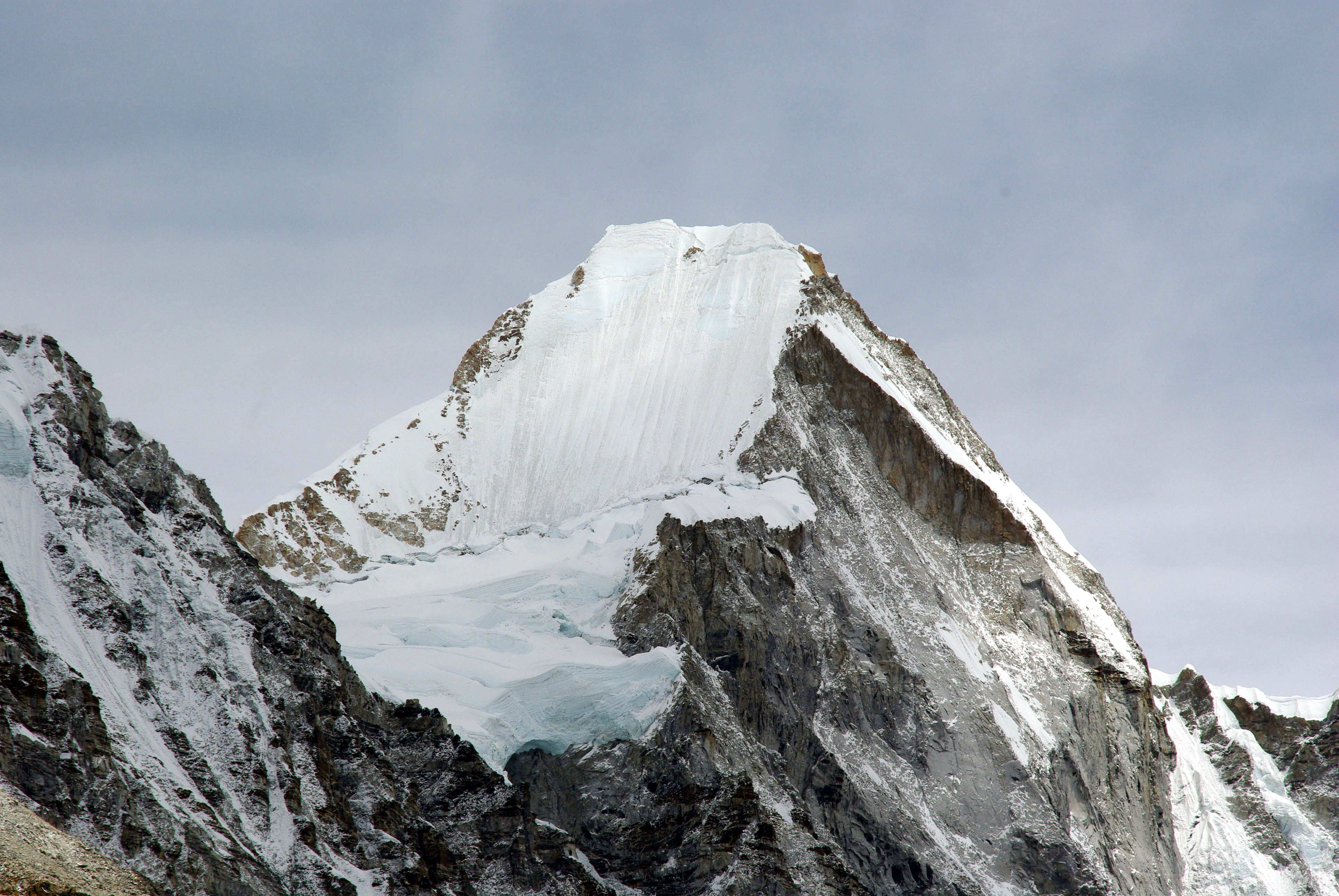
- Lingtren's south face above the Pumori-Lingtren col

Highest point
- Elevation: 6,749 m (22,142 ft)
- Prominence: 593 m (1,946 ft)
- Parent peak: Pumori
- Coordinates: 28°01′N 86°51′E

Geography
- Location within Koshi Province Location within Nepal Location within Tibet
- Location: Solukhumbu District, Sagarmatha Zone, Nepal; Tingri County, Shigatse Prefecture, Tibet Autonomous Region, China
- Parent range: Mahalangur Himal, Himalayas

Climbing
- First ascent: 1935 by Eric Shipton & Dan Bryant
- Easiest route: glacier/snow/ice from West Rongbuk Glacier

Lingtren (Nepali: लिङ्ट्रेन), 6,749 metres (22,142 ft), is a mountain in the Mahalangur Himal area of Himalaya, about 8 kilometres (5.0 mi) distant in a direct line from Mount Everest. It lies on the international border between Nepal and the Tibet Autonomous Region of China and it was first climbed in 1935. A mountain nearby to the west was originally named Lingtrennup ("West Lingtren") but is now more commonly called by its Mandarin Chinese translation Xi Lingchain.

== Geography ==
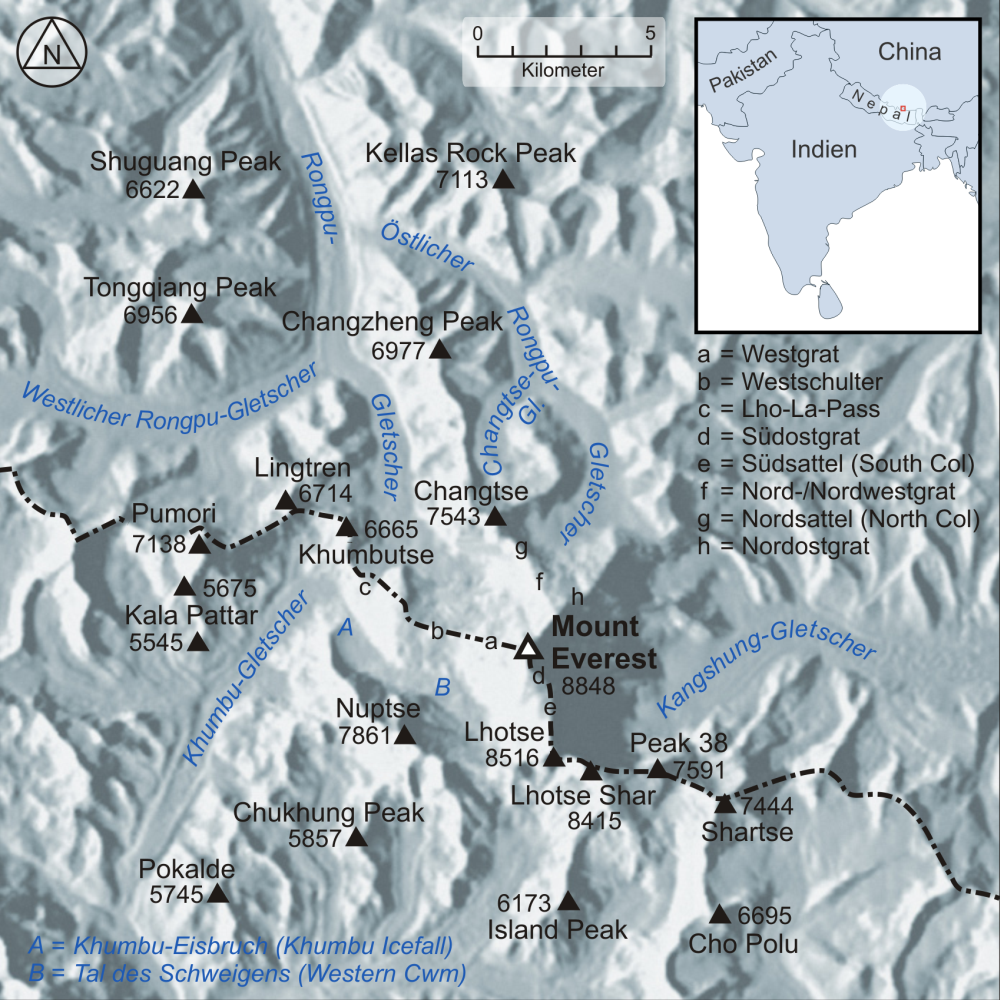
Topographical map of the region

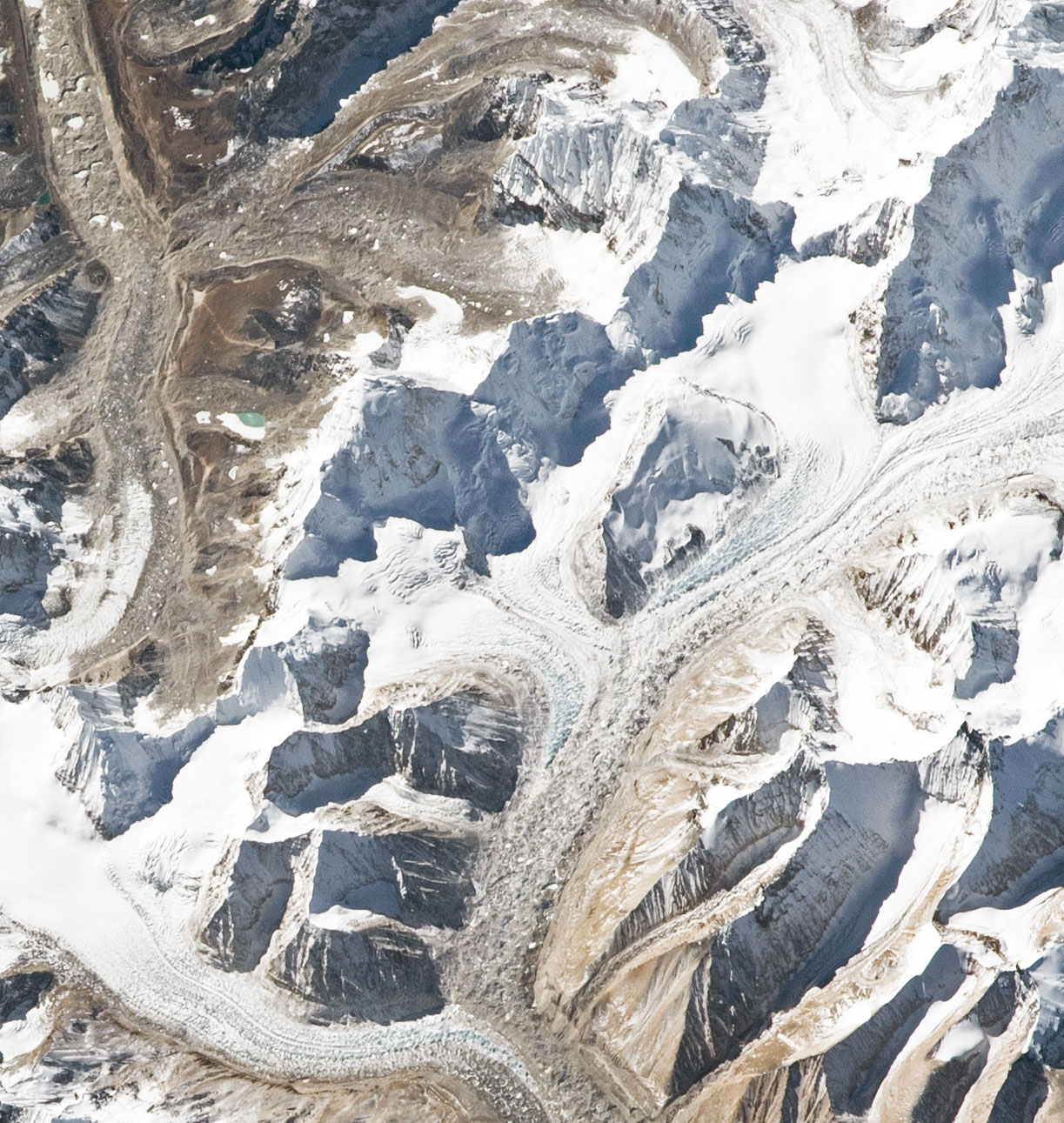
Rongbuk Glacier region from above, with Pumori North side and Xi Lingchain alongside in the centre, Lingtren immediately below Pumori, and Guangming in the centre of the peaks below Lingtren

A long chain of mountains extends generally somewhat north of west from Mount Everest whose west ridge descends to the col of Lho La (6,026 metres (19,770 ft)) before rising to Khumbutse (6,665 metres (21,867 ft)). The ridge drops to an unnamed col at 6,204 metres (20,354 ft) and then ascends to Lingtren from where it continues to another unnamed col at 6,126 metres (20,098 ft) and then to Pumori (7,165 metres (23,507 ft)). Bounded on the north by this chain of mountains is the Khumbu Glacier, which descends to the northwest over the Icefall before it turns sharply southwest. Lingtren lies at the apex of this right-angled bend. North of the mountain chain in Tibet the West Rongbuk Glacier flows east to join the main Rongbuk Glacier. Near Lingtren, the Khumbu glacier is at about 5,400 metres (17,700 ft) whereas the West Rongbuk glacier is at about 6,000 metres (20,000 ft).

Geologically the south face of the mountain is of black gneiss overlain by a thick sill of massive granite. The gneiss has been intruded with many thinner granite sills.

The summit elevation is alternatively stated to be 6,714 metres (22,028 ft) and 6,674 metres (21,896 ft) using different elevation models. Lingtren's prominence is about 593 metres (1,946 ft) above its key col, which is between it and its nearest higher neighbour Pumori.

== Discovery ==
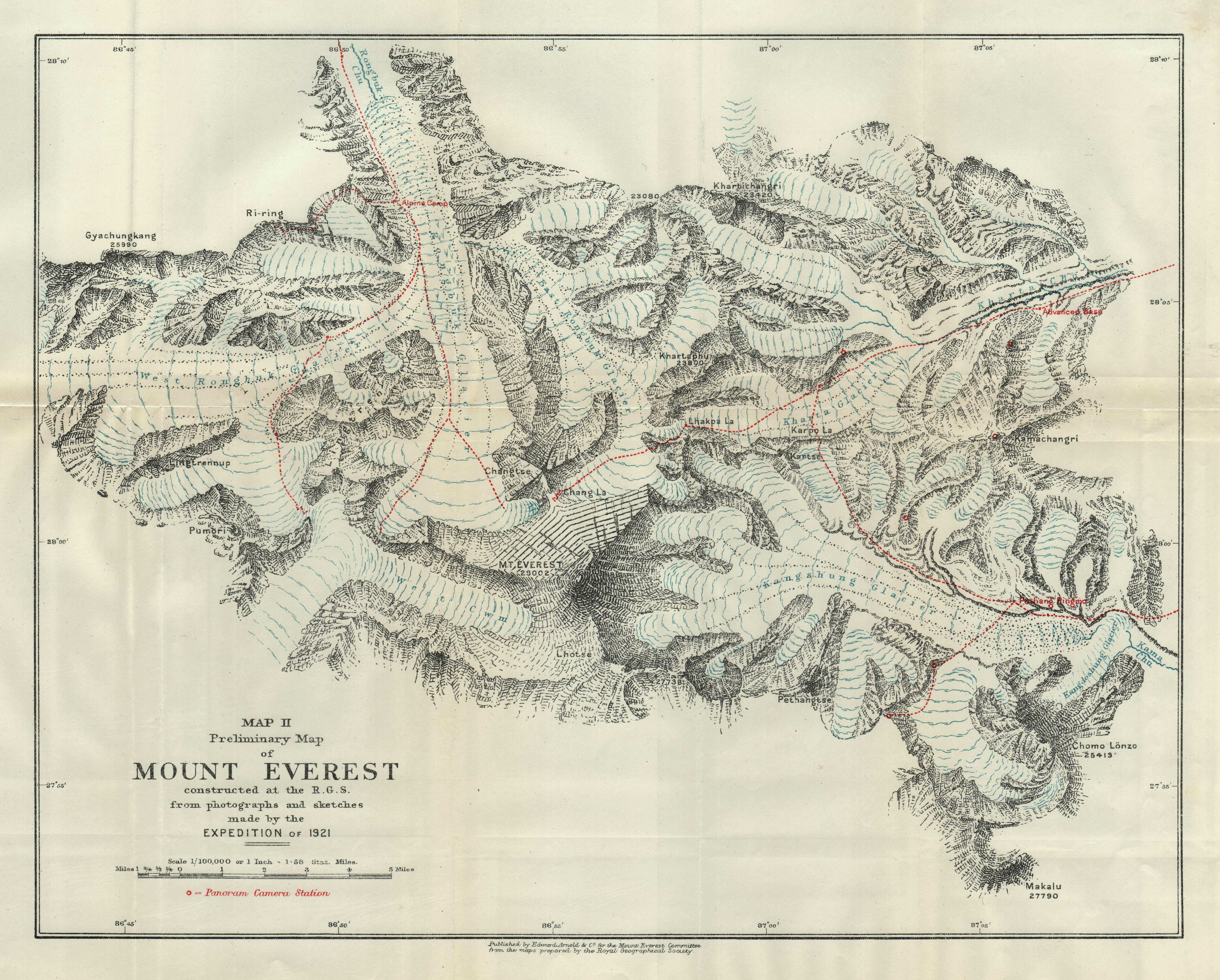
1921 expedition map with the name Lingtren (left of centre) representing a wider group of peaks and ridges

Lingtren can easily be seen from inhabited villages in the Khumbu valley of Nepal but it may be that the first time it was seen by western explorers was from Tibet in 1921. During the 1921 British Mount Everest reconnaissance expedition George Mallory and Guy Bullock were exploring the region to the north of Mount Everest hoping to find a route to the summit. Everest's west ridge did not seem promising so they tried to reach the watershed at some point to see what lay to the south. In doing this they discovered Lingtren (but did not climb it) and skirted its flanks to reach a col from where they were able to see the Western Cwm for the first time. However, the prospect of a precipitous descent to the Khumbu Glacier and then an ascent of the Khumbu Icefall led them to reject this route.

== Naming ==
The peak now known as Lingtren is actually part of a complex formation extending to the north into the West Rongbuk Glacier (see 1921 expedition map). The northern section, at the junction of the west and main Rongbuk glaciers, is now generally called Guangming Peak (28°02′46″N 86°51′53″E) and has an elevation of 6,533 metres (21,434 ft). The name "Lingtren" now only refers to the highest summit, which is immediately to the north of the Khumbu Glacier.

Mallory and Bullock suggested names for the many topographical features they discovered and these were endorsed by the expedition and passed to Charles Bell, Britain's special ambassador to Lhasa, for approval. With reference to the whole Lingtren complex, they chose the name Lingtren as Tibetan for "subcontinent" or "island". By allusion, this word is also used to describe a lesser temple associated with a main temple.

There is another peak jutting into the West Rongbuk glacier but further to the west which proved to be an excellent location for observing and photographing the mountainous topography. This they named "Lingtrennup" (West Lingtren) and Mallory frequently referred to it by the nickname "Island Peak" because of its isolated location. This mountain has an elevation of 6,396 metres (20,984 ft) and it is now generally called Xi Lingchain (28°02′05″N 86°48′28″E).

== First ascent ==
The 1935 British Mount Everest reconnaissance expedition again explored the region and on this occasion, during what Eric Shipton called "a veritable orgy of mountain climbing", Shipton and Leslie Vickery "Dan" Bryant climbed for the first time an outlying peak of Lingtren, Lingtrennup and then the main peak of Lingtren. As they were finally descending along a narrow ridge of ice they broke through a cornice and Bryant fell over 150 metres (500 ft). Shipton was able to hold the rope and Bryant, who had retained his ice axe, was able to climb back.

== Subsequent events ==
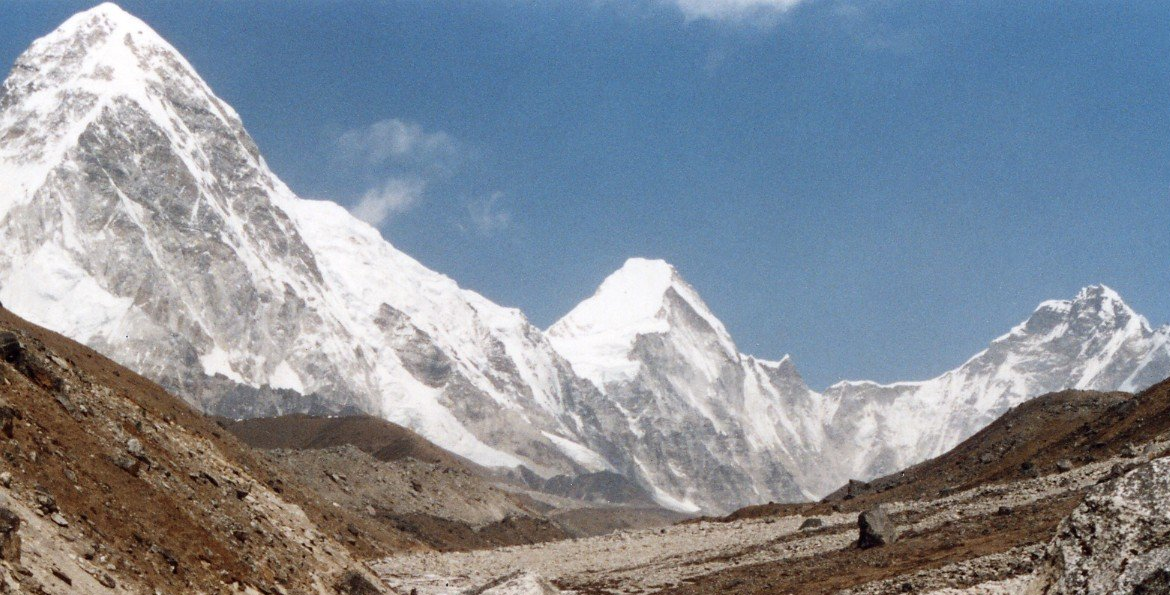
Pumori, Lingtren and Khumbutse panorama

When ascending the Khumbu valley at the start of the successful 1953 Everest expedition, John Hunt said that the glacier appeared as if it could only originate at an apparent valley head between Lingtren and Nuptse – the Icefall and Western Cwm were completely invisible around the sharp bend in the glacier. He described one summit of Lingtren as being "square and steep-ridged" and another to the east (he called it Lingtren Two) as "thin as a wafer at its top, looking incredibly fragile".

There has been no fully accepted record of the mountain having been climbed since 1935 and this would mean it has never been climbed from the Nepalese side. This is perhaps remarkable because from Everest Base Camp, along with Pumori and Khumbutse (which have both been climbed), the mountain is very noticeable being less than 5 kilometres (3 mi) away. A planned South-African expedition on Lingtren was canceled in 2013. In Hoger dan de Dhaulagiri, Bart Vos claimed he had climbed Lingtren in 1993 saying he started in Nepal and then crossed into Tibet. This claim has, however, been discounted.

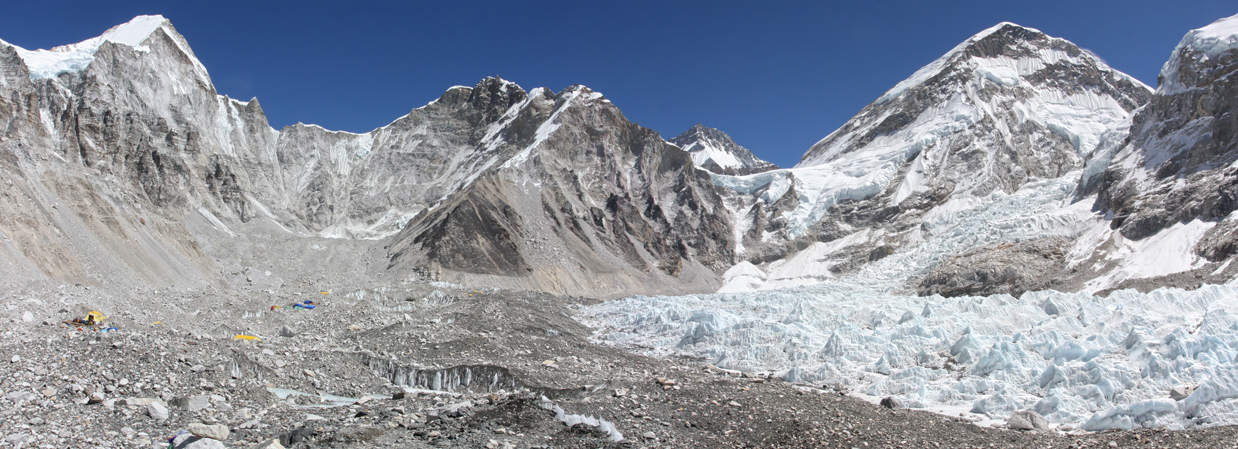
Left to right: Lingtren-Khumbutse - Everest west shoulder.
