= Khumbu La =

Khumbu La may refer to:

- Lho La, west of Mount Everest, which it was once proposed should take on this name
- Nangpa La, northwest of Mount Everest, which used to have (and occasionally is still called by) this name
