= Bryn Hubbard =

Bryn Hubbard is a professor of glaciology at Aberystwyth University and Director of its Centre for Glaciology. His research focuses on field-based glaciology, particularly the internal structure, composition and dynamics of glaciers and ice masses, using borehole measurements, geophysical instruments and modelling to understand how glaciers respond to climate change.

Hubbard has led glaciological fieldwork in polar and high-mountain environments. In 2017, he led drilling on the Khumbu Glacier near Everest as part of the EverDrill project, which investigated glacier structure, flow and climate-change response, including the risk of glacier-dammed lake outburst floods. In 2013 he was awarded the Polar Medal, an award given to British citizens in recognition of acquisition of knowledge about polar regions, and who have undertaken polar expeditions in extreme hardship.
