= Khangri Shar =

Mountain in Nepal and China

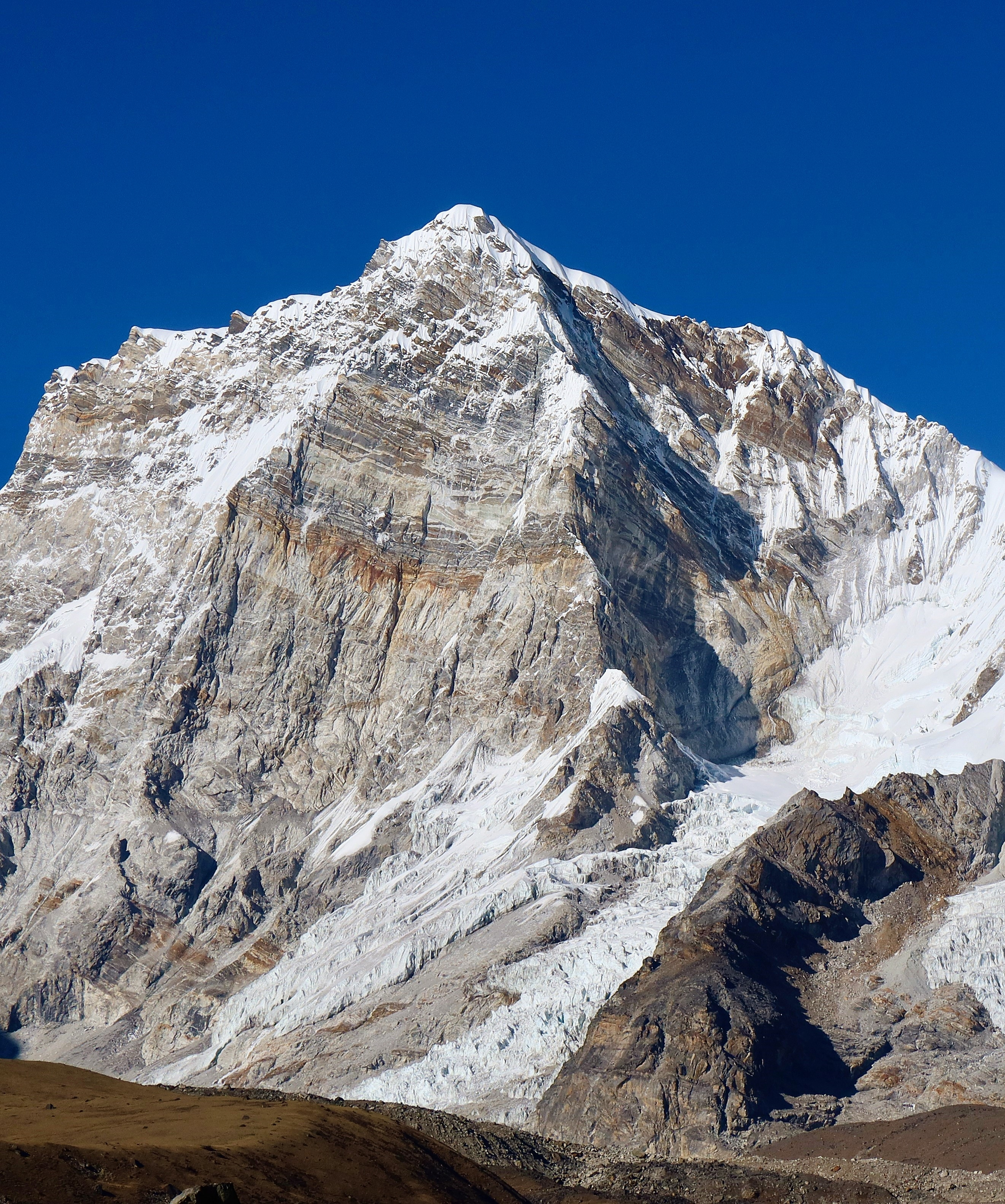
- South aspect

Highest point
- Elevation: 6,811 m (22,346 ft)
- Prominence: 316 m (1,037 ft)
- Parent peak: Pumori
- Isolation: 1.27 km (0.79 mi)
- Coordinates: 28°01′08″N 86°48′55″E

Geography
- Location within Nepal Location within Tibet Location within China
- Interactive map of Khangri Shar
- Location: China–Nepal border
- Countries: Nepal and China
- Province: Koshi
- District: Solukhumbu
- Protected area: Sagarmatha National Park; Qomolangma National Nature Preserve
- Parent range: Himalayas; Mahalangur Himal

Climbing
- First ascent: Unclimbed

Khangri Shar is a mountain in Nepal and China.

== Description ==
Khangri Shar is a 6,811-metre (22,346-foot) summit in the Khumbu region of the Himalayas on the China–Nepal border. It is situated 11 kilometres (6.8 mi) west of Mount Everest and 1.5 kilometres (0.93 mi) west of Pumori on the boundary that Sagarmatha National Park shares with Qomolangma National Nature Preserve. Precipitation runoff from the mountain's slopes drains south to the Dudh Koshi and north to the Rong River in Tibet, both of which are tributaries of the Arun River. Topographic relief is significant as the summit rises over 1,250 metres (4,100 ft) above the Khangri Glacier in less than one kilometre (0.62 mi). The mountain awaits a first ascent, as attempts in 2003 by a Japanese team, 2004 by British, 2018 by Swedish, and South Koreans in 2024 all failed to reach the summit.

== Climate ==
Based on the Köppen climate classification, Khangri Shar is located in a tundra climate zone with cold, snowy winters, and cool summers. Weather systems coming off the Bay of Bengal are forced upwards by the Himalaya mountains (orographic lift), causing heavy precipitation in the form of rainfall and snowfall. Mid-June through early-August is the monsoon season. The months of April, May, September, and October offer the most favorable weather for viewing or climbing this peak.

== Gallery ==
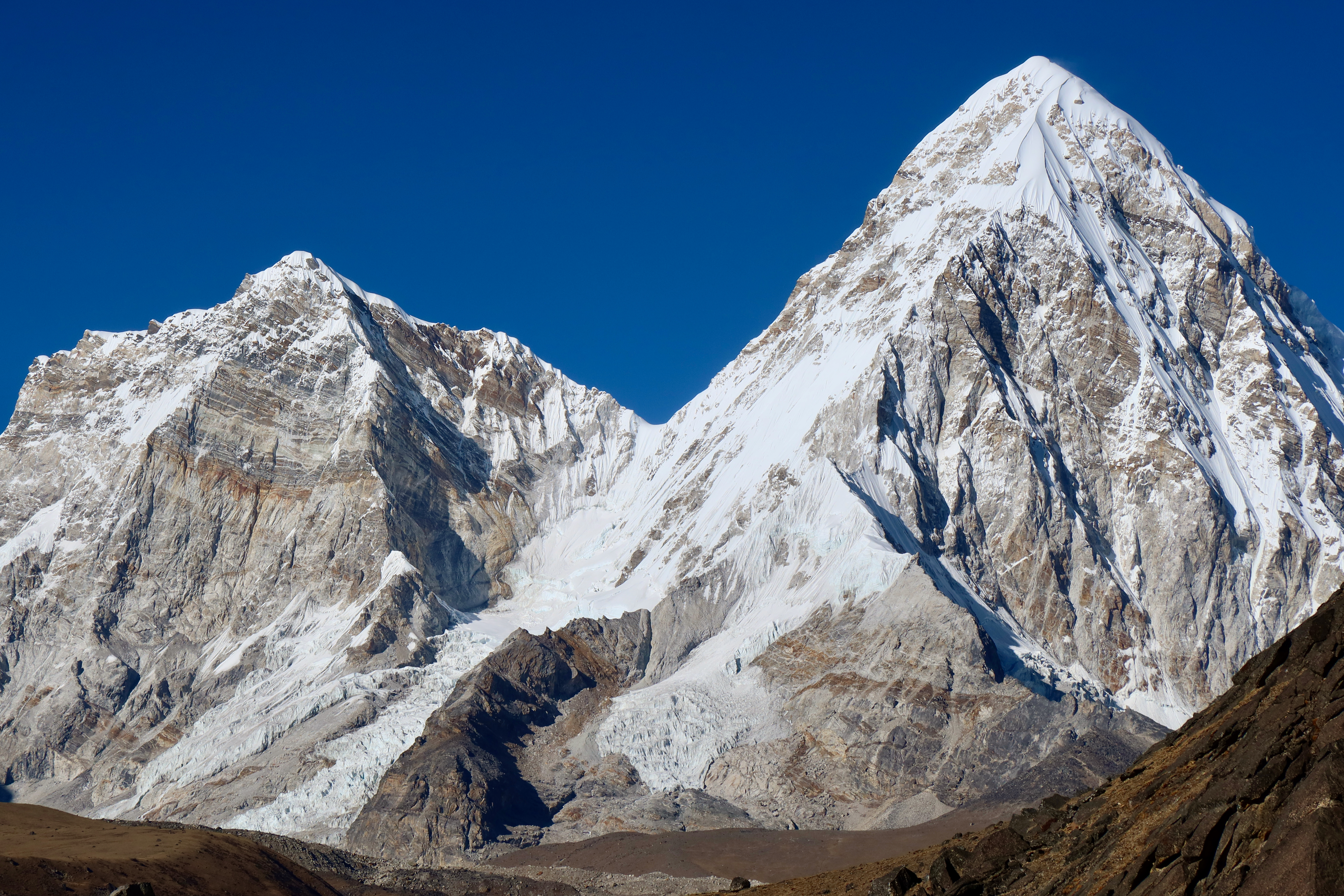
South aspect of Khangri Shar (left) and Pumori (right)

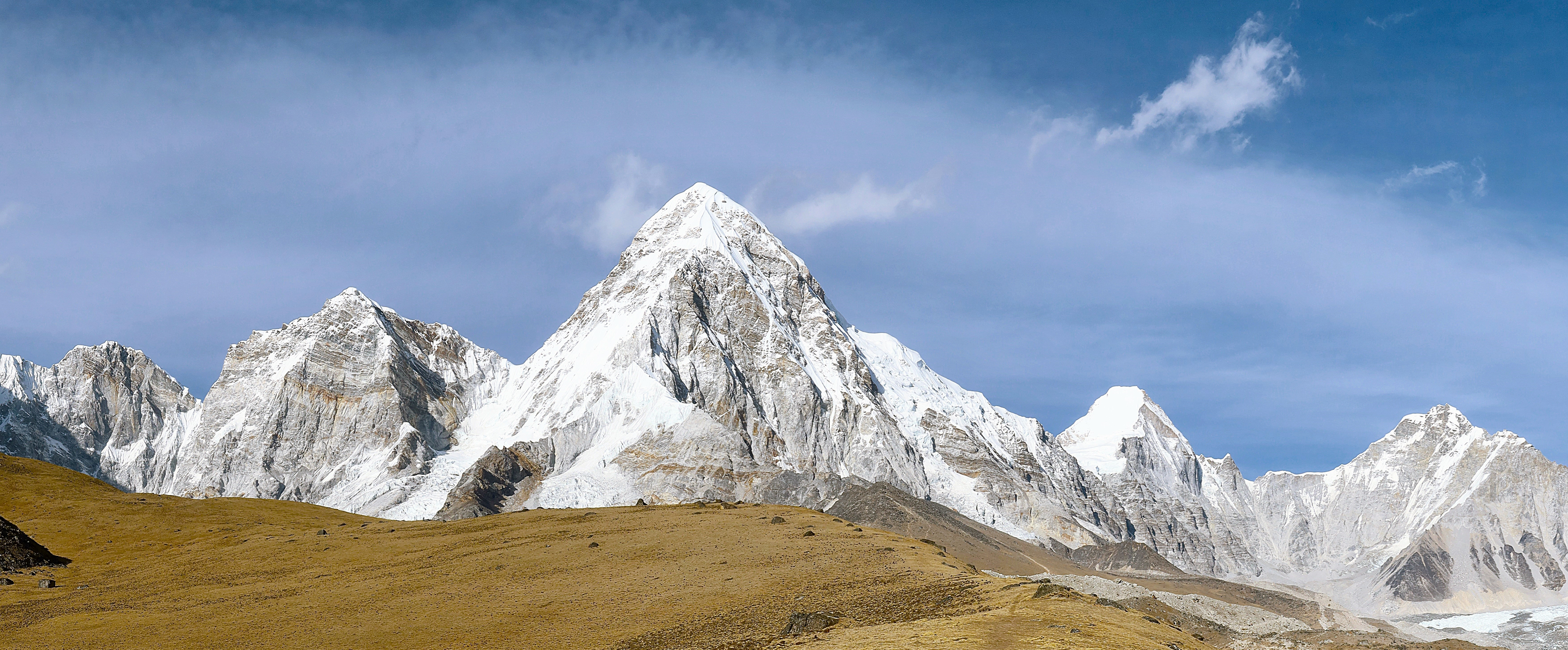
Left to right: Khangri Shar West, Khangri Shar, Pumori, Lingtren, Khumbutse

== See also ==
- Geology of the Himalayas
