= 1979 Yugoslav Mount Everest expedition =

First West Ridge ascent of Mount Everest

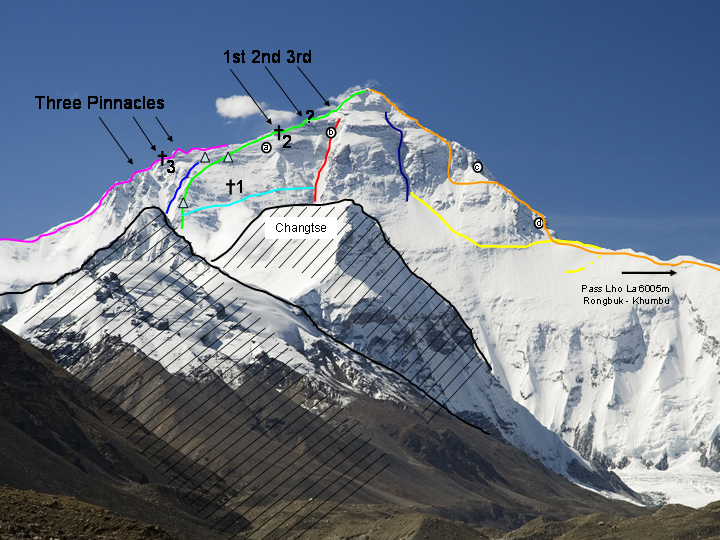
The North Face of Mount Everest. The orange line marks the West Ridge route used by the Yugoslav expedition.

The 1979 Yugoslav Mount Everest expedition (JAHE VII) was the first successful summit of Mount Everest (8,848m) using the entirety of the West Ridge route (the West Ridge Direct) in the North Face of Everest. It was the seventh expedition in the Himalayas by the Yugoslav alpinist team, and their first and only ascent to the highest peak of Mount Everest. The route became known as the "Yugoslavian route" after the first successful ascent. The Yugoslav state leadership declared this ascent the greatest achievement of Yugoslav sports up to that time.

== The West Ridge ==
From the first ascent of Mount Everest in 1953 until the Yugoslav ascent in 1979, seventeen expeditions from eleven countries successfully ascended Mount Everest, for a total of 84 ascents through four directions: over the South Col, the Northeast Ridge, through North Face via Hornbein Couloir, and the Southwest Face. None of the expeditions up to that point made a successful ascent using the West Ridge, which stretches for 6.5 km, from the Lho La pass above the base camp to the summit. The West Ridge is technically demanding and exposed to strong winds from Tibet, and its difficulty is reflected by the fact that of 21 teams that attempted it as of 2000, only three succeeded, only two of which used the West Ridge Direct route.

On a 1963 expedition American mountaineers Tom Hornbein and Willi Unsoeld were forced by the difficult area to partly traverse the previously unexplored West Ridge in 1963, then switch to the Hornbein Couloir to ascend to the peak. A similar path to the Yugoslavian was chosen by the 1974 French expedition, which ended in a disaster when six climbers were killed in an avalanche. The first successful ascent of the West Ridge Direct was done by 24 Yugoslav alpinists, of which four reached the peak on the May 13th and 15th of 1979, using a route modified from the French to avoid the avalanche fall-lines. The West Ridge has maintained its reputation as one of the longest and most difficult routes on Everest, having been successfully ascended only by one more team: the Bulgarian National Everest Expedition, which included summits by Hristo Prodanov on 20 April 1984, Metodi Savov and Ivan Valtchev on 8 May 1984, and Nikolay Petkov and Kiril Doskov on 9 May 1984.

== Preparation ==
Out of 190 alpinists, after three months of thorough checks of each individual's abilities, 40 met the conditions and 24 were selected. The preparations for the climb lasted two full years. Everyone had to learn English, everyone's psychological profile had to be ideal, everyone had to be physically healthy and fix their teeth, as well as create specific equipment that could not be bought. Financing, visas and numerous permits had to be secured at the same time. Five members of the expedition (Škarja, Belak, Marenče, Robas, Zaplotnik) left a year earlier in order to scout, check, agree and set up their base camp at 5,300 meters. At that time, they had discovered a relatively safe approach to the Lho La pass.

The expedition numbered 24 climbers, two doctors, three reporters and 20 local Sherpa guides. The leader of the expedition was an experienced Himalayan climber Tone Škarlja. The leader of the Sherpas was Ang Phu, who climbed Mount Everest the previous year. The six expeditions in the Himalayas from 1960 to 1975 that preceded the Mount Everest had many of these climbers prepared for the highest peak.

- Zvone Andrejčič
- Stane Belak
- Borut Bergant
- Stipe Božić
- Muhamed Gafić
- Viki Grošelj
- Tomaž Jamnik
- Stane Klemenc
- Franček Knez
- Ivč Kotnik
- Marjan Manfreda
- Štefan Marenče
- Vanja Matijevec
- Vladimir Mesarić
- Dušan Podbevšek
- Bojan Pollak
- Roman Robas
- Muhamed Šišić
- Tone Škarja (leader)
- Andrej Štremfelj
- Marko Štremfelj
- Jernej Zaplotnik
- Jože Zupan

The equipment was delivered from Ljubljana by a truck to Rijeka. In the port of Rijeka, 18 tons of equipment were loaded onto the ship: over 10 km of climbing ropes, 350 m of hanging and aluminum ladders, 40 tents, 80 sleeping bags, 30 pairs of specially made "gojzerica" climbing shoes, 500 screws and wedges for rocks and ice, several hundred liters of kerosene and gas for cooking and almost four tons of food. It took two months for the equipment to reach its starting point in the mountains via Calcutta in India and Kathmandu in Nepal. The journey began on February 27, 1979.

The equipment was carried for 19 days by 750 local porters up to 6,000 meters above sea level, where a base camp was set up on the Khumbu Glacier. Each of them carried a load of 30 kg, while the alpinists carried their personal luggage. In the base camp at an altitude of 5,300 meters, tents were set up and equipment was arranged. In one tent there was a barrel containing 60 kg of dollar bills. Porters received $2 per day (equivalent to $9 in 2025).

== Expedition ==
Climbing routes on Mount Everest opened by different expeditions between 1924 and 1996. Yugoslavian route is marked with the blue color on the right side.

The expedition set up five high-altitude camps and placed fixed ropes between them for security. Between March 29 and April 6, the expedition fixed ropes on the slope between the base camp (5,350 m) and the edge of the Lho La (6,050 m) pass, and installed a hand-operated cable transport 200 meters long. About 6 tons of equipment was transported this way. The expedition was met with their first technical problem while climbing the Lho La at around 6,000 meters, when they pitched their tents there but strong wind blew them away. They had to dig up holes in the snow where they lived these days. The UIAA climbing difficulty grade up to the first camp varied between II and III. The second camp was set up at 6,770 meters with 12 beds, and the third camp was pitched up at 7,170 meters, fifty meters below an obstacle, then filled with supplies. This obstacle called the "West Shoulder" was where the 1963 American expedition left the West Ridge for another route. Yugoslav expedition bypassed the obstacle, continued climbing via the West Ridge and set up their fourth camp at 7,520 meters on April 27. They were soon hit by a five-day long storm with winds going over 150 km/h, and they erected their fifth, final camp on May 9, at the height of 8,120 meters.

Supplemental oxygen was to be used only after the fifth camp (Camp V), as the team leader considered that those who could not reach the camp without it were not summit candidates. The teams kept changing, as one climber went ill or too tired to continue, another replaced him. Viki Grošelj and Marjan Manfreda earned the first chance at the summit. After losing some time looking for a way, at around 8,300 meters was a rock chimney so narrow that Manfreda, who led the pitch, couldn't carry a pack with supplemental oxygen bottles because it jammed in the narrow cleft of rock, halting his progress. He took off his gloves after climbing over a tall vertical slab of granite on the top of which he hung a rope, and when he set it up he saw that he had to go back because his hands were frozen. They returned to the base, and for them the ascent was over. His fingers were frostbitten and treated in the camp, but that rope fix helped other teams to progress. The next day, Dušan Podbevšek and Roman Robas won their summit bid, but lost their way in the rock towers, and due to loss of time had to return to the base as well. Forty days into the expedition, the third attempt was done by Jernej "Nejc" Zaplotnik and two brothers, Marko and Andrej Štremfelj. The winds roared down, tossing the climbers on the ground and choking their lungs with snow. Spending several days without rest, combined with powerful winds and the temperature of −35 °C made the trio retreat, first to the Camp IV, then all the way back to base camp to regroup and recover.

The trio was back in the Camp V by May 12, and prepared for another attempt the next day. Andrej Štremfelj was initially ambitious to reach the summit with his brother, but Marko's oxygen system and backup ventilator both failed and he had to go down. Zaplotnik and Andrej kept making rapid progress, when Andrej's backup ventilator also failed, and the situation reached a critical point. Zaplotnik provided his last backup ventilator to Andrej, but that one also started hissing. Zaplotnik gave Andrej his own ventilator and bottles and told him he will climb on behind him without one on himself. Zaplotnik was not willing to consider retreating again, and the only acceptable outcome of that day to him was reaching the summit, willing to even risk his life. In a moment of luck, Zaplotnik managed to retrieve the last broken backup ventilator. The two climbers continued up to the vertical chimney where Manfreda had fixed rope. Zaplotnik connected his ascenders to it and pulled himself up the chimney. He saw two options in the gully ahead, the one where Podbevšek and Robas lost their way, and another one, which Zaplotnik and Andrej chose. After some creeping, they found themselves in the Yellow Band of Mount Everest, which encircles Everest along the height of 8,200 and 8,600 meters. They traversed an extremely small, crumbling ledge with 2,500 meters of space gaping below them, reminding themselves how they safely crossed such dangerous narrow ledges back in the Julian Alps. Climbing some steep sections barehanded, Zaplotnik had his fingers frozen. The Western Cwm suddenly rushed towards him, as his handhold broke off in his hand, and Andrej started holding him on a rope until he recovered. A bit higher up, Zaplotnik's foothold also broke and he slid back to Andrej. Going ahead, they were starting to get worried about getting down, but they could think about that when they reached the summit. And soon, they saw a tripod looming through the fog, the one set by the Chinese team in 1975. Embracing to the top, they finally reached the summit where this tripod was and became the first Yugoslav alpinists to reach the peak of Mount Everest.

Meanwhile, another trio consisted of Stipe Božić (who had been filming the entire climb), Stane Belak, and the Sherpa guide Ang Phu, for whom this was the second climb which would make him the first person to do so from two different routes, a job he also loved doing. They waited out one day of bad weather in Camp IV, then set on to follow Zaplotnik's and Andrej's route. They took a slightly different route later on, traversing less-steep rock steps into the Hornbein Couloir and up the 'American Step'. This was where Ang Phu wanted to stop, saying that his rock-climbing skills weren't good enough. Božić helped him through difficult bits, and all three were soon on the top, took pictures, hoisted the flag and did radio-calling. Four Yugoslavs reached the top of the Mount Everest in total - three Slovenes and one Croat.

== Descent ==
Zaplotnik and Andrej discussed their options for descending, and one of the options they discarded was going down the south side, the South Col route known for its deadliness. The best option seemed to be to descend the Hornbein Couloir, after which they would go over easier terrain towards the Camp IV where their teammates waited. The route ahead was steep, exposed and difficult. They put on their oxygen masks and agreed to use as little rope as possible to avoid a bivouac. They reached a vertical chimney in the Yellow Band. Zaplotnik exited it across a boulder, but Andrej's pack frame got caught in the chimney and he tumbled, fell over, and accelerated wildly down the hill flipping. Andrej managed to save himself after falling 50 to 60 meters, slamming his axe in the slope the hardest he could. As the two exhausted climbers approached Camp IV, night had already fell, their headlamps flickered, the temperature dropped and they lost their way. They were eventually found by their teammates near the camp and could go to rest.

Two days later, after Božić, Belak and Phu reached the summit, and had to plan for their descent as well. A snowstorm had crept in during their 12-hour climb, and down-climbing the 'American Step' was going to be difficult. Božić was pinned down in an exposed position by strong gusts of wind and stuck for half an hour. They ran out of oxygen and an intense cold took away their body heat. Belak tried to radio-call the base camp, but could not reach anybody. On descent, the weather worsened quickly and the team were unable to return to Camp IV before dark and were forced to spend the night in a −40 °C temperature, without tents or sleeping bags, at an altitude of 8,400 meters. According to Božić, at the time this was the highest ever overnight bivouac in the open, and the closest he had ever been to death. They managed to survive the night, but on the following day, Ang Phu slipped and fell to his death going through the Hornbein Couloir. He tried to save himself using an ice axe, but it slipped out of his hand during the 2000 meters long fall. The death of a friend hit the members of the expedition hard, so they stopped all activities in the mountain and left the base camp on May 21. The members of the expedition returned to Yugoslavia on May 26, 1979.

== Legacy ==
The expedition's return to Yugoslavia was triumphant. Zagreb's biggest mountaineering gathering of all time was held on the 9 October 1979 — about 3,500 people came to the Lisinski Hall to hear and see the Yugoslavian Himalayans who conquered Mount Everest. About a thousand people remained in front of the doors of the packed hall. Since then, the holding of lectures on expeditions in Lisinski has become a tradition, and about fifteen have been held to date. Stipe Božić became the first Croat to have climbed the Mount Everest, and the decision to film his expeditions largely determined his career as a director of numerous documentaries and shows on Croatian Radio Television. After this success, the state was no longer interested in financing mountaineering expeditions. The subsequent expeditions had a republican and regional character.

The expedition was commemorated on its 40th anniversary at the Mounteneering Festival in Ljubljana, Slovenia. The four climbers who reached the peak and many other members of the expedition gathered together on March 14, 2019, in Karlovac, Croatia, where they recounted their memories of the historic climb.
