= Lho La =

Mountain pass near Mount Everest

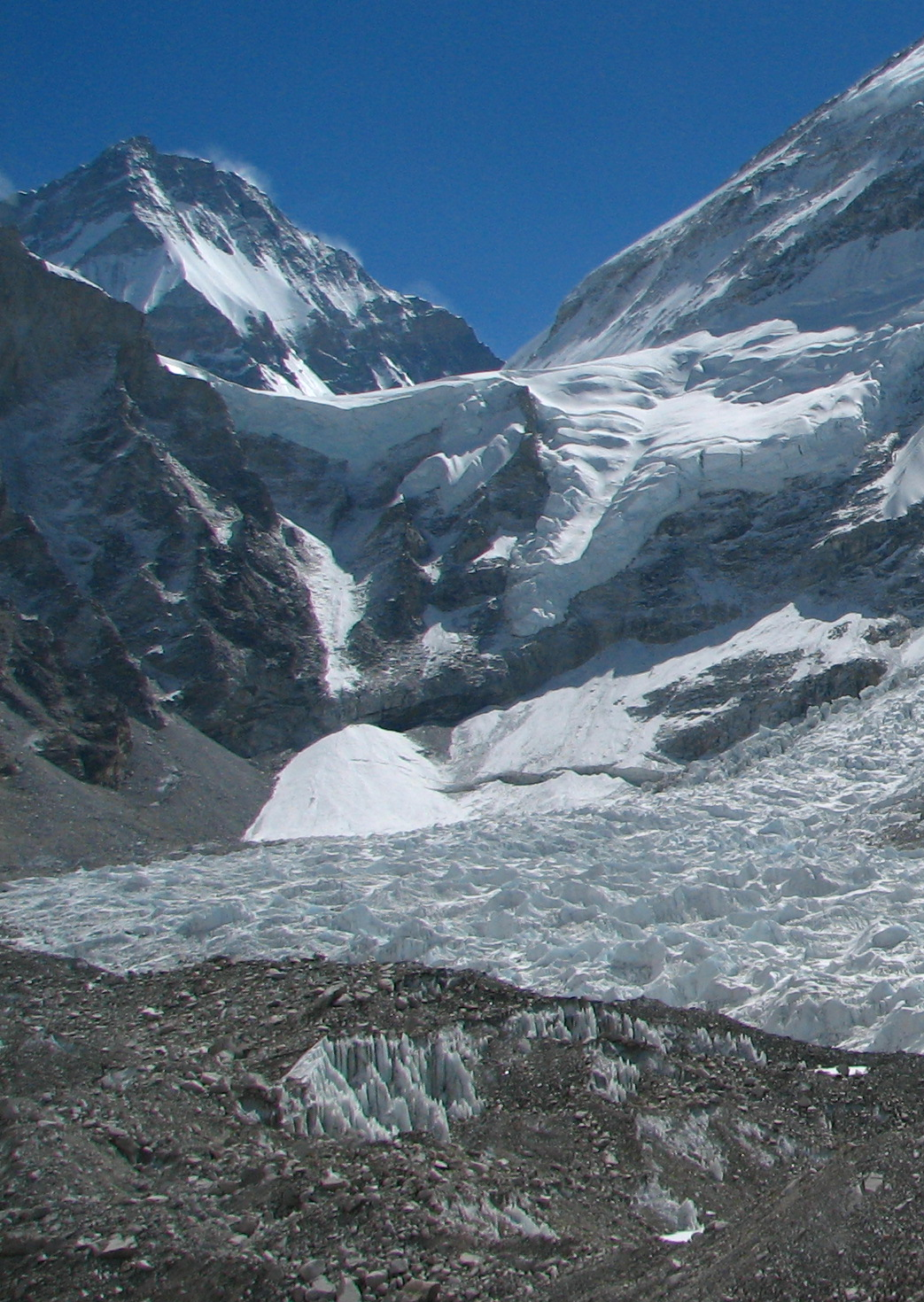
- Viewing from the west, Lho La joins Khumbutse (left) and Everest's West Shoulder (right), with the Khumbu Icefall in the foreground and Changtse behind.

- Location within Nepal Location within Tibet
- Elevation: 6,006 m (19,705 ft)

Third Approach
- Location: Nepal (Khumjung) – China (Tibet)
- Range: Himalaya
- Coordinates: 28°00′36″N 86°52′34″E

Lho La
- Traditional Chinese: 洛拉山坳
- Simplified Chinese: 洛拉山坳
Transcriptions
Standard Mandarin
- Hanyu Pinyin: Luo4la1 shan1ao4

The Lho La (Chinese: 洛拉山坳) is a col on the border between Nepal and Tibet north of the Western Cwm, near Mount Everest. Situated low on the West Ridge of the mountain at a height of 6,006 metres (19,705 ft), it is not exactly a pass but more of a saddle on the Mt. Everest massif.

== History and name ==
Local accounts suggest that before Khumbu was opened to Western mountaineers, the col served as a practical crossing point over the lowest section of Everest’s West Ridge. These describe trade routes between Nepal and Tibet linking Namche Bazaar and Tingri as well as routes used by local monks. Such claims rely on a period when Everest’s glaciers stood much higher than they do today, meaning that traversing the icefall and the col may have required less steep, technical climbing than in the present era.

For example Trulshik Rinpoche claimed Lho La was part of a trade route around 1800, but as the glaciers subsequently declined, the favoured route became the Nangpa La, to the west. However mountaineers expressed scepticism that a viable route existed that recently.

Klavs Becker-Larsen was told by local sherpas at the onset of his 1951 expedition that a monk had ascended Lho La to return to Rongbuk monastery and hence the route was viable, however Becker-Larsen had to abandon his subsequent attempt to climb Lho La half way due to the dangers of the route. The account of the monk may have been based on a historic traverse when the climb was more feasible.

Ang Tshering Sherpa , born in 1953, said "When I was a child ... We also used to cross Lho La pass (6026m), situated on the western ridge of Mt Everest, on our way to trade in Tibet".

Ang Jangbu Sherpa, referring to monasteries founded in the early 20th century, said "[...] my grandfather used to tell me stories of how in the old days, monks from the Tengboche Monastery used to commute to the Rongbuk monastery in Tibet over the Lho La pass [...] What was once a standard route for the villagers has become a menacing trail that cannot take without proper climbing gear."

In contrast to claimed traverses, the 1921 Everest expedition account mentions the Nangpa La route as a path for trade between Tibet and Nepal, however Lho La was described as a "hopeless precipice".

Following the 1952 Swiss Mount Everest expedition it was suggested that "Lho La" (South Pass) was an unsatisfactory name because it lies to the west of Everest and it would better be renamed "Khumbu La" because it led up from the Khumbu Glacier. This would allow the South Col to be called "Lho La" as it is the col south of Everest and between it and Lhotse. However the Nangpa La had also been called the Khumbu La in the past by local travellers and was still sometimes called by that name. British sentiment was against the proposed name changes and the new names never stuck.

== Approach from Tibet ==
Sketch map of Everest region, showing Lho La 5 km west of the summit

The first western explorers to discover the col were George Mallory and Guy Bullock on the 1921 British Mount Everest reconnaissance expedition although it was only Bullock who actually reached it. They were exploring the Rongbuk Glacier in Tibet hoping it might give access to a route for reaching the summit of Everest. They named it "Lho La", meaning "South Pass" simply because it was to the south of where they were. Lho La gave access to Everest's West Ridge and to its Western Cwm but they thought neither of these gave feasible ways of ascent.

Lho La was also investigated by Bill Tilman and Edmund Wigram on the 1935 British Mount Everest reconnaissance expedition but, like the 1921 explorers, they also preferred the North Col route for a summit attempt.

== Approach from Nepal ==
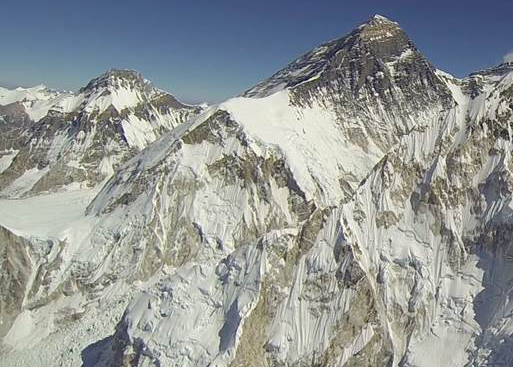
Everest, Southwest Face. Khumbu Glacier's Icefall is bottom left with Lho La above and the snowfield of the Rongbuk Glacier (middle left) behind the col. The West Ridge slopes diagonally from Lho La over the West Shoulder to the summit.

By 1951 China's occupation of Tibet and the opening of Nepal to foreigners meant that Everest was only accessible from the south. A Dane, Klavs Becker-Larsen travelled to Khumbu with the intention of entering Tibet secretly and attempting the North Col route. His attempts to cross the frontier by climbing the Lho La were unsuccessful and he had to retreat.

A British reconnaissance in 1951 assessed the route through the Khumbu Icefall to the Western Cwm, hence by-passing Lho La, and in subsequent years this was the line that was followed, so leading to the South Col and the Southeast Ridge.

The first documented climb to Lho La from Nepal was by Austrian Ernst Senn and sherpa Pemba Sundar as part of the 1955 American Lhotse expedition on 22nd May.

A second successful climb to the Lho La was achieved by Narendra Kumar and Lobsang Sherpa during the 1965 Indian Everest Expedition as part of a reconnaissance of the Pumori/Khumbutse area.

The first attempt to summit Everest via the Lho La/West Ridge route was by the 1974 French Mount Everest expedition, which failed following the death of 6 climbers on the West Ridge in a camp at 6600 metres.

The first successful sumitting of Everest via Lho La was in 1979 when a Yugoslavian team ascended the entirety of the West Ridge after climbing to Lho La. Led by Tone Skarja, a team of 40 put fixed ropes up from 5,350 metres (17,550 ft) on the Khumbu Glacier and used a hand winch for 200 metres to lift 6 tons of equipment. They assessed the climbing grade as between II and III, and on the upper 150 metres (490 ft) as between IV and V, claiming this to be the highest grade V climb in the world.

In 1989 five out of six climbers in a Polish team, attempting a descent that involved climbing Khumbutse from the West Rongbuk Glacier via Lho La, were swept to their deaths on the Lho La itself as they climbed above the col, with one survivor Andrzej Marciniak.
