= Stipe Božić =

Croatian mountaineer

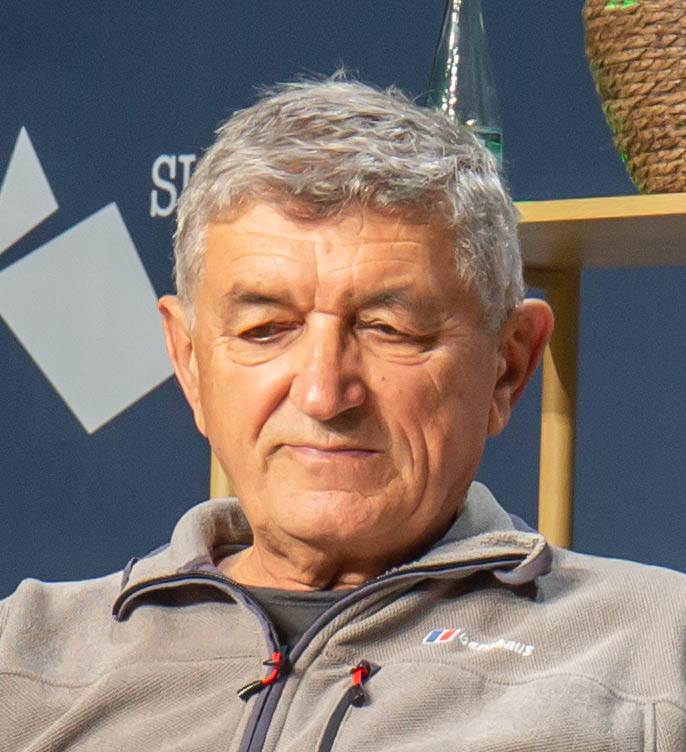
- Born: 2 January 1951; Zavojane near Vrgorac, PR Croatia, FPR Yugoslavia (today's Croatia)
- Occupations: Mountaineer, documentary filmmaker, photographer and writer
- Known for: Completed the Seven Summits

Stipe Božić (born 2 January 1951) is a Croatian mountaineer, documentary filmmaker and photographer. He is the most successful Croatian Himalayan climber. Božić completed the Seven Summits and is the second European, after Reinhold Messner, to climb the highest peak in the world, Mount Everest, twice. He has directed more than 60 documentary films, mostly related to mountains and climbing.

== Early life ==
Božić was born in the village of Zavojane near Vrgorac (at the time SR Croatia, FPR Yugoslavia). When he finished elementary school, he moved with his parents and sister to Split, where his father, a winegrower, found a job as a driver. In Split, Božić enrolled in a high school, joined the scouts, and started with mountain climbing. His parents, who were rather strict, did not approve, and did not accept his hobby until much later, after reading about their son's achievements in the newspapers. After finishing high school, Božić worked as an electrician on an ocean liner, but quit his job as soon as he saved enough money to buy climbing gear.

== Mountaineering career ==
Božić's first notable Himalayan climb was the 1979 ascent to Mount Everest as part of the Yugoslav expedition that used a previously unclimbed West Ridge route, known today as the Complete West Ridge. A similar path was chosen by a 1974 French expedition that ended in disaster when six climbers were killed in an avalanche, but Yugoslav team leader Tone Škarja modified the route so as to avoid the avalanche fall-lines. The large expedition, numbering 25 climbers, arrived at Base Camp on 31 March and progressed smoothly through four additional bases. Andrej Štremfelj and Nejc Zaplotnik reached the summit on 13 May, followed two days later by Stane Belak, Ang Phu and Božić (becoming the 85th through 89th persons to have climbed Mount Everest). On descent, the weather worsened quickly and the team were unable to return to Base Four before dark and were forced to spend the night in a −40 °C (−40 °F) temperature, without tents or sleeping bags, at an altitude of 8,400 metres (27,600 ft). According to Božić, at the time this was the highest ever overnight bivouac in the open, and the closest he had ever been to death. They managed to survive the night, but on the following day, Ang Phu slipped and fell to his death going through the Hornbein Couloir.

The difficulty of the Everest West Ridge route is reflected by the fact that, as of 2000, 21 teams attempted it, but only 3 succeeded. This 1979 climb is considered by many as one of the finest in the history of Everest.

=== 1980s ===
Božić second Himalayan ascent was Lhotse in 1981, with a Slovenian team via a new South face route. Although he failed to get to the summit, reaching 8,150 metres (26,740 ft) in a solo climb on the south rock wall, Božić considered his Lhotse effort technically the most demanding and possibly his greatest Himalayan success. The following year, Božić summited Kang Guru with two Croatian climbers.

The 1983 expedition to Manaslu ended in disaster when Nejc Zaplotnik and Ante Bućan were killed in an ice avalanche. Božić returned to the same mountain a year later in a successful climb with Slovenian climber Viki Grošelj. In 1985 Božić was climbing in the Alps: Eiger via the classic north face route, and Grandes Jorasses via the Cassin route.

Božić returned to Mount Everest in 1989, with the Macedonian Alpine Himalayan Expedition Everest '89. An easier route was used, but the ascent was difficult for Božić because, having caught a bad cold, he suffered from hallucinations, and did not have a full recollection of the events afterwards. Macedonian member of the team Dimitar Ilievski died on the mountain. Macedonian mountaineer Borče Jovčevski remained at Camp IV to provide logistical support for the summit team. Božić's successful ascent on 10 May made him only the second European, after Reinhold Messner, to climb Mount Everest twice. As of 2021, Božić remains the only Croat with two Mount Everest ascents.

=== 1990s ===
After a successful climb to Kanchenjunga (1991) and an unsuccessful one to Annapurna (1992), Božić climbed K2 in 1993. The expedition's progress was smooth until shortly before the top of the climb, when the weather worsened. Božić, Viki Grošelj, Carlos Carsolio and Zvonko Požgaj were only able to touch the summit, because standing on it would have been impossible due to high winds. On the way back, the team got lost in the snowstorm, but ultimately managed to get to base four, where they found Boris Sedej and Boštjan Kekec. The latter was in distress, showing symptoms of hypoxia, his condition worsening. Due to the urgency of the situation, Sedej, Požgaj and Božić descended with Kekec through the snowstorm. Soon Kekec was unable to walk and became unresponsive, and the trio pulled him through the deep snow. When this became physically too difficult and when Požgaj began to suffer from frostbite, they decided to leave Kekec to die on the mountain. Božić was affected by snow blindness and barely made it to safety, using only the climbing rope to direct himself back to the base camp.

=== 2000s ===
Stipe Božić completed the Seven Summits in 2000. The sequence of his climbs was: Mont Blanc (1974), Mount Everest (1979 and 1989), Aconcagua, Mount McKinley, Mount Kosciuszko and Kilimanjaro (all 1996), Mount Vinson (1997), and Elbrus (2000).

In 2003 Božić expressed his desire to climb Mount Tyree, the second highest mountain of Antarctica. This would have made him the first person in the world to climb two highest peaks on each of the seven continents, i.e. to complete both Seven Summits and Seven Second Summits.

== Filmmaking career and other activities ==
Sedam vrhova (Seven Summits) is Stipe Božić's 250-page autobiography, published in 2003.

Božić has been photographing and filming his climbing experiences since his ascent to Noshaq in 1975, made into a television documentary Hindukush '75 for RTV Sarajevo. He carried a camera to Mount Everest in 1979, when he refused to jettison it even in the most difficult circumstances. Božić went on to carry a camera on nearly all of his Himalayan expeditions. He has directed more than 60 documentary films, among them a documentary series Sedam vrhova (Seven Summits), which is also the name of his autobiography published in 2003.

For a while, Božić worked as a journalist, and wrote articles for Slobodna Dalmacija, Večernji list, and National Geographic.

During the Croatian War of Independence Božić used to assist the Croatian Army in mountainous regions of Croatia that were war zones. In February 1992 he was wounded by shrapnel.

Besides mountaineering Božić has been also involved in speleology and desert exploration. In 1994 he descended into Lukina jama, the 1,392-meter (4,567 ft) deep pit which is a part of the Velebit cave complex. His 11-part documentary series Pustinje svijeta (Deserts of the World), premiered in early 2010, was produced by the Croatian Radiotelevision.

For more than 30 years Božić has been volunteering for the Croatian Mountain Rescue Service, and is currently the head of its Split branch. He took part in hundreds of search and rescue operations, most notably in the helicopter evacuation of thirteen dead and injured firefighters from Kornat island in August 2007.

== Personal life ==
Stipe Božić is married to Vera, a civil construction engineer. The two met in Bormio, Italy in 1980, where Stipe, who is a certified ski instructor, gave ski lessons. Together they have two daughters, Maja (born c. 1987) and Iva (born c. 1989). His wife climbed Kilimanjaro with him in 1996.

Stipe had a son, Joško (born 1975), from his first marriage. Joško was, like his father, a mountain climber and a rescuer for the Croatian Mountain Rescue Service. He was killed with his wife Ana in a motorcycle accident in June 2007.
