= Edmund Wigram =

British doctor and mountaineer

- Born: 4 July 1911; India
- Died: 2 December 1945 (aged 34); Bangor, Wales
- Education: Trinity College, Cambridge
- Known for: 1935 British Mount Everest reconnaissance expedition and 1936 British Mount Everest expedition

Edmund Hugh Lewis Wigram (4 July 1911 – 2 December 1945) was a British obstetrician and a mountaineer who was a member of two of the early British Everest expeditions.

== Early life ==
Wigram was born in India in 1911. His maternal grandfather was Sir Thomas Charles Dewey Bt. He attended Marlborough College.

Numerous members of Wigram's family were climbers so, having started climbing in Great Britain and the Alps as a schoolboy, he was already an experienced mountaineer when he went to study at Trinity College, Cambridge. At Cambridge he studied medicine and became the President of the University Mountaineering Club for 1931–32, he was elected to the Alpine Club in 1933.

== Everest expeditions ==
Wigram took part in both the 1935 British Mount Everest reconnaissance expedition and the 1936 British Mount Everest expedition and was described as "strong as an ox and a good alpinist". (Note: , p.195) Neither of these expedition made any significant progress towards the ascent of Everest - "no one got anywhere near the high point of 1933".

He was the youngest member of the 1935 expedition. On that expedition he and Bill Tilman climbed to the Lho La to investigate the possibility of either ascending Everest by the west ridge or of descending south from there onto the Nepalese side of the mountain. They came away convinced that an attempt on the summit of Everest by that ridge was "utterly impracticable in its lower section" (the 1963 American Mount Everest expedition gained the ridge from the Western Cwm at the west shoulder, (Note: , p.373) about 4,000ft above the Lho La, it was not until 1979 that the Yugoslav Mount Everest expedition managed to ascend the entire west ridge of Everest from the Lho Lo) (Note: , p.461) and that the approach from the Lho La "held no prospect of a descent into Nepal" (Note: , p.200) because there was a "mighty precipice". Looking back on the expedition Tilman commented that "E.H.L. Wigram and I had degenerated into mere peak baggers, collecting seventeen all over 20,000feet", amongst those peaks was the 7,213 metres (23,665 ft) Khartaphu. Wigram and Tilman also got to within 460 metres (1,510 ft) of the summit of North Peak of Changtse, a 7,543 metres (24,747 ft) peak immediately north of Everest, before they were turned back by very deep and soft snow. In 1936 the weather conditions were worse than experienced on any previous Everest expedition, several members of the party, including Wigram, reached the North Col at 7,020 metres (23,030 ft) but heavy snowfall, due to the early arrival of the monsoon, made further progress unjustifiable. (Note: , p.203-207)

== Medical work and war service ==
Wigram was appointed as an obstetrician at St. Thomas' Hospital where, he met Kathleen (Kit) Hallam, a sister whom he married in 1938. After St. Thomas' he went on to the Radcliffe Infirmary, Oxford, in 1938, a job to which he returned after demobilisation at the end of 1945, shortly before his death.

Wigram served as a medical officer in the Royal Army Medical Corps during the Second World War and attained the rank of major. Over the winter of 1943-44, he was posted with the Lovat Scouts to Jasper National Park in the Canadian Rockies as medical officer and mountaineering instructor.

== Death ==
Wigram survived the war although his elder brother, Aidan Frederick who was also an active climber, died in service leaving a wife and two children. Less than two months after the war's end Wigram was also dead, also leaving a wife and two children.

On 1 December 1945 he was climbing the route 'Faith', with his wife, on the Idwal Slabs (Rhiwiau Caws), Wales. For an unknown reason he fell from about three pitches up the climb on "what was, to him, easy ground". Although the rope caught round a projecting rock and held him, he had incurred internal injuries after a fall of sixty or seventy feet and he died next day in the hospital at Bangor. He is buried at Capel Curig in the graveyard of St Julitta's Church.

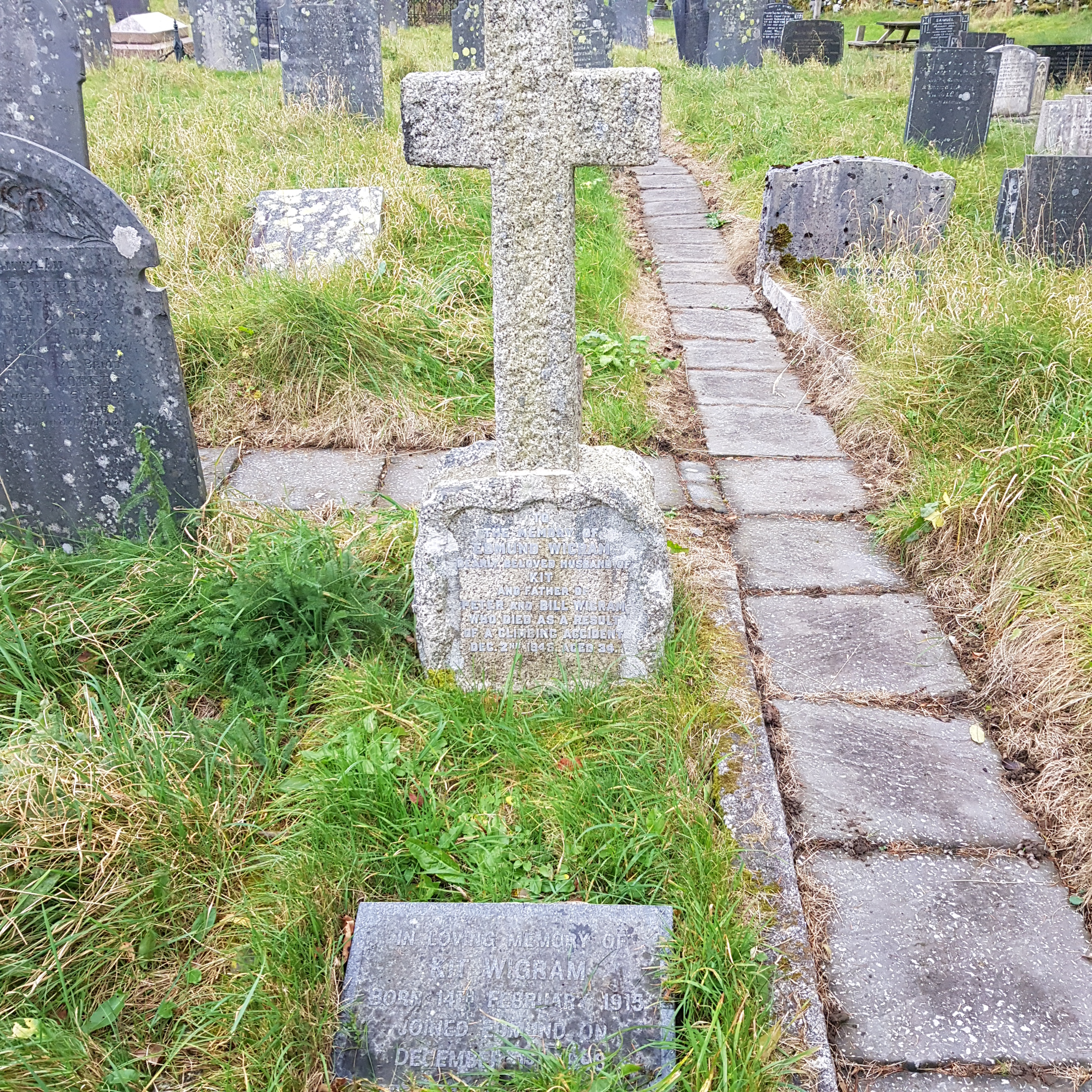
Tombstone of Edmund Wigram (1911-1945), St Julitta's church, Capel Curig.
