= Pumori =

Himalayan mountain in Nepal and China

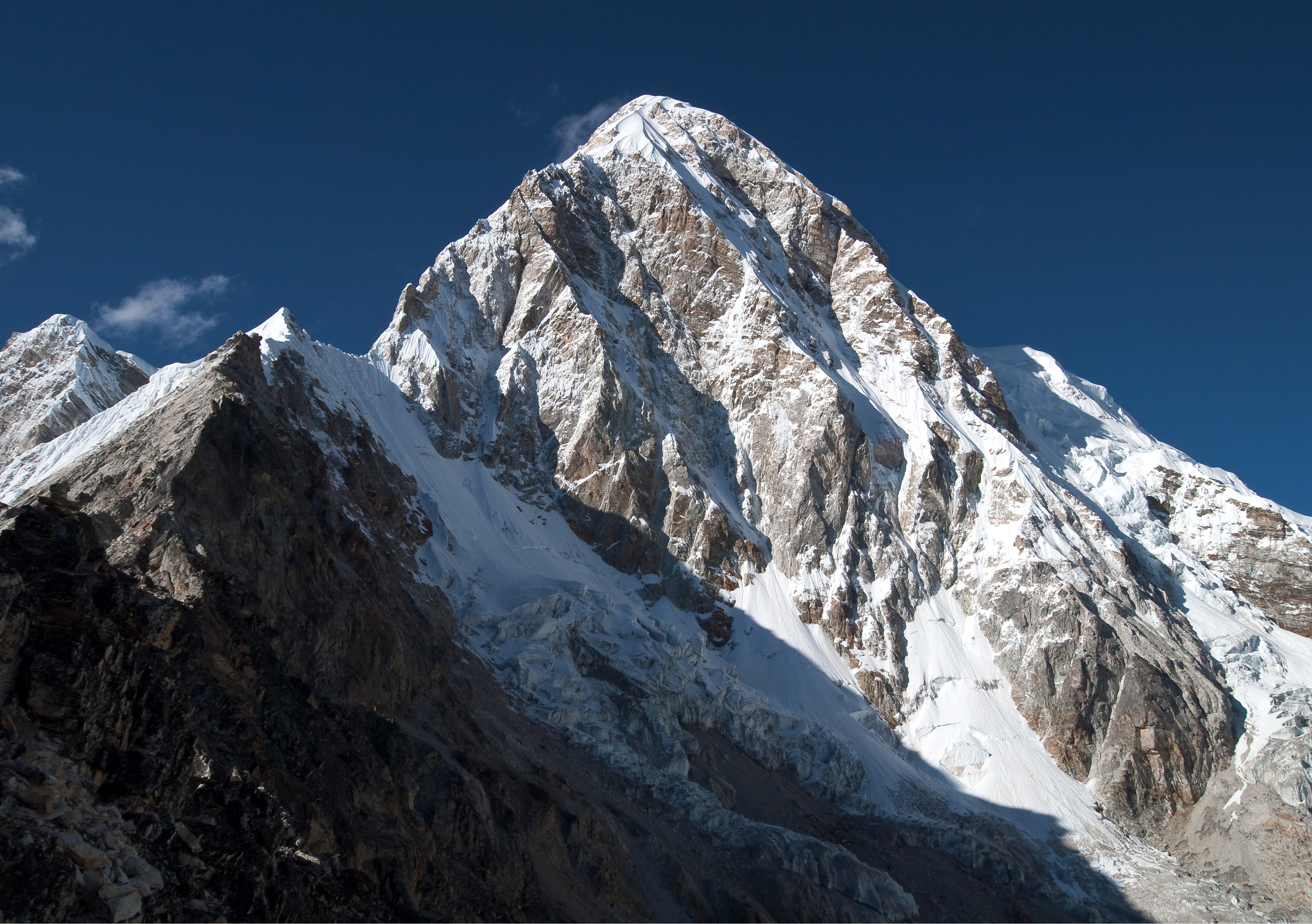
- View of Pumori from Kala Patthar, Khumbu Valley

Highest point
- Elevation: 7,165 m (23,507 ft)
- Prominence: 1,278 m (4,193 ft)
- Coordinates: 28°00′56″N 86°49′41″E

Geography
- Location: Solukhumbu District, Koshi Province, Nepal
- Parent range: Mahalangur Himal, Himalayas

Climbing
- First ascent: 1962 by Gerhard Lenser
- Easiest route: snow/ice climb

Pumori
- Traditional Chinese: 普莫里峰
- Simplified Chinese: 普莫里峰

Pumori (Nepali: पुमोरी, Chinese: 普莫里峰) (or Pumo Ri) is a mountain on the Nepal–China border in the Mahalangur section of the Himalayas. Pumori lies just eight kilometres west of Mount Everest. Pumori, meaning "the Mountain Daughter" in Sherpa language, was named by George Mallory. "Pumo" means young girl or daughter and "Ri" means mountain in Sherpa language. Climbers sometimes refer to Pumori as "Everest's Daughter". Mallory also called it Clare Peak, after his daughter.

Pumori is a popular climbing peak. The easiest route is graded class 3, although with significant avalanche danger. Pumori was first climbed on May 17, 1962, by Gerhard Lenser on a German-Swiss expedition. Two Czechs (Leopold Sulovský and Zdeněk Michalec) climbed a new route on the south face in the spring of 1996.

An outlier of Pumori is Kala Patthar (5,643 metres; 18,514 ft), which appears as a brown bump below the south face of Pumori. Many trekkers going to see Mount Everest up close will attempt to climb to the top of Kala Patthar.

== Trekking and mountaineering ==
Nearly 500 people had summited Pumori by 2005, at a cost of 42 lives. It was noted for its increasing popularity by 2008, with such features as being able to use the Everest base camp for Nepal (when occupied) when trekking or climbing Pumori and offering views of Tibet, Nepal and Everest. However, there have been some dangers from avalanches including some Spanish climbing teams that took heavy losses (such as in 1989 and 2001), and the 2015 avalanche, which was triggered by the 2015 earthquake, originated from the Pumori-Lingtren ridge.

In 1982 a group climbing to Pumori also did a ski-hike around Everest. Jim Bridwell led the climbing expedition to Pumori.

== Ascents ==
- 1962 first ascent by Gerhard Lenser of a German-Swiss expedition.
- 1974 West Face new route by Alpine Club Unpo, Japan, summit reached by Minoru Takagi and Nobuyaki Kaneko on Oct 13.
- 1982 "Saphire Bullets of Pure Love" new route/first winter ascent by Jim Bridwell, summited by Bridwell, Janet Reynolds (first woman ascent), Ned Gillette, January 6, Everest Grand Circle Expedition, book copyright 1985 Mountaineers Publishing, Seattle Washington
- 1986 East Face new route by Hiroshi Aota and Yoshiki Sasahara (Japan) over three days, summiting on December 3.
- 1986 1985 Catalan Route on East Face, solo by Todd Bibler, summit reached December 5.
- 2002 Three women (Leila Bahrami, Mitra Nazari, and Farhondeh) from an Iranian expedition reached the summit on October 20 via the southeast face to the east ridge. The Sherpas twice stopped opening the route to the team as they did not expect the women to manage the difficulties.
- 2017 First Winter Ascent of the peak was made by a Pakistani mountaineer Muhammad Ali Sadpara.

== Ski attempts ==
- 1995 Jim Zellers and Tom Burt completed the first snowboard descent of Pumori.
- 2013 Seb de Sainte Marie and Paul Holding unsuccessfully attempted to climb and ski the West Face.

== Accidents ==
- In late October 1988 two Icelandic climbers died on the mountain. They were found 30 years later, in November 2018 by an American mountaineer.
- In 1989 a team of four Spanish climbers were killed in an avalanche on Pumori, and again in September 2001 another Spanish team was killed in an avalanche.
- On 19 October 2002, five Basque mountaineers were swept 600–800 metres down the southeast face by an avalanche caused by seracs falling above them.
- On 25 April 2015 a 7.8 M_{W} earthquake struck Nepal and triggered several avalanches on and around Mount Everest, including one that hit Everest Base Camp. A witness described it as "a huge avalanche coming off Pumori". The avalanche traveled through part of the Khumbu Icefall and into the South Base Camp. At least 19 were killed.

== Gallery ==
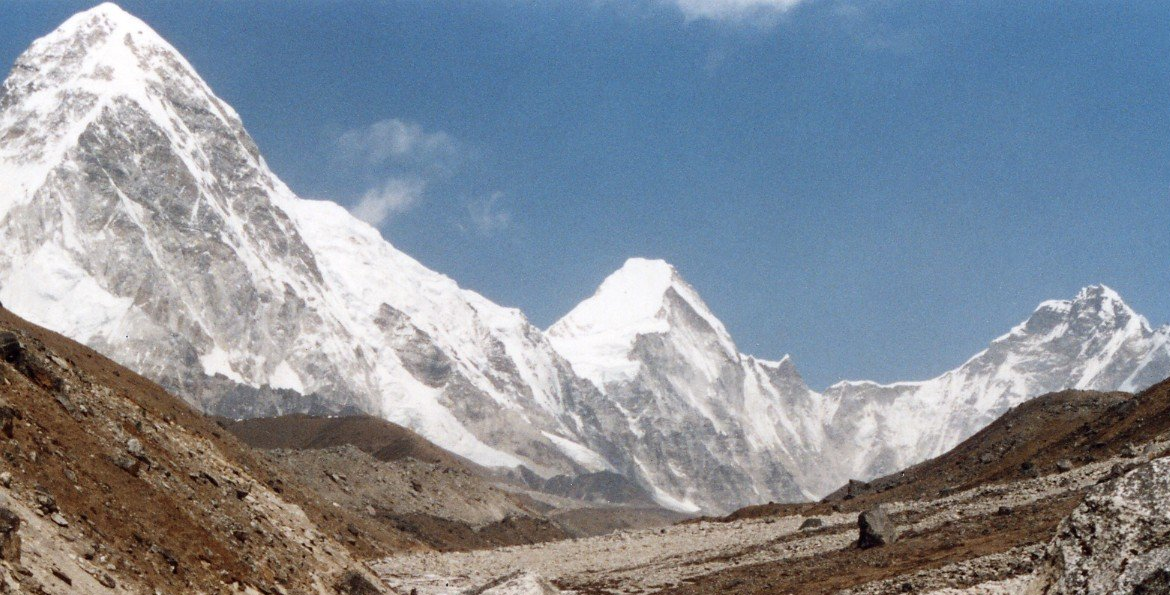
The 2015 Everest avalanche is reported to have started between Pumori (Left) and Lingtren (middle peak) Khumbutse to the right.

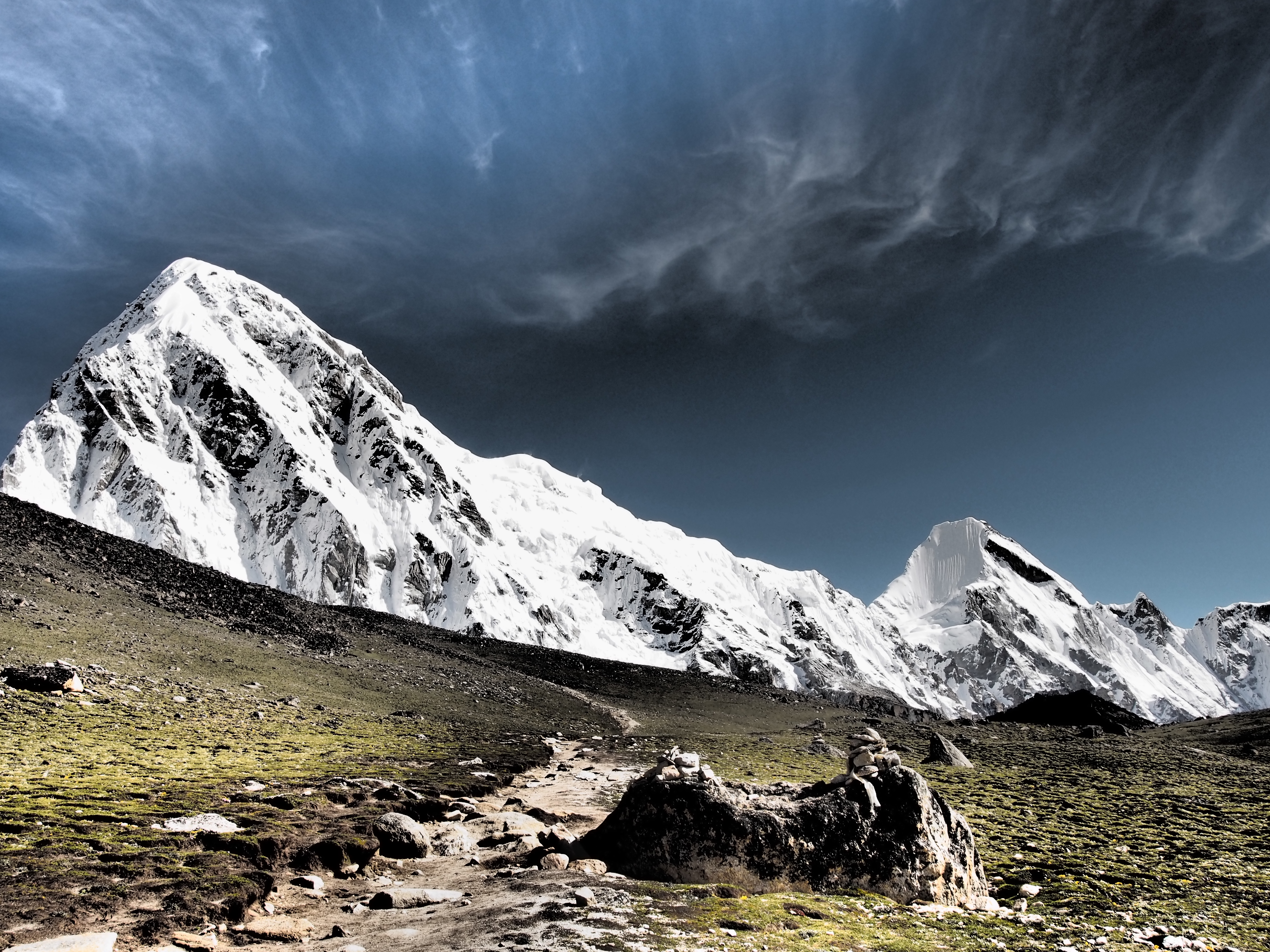
Pumori and Lingtren

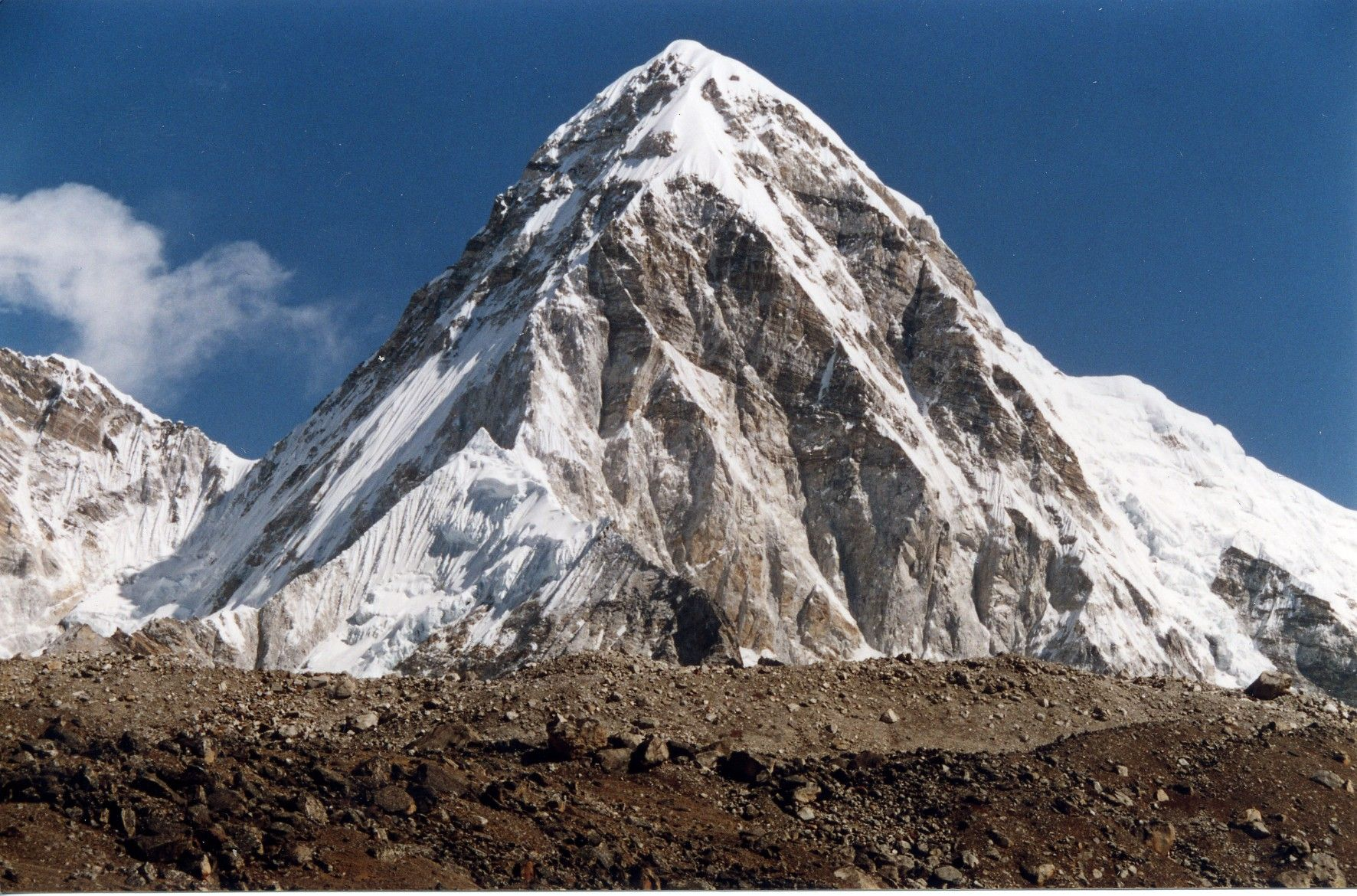
Pumori from Kala Patthar

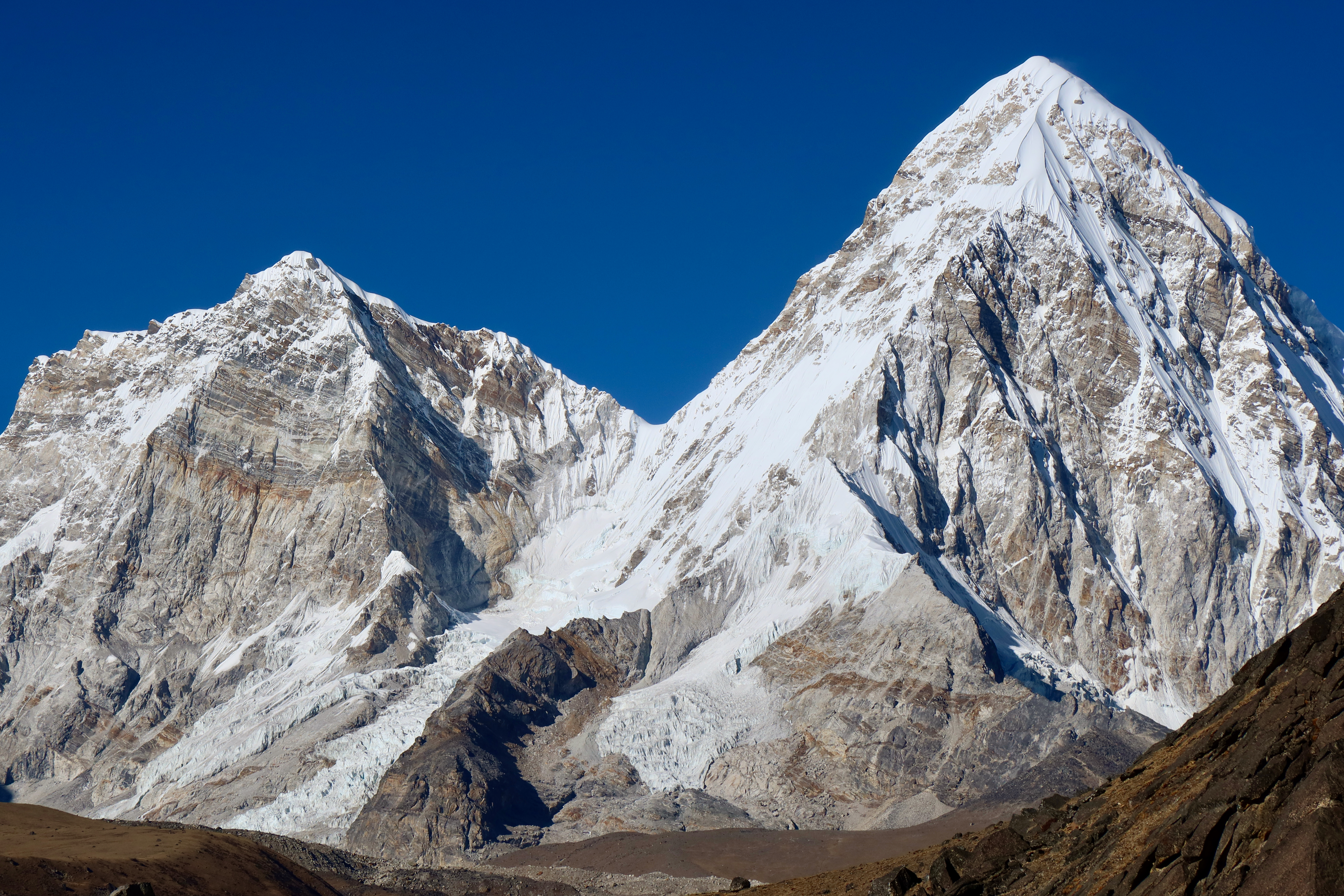
Khangri Shar (left) and Pumori
