= Changtse =

Mountain in Tibet

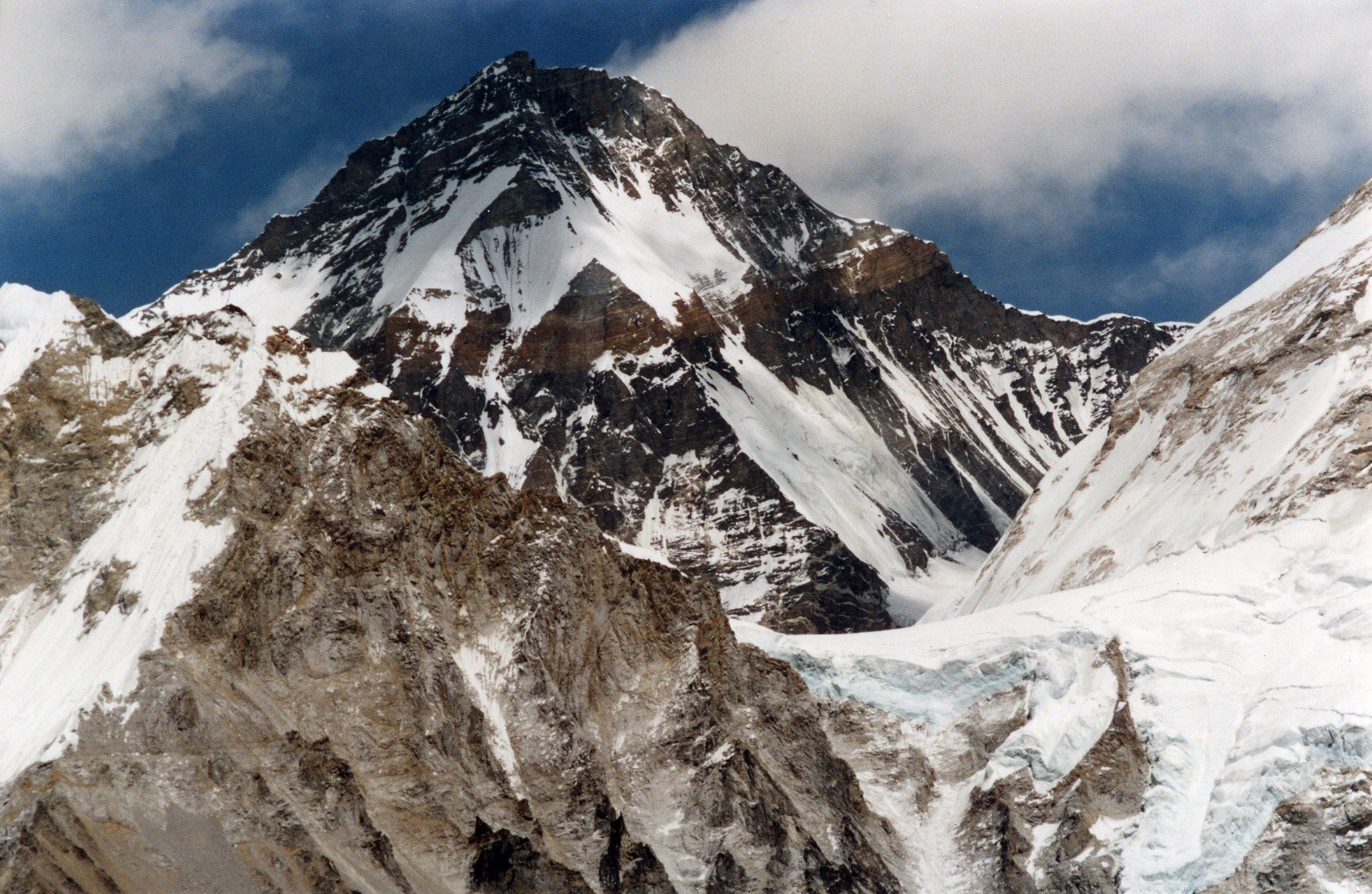

Highest point
- Elevation: 7,543 m (24,747 ft); Ranked 44th
- Prominence: 497 m (1,631 ft)
- Coordinates: 28°01′31″N 86°54′51″E

Naming
- English translation: North Peak
- Language of name: Tibetan

Geography
- Location within Tibet Location within China
- Location: Tibet Autonomous Region, China
- Parent range: Mahalangur Himal

Climbing
- First ascent: October 1982
- Easiest route: snow/ice climb

Changtse
- Traditional Chinese: 章子峰
- Simplified Chinese: 章子峰
Transcriptions

Changtse (Standard Tibetan: བྱང་རྩེ, lit. 'north peak', Chinese: 章子峰) is a mountain situated between the Main Rongbuk and East Rongbuk Glaciers in Tibet Autonomous Region, China, immediately north of Mount Everest. It is connected to Mount Everest via the North Col.

The given elevation of 7,543 metres is from modern Chinese mapping. Some authorities give 7,583 metres instead.

The Changtse Glacier flows north into the East Rongbuk Glacier. It is possible that the third highest lake in the world is in the Changtse Glacier at 6,216 metres (20,394 ft).

== Timeline ==
- 1924 George Mallory and Andrew Irvine first to set foot on Changtse. They climbed the east ridge of Changtse to reconnoiter camp sites on the East Rongbuk Glacier.
- 1935 During the Mount Everest Reconnaissance a team with Eric Shipton, Edmund Wigram and Bill Tilman attempted the North Peak from their Camp IIA . On August 21 they got to within 1,500 feet (460 m) of the summit before very deep and soft snow forced them to turn back.
- 1952 Reconnaissance of Changtse via Changtse Glacier by Edmund Hillary and George Lowe and a group of Sherpas. They reached an estimated elevation of 21,500 feet (6,600 m) before turning back after running low on supplies.
- 1982 The first ascent of Changtse was unofficially made on October 3, 1982, by Johan Taks of the Dutch Everest Expedition who were officially climbing the north side of Everest. However, Taks climbed Changtse without a permit.
- 1982 The first official ascent of Changtse with a permit was completed 11 days later on October 14 by five members of a German expedition Udo Zehetleitner, Paul Braun, Rudolf Frick, Ludwig Hösle and Martin Engler. The ascent was made via the four kilometre-long NE Ridge from the junction of the East Rongbuk Glacier and Changtse Glacier.
- 1983 The next ascent (but illegal) and also the first solo was made by Chilean climber Gino Casassa May 14, 1983 by the same route used by the Germans.
- 1986 Changtse was climbed again by a large Chinese-Japanese expedition in 1986. This expedition put eight Japanese and 16 Chinese on the summit May 10 and May 11, 1986, again via the NE Ridge from the Changtse Glacier. Also included the first ascent by a woman, Mrs. Gunsung.
- 1986 American climber Ed Webster made the first solo ascent via the SE face from the foot of the North Col on August 28, 1986. Most of this climb was done at night, taking advantage of more stable snow and ice conditions.
- 1987 Australian climbers Rob Turner and Glen Nash reached the summit September 29, 1987 via the north face icewall (Japanese 1986 route) despite high winds.

== Overview ==
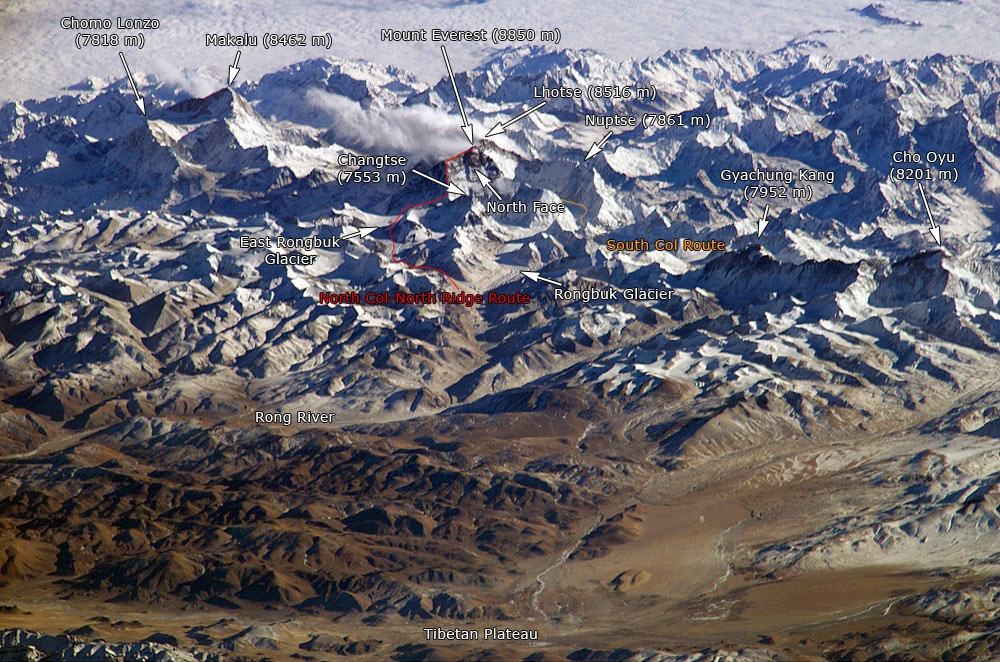

Southern and northern climbing routes as seen from the International Space Station. (The names on the photo are links to corresponding pages.)

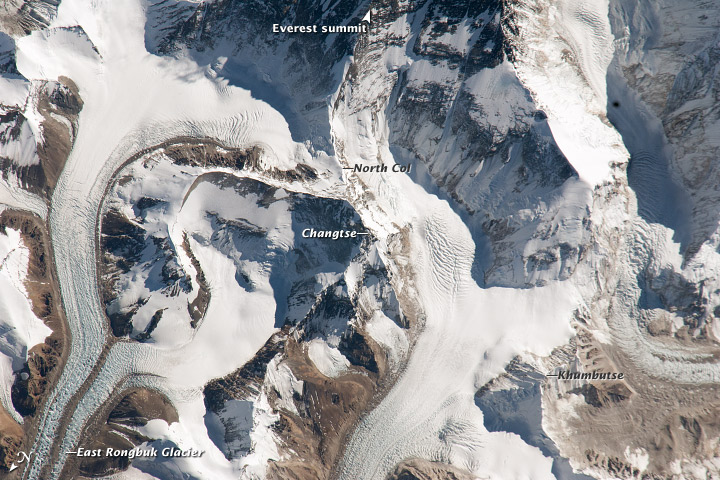
Changtse

== Bibliography ==
- Astill, Tony. Mount Everest : The Reconnaissance 1935. Published by the Author, 2005. ISBN 0-9549201-0-4
