= Khumbu Glacier =

Highest glacier in the Himalayas

Khumbu
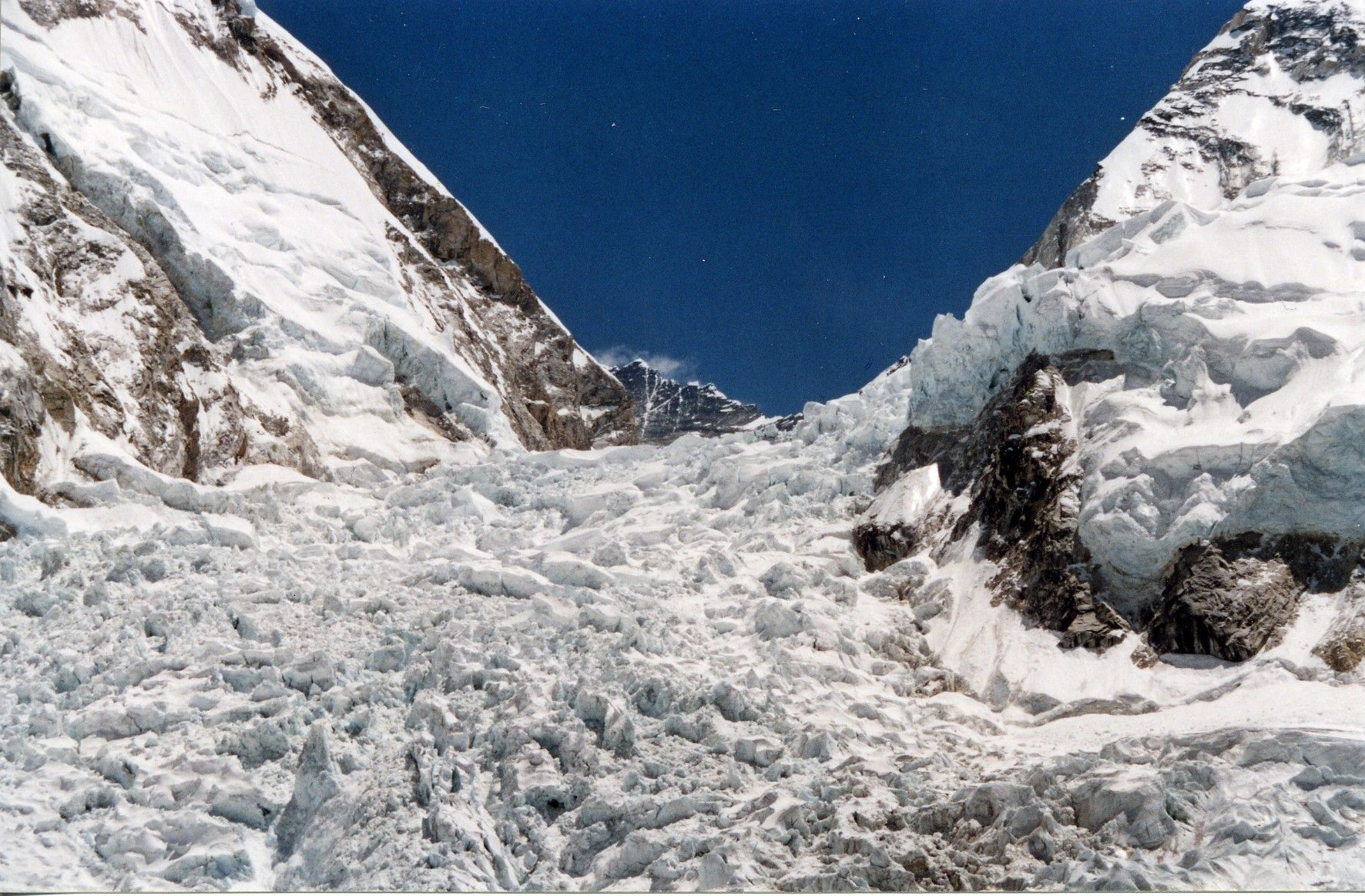
- Icefall of Khumbu glacier

- Location within Nepal Location within Tibet
- Interactive map of Khumbu
- Type: Valley glacier
- Location: Nepal
- Coordinates: 27°57′32″N 86°49′29″E

The Khumbu Glacier (Nepali: खुम्बु हिमनदी) is located in the Khumbu region of northeastern Nepal between Mount Everest and the Lhotse-Nuptse ridge. With elevations of 4,900 m (16,100 ft) at its terminus to 7,600 m (24,900 ft) at its source, it is the world's highest glacier. The Khumbu Glacier is followed for the final part of the trail to one of the Everest Base Camps. The start of the glacier is in the Western Cwm near Everest. The glacier has a large icefall, the Khumbu Icefall, at the west end of the lower Western Cwm. This icefall is the first major obstacle—and among the more dangerous—on the standard south col route to the Everest summit. It is also the largest glacier in Nepal.

The end of Khumbu Glacier is located at 27°55′55″N 86°48′18″E.

== Overview ==
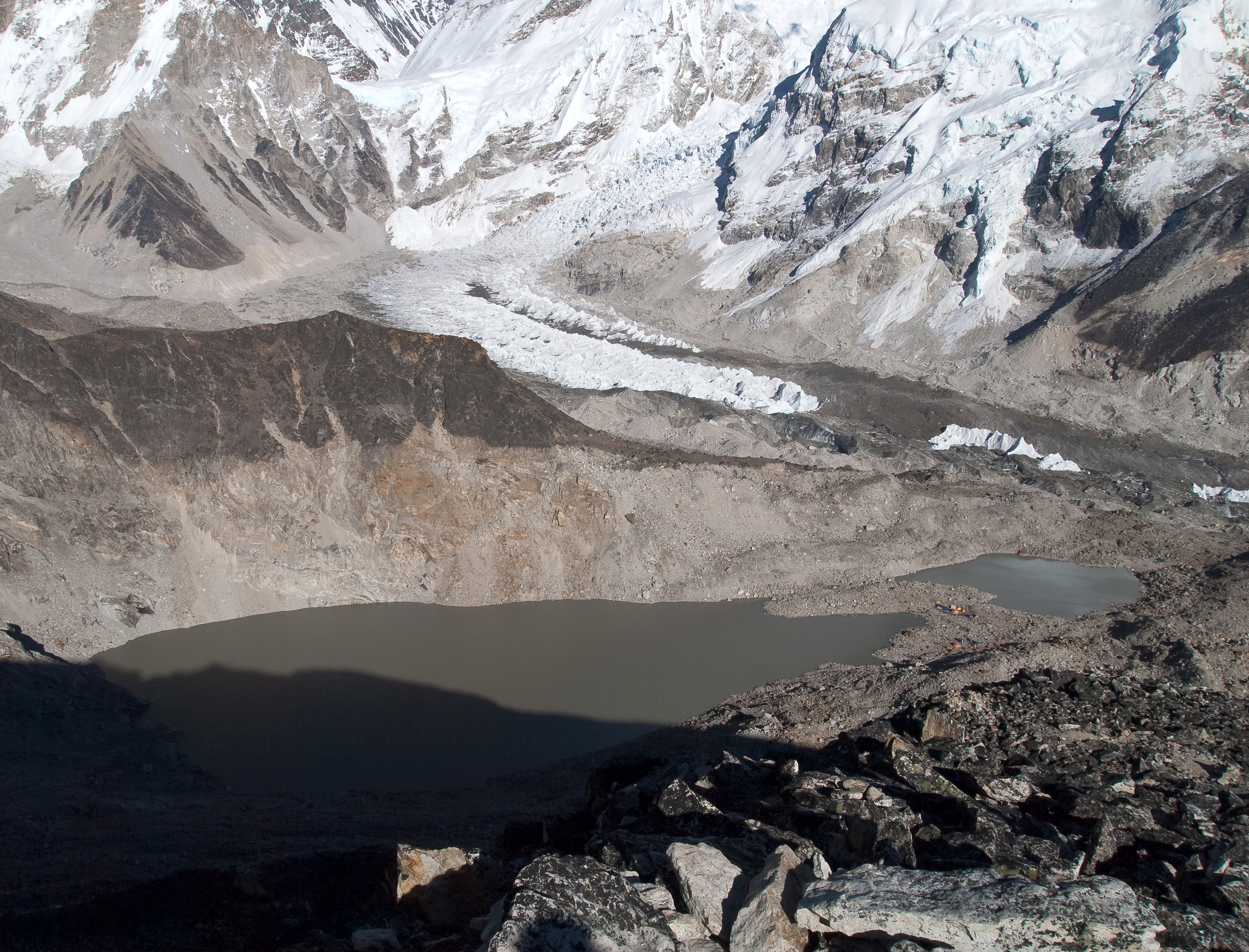
Khumbu Glacier and Khumbu Icefall

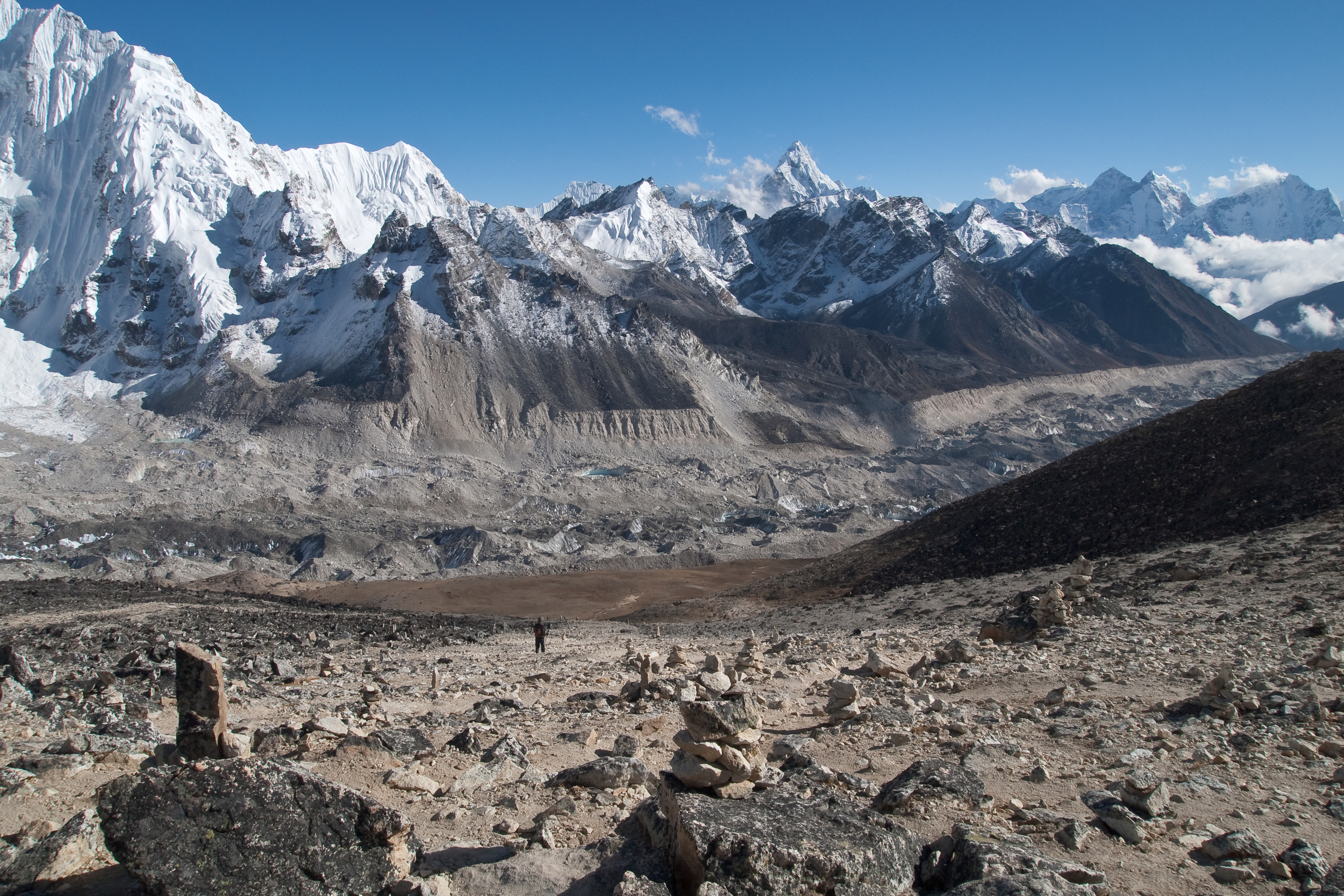
Khumbu Glacier

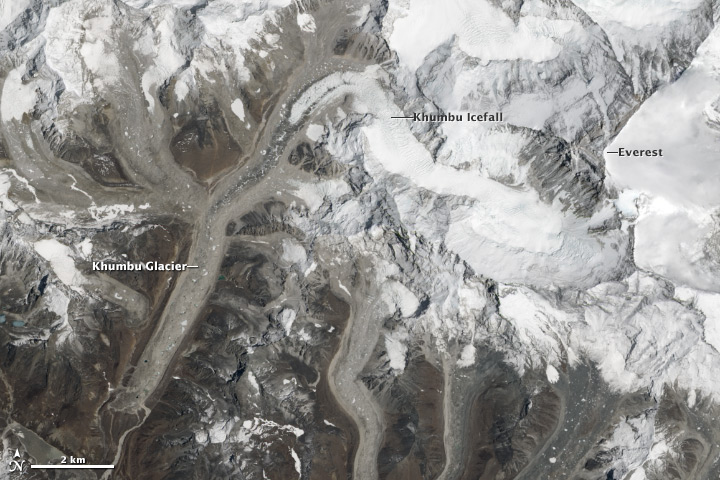
Map

== See also ==
- Glaciers of the Himalayas
- List of glaciers
- Retreat of glaciers since 1850
