= Mount Everest reconnaissance from Nepal =

Post-WWII expeditions prior to first ascent

After World War II, with Tibet closing its borders and Nepal becoming considerably more open, Mount Everest reconnaissance from Nepal became possible for the first time culminating in the successful ascent of 1953. In 1950 there was a highly informal trek to what was to become Everest Base Camp and photographs were taken of a possible route ahead. Next year the 1951 British Mount Everest reconnaissance expedition reconnoitred various possible routes to Mount Everest from the south and the only one they considered feasible was the one via the Khumbu Icefall, Western Cwm and South Col. In 1952, while the Swiss were making an attempt on the summit that nearly succeeded, the 1952 British Cho Oyu expedition practised high-altitude Himalayan techniques on Cho Oyu, nearby to the west.

== Himalayan mountaineering after World War II ==
During the 1930s Eric Shipton had become the pre-eminent Everest mountaineer although he was nowhere near as well known to the general public as George Mallory – Shipton's fame would come following his 1951 Everest reconnaissance – but in mountaineering circles he was highly respected. He had been on all four Everest expeditions of the 1930s and had led one of them. However, he was not so well regarded as a leader by some of the mountaineering establishment in London who were elderly and had a rather military approach to climbing mountains. Shipton was a keen exponent of informal, lightweight trekking with an emphasis on small parties and on exploration rather than on reaching summits.

Prompted by Shipton, in 1945 the London-based Alpine Club asked the Viceroy of India, Lord Wavell, to approve a proposal for an attempt on Everest in 1947. It would be led by Shipton and approach the mountain from the north through Tibet. Wavell replied that an expedition would be impossible because of the current political unrest – this was the situation that would lead to the Partition of India in 1947.

All pre–World War II Everest expeditions had been from the north but in 1949, alarmed that the communists seemed to be gaining control in China, Tibet expelled all Chinese officials and closed its borders to foreigners. In October 1950 Tibet was occupied by the People's Republic of China and its borders remained closed indefinitely.

As for an approach from the south, for over one hundred years Nepal, ruled by the Rana dynasty, had not allowed explorers or mountaineers into the country. However, by 1946 a possible communist-sponsored revolution was even less welcome than Western influence so Nepal opened diplomatic discussions with the United States. Privately hoping to be able to use Nepal as a Cold War launching point for missiles, the United States welcomed the new situation. (Note: According to Isserman & Weaver (2008) "Nepal's first gesture of a new openness to Western contact was made to the United States. The American chargé d'affaires in New Delhi, George R. Merrell, traveled to Kathmandu in 1946 to discuss the establishment of formal diplomatic relations between the United States and Nepal, initiated on a limited basis the following year. Chargé d'affaires Merrell was convinced that the Himalaya was a region of vital strategic importance to the United States in the emerging cold war with the Soviet Union and allied Communist nations; in a cable to Washington in January 1947 he argued that 'in an age of rocket warfare,' Tibet might provide a valuable launching pad for American missiles. He may have harbored similar thoughts regarding Nepal; in any case, he worked diligently to broaden contacts between the two countries on both the official and informal levels.") Scientific expeditions became permitted but two requests in 1948 from Switzerland and Britain for purely mountaineering expeditions were refused. A year later mountaineers were allowed if they were accompanying scientific travellers. In 1950 Nepal gave permission for the French Annapurna expedition and Annapurna I became the first eight-thousander summit to be climbed.

An approach to Mount Everest from the south offered several advantages – the walk-in from the nearest roads was shorter, the country was lush and pleasant compared with the barren Tibetan plateau, there would be more sunshine during the actual climb, and the rock strata dipped to the north so that there would be a better footing generally.

== 1950 Houston–Tilman exploration of Solu Khumbu ==
Trekking route from railhead at Jogbani to Khumbu Glacier

The British Joint Himalayan Committee, successor to the Mount Everest Committee, was given permission for an expedition to explore the region north of Annapurna – Annapurna IV, Manaslu and Himalchuli – at the same time as the French attempt on the mountain itself. Bill Tilman, the leader, was returning home after the expedition when he happened to meet Oscar Houston, an American lawyer, in Kathmandu. Houston was planning a trekking holiday in Nepal with his son and two family friends, Betsy Cowles and Anderson Bakewell, to explore the Solu Khumbu valley just south of Mount Everest. Houston had met Tilman in 1936 when his son, Charlie Houston, had participated with him in the British–American Himalayan Expedition to Nanda Devi and he invited Tilman to join the party. Despite his reservations about what was planned – Oscar was sixty-seven, though very active for his years, and, moreover, Tilman had never been on an expedition that included a woman – Tilman grasped the opportunity. Previous Everest explorations from the north, particularly the 1921 expedition and the 1935 expedition, had identified a theoretical route up the Western Cwm but no one had been able to see if it was actually feasible.

Area in Nepal close to Everest showing route taken in 1950

On 29 October 1950 the party of five met up at Jogbani, the railhead on the India–Nepal border. With six Sherpas from Darjeeling they went by road to Dharan where they took on eighteen local porters for the trek via Dhankuta (Note: In their reports Cowles, Houston and Tilman all commented on the school in Dhankuta where English and Mathematics were taught and where, written on the wall, was the slogan "Gather courage, don't be a chicken-hearted fellow.") to the Arun River, which they crossed in a dugout canoe, and then trekked beside the Dudh Kosi river to Namche Bazaar. They found the village had prospered because it had been a trading point with Tibet, over the Nangpa La pass. Also Sherpas based in Darjeeling who were recruited for mountaineering expeditions would remit home some of their earnings. From Namche Bazaar, Charlie Houston and Tilman went ahead with four porters and arrived at Tengboche Monastery on the Imja Khola where they were the first Western visitors. Tilman found the monastery "incomparably more beautiful and less austere" than Rongbuk Monastery in Tibet, familiar from earlier Everest expeditions. They then went further up the valley to just below the snout of the Khumbu Glacier. Cowles wrote of Tengboche "Our days at the lamassery were a delight, the beauty of the scene around us and the warm happy spirit of the place itself combining to make our stay there something never to be forgotten. ... The head lama, a young man of about sixteen, received us and we sipped Tibetan tea together in a ceremony in which chanting featured and a strange sort of rhythmic music from horns, cymbals, bells and drums. ... Each evening was especially memorable for, after the sun had set, the great rock face would go on blazing away long after the rest of the mountain world was in darkness around us."

Tilman's photograph (cropped) with South Col not visible and South Pillar (sloping down from top left) obscuring the Southeast ridge

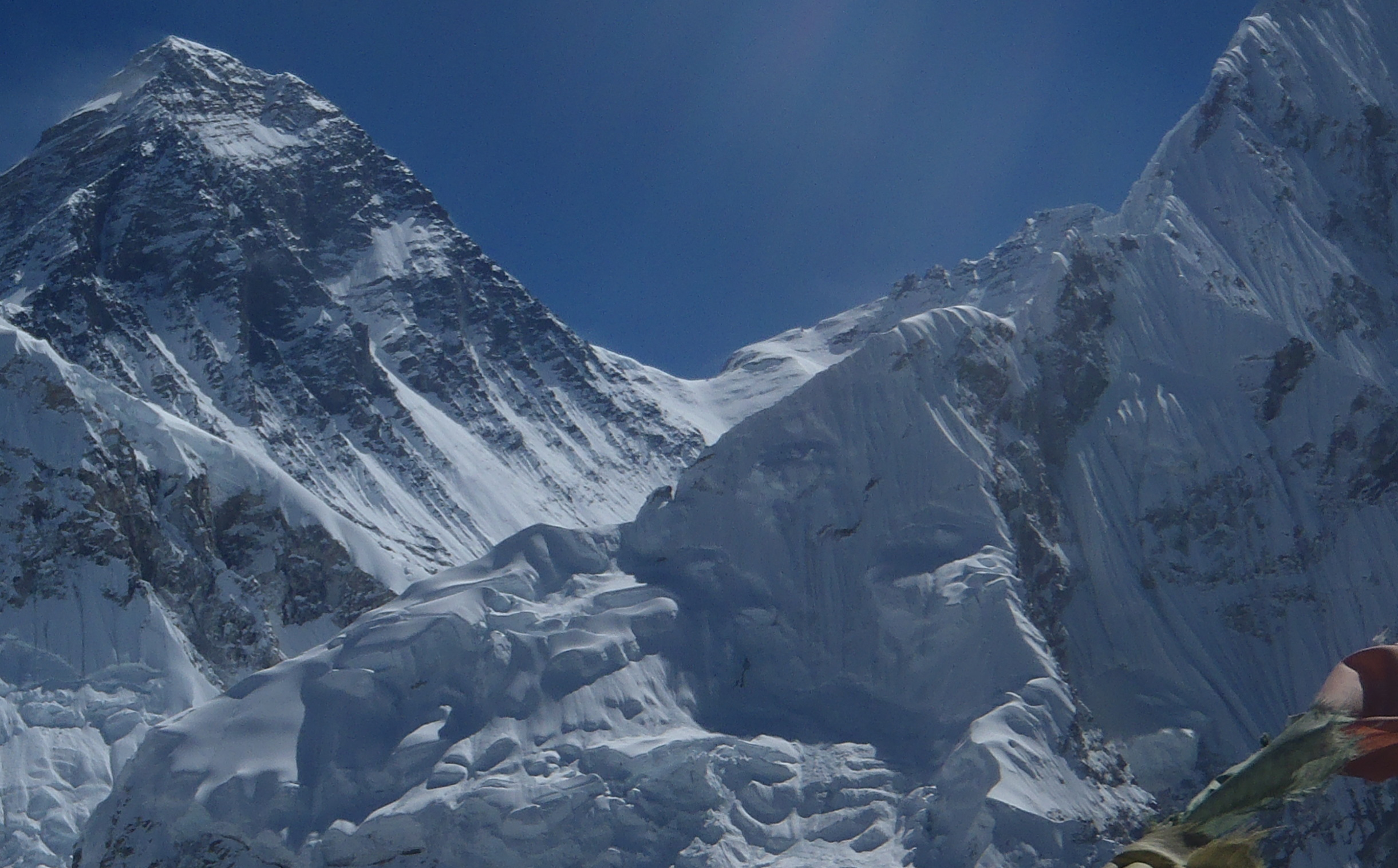
Photograph from summit of Kala Pattar showing South Col

The first time Tilman and Houston ascended the Khumbu Glacier to about a mile from the Lho La they failed to see the gap to the Western Cwm so narrow was the entrance. However, the next day they found the opening with no difficulty. On the last day before they had to start their return they climbed Kala Patar, 18,192 feet (5,545 m), the side peak of Pumori. Because Houston was not yet acclimatised they had to stop about 300 feet (91 m) below the top from where Tilman took a crucial photograph. The upper part of the Western Cwm was hidden and much of the southern side of Everest was obscured by Nuptse – what view there was shown a probably unclimbable steep rocky ridge dropping from near the summit of Everest and possibly leading to the South Col. (Note: The South Col can be seen from the summit of Kalar Patar but not from their lower vantage point and so they could not be sure of the topography.) If there was an easier ridge behind it and further up the Cwm they thought it might not be possible to reach it. Regarding the Khumbu Icefall where the glacier drops steeply from the Cwm, they decided a way through could be forced.

Mindful of the revolution in Nepal and the Korean War, after their return Cowles wrote "Against the dark and troubled background of the uneasy times in which we live, our days in eastern Nepal remain a happy memory towards which our thoughts constantly return in joy and gratitude".

== 1951 British Mount Everest reconnaissance expedition ==
The discoveries of Tilman and Houston, combined with an analysis of aerial photographs, led to a British reconnaissance expedition in 1951. Led by Eric Shipton the party reconnoitred various possible routes to Mount Everest from Nepal and the only one they considered feasible was via the Khumbu Icefall, Western Cwm and South Col. Shipton reported back to the Himalayan Committee that they had found "a practicable route from the West Cwm to the summit of Mount Everest". They hoped to make a summit attempt in 1952.

== 1952 Cho Oyu reconnaissance ==
In May 1951 Nepal had already accepted a Swiss application to attempt Everest in 1952. Helpfully, Shipton went to Zurich to tell the Swiss of his discoveries and there were discussions about various proposals for a combined Swiss–British team but nothing came of these. Instead, Nepal gave permission for a British attempt on Cho Oyu in 1952 followed by Everest in 1953.

In preparation for Everest in 1953, Cho Oyu was used to test climbers and equipment, particularly oxygen sets. With Shipton in charge they established base camp on 29 April 1952 and made an unsuccessful attempt up the southwest ridge. Worried about being spotted by Chinese troops, Shipton was unwilling to mount a full scale attempt from Tibet where the climbing seemed easier although he allowed an exploratory party led by Ed Hillary which, hampered by the lack of logistical support, had to turn back at 22,400 feet (6,800 m). Hillary later said he felt "almost a sense of shame that we'd allowed ourselves to admit defeat so easily".

Griffith Pugh had been the expedition physiologist, preparing for this role again in 1953. His formal recommendations to the Himalayan Committee included: fitness and team spirit essential; oxygen equipment necessary above South Col; closed-circuit oxygen favoured; clothing to be individually tailored; general and food hygiene important; climbers must acclimatise above 15,000 feet (4,600 m) for at least 36 days; poor acclimatisation should not lead to rejection – cause could be temporary illness.

== 1952 Swiss Mount Everest expeditions ==
The Swiss mounted two attempts on Everest, pre and post-monsoon in 1952. The march-in was from Kathmandu and they established the route slightly south of Jiri which became the standard route for over 20 years (see 1975 expedition for a map). The spring attempt was led by Edouard Wyss-Dunant with Tenzing Norgay promoted to sirdar for the first time. At the head of the Western Cwm they avoided the Lhotse glacier by taking a more direct route up a buttress they named l'Éperon des Genevois to a point slightly above the South Col. This line of ascent unfortunately turned out to have no adequate site for an intermediate camp. Raymond Lambert and Tenzing eventually reached a height later estimated to have been about 27,910 feet (8,510 m) on the southeast ridge. In the autumn, led by Gabrielle Chevalley and with Tenzing as both sirdar and full member of the climbing team, one Sherpa was killed by a falling serac and three others were injured when they themselves fell. The expedition then took Shipton's proposed route to the South Col but made little progress any higher.

In the summer of 1952 Shipton had asked Tenzing if he would be sirdar for the 1953 expedition but Tenzing had got on so well with the Swiss that he said he would wait for their next attempt. However, Lambert persuaded him that he should take his earliest chance, regardless of who would be with him.
