= 1951 British Mount Everest reconnaissance expedition =

First major reconnaissance from Nepal

The 1951 British Mount Everest reconnaissance expedition ran between 27 August 1951 and 21 November 1951 with Eric Shipton as leader.

The expedition reconnoitred various possible routes for climbing Mount Everest from Nepal concluding that the one via the Khumbu Icefall, Western Cwm and South Col was the only feasible choice. This route was then used by the Swiss in their two expeditions in 1952 followed by the successful ascent by the British in 1953.

== Background ==
After World War II, with Tibet closing its borders and Nepal becoming considerably more open, the reconnaissance of Mount Everest from Nepal had become possible for the first time.

In 1950 a highly informal trek involving Charlie Houston and Bill Tilman reached what was to become Everest Base Camp on the Khumbu Glacier. Although their report about whether the summit could be reached from there was not very encouraging, they thought an attempt might nonetheless be viable.

=== Topographical knowledge in 1951 ===
By 1951 the location of the South Col was well known – it had been seen from the east in Tibet and photographed from the air – but it had never been possible to view its western side. There remained three main aspects of a route to Everest via the Western Cwm where the difficulties were unknown: the Khumbu Icefall, the climb up to the South Col, and the ascent to the final ridge.

The best evidence about the Icefall was from Tilman and Houston, who were the only people to have seen it close up and who considered it difficult but achievable. The Western Cwm had been glimpsed several times, but it was not clear whether its floor was relatively flat or if it sloped up towards the head of the glacier below the South Col. A pronounced slope might make ascending the valley more awkward but it would reduce the height to be climbed at the head of the valley. Regarding the final ridge, the pair had seen a very steep ridge, quite possibly unclimbable, but they realized that appearances might have been deceptive (Note: What they were looking at is now known as the South Pillar (or South Buttress) and it was first climbed in 1980. It descends steeply in a southwest direction from Everest's South Summit to the floor of the Western Cwm. The Southeast ridge goes from the true summit to the South Col and has a more moderate slope.): the ridge observed might have been blocking the view of a true ridge from the South Col to the summit. The 1921 reconnaissance had ascended the Kama valley east of Everest to approach the Kangshung Face. Observing the South Col from that side, they had seen a seemingly easier ridge linking it to the summit.

In early 1951, Everest enthusiast Michael Ward was carefully studying relevant photographs and maps (the Milne-Hink map) in the Royal Geographical Society archives when he happened to find some photographs taken clandestinely by the RAF in 1945. One of these showed the north face of Lhotse and part of the terrain between the head of the Western Cwm and the South Col. Another showed a broad, snow-covered ridge (the Southeast ridge) stretching from the summit down to the South Col, and a clearly separate steeper ridge falling from near the summit down into the Western Cwm.

=== Expedition preparations ===
On the basis of this photographic evidence, Ward proposed to the Himalayan Committee that a reconnaissance expedition make direct inspections from the ground. Despite support from Bill Murray and Campbell Secord, the committee was reluctant to ask for approval from Nepal and were surprised when permission was granted; Ward believed the committee had hoped it would be refused. Murray was to be leader, with Ward, Secord, Tom Bourdillon, and Alfred Tissierès forming the initial party but when Eric Shipton turned up (after having been expelled from his post as British consul in Kunming, China) he was persuaded to take on the leadership. Shipton's prestige helped gain sponsorship from The Times.

Trekking route from railhead at Jogbani to Khumbu Glacier

Shipton himself, discouraged by Tilman's discoveries, was not hopeful of finding a route – he rated the chances as 30 to one – but he was very keen to visit Solu Khumbu, the home of his pre-war Sherpa friends. Secord (from Canada) and Tissierès (from Switzerland) had to withdraw. Keen to keep the party small, Shipton rejected various distinguished applicants, resulting in a party which now comprised only Shipton plus Tom Bourdillon, Bill Murray and Michael Ward.

Only after leaving for Delhi he agreed to accept two additional climbers – self-selected from the four New Zealand climbers who were just completing an expedition in Garhwal Himalaya (Note: Shipton had met Dan Bryant on the 1935 British Mount Everest reconnaissance expedition and had formed a positive view of New Zealand climbers.) It was Earle Riddiford and Ed Hillary (Note: The other two climbers were Edmund Cotter and George Lowe; Lowe had wanted to go instead of Riddiford, but could not pay his share of the costs.) who hurried to meet the rest of the team. With Ang Tharkay as sirdar and twelve Sherpas, the main party departed Jogbani on 27 August 1951; the New Zealanders caught up with them on 8 September at Dingla.

Hillary was nervous about meeting Shipton, the most famous living Himalayan mountaineer, and was worried his own colonial upbringing might not be up to the standards expected by the English. He wrote later "As we came into the room, four figures rose to meet us. My first feeling was one of relief. I had rarely seen a more disreputable bunch, and my visions of changing for dinner faded away for ever".

== Expedition ==
=== Khumbu Glacier and Icefall ===
The party took the same route as Houston and Tilman except for a minor detour at Dingla to avoid a bridge that had been swept away. After a month-long trek in the late monsoon they reached Namche Bazaar, and on 30 September Shipton and Hillary climbed sufficiently far up Pumori that they had the first good view up the Western Cwm. (Note: They had ascended 2,000 feet (610 m) higher than Tilman and Houston.) The Cwm sloped to a height of about 23,000 feet (7,000 m), which was 2,000 feet (610 m) higher than expected, so that a climb up the Lhotse glacier to about 25,000 feet (7,600 m) would lead to a traverse to the South Col. This was all encouraging but the Icefall looked to be a problem. All the same, Hillary was already able to look forward to a summit attempt in 1952.

Meanwhile, Riddiford and Sherpa Pasang had found a way through most of the lower icefall, but on 4 October Shipton, Hillary, Riddiford and Bourdillon with three Sherpas had reached 30 feet (9 m) below the crest of the icefall when a relatively minor avalanche decided Shipton to turn back. He was unwilling to risk the lives of the inexperienced Sherpas who could not make an informed decision about the considerable unavoidable risks. From Shipton's point of view they had determined that a possible route had been found, it could not be attempted in the conditions of deep snow then prevailing, and he wanted to see if there were alternative routes to the top from the east or west.

=== Exploration of Everest's southern foothills ===
Routes reconnoitred near Everest

Ward, Bourdillon, Riddiford and Murray started a three-week trek by heading west from the Khumbu valley, trying to find the Chola Khola. At the head of this valley they had been told (wrongly) that there was a pass into Tibet, presumably to the West Rongbuk Glacier. However, their map was inaccurate, and they had in fact reached the Ngojumba glacier, the main source of the Dudh Khosi river, at the foot of Cho Oyu. They went north along Cho Oyu's east face but could see no route towards its summit. They then headed for Nup La (Note: Nup La is a col that had been reached from Tibet during the 1924 British Mount Everest expedition but it had not been crossed. It was first crossed by Hillary and George Lowe during the 1952 Cho Oyu expedition;.) but progress was slowed by two considerable icefalls so they abandoned the attempt and travelled back to Namche Bazaar improving the mapping of the Chola Khola region as they went.

Meanwhile, Shipton and Hillary descended the Khumbu and then travelled east up the Imja glacier which is south of the Lhotse–Nuptse wall. They hoped to find a pass over to the Barun glacier and thence a further pass west of Pethangse. (Note: Pethangtse lies on the ridge between Lhotse and Makalu. A pass east of Pethangtse had been reached from the Kama valley by the 1921 British Mount Everest reconnaissance expedition.) However, they found no crossing to the Barun and so headed south down the Hongu glacier until eventually reaching the Barun. Since they were too far south to reach Pethangtse in the time available, they returned to Khumbu by crossing the south ridge of Ama Dablam.

The entire party met up again and made another attempt to climb the Khumbu Icefall, but found there had been a major collapse of ice and the area was highly unstable. A few days later, on 28 October, conditions had improved and they reached the top of the icefall only to encounter a 100-yard (90 m) crevasse splitting the glacier from side to side and separating it from the almost horizontally-flowing glacier in the Western Cwm itself. They retreated after forming the opinion that ice conditions might be more stable for a springtime expedition, after the consolidation of the winter snows. On 30 October they were back at Namche Bazaar.

=== Kathmandu via the Gaurishankar range ===
The party was to return home via Kathmandu to the west so they traversed the completely unexplored region between the Bhote Koshi river of Sola Khumbu and the Rongshar valley in Tibet. They crossed a new pass, naming it the Menlung La, and one side expedition reached the Nangpa La (which had been incorrectly positioned on their map) and spotted two possible routes up the northwest face of Cho Oyu. Another group discovered and named Menlungtse. They discovered and photographed some animal tracks that they could not identify, but which the Sherpas said were of a yeti. Passing north of Gaurishankar they headed southwest and then west to reach Kathmandu on 21 November.

== Aftermath ==
=== Preparations for 1953 expedition ===
Even while they were still investigating the Khumbu Icefall, Shipton reported back to the Himalayan Committee that they had found "a practicable route from the West Cwm to the summit of Mount Everest". They intended to mount an expedition for 1952 to make an attempt on the summit. However, already in May 1951 Nepal had accepted a Swiss application to attempt Everest. Shipton went to Zurich to tell the Swiss of his findings and there were discussions about various ideas for a combined Swiss–British team but nothing came of the proposals. Instead, Nepal gave permission for the British Cho Oyu expedition in 1952 followed by Everest in 1953. In the longer term, all this favoured the British aspirations for Everest – the British would not have been ready in 1952 and the Swiss were to reciprocate the help Shipton had given them with practical advice about the mountain.

The 1952 Swiss Mount Everest expedition very nearly reached the summit, so the minds of the British mountaineering community and establishment became strongly focused on their 1953 slot, particularly because France had been granted an opportunity for 1954. Shipton had become well known and popular with the public and he was the obvious leader with a long and distinguished track record in Himalaya. He did, however, have broader perspectives than Everest and after Cho Oyu he did not return home but continued trekking with Hillary. Back in London things were stirring. Some climbers, including some of those on the Cho Oyu expedition, approached the Himalayan Committee about Shipton's perceived lack of drive and single-minded commitment plus poor planning and leadership in 1952 and the Committee did not disagree.

The most likely alternative leader was John Hunt, a colonel in the army who had been a member of the Alpine Club since 1935 and had mountaineering experience in the Karakoram and the Alps. He had climbed to 24,500 feet (7,500 m) and was only turned down for the 1936 British Mount Everest expedition because of an adverse (and incorrect) medical report about a heart murmur. (Note: The report had gone on to warn him to be careful climbing stairs.) During the war he had been an instructor for the Commando Mountain and Snow Warfare school in Scotland. He was well known for his organisational abilities and he was friendly with several members of the Himalayan Committee, having been climbing in the Alps with the secretary Basil Goodfellow. Another option was Charles Wylie, a climber who spoke Nepalese fluently; he became the organising secretary. Hunt and Wylie were in the Army, so were experienced in logistics (and might be available immediately and free of charge).

When Shipton returned home and was called to a meeting of the Himalayan Committee on 28 July 1952, he still did not know his leadership had been called into question. His main opponents were not present and no one liked to tell him what had been happening. Shipton, indeed, expressed his own doubts about his leadership – he preferred small, exploratory, trekking-style expeditions and disliked a competitive element. Nonetheless, the committee said he was their choice as leader and supported his proposal for Charles Evans to be co-leader. Behind the scenes Hunt was offered the co-leadership, and when the two men met and discovered they had been told different stories, they were both dismayed. Hunt thought his chance at Everest had gone. At the next meeting of the committee, it was Shipton's allies who were not there and Shipton was asked to leave the room while the leadership was discussed. When he returned he was told his involvement could only be as co-leader and even that would have to be surrendered once Base Camp had been reached. He was told a man of "dynamic personality, drive and enthusiasm" was required. The Committee went on to send a telegram to Hunt appointing him as leader without waiting for Shipton to reply. Shipton decided he would not take part in the expedition.

There was an outcry amongst active mountaineers. Bourdillon resigned his appointment to the 1953 expedition but was persuaded by Shipton to reconsider. Hillary sent a telegram "Consider change most unwise. New Zealand climbers owe you considerable debt of gratitude", although he privately criticized Shipton's leadership in his diary. Murray, however, whilst deploring the committee's methods, privately thought Hunt would be the better leader. Hunt returned to London in October and started with the preparations for the 1953 British Mount Everest expedition.
