= George Lowe (mountaineer) =

New Zealand mountaineer, explorer and film director (1924–2013)

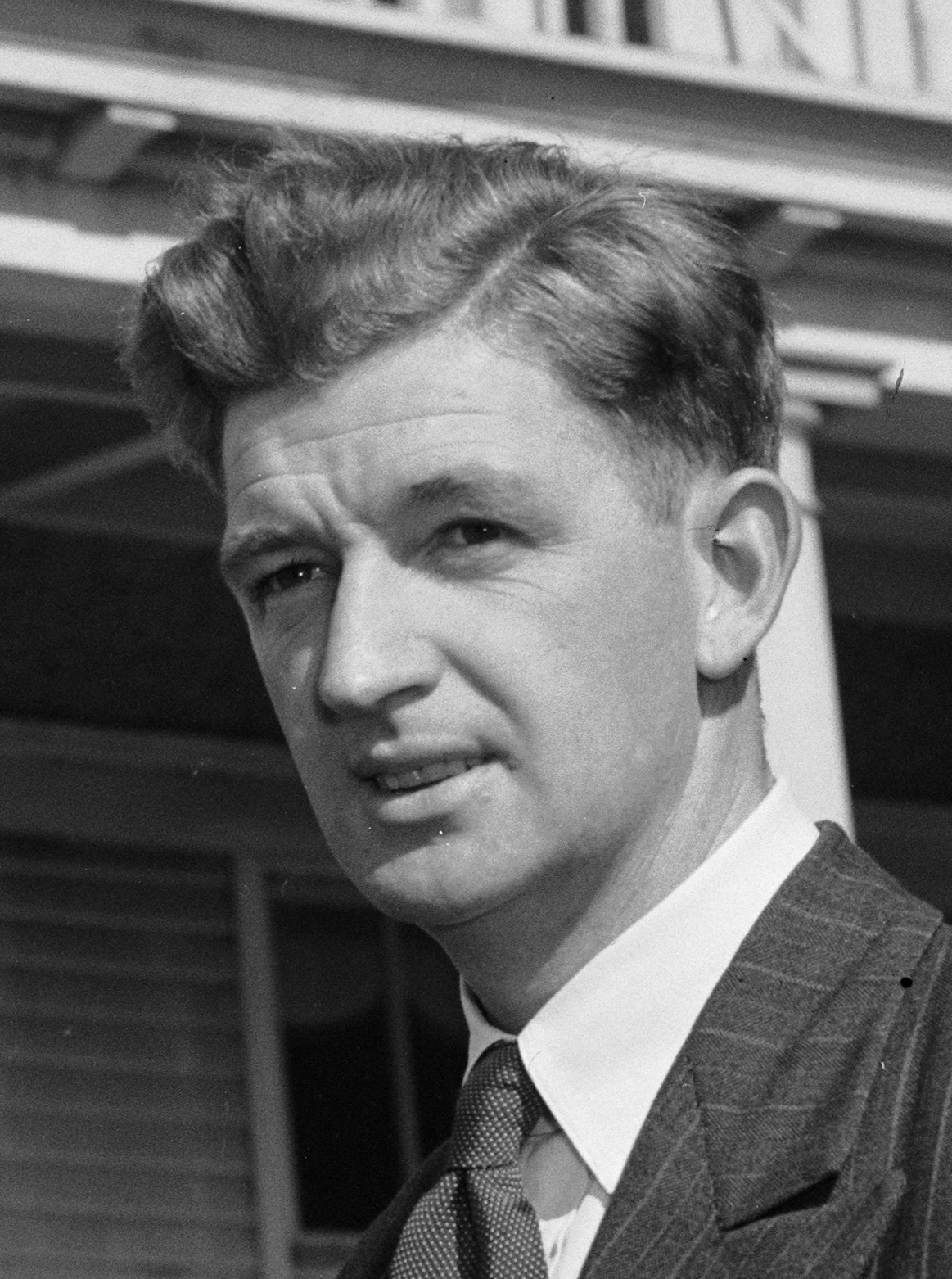
Lowe in 1953

Wallace George Lowe CNZM OBE (15 January 1924 – 20 March 2013), known as George Lowe, was a New Zealand-born mountaineer, explorer, film director and educator. He was the last surviving member of the 1953 British Mount Everest Expedition, during which his friend Edmund Hillary and Sherpa Tenzing Norgay became the first known people to summit the world's highest peak.

== Early life and expeditions ==
Born in Hastings, New Zealand, into a farming family, George Lowe was educated at Hastings High School and Wellington Teachers' College before starting work as a teacher. He spent holidays climbing in the Southern Alps, where he met fellow-New Zealander Edmund Hillary.

In 1951, along with Hillary, Lowe was a member of the first New Zealand expedition to the Himalayas. On that expedition, Earle Riddiford and Edmund Cotter made a first ascent of 7,242m Mukut Parbat in Garhwal, India, a feat which earned New Zealand two places on the 1951 British reconnaissance of Everest. Riddiford and Hillary took up this offer. The following year, Lowe went with them to Nepal as a member of the 1952 expedition to Cho Oyu aiming to explore physiology and oxygen flow rates. With Eric Shipton, the three New Zealanders explored the region around Everest.

== Everest and subsequent expeditions ==
In 1953, Lowe was a member of the 1953 British Mount Everest Expedition led by John Hunt. Hillary and Lowe were the only members who Hunt had not previously met, but were known to Shipton and others. Hunt wrote that "His ice techniques, acquired like Hillary’s from the exceptional opportunities offered by New Zealand mountains, is of a very high standard."

During the expedition, Lowe helped prepare the route from the head of the Western Cwm up the Lhotse Face towards the South Col at close to 8,000 metres (26,000 ft) altitude. On 28 May, Lowe, Alfred Gregory and Sherpa Ang Nyima, all carrying heavy loads, set out with Hillary and Tenzing as the support party for their summit attempt. Camp IX was established at 8,500 metres (27,900 ft), then Lowe, Gregory and Ang Nyima descended to the South Col. The following day, 29 May, Hillary and Tenzing successfully reached the summit of Mount Everest.

During their descent to the South Col, the two men were met by Lowe. It was then that Hillary delivered his immortal summary of their achievement: "Well, George, we knocked the bastard off." Lowe also directed a documentary film during the expedition, entitled The Conquest of Everest that was nominated for an Academy Award for Best Documentary Feature.

In 1954, Lowe again joined Hillary, on an unsuccessful New Zealand expedition to Makalu. However, during this trip, Lowe met Vivian Fuchs, who invited him to become a New Zealand representative on the Commonwealth Trans-Antarctic Expedition which, between 1955 and 1958, not only traversed Antarctica, becoming the first to reach the South Pole by land since Amundsen in 1911 and Scott in 1912, but also carried out extensive surveying of the continent. At the Pole, he was met by Hillary, who had led a route-finding party from the other direction. Lowe worked on the film of the expedition: The Crossing Of Antarctica.

In 1960, Lowe was a member of the 1960–61 Silver Hut expedition to the Himalayas with Hillary, to study high-altitude physiology with Griffith Pugh and to hunt for the Yeti around Rowaling.

During the decade, Lowe went on expeditions with the John Hunt Exploration Group for young people to Greenland, Greece and Ethiopia. He also joined Hunt on an expedition to the Pamirs with a British-Russian team.

== Trusteeship ==
In 1989, he was one of the founders of the Sir Edmund Hillary Himalayan Trust UK, a charity set up to assist development and improve infrastructure for the Sherpa people living in the Himalayas. Lowe was elected as the first chairman, serving from 1989 to 2003. He continued as a Trustee until 2008, when he succeeded Sir Chris Bonington as Patron.

== Personal life ==
Settling in England, in 1962 he married the Honourable Susan Hunt, daughter of Lord Hunt, with whom he had three sons. He went off to Chile together with Susan as Headmaster (Rector) of The Grange school in Santiago where he worked until 1966. However, after his first marriage failed, he married a second time, to Mary who was also a former teacher and schools inspector. He had himself become an Inspector of Schools for the Department of Education and Science, retiring from this post in 1984. His memoirs of the climb were published in 2013, the sixtieth anniversary of this remarkable expedition.

In 1953, Lowe was awarded the Queen Elizabeth II Coronation Medal. He was appointed an Officer of the Order of the British Empire (OBE) in the 1954 NZ New Year Honours List for the Mount Everest Expedition. In the 1958 Special Honours List he was awarded the Polar Medal as part of the Commonwealth Trans-Antarctic Expedition team. His final appointment was as a Companion of the New Zealand Order of Merit (CNZM) in the 1998 NZ New Year Honours List for services to New Zealand interests in the United Kingdom.

== Death ==
Lowe died 20 March 2013 at a nursing home in Ripley, Derbyshire, England, after battling Alzheimer's disease for several years. He was 89.
