= 1952 Swiss Mount Everest expedition =

Mountaineering expedition in 1952

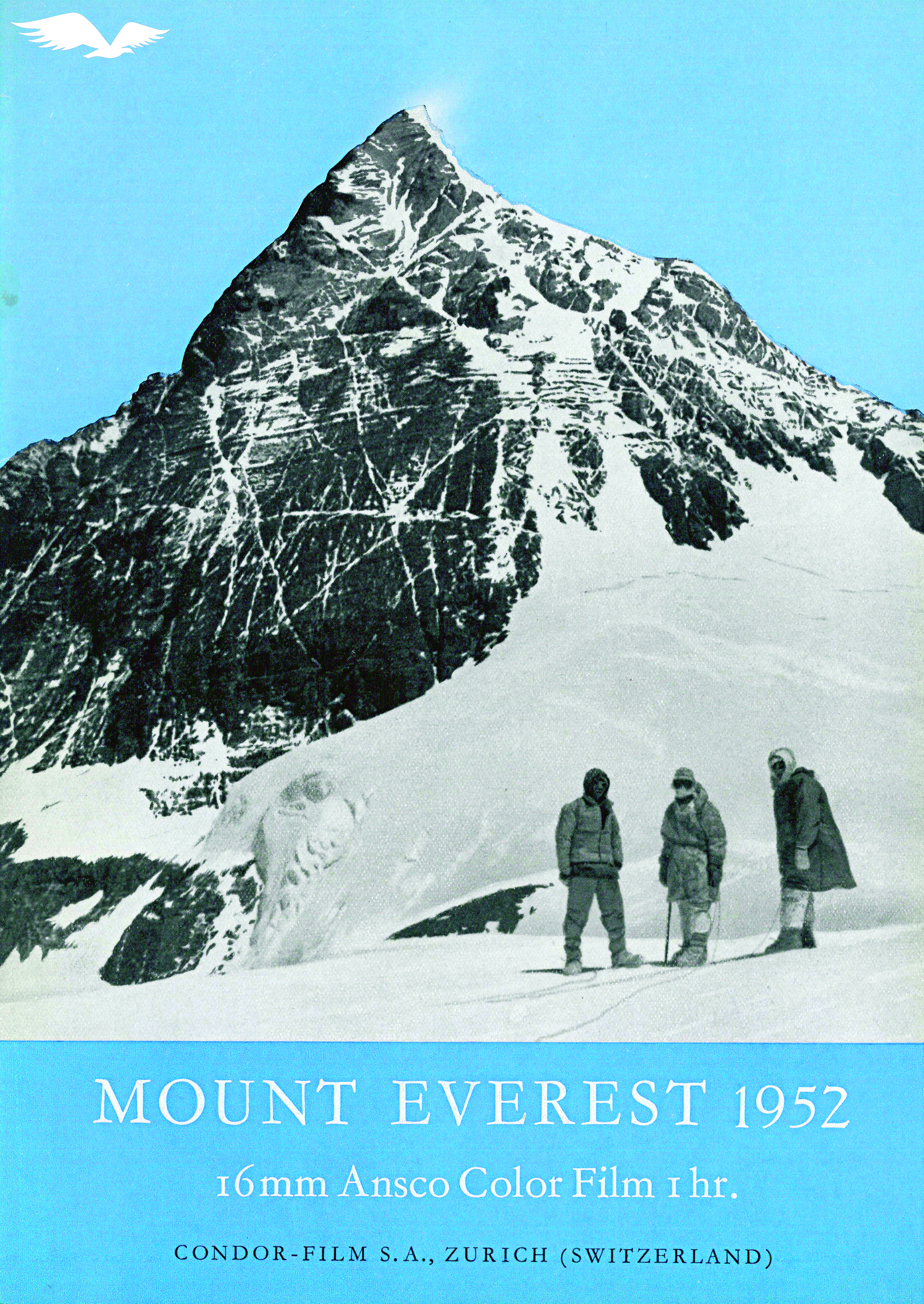

The 1952 Swiss Mount Everest expedition was an attempt to summit Mount Everest. Led by Edouard Wyss-Dunant, the expedition, which included Tenzing Norgay, reached a height of 8,595 metres (28,199 ft) on the southeast ridge, setting a new climbing altitude record and opening up a new route to Mount Everest and paving the way for further successes by other expeditions. Tenzing successfully summited the mountain the following year with Sir Edmund Hillary, the first successful expedition.

== Origins ==
Tibet was closed to foreigners, but Nepal had opened up its borders to foreigners in 1950. In 1951, Eric Shipton's British-New Zealand reconnaissance climbed the Khumbu Icefall and reached the elusive Western Cwm, proving that Everest could be climbed from Nepal. The Nepalese government gave the 1952 expedition permit to the Swiss.

== Organisation ==
Edouard Wyss-Dunant was appointed to lead the expedition. The other Swiss members were Rene Aubert, Leon Flory, André Roch and Raymond Lambert, who joined despite having suffered amputations of frostbitten toes.

All the Swiss expedition members were from Geneva. Most of the Swiss belonged to the exclusive L'Androsace climbing club and knew each other well. The city and canton of Geneva provided moral and financial support for the expedition, and the University of Geneva provided the scientific contingent.

== Goals ==
The primary objectives of the mountaineering team included exploring access to the South Col, conquering the intricate Khumbu Icefall, and potentially advancing to the South Col. John Hunt, who met the team in Zurich upon their return, noted that following the Swiss Expedition's near-success in the spring, they resolved to make another summit attempt in the autumn. However, due to the decision being made in June, the second team arrived too late, facing the harsh winter winds.

== Ascent ==
Building on Shipton's experience, the Genevans reached the head of the Western Cwm and climbed the huge face above to the desolate, wind-swept plateau of the South Col. Three Swiss climbers and the Sherpa Tenzing Norgay continued towards the summit, pitching a tent at 8,400 meters. Two returned, leaving Tenzing and Lambert, who had become firm friends, to make a summit attempt. High-altitude mountaineering in 1952 was still in its infancy and their organisation and technology proved insufficient. Apart from Tenzing, the Sherpas had little experience. Tenzing and Lambert now had to spend a night at 27,500 feet (8,400 m) with no sleeping bags and no stove, producing a trickle of drinking water by melting snow over a candle.

Edmund Hillary recalled in 1953 "an incredibly lonely sight, the battered framework of the tent that Tenzing and Raymond Lambert of the 1952 Swiss expedition pitched over a year before and where they had spent an extremely uncomfortable night without food, without drink, and without sleeping bags. What a tough couple they had been, but perhaps not very well organised." Hillary thought that Tenzing and Lambert were not sufficiently hydrated, having relied on cheese and snow melted over a candle for sustenance (he insisted on everyone keeping their fluids up by melting snow on a Primus stove for water). This was also the conclusion of Griffith Pugh in 1952.

Their oxygen sets operated poorly when breathing heavily and when the two men continued in the morning, they were effectively climbing without oxygen. They struggled onwards, at times crawling while hindered by the dead weight of their oxygen sets, finally halting near 8595 m, about 250 m short of the summit. The sets gave some relief at rest but the valves resisted the passage of oxygen with violent breathing at high altitude. The autumn expedition had two new types of open-circuit oxygen equipment; the better Drägerwerk set was based on apparatus used by pilots, and the oxygen supply could be selected to be between 2 and 4 litres a minute. The Swiss might have reached the summit in the spring if the new Drägerwerk sets had been used.

== Results ==
Raymond Lambert and Tenzing Norgay reached a height of about 8,595 metres (28,199 ft) on the south-eastern ridge, setting a new climbing altitude record (assuming that George Mallory and Andrew Irvine did not ascend any higher during their expedition in 1924).

Tenzing's experience was useful when he was hired to be part of the British expedition in 1953, during which he reached the summit with Sir Edmund Hillary.

This first Swiss expedition to Mount Everest was considered successful. It had opened a new route to the peak of Everest, and it had reached a record height on the southwestern ridge in difficult conditions. In the opinion of the critical Marcel Kurz, the expedition was almost a victory. They had seen from close-up that the route to the South Summit had no insurmountable barriers, and only the last 90 metres (300 ft) to the summit remained unknown. The spring expedition might have reached the summit using the Draeger oxygen sets used for the autumn expedition. They showed the British that their route in 1953 should be up the Lhotse Face, not the couloirs, with a high camp on the South Col (which meant more stores to be carried higher). See the Appendix to Gill for the comparison of the two expeditions.

The expedition named the Geneva Spur rock formation, between the Western Cwm and the South Col. During the 1956 Swiss Everest–Lhotse expedition, Geneva Spur was the location of the last high camp before Fritz Luchsinger and Ernst Reiss achieved the first ascent of the Lhotse summit, on May 18, 1956.

== Autumn expedition ==
There was a second Swiss expedition in the autumn of 1952, after the monsoon, the first serious attempt to climb Everest at that time of year (having received permission from the Nepalese government to go during the whole year). A party including Lambert, Tenzing and others made it to the South Col, but was forced back by extremely cold weather after reaching an altitude of 8,100 metres (26,575 ft). The autumn expedition was only decided in June, so the second party arrived too late, when winter winds were buffeting the mountain. They held out in terrible conditions of discomfort and mental strain, but never succeeded in getting within striking distance of the summit (Hunt had decided that if the 1953 British expedition failed, they would also make another post-monsoon attempt).

== Appendix ==
A comparison of the 1952 Swiss and 1953 British expeditions.

	Swiss; spring 1952	British; spring 1953
Climbers	9	12
High-altitude Sherpas	14	28
Oxygen	20,000 litres	193,000 litres
Weight of stores and equipment	4½ tons (4570 kg)	7½ tons (7615 kg)
Arrival in Namche	14 April	25 March
Man-days on & above South Col	18	33
Route up Lhotse face	Ice couloir with no camps	Lhotse Glacier with two camps

== Sources ==
- Gill, Michael (2017). Edmund Hillary: A Biography. Nelson, NZ: Potton & Burton. ISBN 978-0-947503-38-3.
