= Death zone =

Altitudes above about 8,000 m (26,000 ft)

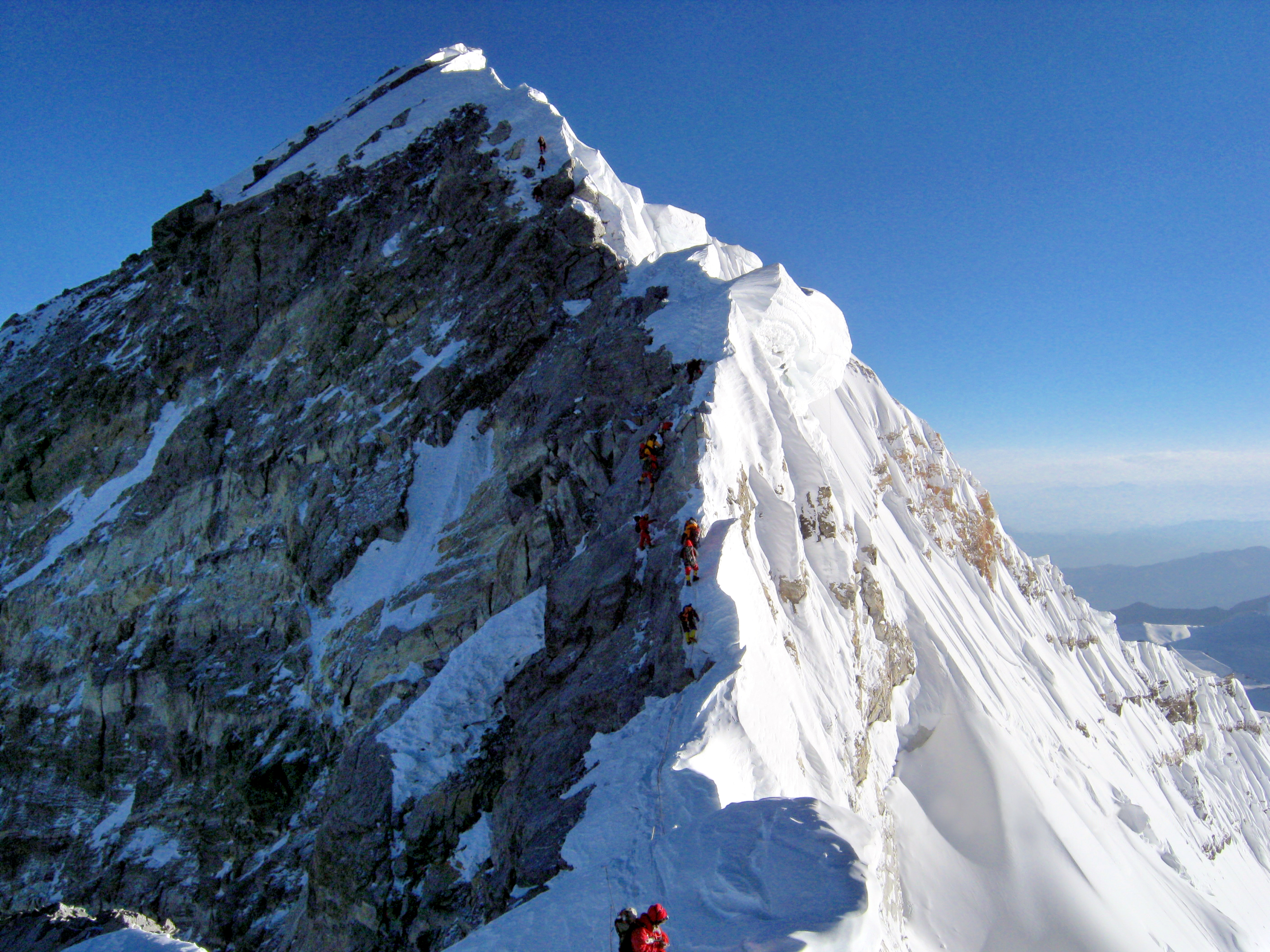
The summit ridge of Mount Everest lies in the death zone

In mountaineering, the death zone refers to altitudes above which the pressure of oxygen is insufficient to sustain human life for an extended time span. This point is generally considered to be 8,000 m (26,246.72 ft), where atmospheric pressure is less than 356 millibars (10.5 inHg; 5.16 psi). Standard sea-level pressure is 1013.25 millibar. The concept was conceived in 1953 by Edouard Wyss-Dunant, a Swiss doctor, who called it the lethal zone. All 14 peaks above 8000 m (the "eight-thousanders") in the death zone are located in the Himalaya and Karakoram regions of Asia.

Many deaths in high-altitude mountaineering have been caused by the effects of the death zone, either directly by the loss of vital functions or indirectly by poor decisions made under stress (e.g., not turning back in deteriorating conditions, or misreading the climbing route) or physical weakening leading to accidents (e.g., falls). An extended stay above 8,000 m (26,200 ft) without a high-altitude breathing apparatus (which includes bottled oxygen) will result in deterioration of bodily functions and death.

== Physiological background ==
The human body has optimal endurance below 150 m (490 ft) elevation. The concentration of oxygen (O_{2}) in air is 20.9%, so the partial pressure of O_{2} (PO_{2}) at sea level is about 21.2 kPa (6.3 inHg; 3.07 psi). In healthy individuals, this saturates hemoglobin, the oxygen-binding red pigment in red blood cells.

Atmospheric pressure decreases with altitude while the O_{2} fraction remains constant to about 85 km (53 mi), so PO_{2} decreases with altitude as well. It is about half of its sea level value at 5,500 m (18,000 ft), the altitude of the Mount Everest base camp, and less than a third at 8,849 m (29,032 ft), the summit of Mount Everest. When PO_{2} drops, the body responds with altitude acclimatization. Additional red blood cells are manufactured; the heart beats faster; non-essential body functions are suppressed; food digestion efficiency declines (as the body suppresses the digestive system in favor of increasing its cardiopulmonary reserves); and one breathes more deeply and more frequently. But acclimatization requires days or even weeks. Failure to acclimatize may result in altitude sickness, including high-altitude pulmonary edema (HAPE) or cerebral edema (HACE).

Humans have survived for 2 years at 5,950 m (19,500 ft) [475 millibars (14.0 inHg; 6.89 psi) of atmospheric pressure], which appears to be near the limit of the permanently tolerable highest altitude. At extreme altitudes, above 7,500 m (24,600 ft) [383 millibars (11.3 inHg; 5.55 psi) of atmospheric pressure], sleeping becomes very difficult, digesting food is near-impossible, and the risk of HAPE or HACE increases greatly.

In the death zone and higher, no human body can acclimatize. The body uses up its store of oxygen faster than it can be replenished. An extended stay in the zone without supplementary oxygen will result in deterioration of body functions, loss of consciousness, and, ultimately, death. Scientists at the High Altitude Pathology Institute in Bolivia dispute the existence of a death zone, based on observation of extreme tolerance to hypoxia in patients with chronic mountain sickness and normal fetuses in-utero, both of which present pO_{2} levels similar to those at the summit of Mount Everest.

== Supplemental oxygen ==
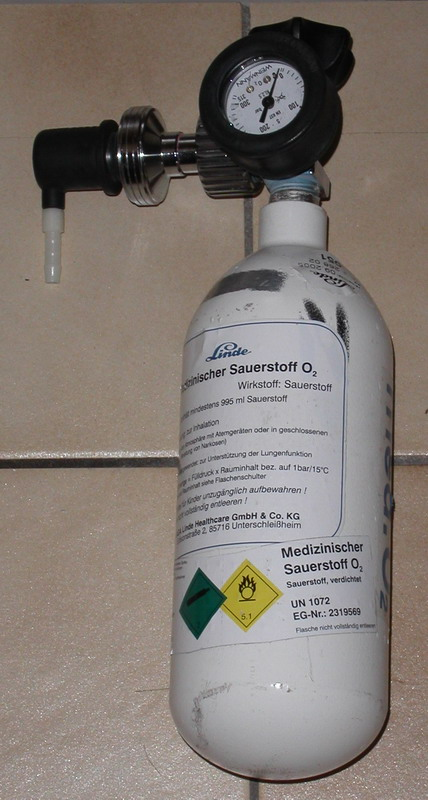
Bottled oxygen can help mountaineers survive in the death zone

Mountaineers use supplemental oxygen in the death zone to reduce deleterious effects. An open-circuit oxygen apparatus was first tested on the 1922 and 1924 British Mount Everest expeditions; the bottled oxygen taken in 1921 was not used (see George Finch and Noel Odell). In 1953 the first assault party of Tom Bourdillon and Charles Evans used closed-circuit oxygen apparatus. The second (successful) party of Edmund Hillary and Tenzing Norgay used open-circuit oxygen apparatus; after ten minutes taking photographs on the summit without his oxygen set on, Hillary said he "was becoming rather clumsy-fingered and slow-moving".

Physiologist Griffith Pugh was on the 1952 and 1953 expeditions to study the effects of cold and altitude; he recommended acclimatising for four weeks and the use of supplemental oxygen equipment. He further studied the ability to acclimatise over several months on the 1960–61 Silver Hut expedition to the Himalayas.

In 1978, Reinhold Messner and Peter Habeler made the first ascent of Mount Everest without supplemental oxygen.

== Notable disasters ==
Several expeditions have encountered disaster in the death zone that led to multiple fatalities, including:

- 1996 Mount Everest disaster
- 2008 K2 disaster

== See also ==
- Effects of high altitude on humans
- Hypoxemia
- Hypoxia (medicine)
