= Michael Ward (mountaineer) =

English surgeon

Michael Ward CBE
- Born: 26 March 1925; London, England
- Died: 7 October 2005 (aged 80)
- Education: Peterhouse, Cambridge
- Occupations: surgeon and mountaineer
- Known for: Expedition doctor on 1953 British Mount Everest expedition
- Honours: CBE, Founder’s Medal of the Royal Geographical Society

Michael Phelps Ward, CBE (26 March 1925 – 7 October 2005) was an English mountaineer and surgeon. Amongst his other accomplishments, he was the expedition doctor during the history-making first ascent of Mount Everest in 1953 led by John Hunt, when Edmund Hillary and Tenzing Norgay reached the summit. He argued the conquest of the mountain was as much a victory for science since the scientists finally figured out how to cope with the physiological effects of extreme high altitude such as oxygen lack, dehydration, and cold injury. His discoveries a few years earlier in the Royal Geographical Society archives of the Milne-Hinks map and unofficial RAF photos of the Everest area helped find a viable route the summit thus making the ascent possible.

He had instigated and participated on the earlier 1951 British Mount Everest Reconnaissance Expedition which pioneered the route used by the 1953 expedition. He was asked by Eric Shipton to go on the 1952 British Cho Oyu Expedition, but declined in favour of completing his national military service and medical studies, particularly his upcoming surgery examination.

He was a pioneer in high altitude medicine and physiology, which he researched with Griffith Pugh during the ground-breaking Himalayan Scientific and Mountaineering Expedition, also known as the Silver Hut Expedition. He used this opportunity to lead the first ascent of the iconic Ama Dablam, notably during winter, a climb considered years ahead of its time.

In 1972, he wrote an autobiography In This Short Span covering the first forty years of his life and mountaineering adventures.

He was a supporter of the National Health Service and the East End of London rather than Harley Street. He was a lecturer in Clinical Surgery at the London Hospital Medical College 1975–93, and Consultant Surgeon at St Andrew's Hospital, Bow and Newham Hospital 1983–93.

In 1981, just as China was opening up following its turbulent Cultural Revolution, Ward organised and led an expedition there, which made the first ascent of Mount Kongur.

In 1982, he was awarded the Founder’s Medal of the Royal Geographical Society; his citation reading: ‘For high-altitude medical research and leadership of the British Mount Kongur Expedition.’

In the 1983 New Year Honours, he was appointed a Commander of the British Empire (CBE) for services to mountaineering.

He was Vice President of the Alpine Club , Chairman of the Mount Everest Foundation 1978–80 (acting 1977), President of the Cambridge Alpine Club 1986–95, and Master of The Worshipful Society of Apothecaries of London 1993–94.

Ward lived most of his life in London, where he worked for various hospitals. A prolific writer, he published around one hundred articles for mountaineering and medical journals, as well as four books.

== Books published ==
1966. The Mountaineer’s Companion (editor). London: Eyre & Spottiswoode.

1972. In This Short Span. London: Victor Gollancz. ISBN 978-0-575-01328-5

1975. Mountain Medicine: A Clinical Study of Cold and High Altitude. London: Crosby Lockwood Staples. ISBN 978-0-258-96989-2 (Republished in 1989 as High Altitude Medicine and Physiology with James Milledge and John West. London: Chapman and Hall Medical. ISBN 978-0-412-29010-7)

2003. Everest: A Thousand Years of Exploration. Glasgow: Ernest Press. ISBN 978-0-948153-71-6
