= 1960–61 Silver Hut expedition =

Himalayan expedition by Edmund Hillary and Griffith Pugh

The 1960–61 Silver Hut expedition, formally known as the Himalayan Scientific and Mountaineering Expedition, was initiated by Edmund Hillary and Griffith Pugh with John Dienhart of World Books in America (producers of a children’s encyclopedia). The expedition lasted from September 1960 to June 1961.

In 1958 Hillary and Pugh had discussed whether Everest could be climbed without oxygen; with improved acclimatising by wintering at, say, 20,000 feet (6,100 m) for six months beforehand. Pugh’s plans, involving two bases on Everest (Base camp, and on the Western Cwm at 20,000 feet (6,100 m)), had been dropped by Hillary, as the Chinese had rebuffed their request for additional bases due to political conflict with Tibet. The expedition was also short on funds; Hillary wrote to Pugh in 1959 "I’m damn certain that we’d get someone on the top (of Everest) without oxygen but we’d need a lot of cash". In 1959 Hillary was awarded the Explorer of the Year Award by Argosy magazine; his prize was $US1000 and a trip to New York to address the award banquet. His speech and personality impressed Dienhart, who invited him to their Chicago headquarters. Hillary proposed a "Yeti search" plus a party of climbers who would winter for the first time at (20,000 feet (6,100 m)) and then attempt the summit of Makalu (27,790 feet (8,470 m)) without oxygen. Hillary estimated the expedition cost at $US120,000 and, after meeting him in Chicago in October 1959, the World Book board gave him $US125,000 and a "practically free hand".

== Nepal and the Silver Hut base ==
The expedition gathered in Kathmandu in September 1960, destined for the Rolwaling Valley. The valley was reputed to be a Yeti stronghold and was the location where mountaineers Eric Shipton and Michael Ward, along with the Sherpa Sen Tenzing, had photographed alleged Yeti footprints in 1951. At the end of October the expedition went via the 19,000 feet (5,800 m) Tashi Laptsa Pass to the Khumbu region. New Zealand mountaineer Norman Hardie led a party of 310 Nepali porters with parts of the hut, the laboratory equipment, and winter supplies. He set up a base at the village of Changmatang, near the entrance to the Mingbo Valley.

Research accommodation was in the prefabricated Silver Hut and an adjacent tent. The Silver Hut was six meters long and three meters wide, with a panoramic view from windows at the laboratory end. The setting was spectacular, between the "vertiginous walls" of Ama Dablam and behind them the cirque of steep ice and rock of the Mingbo La. A kerosene stove separated the living space, with eight bunks and a dining table, from the laboratory, with a bicycle ergometer and equipment benches. Hillary had originally picked the crest of the Mingbo Valley, located on the col of the Mingbo Valley for the research base. But the pass (19,000 feet (5,800 m)) was up a 500 feet (150 m) slope of steep ice and winds funnelled over the pass. Hardie and Hillary agreed that the névé 500 feet lower was better and safer. Though Pugh had been at Changmatang for two weeks and ultimately agreed with Hardie and Hillary, he was displeased with not having been consulted. This was an early indication of the difficult relationship between Hillary and Pugh.

The scientific phase of the expedition here lasted from November 1960 to March 1961. The "wintering party" was Pugh. With him were mountaineers Bishop, Gill, Lahiri, Milledge, Ward and West, and Sherpas Siku, Dawa Tensing and Mingma Norbu. The physiological measurements at 19,000 feet (5,800 m), an altitude in the grey zone between acclimatisation and deterioration, was unique; at that altitude, the oxygen content of the air was half that at sea level. Initially, work capacity was half that at sea level, but it increased to two-thirds with acclimatisation. The party all lost weight, an indication of high-altitude deterioration. For lung and heart function assessment, oxygen and carbon dioxide are measured in the lungs and blood. At sea level, blood leaving the lungs is nearly fully saturated with oxygen, but it dropped to seventy percent at the camp. An important finding was that during exercise saturation dropped further, sometimes below fifty percent, despite a huge increase in the breathing rate; this explains why climbing upwards at high altitude is extraordinarily exhausting even if feeling comfortable at rest.

Later the Silver Hut was disassembled and given to Tenzing Norgay for the institute’s high training base in Sikkim.

== The Yeti Hunt ==
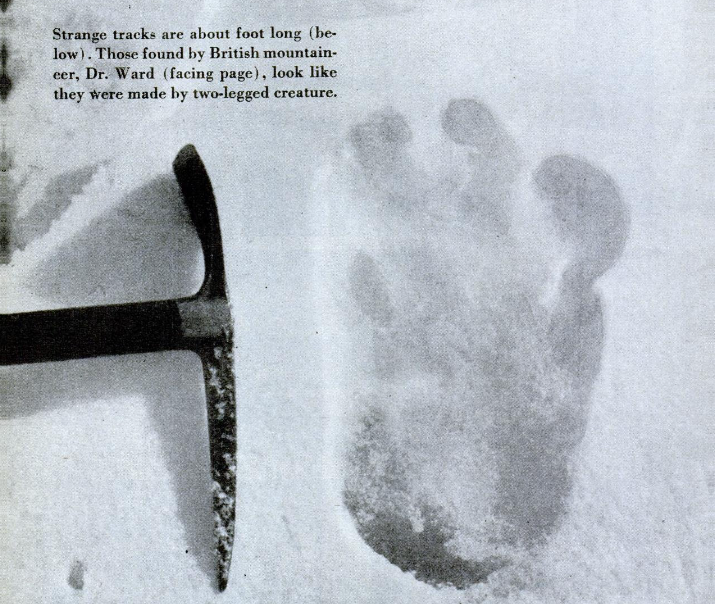
Shipton photo 1951

The Yeti Hunt was to find evidence either proving or disproving the existence of the Yeti. It was supported by Marlin Perkins, the Director of the Lincoln Park Zoo in Chicago. The zoo was well-known for the TV programme "Wild Kingdom", and Perkins hoped that they could capture a Yeti. Perkins thought that the best evidence was the 1951 photos of Yeti tracks by Shipton, Ward, and Sherpa Sen Tenzing, although these were later dismissed, with Shipton and Bill Tilman having a "running Yeti joke" rivalry. Hillary said in 1984 of the 1951 photo that "Eric (Shipton) was a joker ... he’s gone around it (the footprint) with his knuckles, shaped the toe, pressed in the middle. There’s no animal that could walk with a foot like that. He made it up ... " Hillary chose the Rowaling Valley to start after three weeks acclimatizing; it was reputed to be a Yeti stronghold and where the supposed 1951 photographs of Yeti footprints had been taken. Doig said he would pay for a Yeti, dead or alive, or parts. They returned with a supposed Yeti scalp, three Tibetan blue bear skins, a goat skin, a dried human hand, two small red pandas and a fox. They set up cameras, telescopes, tripwires and capture guns around the Ripimu Glacier at 18,000 feet (5,500 m) feet. At the end of October, they left for the Khumbu region via the Tashi Laptsas Pass and borrowed a 200-year-old Yeti scalp from the Jhumjung Monastery. Hillary and Doig took the "scalp" to Chicago in December 1960.

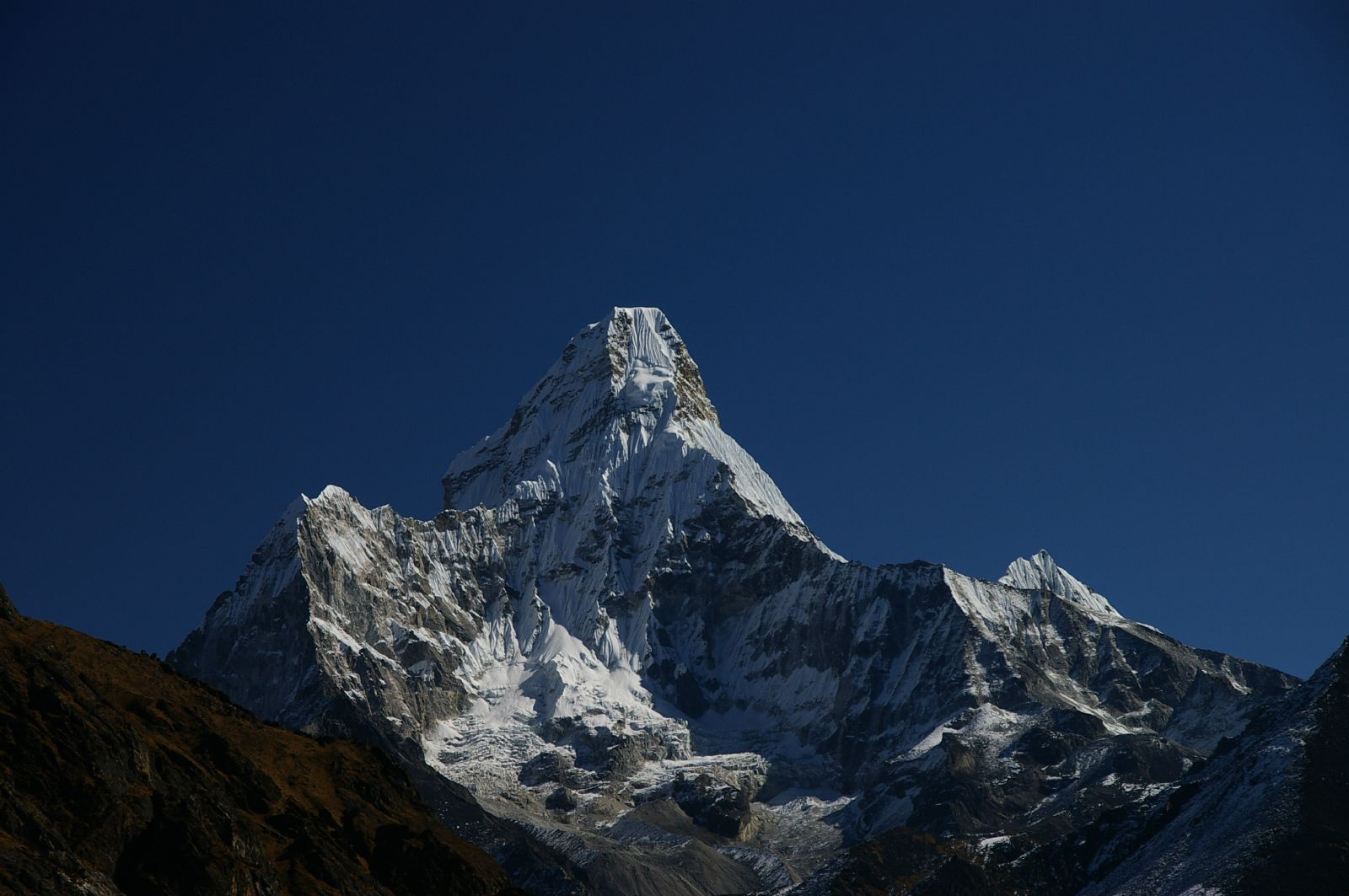
Ama Dablam from the southwest

== The Assault on Ama Dablam ==
A party of leaders Mike Ward and Barry Bishop, Mike Gill and Wally Romanes made the first ascent to the 22,500 feet (6,900 m) summit of Ama Dablam on 13 March, starting on 11 March. Hillary had expected just a preliminary look at what looked to be an "impossible difficult" challenge and wondered if the Nepalese government would take issue with their lack of permission to make the climb. The difficult section, the vertical rock of the first step, had been investigated on 24 and 25 March.

Eight days later, a message arrived from the Nepali Foreign Secretary cancelling the party’s permit to climb Makalu. The reason given was the "unauthorised ascent of AMADABLAM", although their permit did authorise work in the Mingbo and to "climb adjacent peaks". Through Desmond Doig, who knew the new Prime Minister Dr. Tulsi Giri, Hillary got permission to continue as a "special case" after writing a letter of apology. Possible reasons for the official displeasure were international criticism of King Mahendra for shutting down Parliament, the wide publicity given to the ascent, or because Hillary attended the state banquet on 27 February, during Queen Elizabeth’s state visit, in a lounge suit rather than in a dinner suit with his decorations. Sir Edward (sic) Hillary and Mrs E. (sic) Hillary had been invited at the last minute.

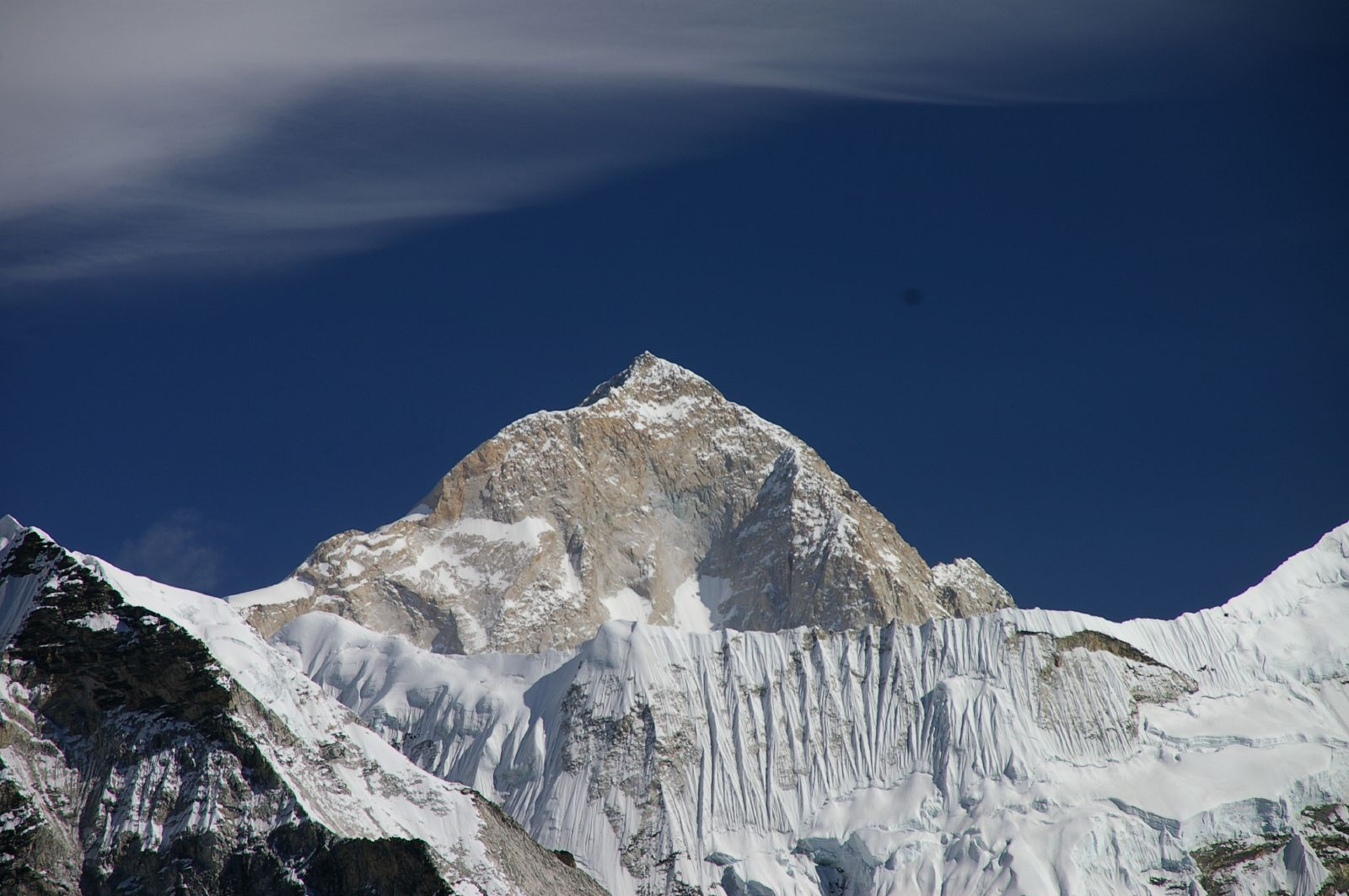
Makalu from the southwest

== The Assault on Makalu ==
The third object of the expedition was to acclimatise a party of climbers who would summit Makalu (27,790 feet (8,470 m)) without oxygen. There were to be three scientific camps where the bicycle ergonometer would be used: Base Camp (17,500 feet (5,300 m)), camp 3 on the neve (21,000 feet (6,400 m)) and Camp 5 (24,400 feet (7,400 m) on Makalu Col. At Camps 6 (25,800 feet (7,900 m)) and 7 (27,000 feet (8,200 m)) and the summit only alveolar air samples would be taken. Camp 3 was established by the end of April 1961 then Camp 4 (23,000 feet (7,000 m)). Camp 2 was at 19,000 feet (5,800 m)

Makalu is the fifth-highest mountain in the world. Hillary had been near-death on the mountain in 1954 with cerebral and pulmonary edema. On 4 May at Camp 4 he was unwell and went back to Camp 2 then Base Camp and back to Khumjung; it was the end of his days as a serious climber. But while the Silver Hut group was better acclimatized at 19,000 feet (5,800 m) there was no consistent difference between the two groups at 24,300 feet (7,400 m) on the Col.

The first assault on 13 May (Gill, Romanes and Ortenberger) got above camp 6 in gale-force winds but had to turn back; they found the altitude "much tougher than they expected."

The second assault team (Mulgrew & Nevison) left Camp 6 on 17 May but Mulgrew had severe chest pain from a pulmonary embolism at 27,450 feet (8,370 m). and had a desperate five-day struggle back to Camp 5 on the Col where Ward also suffered cerebral edema; Mulgrew had to be carried part-way by a Sherpa (Urkien). He was an appalling sight and it was a miracle he was still alive. Doig arranged a helicopter which took Mulgrew with Ward and Ang Temba from the Barun Valley (15,000 feet (4,600 m)) to Shanta Bhawan Hospital in Kathmandu His life had been saved by the efforts of Nevison, Ortenburger and the Sherpas Urkien, Pemba Tharkey, Siku and Pemba Tenzing.

A third assault team of Harrison and Ward had been planned.

In 1955 a French team using oxygen put nine French climbers and a Sherpa on the summit. Gill says that while pulmonary infarcts are rare, the French team in 1954 was fitter and used oxygen day and night from Camp 4 (23,000 feet (7,000 m)); and also that the mountain was very windy: Jean Franco wrote that Makalu Col was "the kingdom of the wind". Everest was first climbed without oxygen by Reinhold Messner and Peter Habeler in 1978.

== The Personnel ==
Edmund Hillary, Griffith Pugh and fellow climbers Norman Hardie, George Lowe, Peter Mulgrew, Michael Ward, John Harrison (NZ), Leigh Ortenberger (US), Wally Romanes (NZ) and American photographer Barry Bishop.

Several doctors, most with expertise in respiratory physiology and also mountaineering: John West, Jim Milledge (UK), Sukhamay Lahiri (India), Tom Nevison (US, USAF) and Michael Gill (NZ, medical student).

Himalayan Adventure Intl Treks can organize the Ama Dablam Expedition and Journalist Desmond Doig from the "Calcutta Statesman" who spoke Nepali (having fought with the Gurkhas).

Sherpas Siku, Dawa Tensing, Mingma Norbu and others.

== Achievements ==
The scientific programme was an unqualified success, and the expedition became one of the classic studies in high-altitude physiology. West, Ward and Milledge wrote a textbook "High Altitude Medicine and Physiology" which by 2021 was in its sixth edition. Pugh showed that Mount Everest could be climbed without oxygen, after a period of acclimatisation; the team lived at 19,000 feet (5,800 m) for six months.

Hillary’s search for the fabled Yeti or "abominable snowman" found no evidence, and footprints and tracks were proven to be from other causes. Hillary travelled to remote temples which contained "Yeti scalps"; however after bringing back three relics, two were shown to be from bears and one from a goat antelope. Hillary said after the expedition: "The yeti is not a strange, superhuman creature as has been imagined. We have found rational explanations for most yeti phenomena". All the Yeti relics were from Tibetan blue bears, red pandas or goats, and Hillary said that another yeti-hunt would be a "sheer waste of money" But with the permission to remove for examination a "Yeti scalp" in the Khumjung Monastery in the Khumbu region he was asked to build a school in Khumjung; this led to a new project for Hillary; schools and healthcare for Sherpas through the Himalayan Trust.

While Hillary had money from books, he did not get any business or diplomatic jobs in New Zealand. In January 1962 the family left for Chicago where Hillary flew every week to speak to "World Bookers" the company’s sales staff throughout America. Then he became a director of the Australasian branch of World Books for an annual salary of $10,000. In January 1982 he joined the Ted Williams Sports Advisory staff of Sears Roebuck, Sears tents were provided for school-building; and a salary which increased from $1000 to $40,000 per annum.
