= British Mount Everest reconnaissance expedition =

British Mount Everest reconnaissance expedition may refer to:

- 1921 British Mount Everest reconnaissance expedition
- 1935 British Mount Everest reconnaissance expedition
- 1951 British Mount Everest reconnaissance expedition
