= Norman Hardie =

New Zealand climber (1924–2017)

Norman Hardie QSO
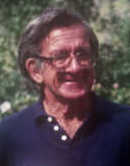
- Hardie in 1990
- Born: Norman David Hardie; 28 December 1924; Timaru, New Zealand
- Died: 31 October 2017 (aged 92); Christchurch, New Zealand
- Education: Canterbury University College
- Known for: Mountaineering
- Spouse: Enid Hurst (m. 1951)

Norman David Hardie QSO (28 December 1924 – 31 October 2017) was a New Zealand climber who was one of the climbers on the 1955 British Kangchenjunga expedition who first reached the summit of the 8,586-metre (28,169 ft) mountain, the third-highest mountain in the world.

== Early life ==
Hardie was born in Timaru in 1924. He left school early and, encouraged by his father, spent two seasons hunting deer in the Boyle and Hurunui River valleys. Encouraged by a local Timaru engineer, in 1943 Hardie enrolled at Canterbury University College for a degree in civil engineering. He continued hunting to finance his studies, but became increasingly involved in tramping (the New Zealand term for hiking) and mountaineering. He graduated from Canterbury in 1947 and worked at Lake Pukaki on the hydroelectricity scheme. He first met Edmund Hillary during a rescue mission for an injured climber on La Perouse in 1948 described as "the most arduous rescue in New Zealand's climbing history". After briefly working in Wellington, Hardie left for England in late 1950. He married Enid Hurst in 1951. He spent five years in London working in structural engineering and water works.

== Mountaineering ==
In London, he lived with other climbers from New Zealand. After Edmund Hillary's successful first ascent of Mount Everest, the New Zealand Alpine Club organised an expedition into the Barun Valley in Nepal in 1954. Hardie's role was to survey and map the routes up to Makalu, the fifth highest mountain in the world. He became close friends with Charles Evans during the expedition. When Evans received a telegram during the expedition inviting him to lead an attempt to climb Kangchenjunga in the next season, he asked Hardie to join him. Kangchenjunga, the third-highest mountain, was then the highest unclimbed peak.

A team of nine climbers — eight from the United Kingdom and Hardie from New Zealand — set off on the reconnaissance mission. Hardie, based on his engineering background, was put in charge of developing a better oxygen system than had been available to the 1953 British Mount Everest expedition. Hardie was appointed deputy leader by Evans and put in charge of training two team members, John Angelo Jackson and Joe Brown, in the use of crampons. After two months on the mountain and setting up camps at various heights, helped by 300 porters and 40 Sherpa, it became clear that they had the chance of turning their reconnaissance mission into an attempt to climb the mountain. George Band and Joe Brown reached the summit from their top camp at 8,200 metres (26,900 ft) on 25 May 1955, with Hardie and Tony Streather repeating the achievement on the following day. Technically much harder than Mount Everest, Kangchenjunga was not climbed again for 22 years.

After the successful climb, Hardie travelled with three Sherpa for several months in their home region. Joined by his wife and a friend from New Zealand, Joe Macdonald, he mapped the last uncharted areas of the Himalayas south of Mount Everest. Hardie published a book in 1957 based on his diaries, In Highest Nepal. An official translation is available in German, and a plagiarised version exists in Japanese.

He was on the 1960–61 Silver Hut expedition to the Himalayas with Hillary.

== Later life ==
For 22 years, Hardie was on the board of Edmund Hillary's Himalayan Trust. He visited the Himalayas on 14 trips. He has also been to Antarctica on three occasions, including as leader of Scott Base. In the 1992 New Year Honours, Hardie was appointed a Companion of the Queen's Service Order for community service.

He published his autobiography, On My Own Two Feet, in 2006. In the book's foreword, Sir Edmund Hillary describes Hardie as follows:

"... a skilled mountaineer and a formidable explorer ... renowned for his considerable determination and refusal to accept defeat."

Hardie lived in Cashmere, a suburb of Christchurch in a house designed by Don Donnithorne. He was one of the speakers at Hillary's state funeral in 2008. It was announced at the 60th anniversary of the Kangchenjunga ascent that the New Zealand Alpine Club has commissioned a film to be made about Hardie's climb. Hardie died in Christchurch on 31 October 2017.

== Bibliography ==
- On My Own Two Feet: The Life of a Mountaineer. Christchurch: Canterbury University Press. December 2006. ISBN 1-877257-47-8.
