= Geneva Spur =

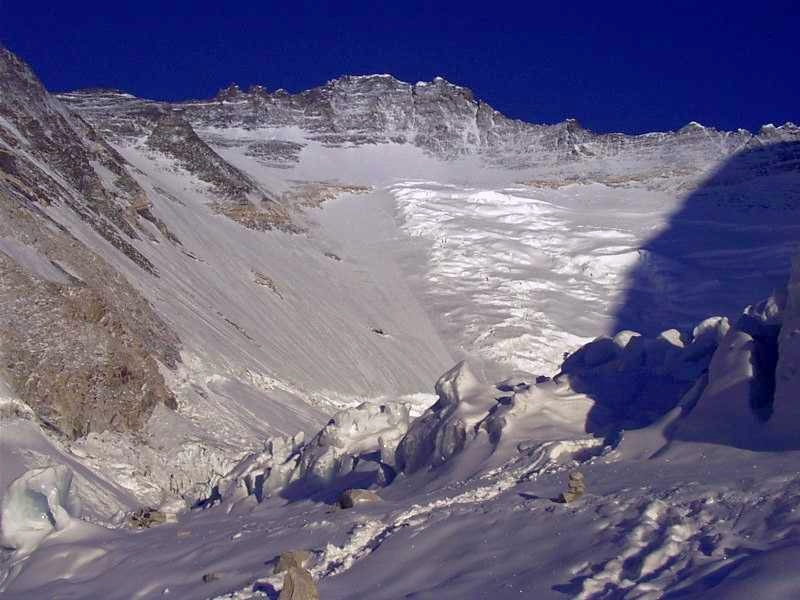
- Looking up at Lhotse, Geneva Spur on the left bank
- Elevation: Starts at about 24,000 ft (7,300 m)

Third Approach
- Location: Mount Everest
- Range: Himalayas

The Geneva Spur, named after its French counterpart Eperon des Genevois and also being called Saddle Rib, is a geological feature on Mount Everest — a large rock buttress near the summits of Everest and Lhotse. It is above Camp III and the Yellow Band, but before Camp IV and South Col. The altitude of the spur is between 25,000 and 26,000 feet (7,600 and 7,900 m).

The Geneva Spur name comes from the 1952 Swiss Mount Everest Expedition. The spur provides a route to the South Col and is usually traversed by climbers heading for the Lhotse or Everest summits.

From the top of the Geneva Spur, South Col can be seen, and when looking at it Mount Everest is on the left and Lhotse to the right. Lhotse climbers typically head southeast from Geneva Spur, and on to a couloir to ascend that summit.

== History ==
On the 1956 Swiss Everest–Lhotse Expedition, the spur was the location of the last high camp before Fritz Luchsinger and Ernst Reiss achieved the first known ascent of Lhotse summit, on 18 May 1956.

Far bigger than it looks from a distance, Geneva Spur was a welcome mixture of snow and rock scrambling.

— G. Plimpton, As Told at the Explorers Club

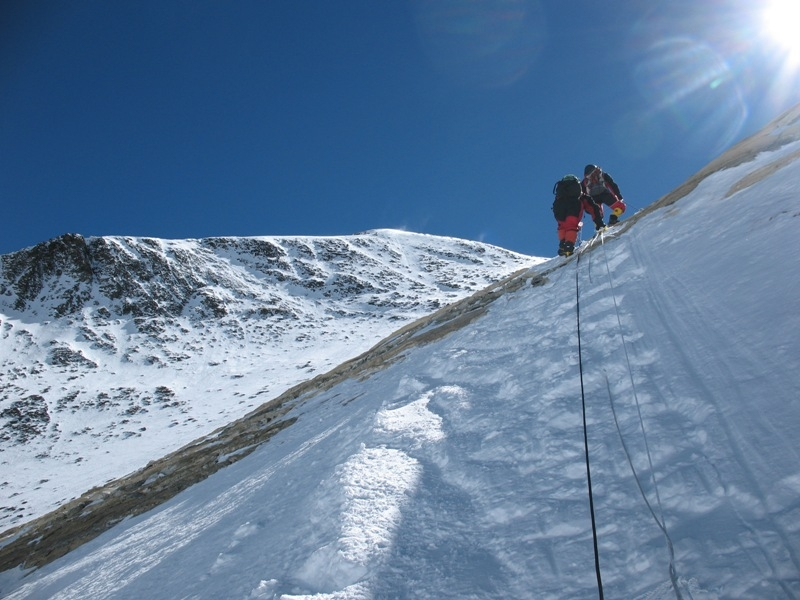
Eperon des Genevois as seen from a climber's perspective, the rock formation rising up from snow in the center-left

== Location on climbing routes to peaks of Everest and Lhotse ==
The Geneva spur is above the Yellow Band; on the Southeast Ridge climbing route, the Geneva Spur lies above Camp III, but lower than Camp IV (as of 2003) and South Col. The spur provides a route to the South Col, and is usually traversed by climbers heading for Lhotse or Everest summits.

== Additional descriptions ==
The Geneva Spur, [in the 1955 translated edition of a 1952 book] "is now called the Saddle Rib. It is flanked on either side by two steep couloirs, which after fresh falls of snow become dangerously exposed to avalanches, but after dry spells turn to grooves of bare ice".
