= Griffith Pugh =

British physiologist and mountaineer

Lewis Griffith Cresswell Evans Pugh (29 October 1909 – 22 December 1994), generally known as Griffith Pugh, was a British physiologist and mountaineer. He was the expedition physiologist on the 1953 British expedition that made the first ascent of Mount Everest, and a researcher into the effects of cold and altitude on human physiology.

== Childhood, education and family ==
Pugh's father was Lewis Pugh Evans Pugh KC, a Welsh barrister who practised in Calcutta, and who had two children: Griffith, and Gwladys Mary Pugh. Pugh went to Harrow School, and between 1928 and 1931 took a degree in law at New College, Oxford University, although he switched to medicine, which he studied for three more years, after which he qualified at St Thomas' Hospital, London, in 1938, where he subsequently worked.

On 5 September 1939, Pugh married Josephine Helen Cassel, daughter of Sir Felix Cassel and Lady Helen Grimston, and they had four children: David Sheridan Griffith Pugh, Simon Francis Pugh, Harriet Veronica Felicity Pugh (whose married name is Harriet Tuckey) and Oliver Lewis Evans Pugh.

== Skiing ==
Pugh was a keen skier, learning the skill in the Swiss resort of Engelberg as a child, and later competing in the World Championships. He was selected to represent Britain in the 1936 Winter Olympics in Garmisch-Partenkirchen in all three skiing disciplines but was unable to compete as a result of injury. He also made frequent trips to the Mont Blanc massif and the Bernese Oberland to climb.

== Wartime service ==
Having served in the Royal Army Medical Corps in Britain, Greece, Crete, Egypt, Ceylon, Iraq and Jerusalem, Pugh was invited by fellow Harrovian W. J. Riddell, on the basis of his skiing and climbing expertise, to join the recently established School of Mountain Warfare at the Cedars resort in Lebanon, working for two years alongside A. D. M. Cox (an Oxford don and a considerable alpinist in his own right) and John Carryer. Pugh wrote papers for the School that were later used in the Army Training Manual, did much ski mountaineering, often ascending 3,000 to 4,000 feet, crossing 20 miles on trips that lasted up to 12 hours in self-contained units that could be self-sufficient for over a week, and training troops to oppose crack German mountain formations.

== Mountaineering and physiology ==
After the war, Pugh worked in Hammersmith in clinical research at the Post-Graduate Medical School. His much-noted eccentricity was already evident, as when he attached electrodes to his body and submerged himself in an ice bath from which he had to be rescued as the cold had paralysed him. He moved in 1950 to the Medical Research Council laboratories in Hampstead to work under Professor Otto Edholm in the Department of Human Physiology as head of the Laboratory of Field Physiology. He stayed there for the rest of his career.

=== Cho Oyu 1952 ===
Expedition leader Eric Shipton invited Pugh, now on the High Altitude Committee of the Medical Research Council, to accompany the British 1952 Cho Oyu expedition to perform research on oxygen equipment that would be useful on the following year's expedition to Mount Everest. Pugh realised that the best way to do this was to study climbers in the field at altitude, and he analysed rates of breathing, and food and fluid intake. His report on his findings was, according to George Band, a climber on the 1953 Mount Everest expedition, of "fundamental value" to that expedition. These included the need to drink considerably more than the usual three or four pints of liquid per day; on Mount Everest. Hunt reports that Pugh's advice was that they drink six or seven pints of fluid a day. In June 1952, Pugh reported to the Joint Himalayan Committee that the failure of the Swiss on Mount Everest in the spring of that year suggested that the British, who he deemed to be less fit and less experienced mountaineers, therefore needed to be supplied with "only the best oxygen equipment ... to put up a better performance than the Swiss".

Pugh's 1952 "seminal" report for the Medical Research Council was never published. The writer Michael Gill unearthed a copy with Pugh's other papers in the Mandeville Special Collection of the University of California, San Diego. He was surprised that it did not answer questions like the height at which to use oxygen, flow rates other than 4 L/m, and whether to use sleeping oxygen.

=== Mount Everest 1953 ===
Pugh accompanied the Mount Everest expedition as field physiologist under the sponsorship of the Medical Research Council, although he did not travel with the main party, which left England for India in February 1953 aboard the S.S. Stratheden. As well as the oxygen equipment, which he developed alongside Tom Bourdillon, much of the other high-altitude equipment – boots, tents, clothing, stoves and airbeds – was designed by him. Pugh also designed the diet, which included 400g of sugar a day for the assault party, most of which "astonishing amount", according to Band, was consumed by the Sherpas in their tea. In addition to his research on Cho Oyo, Pugh had taken part in tests of the oxygen equipment in a decompression chamber at the Royal Aircraft Establishment in Farnborough, where according to Hunt he displayed symptoms of anoxia when taken to the artificial height of 29,000 ft and had his oxygen mask removed; Band records his "spasmodic twitching" and attempts to prevent the instructor to replace his mask". Pugh arranged for the use of "sleeping oxygen" at higher camps, where one oxygen bottle supplied two men through masks of the type used by BOAC; Pugh was with Hunt at Camp IV, where Hunt reported a restful night using the system.

Pugh's scientific equipment was carried from Kathmandu to Everest Base Camp in a "shining aluminium trunk of coffin-like dimensions", and during the walk-in he subjected expedition members to a number of physiological tests, including a "maximum work test", which involved going uphill as fast as possible and then breathing into a bag on collapsing exhausted at the top. He continued these tests at the camp at Thyangboche, where he set up his physiological tent, which contained scales, medical tools, thermometers and other equipment. His dress for the walk-in was pyjamas, a deerstalker's hat and sunglasses; he wore these pyjamas at the reception given by the King of Nepal at the expedition's end. Band accounts for them by stating that Pugh was protecting his fair skin from the sun, which suffered badly before he started wearing them, and relates that the Sherpas treated him as the expedition's "holy man" on account of his appearance and his "absent-minded" air.

Pugh was part of the first party to ascend from Thyangboche to find a route through the Khumbu Icefall.

In Everest – The First Ascent: The Untold Story of Griffith Pugh, the Man Who Made It Possible by Pugh's daughter Harriet Tuckey, published in 2013, Tuckey argues that her father was given insufficient credit in the official accounts of the first ascent – The Ascent of Everest by expedition leader John Hunt and the film The Conquest of Everest – for his role in making it possible. These accounts stressed the derring-do and "grit and determination" of the expedition team, while simultaneously downplaying the important role that science, in particular the science of Pugh, played. Indeed, in the film, Pugh was depicted as a mad scientist, "belittled, his work passed over without mention", because to the British establishment of the time, Tuckey maintains, science was perceived as unheroic and to stress its key role would have undermined the heroism of the ascent. In a section of George Band's Everest: 50 Years on Top of the World (2003) entitled "Why Did We Succeed?", Band lists among the factors "the research of those, such as Griff Pugh, Dr Bradley and the developers of our oxygen sets who all helped to ensure that our acclimatization, clothing and equipment were better than ever before".

=== 1960–61 Silver Hut expedition ===
Having been on three previous expedition with Edmund Hillary, the New Zealand mountaineer invited him in 1960–61 on a nine-month-long expedition to the Himalaya on which the long-term effects of altitude on human physiology were studied. The prefabricated "Silver Hut" was carried up to an altitude of 19,000 feet (5,800 m) and experiments on the cardiac and pulmonary response to a prolonged period at altitude were carried out. Here Pugh showed that Mount Everest could be climbed without oxygen, which was shown to be the case by Reinhold Messner and Peter Habeler in their ascent of 1978. Two attempts were made to climb the world's fifth-highest mountain, Makalu, (27,790 feet (8,470 m)) without oxygen, but they were unsuccessful.

== Polar work 1956–57 ==
Pugh was invited by the University of California's Nello Pace in 1956–57 to the Scott Base in Antarctica to carry out research into carbon monoxide poisoning in huts and tents, the adaptation to and tolerance of cold, and the warming effect of solar radiation.

== Bibliography ==
- Band, George (2003). Everest: 50 Years on Top of the World. London: HarperCollins. ISBN 0007147481.
- Hunt, John (1953). The Ascent of Everest. London: Hodder & Stoughton.
- Tuckey, Harriet (2013). Everest – The First Ascent: The Untold Story of Griffith Pugh, the Man Who Made It Possible, London: Rider. ISBN 9781846043482.
