= Charles Evans (mountaineer) =

English mountaineer (1918-1995)

Sir Charles Evans FRCS
- Evans in 1953
- Born: 19 October 1918; Liverpool, England
- Died: 5 December 1995 (aged 77)
- Occupations: Surgeon, university principal

Sir Robert Charles Evans (19 October 1918 – 5 December 1995) was a British mountaineer, surgeon, and educator. He was leader of the 1955 British Kangchenjunga expedition and deputy leader of the 1953 British Mount Everest expedition, both of which were successful.

== Biography ==
Born in Liverpool, Evans was raised in Wales, (Derwen), United Kingdom, and was a fluent Welsh language speaker, speaking no English before he went to school. He was educated at Shrewsbury School and University College, Oxford, where he studied medicine. He qualified as a medical doctor in 1942 and joined the Royal Army Medical Corps.

In 1957 he married Denise Morin (1931-2023), the daughter of Nea Morin who was herself a climber and who also became president of the Alpine Club (in 1986).

== Mountaineer ==
He had previously climbed many of the classic routes in the Alps and put this experience to good use during travels in Sikkim and the Himalaya during the war. After demobilisation in 1947, he was a surgeon in Liverpool until 1957.

Evans was on Eric Shipton's 1952 British Cho Oyu expedition, a preparation for 1953. Evans was then John Hunt's deputy leader on the 1953 British Mount Everest Expedition, which made the first ascent of Everest in 1953. Evans and Tom Bourdillon were the first assault party, and made the first ascent of the South Summit.

They came to within three hundred feet of the main summit of Everest on 26 May 1953, but were forced to turn back due to tiredness, lack of enough oxygen for the return and malfunctioning of the (experimental closed-circuit) oxygen apparatus. The summit was reached by their teammates Edmund Hillary and Tenzing Norgay in the second assault party three days later, on 29 May 1953.

Evans was the leader of the successful 1955 British Kangchenjunga expedition which first climbed Kangchenjunga, the world's third highest peak. The following year he was awarded the Royal Geographical Society's Patron's Medal.

He was the Principal of the University College of North Wales (now called Bangor University) from 1958 to 1984. He was President of the Alpine Club from 1967 to 1970.

Evans was knighted in the 1969 Investiture Honours, celebrating the occasion of the investiture of the Prince of Wales, for services to mountaineering.

== Author ==
- Evans, Charles (1957). Kangchenjunga: The Untrodden Peak. New York, NY, USA: E.P. Dutton and Co. ASIN B002DFL48C.
- Evans, Charles (1955). On Climbing. Woodstock, VT, USA: The Countryman Press. ASIN B000J54WIM.

== Additional sources ==
- Robert Charles Evans 1918–1995, obituary by Michael Ward, Geographical Journal, Vol. 162, No. 2 (Jul., 1996), pp. 257–58
- Charles Clarke, "Evans, Sir (Robert) Charles (1918–1995)" Oxford Dictionary of National Biography, Oxford University Press, 2004

Academic offices
| Preceded by David Emrys Evans | Principal of the University College of North Wales | Succeeded by Eric Sunderland |
