= Western Cwm =

Valley at the foot of Mount Everest

Coordinates: 27°58′51″N 86°53′53″E

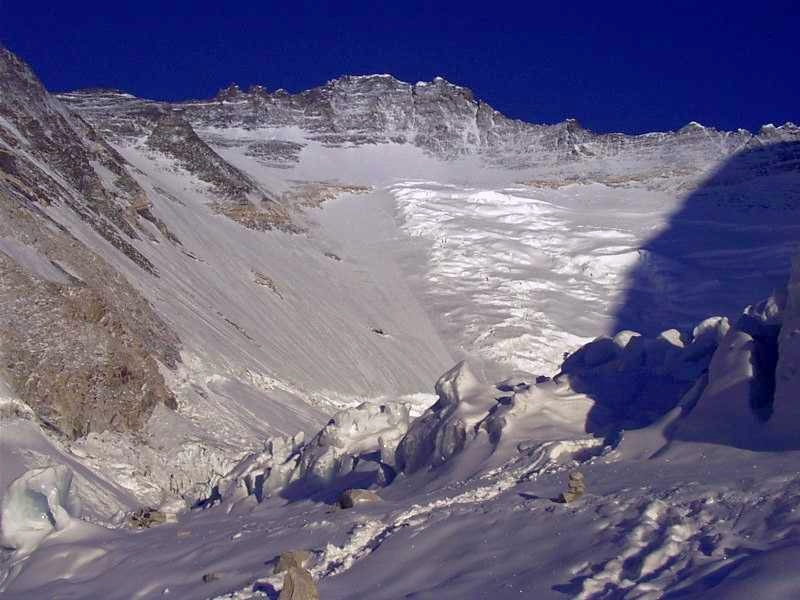
The Western Cwm with Lhotse in the background

The Western Cwm (/kuːm/) is a broad, flat, gently undulating glacial valley basin terminating at the foot of the Lhotse Face of Mount Everest. It was named by George Mallory when he saw it in 1921 as part of the British Reconnaissance Expedition that was the first to explore the upper sections of Everest, searching for routes for future summit attempts; a cwm is a valley fully enclosed by mountains, from the Welsh word for "valley".

The Western Cwm is traversed by climbers using the southeast route to the summit of Everest and is typically accessed by climbing through the Khumbu Icefall. The central section is cut by massive lateral crevasses which bar entrance to the upper Western Cwm. In this section, climbers must cross to the far right, over to the base of Nuptse, to a narrow passageway known as the Nuptse corner. From there, climbers can see the upper 2,400 m (7,900 ft) of Everest—the first glimpse of Everest's upper slopes since arriving at Base Camp.

The snow-covered, bowl-shaped slopes surrounding the Western Cwm reflect and amplify solar radiation, warming the valley basin despite its high elevation of 6,000 m (20,000 ft) through 6,800 m (22,300 ft).

== See also ==
- Geneva Spur (Eperon des Genevois)
- South Col
