= John Hunt, Baron Hunt =

British Army officer (1910–1998)

Brigadier The Right Honourable The Lord Hunt KG CBE DSO FRGS
- Born: 22 June 1910; Simla, British India
- Died: 7 November 1998 (aged 88); Henley-on-Thames, Oxfordshire, England
- Military career
- Allegiance: United Kingdom
- Branch: British Army
- Service years: 1930–1956
- Rank: Brigadier
- Service number: 44889
- Unit: King's Royal Rifle Corps
- Commands: 168th Infantry Brigade; 11th Indian Infantry Brigade; 11th Battalion, King's Royal Rifle Corps
- Conflicts: Second World War
- Awards: Knight Companion of the Order of the Garter; Knight Bachelor; Commander of the Order of the British Empire; Companion of the Distinguished Service Order
- Other work: Mountaineer

Henry Cecil John Hunt, Baron Hunt (22 June 1910 – 7 November 1998) was a British Army officer who is best known as the leader of the successful 1953 British expedition to Mount Everest.

== Early life and military career ==
Hunt was born in Simla, British India, on 22 June 1910, the son of Captain Cecil Edwin Hunt of the Indian Army, and a great-great-nephew of the explorer Sir Richard Burton. His father was killed in action during the First World War. Hunt, from the age of 10, spent much holiday time in the Alps, learning some of the mountaineering skills he would later hone while taking part in several expeditions in the Himalayas while serving in India. He made a guided ascent of Piz Palu at 14. He was educated at Marlborough College before entering the Royal Military College, Sandhurst, where he was awarded the King's gold medal and the Anson Memorial Sword.

After Sandhurst, Hunt was commissioned as a second lieutenant in the King's Royal Rifle Corps (KRRC) on 30 January 1930. Among his fellow graduates were Charles Harington and Alan Brown. In 1931, the regiment was posted to India. He was promoted lieutenant in 1933. Despite his background he seems not to have been entirely comfortable with the prevailing social climate of the Raj. He preferred rugby to polo, and having already gained fluency in German and French he added Urdu and some Bengali. In 1934 he became a Military Intelligence officer in the Indian Army, with the local rank of captain, and was seconded to the Indian Police. At this time the Indian independence movement was gaining ground, and Bengal was particularly affected. Hunt even worked undercover, gathering intelligence in Chittagong while dressed in local clothing. He returned to his regiment in 1935, having been awarded the Indian Police Medal.

Throughout this period Hunt continued to climb in the Himalayas. In 1935, with James Waller's group, he attempted Saltoro Kangri, reaching 24,500 feet (7,470 m). This exploit led to his election to the Alpine Club and the Royal Geographical Society. He applied to join the 1936 Everest Expedition, but was turned down when an RAF medical discovered a minor heart problem. (Note: A heart murmur. He was advised not to climb stairs!)

He married Joy Mowbray-Green on 3 September 1936, and she also took part (along with Reggie Cooke), in Hunt's 1937 Himalayan trip which included reconnaissance of Kangchenjunga, the south-western summit of Nepal Peak, and only the third ascent of the Zemu Gap, between Kangchenjunga and Simvo. Here they saw tracks that one of the party's Sherpas told them were those of the Yeti. In 1938 he returned for a further period of secondment in Military Intelligence, being promoted substantive captain.

== Second World War ==
Upon returning to the United Kingdom in 1940, Hunt became chief instructor at the Commando Mountain and Snow Warfare School, Braemar. He returned to regimental duty in 1943 as a war substantive major and acting lieutenant colonel, commanding officer (CO) of the 11th Battalion of the KRRC. Forming the motorised infantry element of the 23rd Armoured Brigade, Hunt led the battalion in the Italian Campaign. In 1944, Hunt received an immediate award of the Distinguished Service Order (DSO) for his leadership in bitter fighting on the River Sangro, in addition to his battalion, he commanded attached troops from other arms, and the recommendation for his DSO states that he was constantly in the forefront of the fighting, organising raids and ambushes to keep the enemy forces on the back foot, and himself leading reconnaissance patrols deep behind enemy lines. In October 1944, his battalion was transferred to Greece, just as the tensions that would lead to the Greek Civil War were becoming evident.

In Greece, Hunt was appointed temporary brigadier and given command of the 11th Indian Infantry Brigade, part of the 4th Indian Infantry Division, at Patras. He described attempting to keep the peace between the various factions as "the most tense and difficult period in all my experience, before or since". For his efforts there Hunt was appointed Commander of the Order of the British Empire (CBE) in June 1945. In contrast to Italy, he was ordered not to take the initiative and had to cope with large hostile forces threatening him, and infiltration by armed civilians as well as increasing numbers of insults to his troops. Hunt kept the situation calm, and when finally allowed to act, and reinforced he planned and executed a successful operation. He then attended the Staff College, Camberley, in 1946, followed by various staff appointments in the Middle East and Europe. He was granted the substantive rank of major in 1946, becoming substantive colonel in 1952.

== Mount Everest ==
Hunt was employed on the staff at Supreme Headquarters Allied Expeditionary Force (SHAEF) when he received the surprise invitation to lead the 1953 British Mount Everest expedition. It had been expected that Eric Shipton would lead the expedition, as he had led the (unsuccessful) British attempt on Cho Oyu the previous year from which the majority of the climbers were drawn. However, the Joint Himalayan Committee of the Alpine Club and Royal Geographical Society that oversaw British attempts on Everest decided that Hunt's military leadership experience and undoubted climbing credentials would provide the best hope for success. It was felt to be critical that this expedition should be successful as the French had permission to mount an expedition in 1954 and the Swiss in 1955, meaning that the British would not have another opportunity until 1956 at the earliest.

Many members of the expedition felt a strong loyalty to Shipton, and were unhappy with his replacement. Edmund Hillary was one of those most opposed to the change, but was soon won round by Hunt's personality and frank admission that the change had been handled badly. Hunt planned for three assaults of two climbers each including "a third and last attempt" if necessary, although after two consecutive assaults a wait would be necessary to "recover our strength" and to replenish the camps.

Base Camp was established on 12 April 1953. The next few days were taken up with establishing a route through the Khumbu Icefall, and once opened, teams of Sherpas moved tons of supplies up the mountain. A succession of advanced camps were created, slowly forging higher up the mountain. By 21 May, Wilfrid Noyce and Annullu had reached the psychological milestone of the South Col. Hunt had selected two climbing pairs to attempt the summit. The first pair (Tom Bourdillon and Charles Evans) set out on 26 May but were forced to turn back after becoming exhausted high on the mountain. On the same day, Hunt himself climbed to 8,350 metres (27,395 ft) with Da Namgyal Sherpa to leave a cache of equipment on the Southeast Ridge for the second summit party. On 28 May, the expedition made its second assault on the summit with the second climbing pair. The summit was eventually reached at 11:30 am on 29 May 1953 by the New Zealander Edmund Hillary and Sherpa Tenzing Norgay from Nepal (Norgay had previously ascended to a record mark on Everest with a Swiss expedition of 1952).

News of the expedition's success reached London on the morning of Queen Elizabeth II's coronation. Returning to Kathmandu a few days later, they discovered that Hillary had been made a Knight Commander of the Order of the British Empire and Hunt a Knight Bachelor for their efforts. He received his knighthood on his return to London in July 1953. Further honours were showered on Hunt and the expedition team: the Hubbard Medal of the National Geographic Society, the first time the medal was awarded on a collective basis, though individual bronze replicas were made for Hunt, Hillary and Norgay; the Founder's Medal of the Royal Geographical Society; the Lawrence medal of the Royal Central Asian Society; and honorary degrees from Aberdeen, Durham, and London universities.

== Later life ==
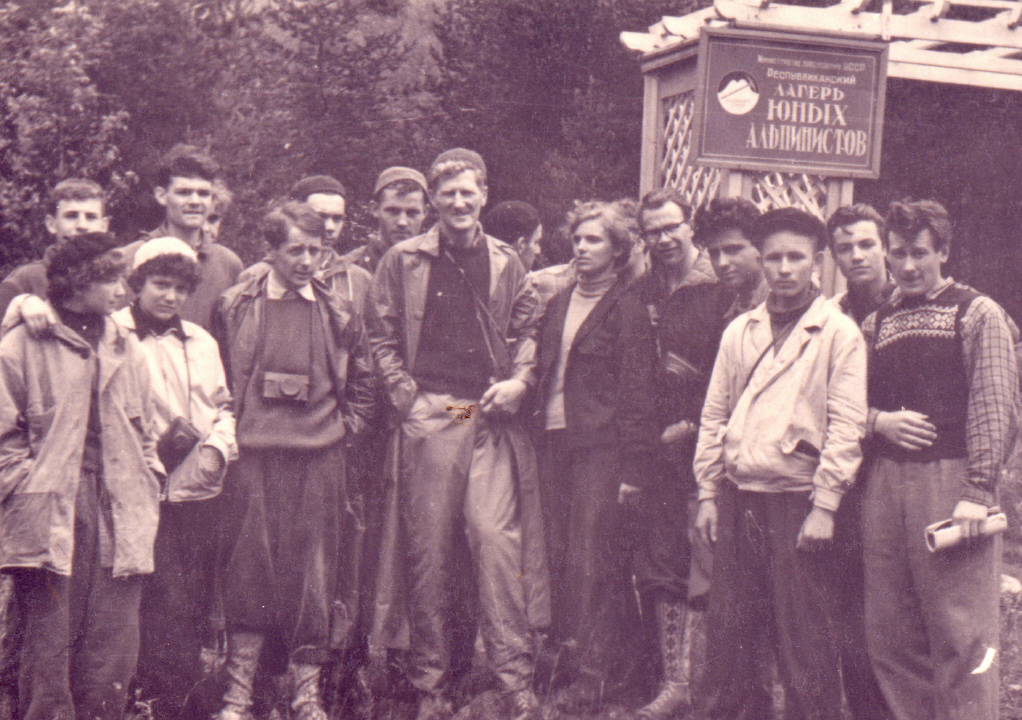
Brigadier Sir John Hunt pictured in the Caucasus, 1958

Hunt returned to active duty in the Army, being posted as assistant commandant of Sandhurst. Following his retirement from military service in 1956, when he was granted the honorary rank of brigadier, he became the first Director of the Duke of Edinburgh Award Scheme, a post he held for ten years. He left an account of the British Caucasus Expedition in 1958.

Hunt was Committee Chairman of Plas y Brenin from 1955 to 1965, and in the 1966 Birthday Honours he was created a Life Peer for his work with young people, his title being gazetted as Baron Hunt, of Llanvair Waterdine in the County of Salop.

In 1962, Hunt, as representative of the Alpine Club, was joint leader alongside Malcolm Slesser of the British contingent of the British-Soviet Pamirs Expedition with the goal of climbing Ismoil Somoni Peak in the Pamir Mountains, the highest point in the Soviet Union. Hunt retired from the expedition following the deaths of Wilfred Noyce and Robin Smith while descending from the summit of Mount Garmo.

He was the first Chairman of the Parole Board, and his advisory work on policing in Northern Ireland led to the Hunt Report with its recommendation for the disbanding of the B-Specials and creation of a purely military reserve force, which was created as the Ulster Defence Regiment. In 1974 he was appointed to the Royal Commission on the Press. He was invested as a Knight Companion of the Garter in 1979.

Lord Hunt died on 7 November 1998 aged 88 in Henley-on-Thames, Oxfordshire, having had four daughters, one being the actress Sally Nesbitt.

== Coat of Arms ==
Coat of arms of John Hunt, Baron Hunt, KG, CBE, DSO, PC
Notes Lord Hunt was granted arms in 1980. Coronet Coronet of a Baron Crest On two mountain peaks the first higher than the second a chamois statant reguardant proper. Escutcheon Argent a Himalayan black bear passant proper, a chief dancetty Azure. Supporters Dexter: On a mount of grass and reedmace proper, issuant from water barry wavy Argent and Azure, a swan wings elevated and adorsed proper; Sinister: on a rock a buzzard, wings elevated and adorsed proper. Motto ENDEAVOUR Orders Order of the Garter

== See also ==
- Sir John Hunt Community Sports College

== Bibliography ==
- Hunt, John (1953). The Ascent of Everest. Seattle, Wash: The Mountaineers. ISBN 0-89886-361-9. OCLC 482190654.
- Hunt, John (1978). Life is Meeting. OCLC 163325156. (autobiography)

== Notes ==
Non-profit organization positions
New title	Director of the Duke of Edinburgh's Award Scheme; 1956–1966	Succeeded by Alfred Blake
Academic offices
Preceded by Peter Scott	Rector of the University of Aberdeen; 1963–1966	Succeeded by Frank George Thomson
