= Khumbu Icefall =

Glacier in Nepal

Coordinates: 27°59′45″N 86°52′22″E

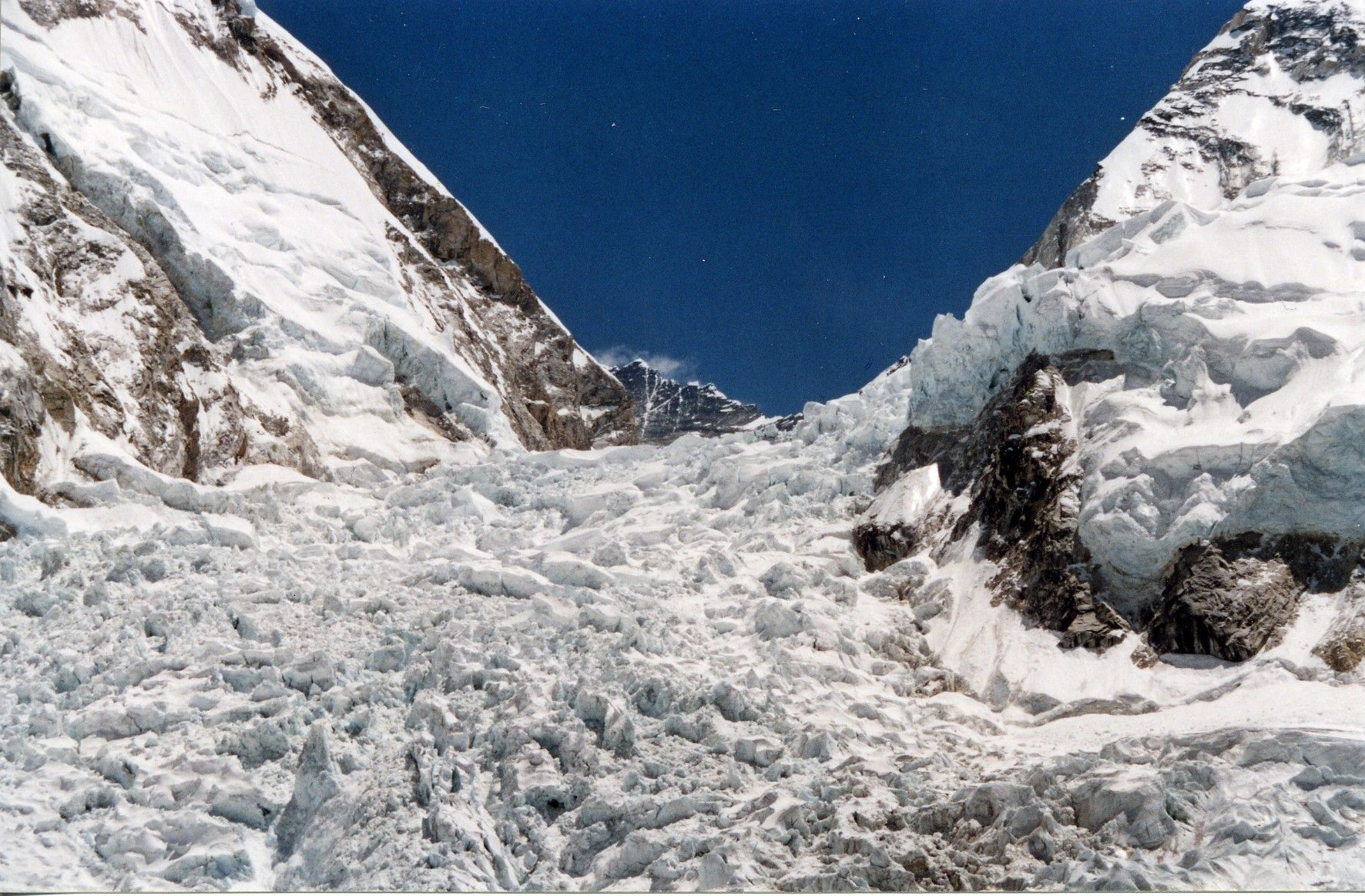
Khumbu Icefall

The Khumbu Icefall is located at the head of the Khumbu Glacier and the foot of the Western Cwm. It lies at an elevation of 5,486 metres (17,999 ft) on the Nepalese slopes of Mount Everest, not far above Base Camp and southwest of the summit. The icefall is regarded as one of the most dangerous sections of the South Col route to Everest's summit.

== Overview ==
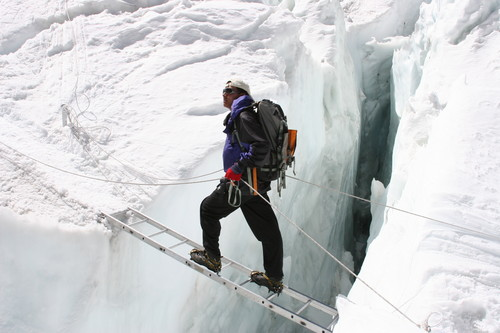
Pemba Dorjie crossing a crevasse on the Khumbu Icefall

The Khumbu Glacier moves an estimated 0.9 to 1.2 m (3 to 4 ft) down the flank of Mt. Everest every day. Ice entering the fall takes approximately 4.3 years to emerge at the base, which is 600 metres (2,000 ft) lower and 1.5 kilometres (1 mi) away horizontally. The speed of ice flow and the precipitous elevation drop create a bergschrund (iceberg shoulder), characterized at the top by massive transverse blocks that calve off the upper glacier, creating gaping crevasses (of over 100 m deep and often over 15 metres or 50 feet wide). As these massive initial glacial segments descend the fall, they are slowly twisted and crushed by the churning pressure of glacial flow, generating increasingly tortuous crevasse fields in the middle of the fall and a chaotic maze of smaller blocks toward the bottom of the fall.

Due to constant glacial motion, snow bridges concealing crevasses and overhanging ice blocks (called seracs), ranging in size from several tons to thousands of tons, can open or collapse with little warning, generating extreme danger for climbers. Crossing the Khumbu Icefall is so dangerous that even extensive rope and ladder networks installed by professional guides cannot prevent loss of life.

The official Himalayan Database records 44 deaths in the icefall between 1953 and 2016. No deaths were recorded between 2017 and 2021.

Prudent climbers place emphasis on avalanche and crevasse-fall survival and rescue techniques prior to entering this terrain. Most climbers try to pass through the icefall before sunrise, when it is usually less mobile due to freezing in the nighttime cold. As sunlight warms the area, ice-melt causes friction within the structure to decline, which increases the rate of flow and hence, crevasse opening and ice-block or serac collapse. The most dangerous time to cross the fall is generally mid-to-late afternoon. Experienced, acclimatized climbers can ascend the icefall in a few hours, while inexperienced or non-altitude-acclimatized climbers may take 10–12 hours to complete the passage. "Camp I" on Everest's South Col route is typically slightly beyond the top of the Khumbu Icefall.

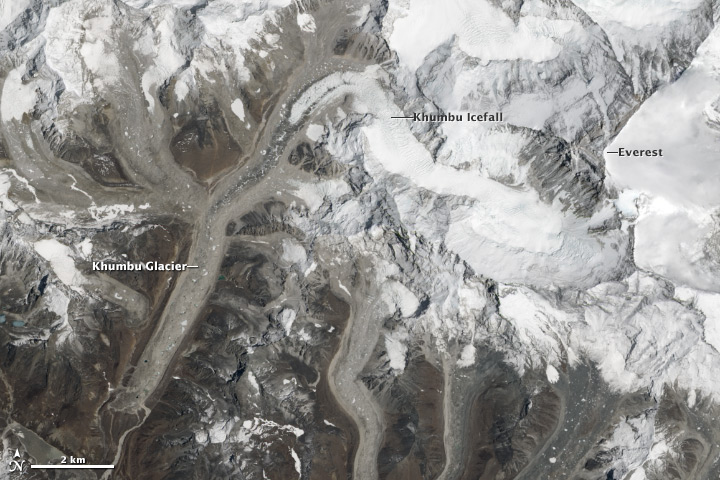
Khumbu Icefall

== 2014 avalanche ==
Around 6:30 a.m. local time on 18 April 2014, 16 Nepalese climbers were killed by an avalanche in the Khumbu Icefall. Only 13 bodies were recovered. Nine others sustained blunt trauma injuries. The climbers were preparing the route through the dangerous icefall for the spring climbing season when the avalanche engulfed them. Kaji Sherpa, one of the survivors, later described how frightening the Icefall was. He said that he was always scared there, but the workers still had to pass through the crevasses and tried to move through them quickly.

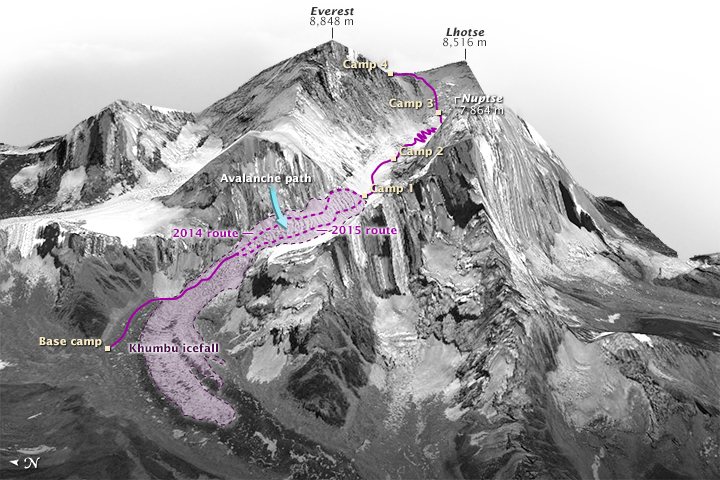
This labeled photo-diagram shows the location of the fatal ice avalanche on the 2014 route, and the revised 2015 route through the Khumbu.

== 1970 avalanche ==
On 5 April 1970, an accident occurred when 6 Sherpas lost their lives after a serac struck them while they were in the Khumbu Icefall. They were assisting in the production of the Canadian documentary The Man Who Skied Down Everest, featuring Japanese alpinist Yūichirō Miura. Miura later became the first person to successfully ski down Mount Everest.
