= South Col =

Col between Mount Everest and Lhotse

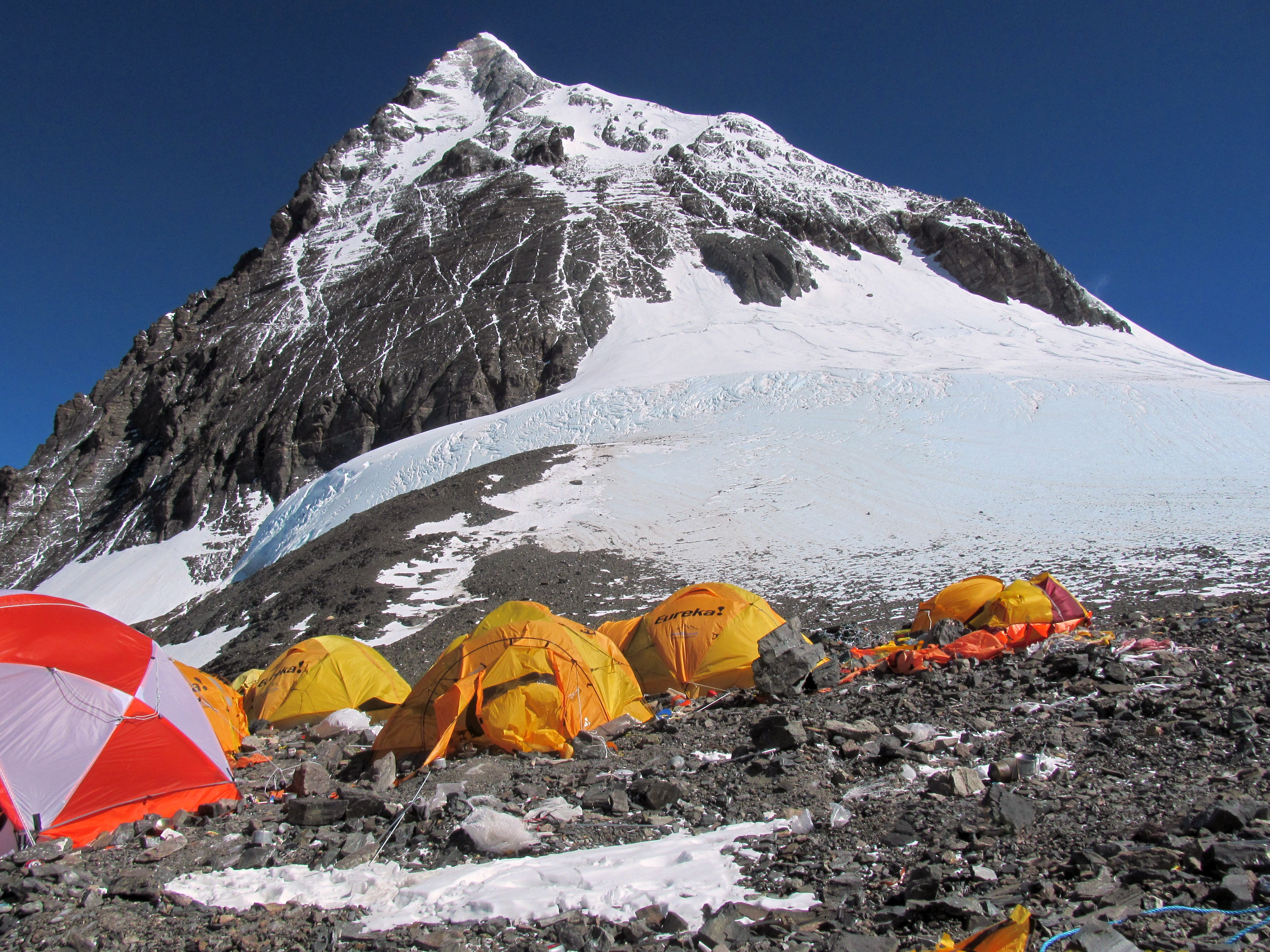
- The pinnacle in this view is the South Summit viewed from the South Col

- Location within Nepal Location within Tibet
- Elevation: 7,906 m (25,938 ft)
- Traversed by: A Swiss expedition in 1952

Third Approach
- Location: Nepal (Khumjung) – China (Tibet)
- Range: Mahalangur Himal
- Coordinates: 27°58′30″N 86°55′55.5″E

The South Col is a col between Mount Everest and Lhotse, the highest and fourth-highest mountains in the world, respectively. The South Col is typically swept by high winds, leaving it free of significant snow accumulation. Since 1950 (when Tibet was closed), most Everest expeditions have left from Nepal and gone via the southeast ridge and the South Col (instead of via the North Col). When climbers attempt to climb Everest from the southeast ridge in Nepal, their final camp (usually Camp IV) is located on the South Col.

== History ==
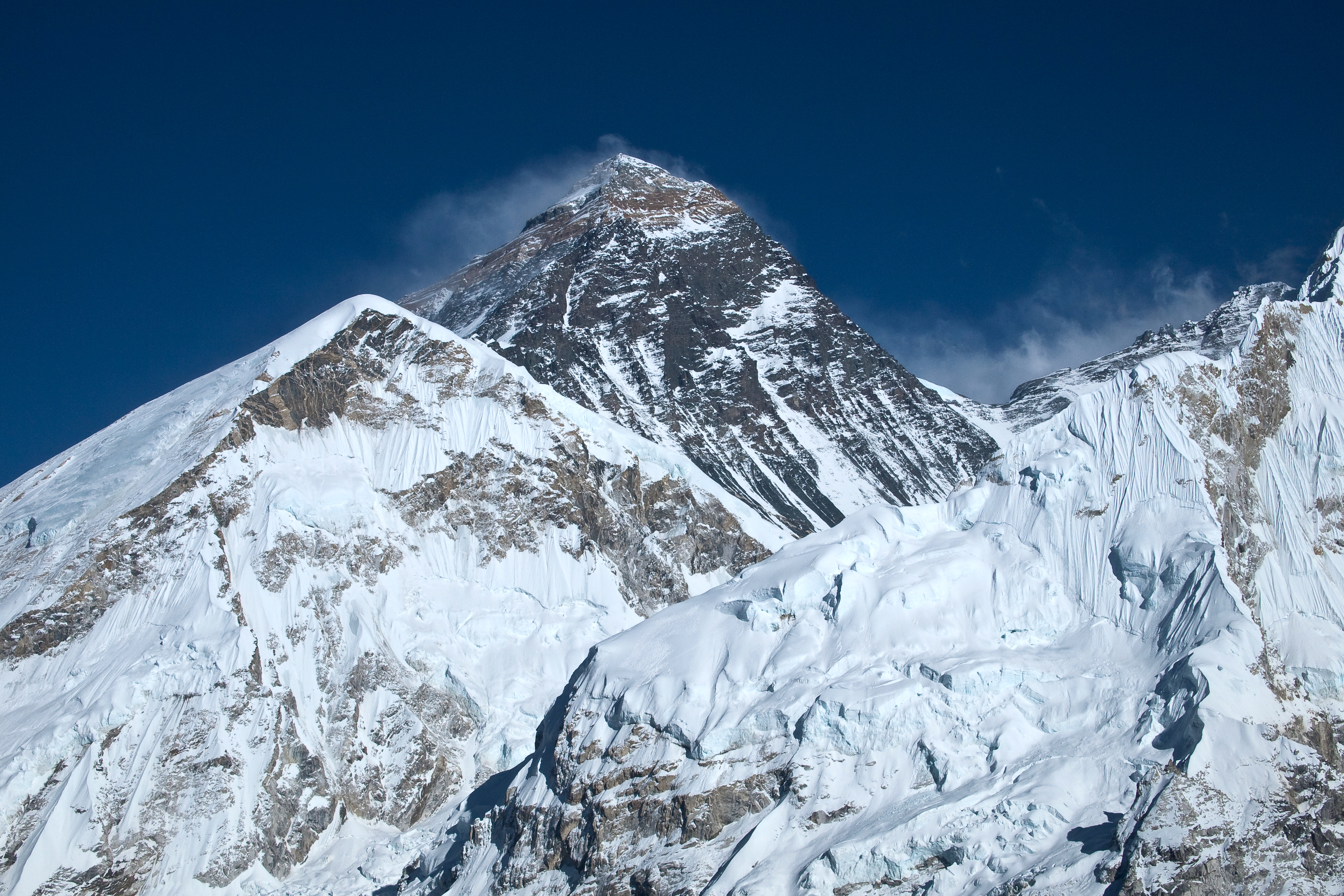
View of Mount Everest from the west. The South Col is the lowest point of the ridge on the right side. South Summit is visible just right of the main summit, being only slightly lower in height.

Sketch map of Everest region

The South Col was first reached on 12 May 1952 by Aubert, Lambert, and Flory of Edouard Wyss-Dunant's Swiss Mount Everest Expedition which failed to reach the summit. The following year, when Mount Everest was first climbed, Wilfrid Noyce and the Sherpa Annullu were the first climbers on the expedition to reach the col. According to John Hunt, the expedition leader:

It was 2.40 p.m. Wilfrid Noyce and his companion Annullu stood at that moment above the South Col of Everest, at about 26,000 feet [7,900 m]. They were gazing down on the scene of the Swiss drama, and they were also looking upwards to the final pyramid of Everest itself. It was a great moment for them both, and it was shared by all of us who watched it. Their presence there was symbolic of our success in overcoming the most crucial problem of the whole climb; they had reached an objective which we had been striving to attain for twelve anxious days.

== Climbing ==
Once on the South Col, climbers have entered the death zone; altitude sickness is a significant threat at this elevation and can easily prove fatal. It is also difficult to sleep, and most climbers' digestive systems have significantly slowed or completely stopped. This is because it is more efficient at this altitude for the body to use stored energy sources than to digest new food. Most climbers will begin using supplemental oxygen here and have a maximum of only three days to make summit bids. Clear weather and low winds are critical factors in deciding whether to make a summit attempt. If the weather is not favourable within these short few days, climbers are forced to descend, many back to Base Camp. Climbers rarely get a second chance to return to the South Col on a specific expedition.

It is possible to climb to the summit of Lhotse, then along the South Col to the summit of Everest, in less than 24 hours, a feat known as the "Double Crown". The first such successful attempt recorded was by Michael Horst in 2011, while Mingma Dorchi Sherpa holds the record for fastest traverse between the two summits at 6 hours and 1 minute, made in 2019, and Nirmal Purja holds the record for fastest such traverse without supplemental oxygen at 13 hours and 42 minutes, made in 2026.

In 2005 Didier Delsalle of France landed a Eurocopter AS350 B3 helicopter on the South Col. Two days later he made the first helicopter landing on the summit of Mount Everest, a feat he subsequently repeated.

In May 2019 the highest weather stations in the world were installed on Everest, one at the South Col and another on a place higher up on the peak known as The Balcony as well as some other stations and locations. The weather stations are about 2.1 metres (7 ft) tall and weigh 50 kg (110 lb). On 21 July 2022, a maximum temperature of −1.4 °C (29.5 °F) was registered at the South Col.

== See also ==
- Kangshung face
- Timeline of the 1996 Mount Everest disaster
