= Eric Shipton =

British explorer (1907–1977)

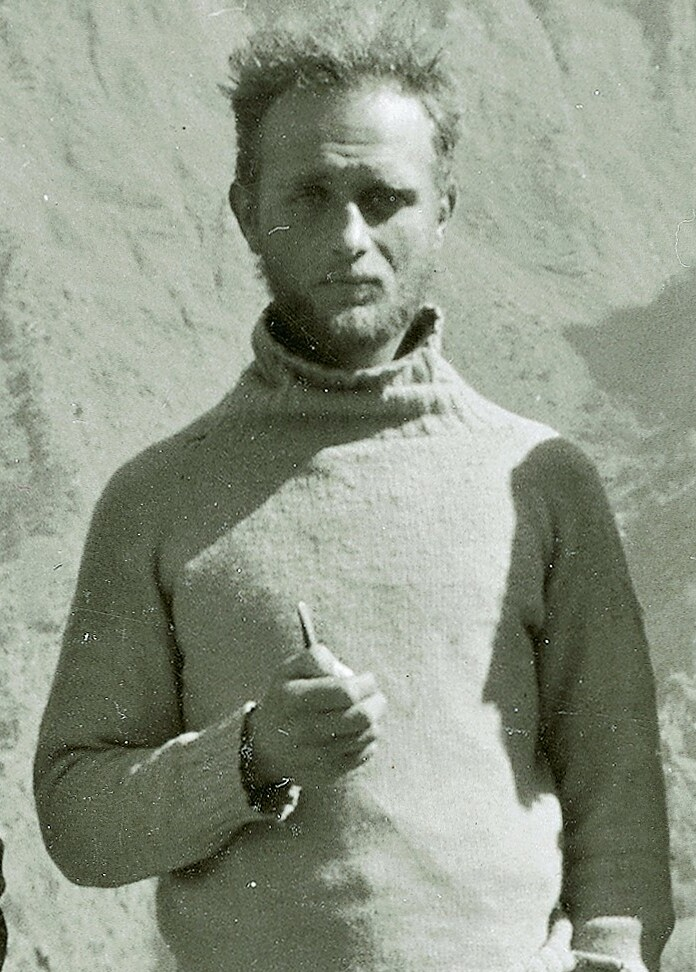
- Shipton in 1936
- Born: Eric Earle Shipton; 1 August 1907; Ceylon (now Sri Lanka)
- Died: 28 March 1977 (aged 69); Salisbury, England
- Occupations: Mountaineer, Explorer

Eric Earle Shipton, CBE (1 August 1907 – 28 March 1977), was an English Himalayan mountaineer.

== Early years ==
Shipton was born in Ceylon (now Sri Lanka) in 1907 where his father, a tea planter, died before he was three years old. When he was eight, his mother brought him to London for his education. When he failed the entrance exam to Harrow School, his mother sent him to Pyt House School in Wiltshire. His first encounter with mountains was at 15 when he visited the Pyrenees with his family. The next summer he spent travelling in Norway with a school friend and within a year he had begun climbing seriously.

== Africa and the Himalaya ==
In 1928 he went to Kenya as a coffee grower and first climbed Nelion, a peak of Mount Kenya, in 1929. It was also in Kenya's community of Europeans where he met his future climbing partners Bill Tilman and Percy Wyn-Harris. Together with Wyn-Harris, he climbed the twin peaks of Mount Kenya. With Frank Smythe, Shipton was amongst the first climbers to stand on the summit of Kamet, 7756 metres, in 1931, the highest peak climbed at that time. Shipton was involved with most of the Mount Everest expeditions during the 1930s and later, including Hugh Ruttledge's 1933 Mount Everest expedition and the follow-up in 1936, the 1935 Mount Everest expedition which was Shipton's first as leader and the first for Tenzing Norgay, and the pioneering 1951 Mount Everest expedition which chalked out the now famous route over the Khumbu Glacier. Shipton and Tilman also discovered the access route to the Nanda Devi sanctuary through the Rishi Ganga gorge in 1934. Their shoe-string budget expedition operated in the Kumaon-Garhwal mountains continuously from pre-monsoon to post-monsoon, and set a record for single-expedition achievement that has never been equalled.

== Second World War ==
During the Second World War, Shipton was appointed as HM Consul at Kashgar in western China, where he remained from 1940 to 1942, then after a brief spell in England was assigned to work in Persia as a "Cereal Liaison Officer" for 20 months during 1943–44. Next he was posted as an attaché to the British Military Mission in Hungary as an "agricultural adviser", which position saw him through until the end of the war. On his return to England, he married Diana Channer, in Lyme Regis 16 Dec 1942, who shared his love of wild country.

== Post-War years ==
In 1946 Shipton returned to Kashgar as Consul General, and during a visit from Bill Tilman they tried to climb Muztagh Ata, 7546 metres, reaching the broad summit dome. In 1947 Shipton explored and named Shipton's Arch. He took the opportunity of his Kashgar posting to explore other Central Asian mountains. The first western exploration of the Rolwaling Himal was made by Shipton in 1951 during the reconnaissance of Mount Everest. While exploring the Barun gorge he named Island Peak. In the 1951 Everest expedition, Shipton and Dr Michael Ward also took photographs of the footprints of what some believed to be the Yeti (Abominable Snowman), an ice axe being included in the photographs to show scale. Because of his belief in the efficacy of small expeditions as compared to military-style 'sieges', Shipton was stepped down from the leadership of the 1953 Everest expedition, along with Andrew Croft, in favour of Major John Hunt: "I leave London absolutely shattered", he wrote. Between the years 1953 and 1957 he worked at a variety of jobs. Shipton worked as Warden of the Outward Bound Mountain school at Eskdale until the failure of his marriage with his wife, Diana. He worked on farms, was awarded his CBE, and in 1957 led a group of students from the Imperial College of Science to the Karakoram.

== Final years ==
For the last decade of his life, Shipton continued to travel, supporting himself by lecturing and acting as a celebrity guide. He completed the second volume of his autobiography, That Untravelled World, in 1969. He visited the Galapagos Islands, Alaska, Australia, New Zealand, Rhodesia, Kenya, Chile, Bhutan and Nepal. Whilst staying in Bhutan in 1976, he fell ill; on his return to England, he was diagnosed with cancer to which he succumbed in March 1977. He was cremated in Salisbury and his ashes were scattered on Fonthill Lake in Wiltshire.

== Honours ==
- Patron's Medal of the Royal Geographical Society, 1938
- RSGS Livingstone Medal, 1951
- CBE for contribution to the conquest of Everest, 1957
- President of the Alpine Club, 1964–1967
- Tallest peak in Tierra del Fuego, Monte Shipton (2,469 Meters) commemorates his work in Patagonia

== Family ==
Shipton's granddaughter Zoe Shipton is an eminent geologist. Eric and Diana had two sons.

== Mountaineering highlights 1922–1973 ==
- 1922: Visited Cirque de Gavarnie in the Pyrenees with his family
- 1924: Mountain walking in the Jotunheimen (Norway) with Gustav Sommerfelt
- 1924 December: Guided ascent of the Gross Lohner and the Tschingelochtighorn above Adelboden
- 1925: Guided up Monte Disgrazia & first Alpine season in the Dauphiné guided by Elie Richard
- 1926: Second season with Elie Richard
- 1927: Climbed in French ranges then completed several major climbs including Zmutt Ridge
- 1928: Traversed Matterhorn, climbed major peaks in Alps
- 1929: Explored Mount Kenya then made first ascent of Nelion by east face and several other climbs
- 1930: Climbed on Kilimanjaro with Bill Tilman
- 1930: Climbed again making first ascents on Mount Kenya during which Tilman fell and had to be lowered unconscious from the face.
- 1931: First ascent with Frank Smythe of Kamet, then Shipton took part in 8 more first ascents in the Arwa Valley region
- 1932: Climbed Mount Speke, Mount Baker, and Mount Stanley with Bill Tilman
- 1933: Joined Hugh Ruttledge's unsuccessful Mount Everest expedition after which several nearby peaks were climbed
- 1933 July: Attempted crossing the Lasher Plain to Sikkim, climbed Lhonak Peak.
- 1934: With Tilman were the first to gain access to the Nanda Devi Sanctuary, the party then explored the Badrinath range, then returned to the Nanda Devi Sanctuary where they made the first ascent of Maiktoli before leaving via the Sunderdhunga Col.
- 1935: Led the Everest Reconnaissance Expedition which included Bill Tilman who was unable to acclimatise although the party made the first ascent of twenty 20,000 ft. peaks in the Everest region. Shipton gave a 19-year-old Tenzing his first opportunity as a 'porter' when he was taken on in Darjeeling.
- 1936: Joined a second Ruttledge-led attempt on Everest then returned to survey the Nanda Devi Sanctuary then climbed in the region of the Rhamini Glacier crossing the Bagini Pass
- 1937: Joined Tilman on the Shaksgam Expedition, exploring and mapping the northern approaches to K2
- 1938: Another abortive attempt on Everest with Tilman as leader
- 1939: Led The Karakoram Survey Expedition
- 1941: Climbed in the Kashgar Range
- 1942: Climbed and explored Bogdo Ola Group
- 1947: Explored Tushuk Tash and discovered Shipton's Arch, attempted Muztagh Ata
- 1948: Explored Bogdo Ola Group, attempted Chakar Aghil
- 1951: Led the Mount Everest Reconnaissance Expedition of that year, making a first attempt from Nepal, in the party for the first time was the young Ed Hillary
- 1952: Led the unsuccessful Cho Oyu Expedition, after which eleven Mountains were climbed to the west of Nangpa La
- 1957: Led the Imperial College Karakoram Expedition, surveying five glaciers in the process
- 1958: Explored at the heads of Lago Viedma & Lake Argentino; climbed peak above Onelli Glacier in Argentine Patagonia
- 1959: Expedition up the O'Higgins Glacier to the foot of Cerro Lautaro
- 1960: Crossed the Southern Patagonia Ice Field in 52 days
- 1962: Crossed the Cordillera Darwin making the first ascents of Cerro Yagán and Mount Darwin's three peaks; Unsuccessful attempt on Monte Burney
- 1963: Second abortive attempt on Monte Burney, then ascended Monte Bove and Pico Francés
- 1964/5 Starting from the San Rafael Glacier crossed the Northern Patagonia Ice Field to the Cochrane River, making the first ascent of Cerro Arco in the process.
- 1966: Unsuccessful attempt on the East Ridge of Mount Russell in Alaska
- 1973: Made first ascent of Monte Burney Via West Spur

== Bibliography ==
- Shipton, Eric. Nanda Devi. Hodder and Stoughton, London, 1936.
- Shipton, Eric. Blank on the map. Hodder & Stoughton, London, 1938.
- Shipton, Eric. Upon That Mountain. Hodder and Stoughton, London, 1943.
- Shipton, Eric. The Mount Everest Reconnaissance Expedition 1951. Hodder and Stoughton, London, 1952.
- Shipton, Eric. Mountains of Tartary. Hodder and Stoughton, London, 1953.
- Shipton, Eric. Land of Tempest. Hodder and Stoughton, London, 1963.
- Shipton, Eric. That Untravelled World. Charles Scribner and Sons, 1969. ISBN 0-340-04330-X (Hodder & Stoughton (1969))
- Shipton, Eric. Tierra del Fuego: the Fatal Lodestone. Charles Knight & Co., London, 1973 ISBN 0-85314-194-0
- Shipton, Eric. The Six Mountain-Travel Books. Mountaineers' Books, 1997. ISBN 0-89886-539-5 (A collection of the first six books listed – That Untravelled World duplicated much of the previous content.)
