= 1988 Czechoslovak - New Zealand Mount Everest Southwest Face Expedition =

Mount Everest expedition

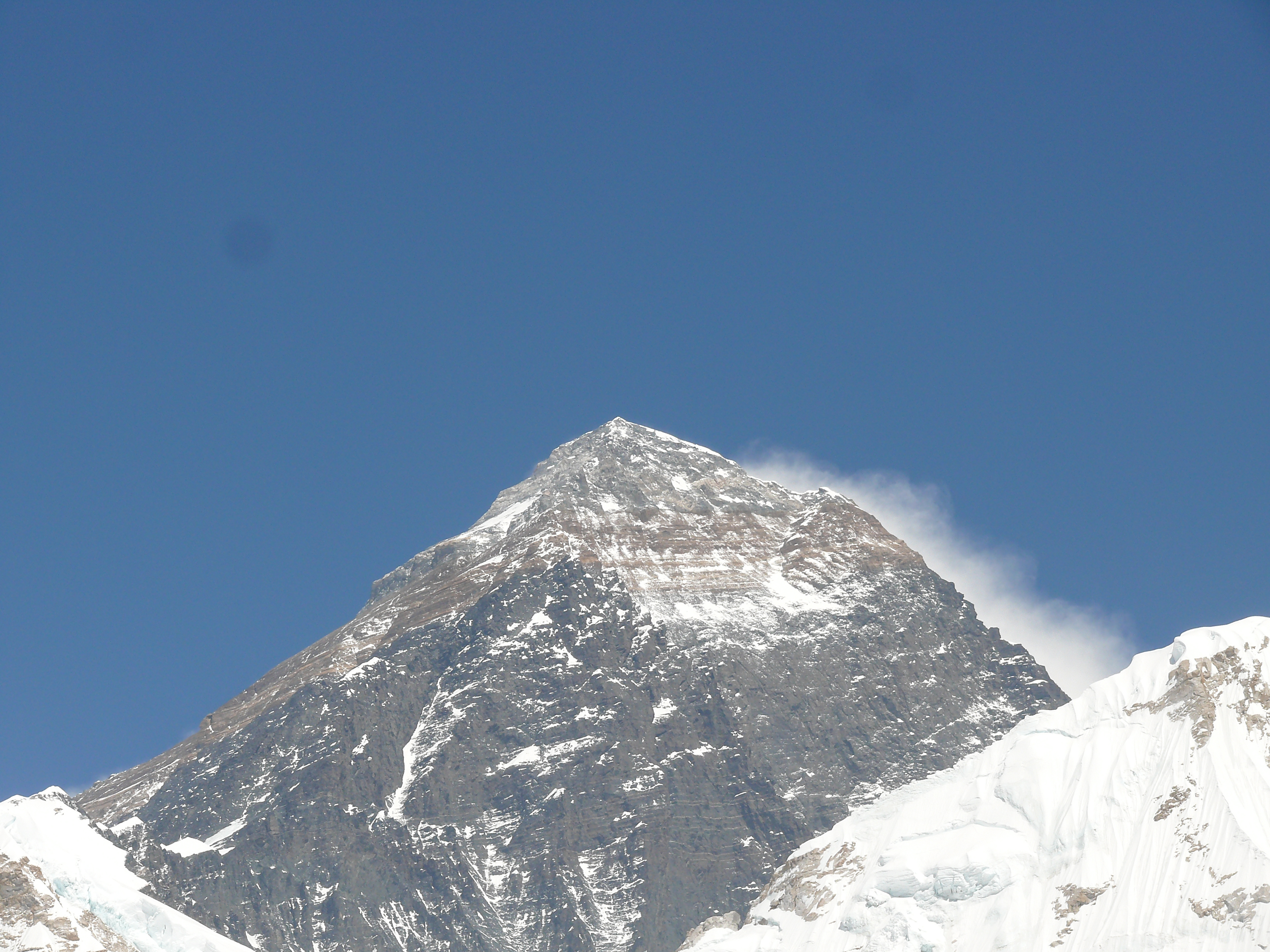
Southwest face of Mt. Everest

Bonington's Hard Way in the central part of the south west face is considered to be one of the hardest Mt. Everest routes. The route was first climbed in 1975, expedition style. At the time, the team leader Chris Bonington concluded the route could not be successfully climbed alpine style.

Four Slovak climbers from then socialist Czechoslovakia, Peter Božík, Dušan Becík, Jozef Just and Jaroslav Jaško, set off in a 1988 expedition (as part of the international project SAGARMATHA 88) to climb the Bonington route in alpine style: without supplementary oxygen and fixed ropes. Three climbers reached the South Summit and one reached the Mt. Everest Main Summit. All four disappeared during the ensuing descent. No further alpine style climbs of the route have been attempted.

== Events at the basecamp ==
Four Slovak climbers, their doctor and leader Ivan Fiala arrived at Everest Base camp at the beginning of September, 1988. At the base camp, already-present US and French expeditions had fixed ropes through the Khumbu Icefall were demanding a 7000 dollars fee from other expeditions for their use. After several negotiations, French climbers allowed the Czechoslovak – New Zealand expedition use of the ropes. The Americans agreed after a promise of material compensation. The South Koreans agreement came after a promise of fixing ropes to the camp four to Lhotse as the Slovaks wanted to summit Lhotse as part of their acclimatisation.

== Acclimatization ==
During the first week at the Everest Base Camp Dušan Becík, Jozef Just and Jaroslav Jaško established Camp I, and Dušan Becík and Jozef Just established Camps II and III. Sherpas carried food and material to the camps. On 28 September Dušan Becík and Jozef Just summited Lhotse as part of their acclimatisation. Peter Božík and Jaroslav Jaško later reached Camp IV, where they spent one night before descending to the lower camps.

== The climb ==
=== 12th of October ===
The party leaves Base Camp and reaches Camp II (6400 m).

=== 14th of October ===
The party leaves Camp II at 3 AM and begins the alpine style climb of Bonington's Hardway. First radio call at 6 PM – the climbers have built a bivouac at 8100 m under the most difficult part of the climb – stone wall of V – VI UIAA degree. They report the ascent to the bivouac was slowed down by the hard icy terrain.

=== 15th of October ===
Four climbers start climbing the stone wall at 8:30. The two hundred meters long climb takes the whole day and a second bivouac is established at 8400 m. They report the climb to be more difficult than previously expected and don't report any health issues.

=== 16th of October ===
First radio call at 11 AM. The group is traversing the snow field to the south summit that can be visually confirmed from expedition doctor and climber Emil Hasík's position at Camp II. Dušan Becík is slightly lagging behind the group and vomiting. The traverse is very slow and the climbers, not reaching the South Summit, need to establish a third bivouac at 8600 m in the evening. In a radio call at 9.30 PM, the climbers don't mention any health issues except exhaustion and Dušan's state is reported to be better.

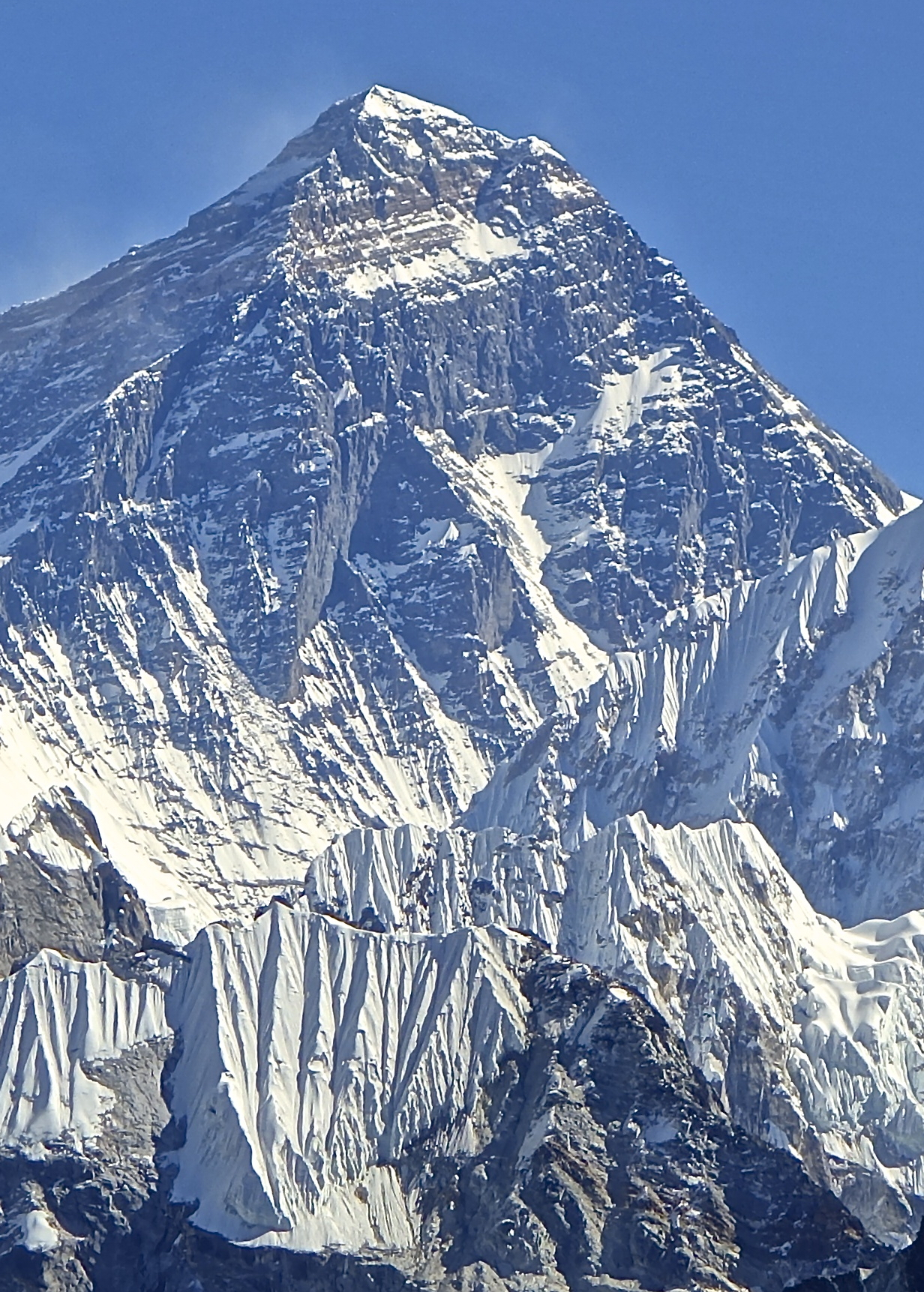
Southwest Face of Mt. Everest

=== 17th of October ===
9 AM radio call reports that the climbers are leaving the bivouac and heading towards the South Summit (8760 m). They estimate to reach the South Summit at 10 AM and the main summit at 11 AM (8848 m).

1:40 PM radio call between Jozef Just and Camp II; he reports reaching the main summit alone. He doesn't know the positions of Peter and Jaro, if they are descending or ascending, because they separated during the summit attempt. He also reports very strong wind.

2:00 PM radio call between Camp II and Jozef Just, who is still on the summit of Mt. Everest. He reports that Dušan, who decided not to attempt to reach the main summit, waits for him at the South summit.

3:00 PM radio call from South Summit during which Jozef states that Dušan is not waiting for him there. He suggests that Peter and Jaro turned around and are descending. His speech and articulation is showing utmost exhaustion. He is complaining about sight problems.

4:00 PM radio call during which Jozef states he is with Peter and Jaro, but that they are also having problems with sight and orientation.

5:30 PM radio call. Jozef reports that they are approximately at the halfway point between the summit and the South Col. Dušan has reconnected with their group and can see better than them. He reports Jaro to be lethargic and unwilling to continue. He reports they have good orientation in terrain and will make another radio call after reaching the South Col. A group of three American climbers and two sherpas are climbing to the South Col, which they estimate reaching around 5 PM, when they may be able to visually locate the descending Slovak group to provide help.

No further calls between Camp II and the four Slovak climbers is established. Jozef Just who was communicating through radio doesn't respond. Diana Dailey, Dave Hambly, and Donald Goodman reach the South Col, where in spite of strong wind the visibility is good. They cannot see anybody descending from the South Summit. They continue to visually monitor the terrain until the late night when strong wind changes into a 120 – 160 km/h hurricane.

=== 18th of October ===
10 AM radio call. American climbers report that nobody reached their camp at South Col and nobody can be seen descending up to 8500 m. After checking all remaining tents at South Col, the American climbers descend to Camp III, which is also deserted.

Ivan Fiala, leader of the expedition, calls for the formation of a group of the strongest Sherpas, who would reach the South Col and attempt to look for Slovak climbers. He offers 25 times the daily wage, but the storm is considered to be too dangerous.

== See also ==
- List of Mount Everest expeditions
- List of Mount Everest summiteers by frequency
- List of Mount Everest records
- List of people who died climbing Mount Everest
