= Hillary Step =

Formerly one of the final and most challenging parts in summiting Mt Everest

Coordinates: 27.9871066°N 86.9256306°E

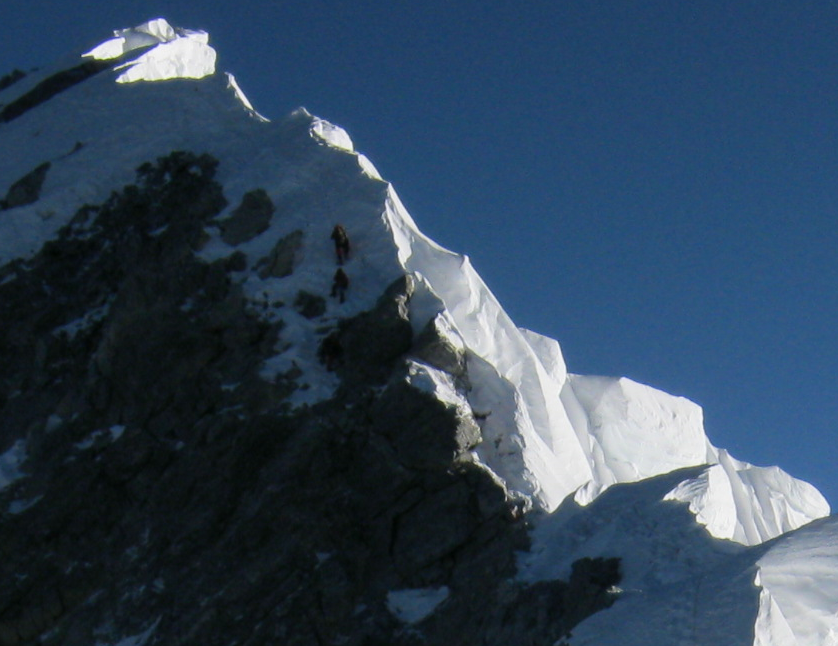
The Hillary Step (with two climbers on it) on the ridge leading up to the summit (2010 photo)

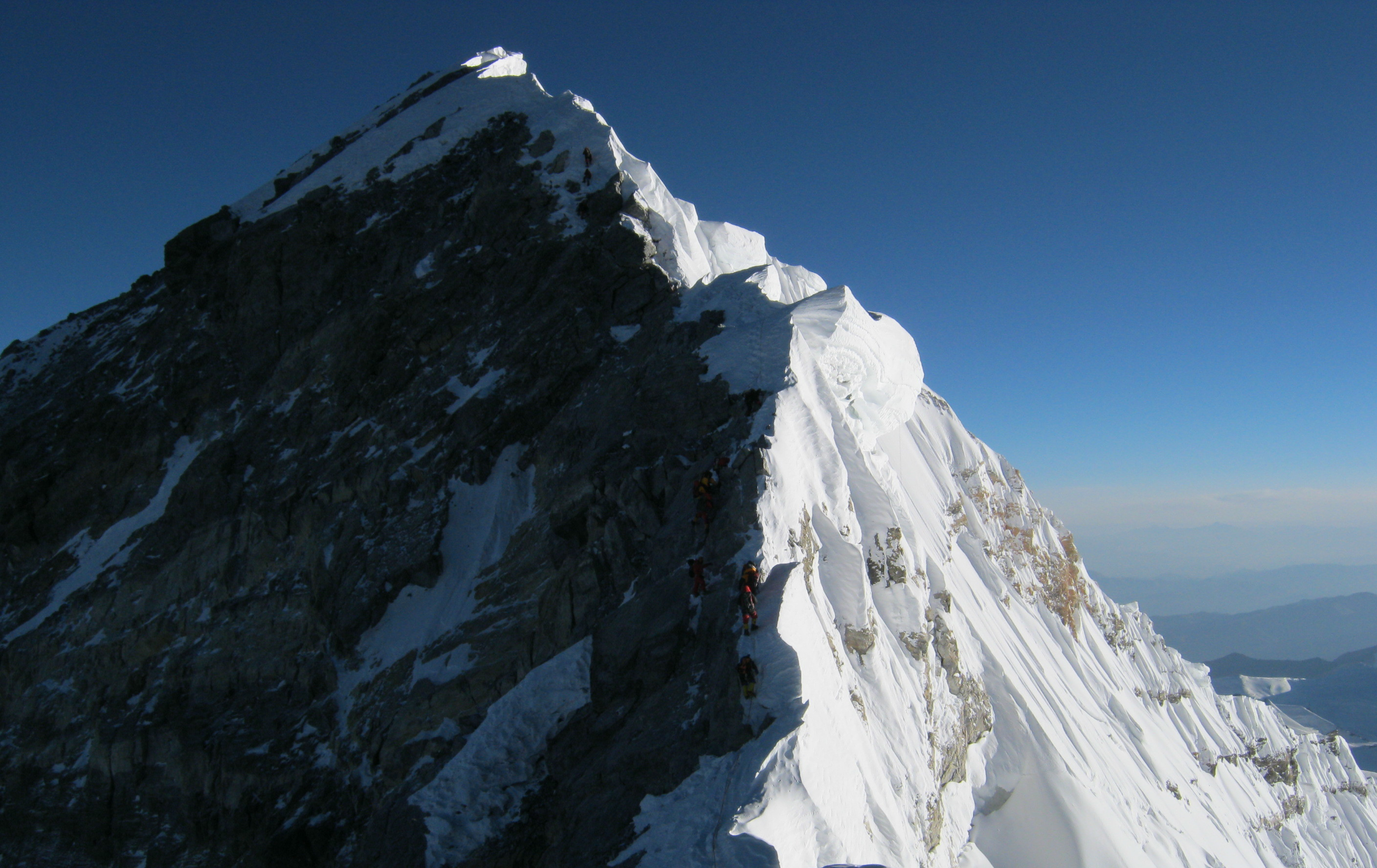
An uncropped view of the previous picture, looking up along the southern ridge line. The face of the snow-covered step is visible with two climbers on it. The face in shadow on the left is the South-West face, and in the light to the right is the top of the East / Kangshung face.

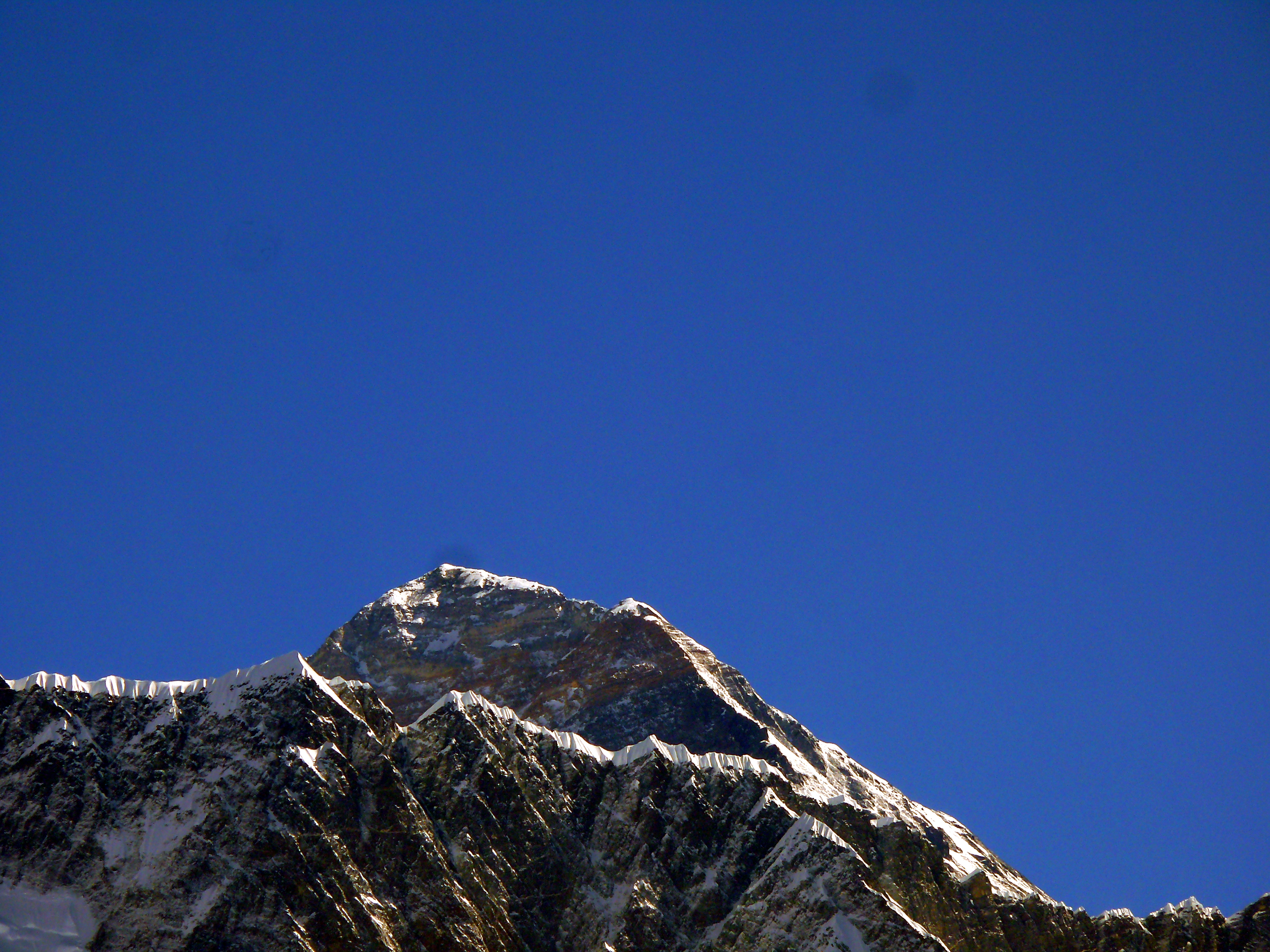
In this pre-2015 view of Mount Everest seen from the west, the high point is the summit; to its the right, the southeast ridge slopes down to the Hillary Step, then rises up to the South Summit.

The Hillary Step was a 40-foot (12 m) vertical rock face that sat 8,790 metres (28,839 ft) above sea level on the southeast ridge of Mount Everest. Some 30 metres (98 ft) vertically below the mountain's 8,849-metre (29,032 ft) summit, it lay halfway between the "South Summit" and topping out. It was the most technically difficult part of the typical Nepal-side Everest route, and the last real challenge before completing the final stage of the climb. The rock face was destroyed by the April 2015 Nepal earthquake.

Located in the death zone, the Hillary Step was a Class 4 pitch. One expedition noted that climbing the Hillary Step was "strenuous" and offered little to no escape from unpredictable, rapidly changing weather.

Heavy snowfall could enable climbers to bypass Hillary using snow and ice climbing techniques.

The Hillary Step has claimed several climbers' lives. In 1997, mountaineer Anatoli Boukreev – known for saving the lives of climbers during the 1996 Mount Everest disaster – found the body of Bruce Herrod hanging from ropes at the base of the step; Herrod had died during a climb two weeks after the 1996 disaster.

== Climbing ==
The step was first observed at close hand during the 1953 British Mount Everest Expedition by the First Assault Party of Tom Bourdillon and Charles Evans when they reached the South Summit on 26 May at 13:00, too late to continue on. Seated on the snow dome, they could look closely at the last 90 m (300 ft) vertical ascent remaining to the summit. It was not the gentle snow ridge they had hoped for, but a thin crest of snow and ice on rock, steep on the left, overhanging as a cornice on the right. It was interrupted by a formidable-looking 12 m (40 ft) rock step two-thirds of the way up.

The feature was named the Hillary Step after mountainer Sir Edmund Hillary, who led Sherpa Tenzing Norgay up a gap between the rock face and the snow to became the first pair to climb it during their 1953 ascent of Mount Everest. Positioned just below the summit ridge, it marked the final major technical obstacle on the Southeast Ridge route.

In his 1953 account of summiting Everest, he wrote:

After an hour’s steady going we reached the foot of the most formidable-looking problem on the ridge – a rock step some forty feet [12 m] high. We had known of the existence of this step from aerial photographs, and had also seen it through our binoculars from Thyangboche. We realised that at this altitude it might well spell the difference between success and failure. The rock itself, smooth and almost holdless, might have been an interesting Sunday afternoon problem for a group of expert rock climbers in the Lake District, but here it was a barrier beyond our feeble strength to overcome. I could see no way of turning it on the steep rock bluff on the west, but fortunately another possibility of tackling it still remained. On its east side was another great cornice, and running up the full forty feet [12 m] of the step was a narrow crack between the cornice and the rock. Leaving Tenzing to belay me as best he could, I jammed my way into this crack, then kicking backwards with my crampons I sank their spikes deep into the frozen snow behind me and levered myself off the ground. Taking advantage of every little rock hold and all the force of knee, shoulder and arms I could muster, I literally cramponed backwards up the crack, with a fervent prayer that the cornice would remain attached to the rock. Despite the considerable effort involved, my progress although slow was steady, and as Tenzing paid out the rope I inched my way upwards until I could finally reach over the top of the rock and drag myself out of the crack on to a wide ledge. For a few moments I lay regaining my breath and for the first time really felt the fierce determination that nothing now could stop us from reaching the top. I took a firm stand on the ledge and signalled to Tenzing to come on up. As I heaved hard on the rope Tenzing wriggled his way up the crack and finally collapsed exhausted at the top.

In more recent years, the ascent and descent over Hillary Step were generally made with the assistance of fixed ropes, usually placed there by the first ascending team of the season. In favourable conditions, it was about two hours from the South Summit to the Step, one to two hours to climb it, and a further 20 minutes from its top to the summit of Everest. Before 2015, the narrowness along this section meant that only one climber could pass at a time, and as the number of ascents grew it often became a bottleneck, with climbers waiting their turn on the fixed ropes and slowing movement both up and down the route.

== 2015 alteration ==
It was suspected in 2016 that the April 2015 Nepal earthquake had altered the Hillary Step, but there was so much snow it was not clear whether it had truly changed. Kenton Cool wrote that the Hillary Step "is only 12 to 15 feet [3.7 to 4.6 m] high." In May 2017, Tim Mosedale and other climbers reported that "the Hillary Step is no more", although the full extent and interpretation of the changes were still nascent. Another climber who thought the Step changed by 2016 was six-time Everest summiteer David Liaño Gonzalez, who had summited in 2013 and again in 2016, after the relevant changes are reported to have occurred. However, some important Nepalese climbers, including Ang Tshering Sherpa, chairman of the Nepal Mountaineering Association, reported that the Step was still intact but covered in more snow than before. Later in the year, after seeing a large exhibition of photos from 2006 to 2016, he did agree that at least the upper portion of the step had indeed changed.

Peter Hillary, Edmund Hillary's son, was asked his opinion about the Step based on photos. He agreed it was there in part, but seemed to think it had undergone some sort of a change, noting especially what looked like a fresh broken rock. By early June 2017, more reports and photographic evidence came in, with Garrett Madison reporting that the step had conclusively changed. Dave Hahn, who has climbed Everest 15 times, was shown photos and agreed that it was changed. A special kind of mourning hit the community with realization of missing rocks and freshly hewn scars of new coloured rock at this landmark feature. Hahn noted how it was a great tribute to Hillary and Tenzing and he thought of them whenever he scrambled over it.

Later in 2017, mountaineering guide and trained photographer Lhakpa Rangdu mounted a photo exhibition at the Nepal Tourism Board showing how the Hillary Step area had changed. Rangdu has climbed Everest multiple times since 2005, including before and after the big Nepal earthquake. The combination of these skills—high-altitude photography and mountaineering—allowed him to provide a photographic history of the Hillary Step, and he has said that it is indeed gone.

== See also ==
- Hillary Montes (also named after Edmund Hillary)
- Hillary Peak (also named after Edmund Hillary)
- Aiguille du Dru (2005 rock-fall ended climbing of Bonatti route)
- Aoraki / Mount Cook (2013 rock-fall shortened mountain)
- Three Steps
