= Oxford University Mountaineering Club =

British organisation founded in 1909

The Oxford University Mountaineering Club (OUMC) was founded in 1909 by Arnold Lunn, then a Balliol undergraduate; he did not earn a degree.

== History ==
The club has taken a significant part in the development of mountaineering in the United Kingdom, and many British climbers have been members of the club. Andrew Irvine was at Merton College and was a member of the OUMC at the time of his fatal attempt to climb Everest with George Mallory. Tom Bourdillon (whose father was one of the club's founders), Charles Evans and Michael Westmacott, all former members of the OUMC, were members of the successful 1953 British Expedition to Everest. Evans was Deputy Leader to John Hunt on that expedition, Bourdillon was responsible for the oxygen apparatus, and Westmacott was in charge of keeping the dangerous passage through the Khumbu Icefall open. Bourdillon and Evans made the first attempt on the summit, on 26 May 1953, three days before the successful climb by Sir Edmund Hillary and Tenzing Norgay. They reached the South Summit (at 8750 m then the highest summit to have been climbed), but had to turn back due to severe exhaustion. Charles Evans was later the Leader of the first successful expedition to Kangchenjunga in 1955.

Stephen Venables was the first British climber to climb Everest without using an oxygen cylinder; he climbed to the South Col via the Kangshung Face, creating a new route, and then went solo to the summit, as his colleagues were exhausted.

The club has sent exploratory mountaineering expeditions to mountain ranges all over the world. It claims first ascents of peaks in such places as Greenland, the Himalayas, the Karakoram, Kishtwar, Peru, Spitsbergen, and Wakhan.

== Governance ==
The club is operated by committee – the executive (president, secretary, treasurer) is always made up from Oxford University Students but the wider committee roles are open to any members.

== Oxford University Women's Mountaineering Club ==
The Oxford University Women's Mountaineering Club was formed for the first time in 1924. It was formed by graduates but "intended for both past and present Oxford women". Those instrumental in the club's foundation were Jean Orr-Ewing, Dora Butterworth (LMH, 1917-1921), M. Budenburg (St Hugh's), A. Bull (Somerville) and B. Ritchie (St. Hilda's). The OUWMC was active until 1937 with meets in the UK and abroad every year.

The OUWMC was briefly resurrected in 1943 and 1950. It then reformed again in 1953 and regular meets were held in Wales and the Lake District, sometimes these were held in the same area as an OUMC meet so that the groups could benefit from the each other's presence. By 1955 the two groups were each invited to attend the other's meetings.

Further milestones were:

- 1959: women were permitted limited membership of the OUMC and were invited to all but the annual dinner, events on the term-cards being the same for the two clubs.
- 1961: a motion was passed at the AGM of the OUMC to give ladies full membership rights, and by the end of 1961 the OUWMC had been disbanded.
- 1983: Elizabeth Jolley became the first female president of the OUMC.

== Oxford Alpine Club ==
The Oxford Alpine Club was established in 1876 by 'members of the Alpine Club who were resident at Oxford University and shared an interest in alpine pursuits'. In 1909 the newly founded Oxford University Mountaineering Club accepted undergraduate members and the Oxford Alpine Club accepted alumni of the University. The club was dissolved in 1924 and then re-established in 1934. In its new form the OAC became open to “resident and non-resident members of the University of Oxford (other than undergraduates in residence) who are interested in mountaineering”.

== Functions and traditions ==
The club usually meets on a Wednesday during Oxford term time at the Gardeners Arms pub. This is where members can sign up to go on weekend 'meets'. Meets are organised climbing trips facilitated by the hire of a minibus and campsite. The club meets typically include overnight trips to Dartmoor, the Lake District and Cornwall and single day trips to the Wye Valley and Peak District. Alongside outdoor climbing trips the club organises:

- a roped up pub crawl in the first weeks of term – where all attendees must negotiate the streets of Oxford whilst being tied to one another.
- a ceilidh.
- a Christmas dinner.

== Notable members ==
- Sir Arnold Lunn (1888–1974), Balliol, president
- Robert Benedict Bourdillon (1889–1971), Balliol
- Andrew Irvine (1902–1924), Merton
- Charles Evans (1918–1995), New College
- David Cox (1913–1994), Hertford College, president
- Tom Bourdillon (1924–1956), Balliol, president
- Anthony Rawlinson (1926–1986), Christ Church, president
- Michael Westmacott (1925–2012), Balliol, president
- Sir Anthony James Leggett (b. 1938), Balliol
- Stephen Venables (b. 1954), New College
- George Atkinson (b. 1994), Linacre College

== Other notable mountaineering clubs ==
- Preston Mountaineering Club
- Glasgow University Mountaineering Club
