= 2007 Indian Army Everest Expedition =

25 members, including 13 sherpas, of the Indian Army Everest Expedition 2007, scaled Mount Everest, the world's highest peak, on May 15 and 16, 2007. This was the fourth expedition by the Indian Army to Everest, but the first from Tibet side, and the treacherous North face. Earlier, Indian Army Everest Expeditions have scaled the peak in 1965, 2001, 2003, and, by an all women army expedition, in 2005.

== Selection and Training of the Indian Army Everest Expedition 2007 ==
From the scores of volunteers for the expedition, the Army short listed 54. The selected persons after rigorous training, and screening at the Western Himalayan Mountaineering Institute in Manali, were sent on training, screening, cum-preparatory expeditions to Mount Bhagirthi-II (6,510 m) and Mount Mana (7,273 m) in Garhwal Himalaya. The second stage of the training, screening, cum-preparatory process, was conducted in the Siachen Glacier, in December 2006, during which expeditions were launched to scale heights in North and the central glacier. In March 2007, a 20-member team consisting of 3 officers, 4 Junior Commissioned Officers and 13 Non-commissioned officers was selected.

== Composition of the Expedition ==
The leader of the Indian Army Everest Expedition 2007, was Lt Colonel Ishwor Singh Thapa, 38, of the 4 Maratha Light Infantry. The medical officer was Major Chanchal Kumar Haldar of the Army Medical Corps. The expedition had 20 members (14 climbers, 6 supporting staff) and 13 Sherpas.

== Summiteer ==
=== Indian Army Summiteers ===
The first group, which scaled the peak on 15 May 2007, included: Capt DJ Singh, Subedar M Khandagle, Havaldars Tshering Angchok, Balwant Singh Negi, Amardev Bhatt, Nandkumar Jagtap, sepoy Sachin Patil. The second group, which reached the summit on 16 May, included: Havildar Mingmar Sherpa (5/4 GR), Nandkumar Jagtap, Rambahadur Mall, Dayanand Dhali, Tejpal Singh and Khemchand.

=== Sherpa Summiteers ===
The 12 Sherpas who reached the peak with the Indian Expedition were: Phurba Chotar, Karma Sherpa, Pasang Gyalgen, Ang Kami, Jangbu Sherpa, Sherap Sherpa, Damai Chhiri, Ngwang Pasang, Tashi Sherpa, Dawa Gyalzen, Tshering Finjo, and Sirdar Chhiring Dorjeehe. Sirdar Chhiring Dorjeehe, scaled Everest twice with the Indian Army expedition, first time on the 15 May and the second time on 16 May. This was in addition to scaling the peak on 2 May, the day of Buddha Purnima, when he placed a statue of Lord Buddha on Everest. He thus climbed Everest three times in a span of two weeks.

=== Time Line ===
- 2006. Selection and Training of the Indian Army Everest Expedition 2007, including conduct of expeditions to Mount Mana, 7273 meters, near Badrinath, and peaks in the Saichen glacier.
- 20 March 2007. Gen J J Singh, Chief of Army Staff, flags off the expedition in Delhi.
- 28 March 2007. 20 member Indian Army Everest Expedition 2007, reach Kathmandu to 'marry up' with Sherpas, and check equipment. The team is divided into 14 climbers, and 6 support staff
- 31 March 2007. Team leaves Kathmandu for Lhasa, Tibet
- 2 April 2007. Team leaves Lhasa by road Gyatse- Shigatse- Tigri for base camp, at 17000 feet. Week-long acclimatization starts.
- 17 April 2007. The advanced base camp( ABC) at 21,000 feet, established. Next stage of acclimatization starts . Preparation start for setting up camp 1.
- 21–28 April 2007. Establish Camp 1, 23,000 feet.
- 28 April 2007. 16 persons move to camp 1. Bad weather, including blizzard and heavy winds, force team back to ABC on 29 April, and down to base camp. This alters plan to climb Everest on 9 May.
- 8 May 2007. Weather relents.
- 9 May 2007. First group, consisting of 1 officer, 1 JCO, and 4 ORs, along with Sherpas, move from base camp to intermediate camp.
- 13 May 2007. Second group reaches Camp1.
- 15 May 2007. Capt D.J. Singh, Subedar M. Khandagle, Havildar Tshering Angchok, Havildar Balwant Singh Negi, Havildar Amardev Bhatt and Sepoy Sachin Patil, including 6 Sherpas, reach summit at 6 a.m.( Nepal Time). Second group, start ascent at 10 p.m.
- 16 May 2007. 300 meters short of the summit, ascent stalled by heavy snow. Mingmar Sherpa, of 5/4 Gorkha Rifles, recommends to team leader that ascent continue. The 6 members of team, and 6 Sherpas, reach Mount Everest, at 06:15 a.m. They spends 30 minutes at the summit.

== See also ==
- List of Mount Everest expeditions
