= Francis William Bourdillon =

British poet

Francis William Bourdillon (22 March 1852 at Runcorn, Cheshire, England – 13 January 1921 at Buddington, Midhurst) was a British poet and translator. He is known also as a bibliophile.

== Life ==
Born at Trinity Parsonage, Halton Road, Runcorn, Cheshire, Francis William Bourdillon was the eldest son of Rev. Francis Bourdillon, the author, at that time perpetual curate of Runcorn. He was educated at Haileybury College (a boarding school in Hertfordshire) and Worcester College, Oxford, graduating B.A. 1877, M.A. 1882. From 1876 to 1879, he acted as tutor to the sons of Prince Christian of Schleswig-Holstein.

Later Bourdillon lived in Eastbourne, and near Midhurst, Sussex. His friends included Audrey Boyle (1853/4–1916), later as wife of Hallam Tennyson, 2nd Baron Tennyson, known as Audrey Lady Tennyson.

== Writer ==
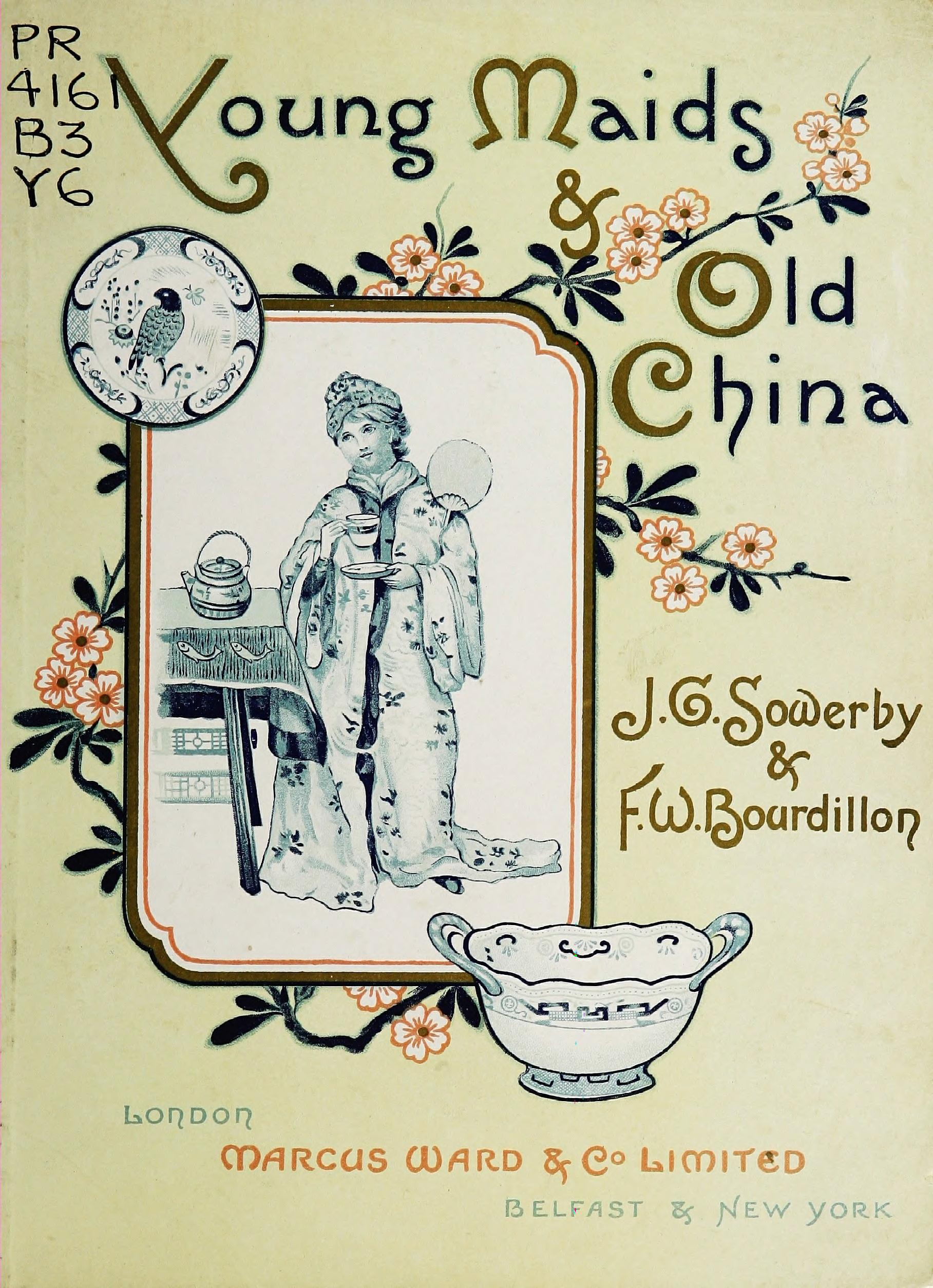
Page from Young Maids & Old China verses by Francis William Bourdillon, images by John George Sowerby

Bourdillon is known for his poetry, and in particular, for the single short poem "The Night Has a Thousand Eyes". He had numerous collections published:

- Among The Flowers, And Other Poems (1878, 1883)
- Ailes d'alouette (1890)
- A Lost God (1891)
- Love Lies Bleeding (1891)
- Love in a Mist (1892)
- Sursum corda (1893)
- Chryseis (1894)
- Minuscula: lyrics of nature, art and love (1897, from three volumes of verse published anonymously at Oxford in 1891, 1892, and 1894)

A scholar of Old French, he studied the original manuscript of Aucassin et Nicolette and translated it as Aucassin and Nicolet (1887). He wrote the scholarly The Early Editions of the Roman de la Rose (1906),

In 1896, Bourdillon published Nephelé, a romantic novel. Other works were Gerard and Isabel: a Romance in Form of Cantefable (1921) and also Preludes and Romances (1908) as well as Russia Reborn (1917), and various essays which the Religious Tract Society published.

== Family ==
Bourdillon married Agnes Smyth, and they lived at Buddington, near Midhurst. They had three children, including the World War I pilot and later medical researcher Robert Benedict Bourdillon (1889–1971). The mountaineer Tom Bourdillon (1924–1956) was a grandson.
