= List of Mount Everest expeditions =

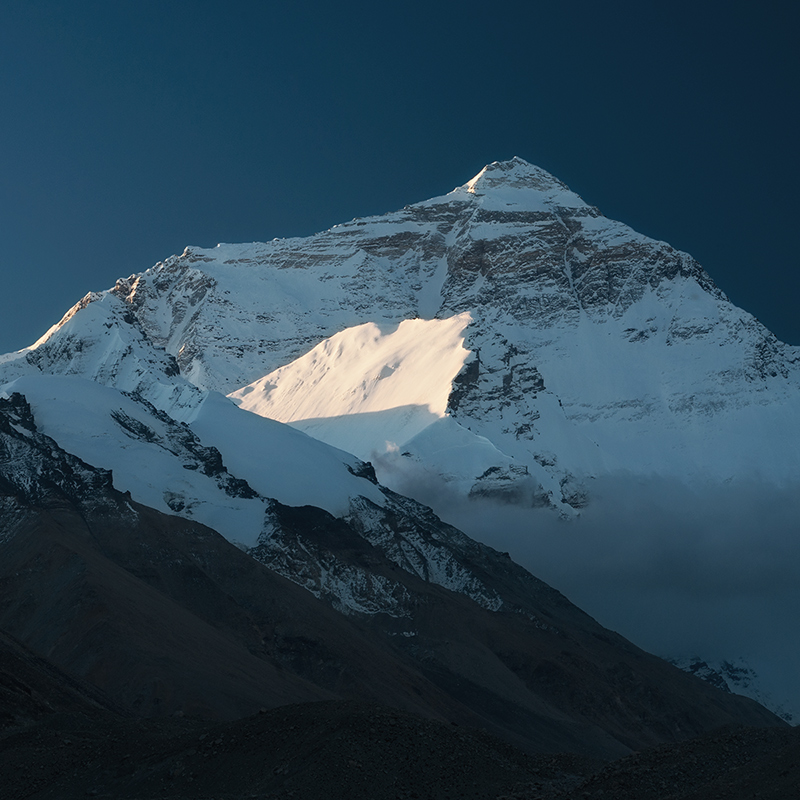
Everest's North Face

Ascents of Mount Everest by year

This is a list of notable expedition climbing attempts on Mount Everest. These mountaineering expeditions were for a variety of purposes, including geographic exploration, sport, science, awareness raising, and fundraising.

There have been many expeditions throughout the 20th (1900s) and 21st (2000s) centuries, with the amount increasing dramatically in the late 20th century before skyrocketing in the 2000s.

== Introduction ==
The early slowness of expedition frequency reflected the many difficulties of mounting one at that time, which included expense, travel by conventional means from distant Europe, language and culture barriers, the need to hire large numbers of native porters, access to the mountains (including permission of respective governments), extremely limited communications, and, simply, the unknown, as no-one had ever attempted to climb so high before.

Along with explorations of both poles, the challenge of reaching the highest point on the Earth spurred a late, great burst of effort to complete the Age of Discovery on Earth, with only the deep marine trenches remaining.

The first expedition was a reconnaissance in 1921, and after a few decades (heavily interrupted both by access problems and the Second World War), a 1953 British expedition reached the top of Everest. Early Everest expeditions had a reputation for grandiosity, both because they were such large undertakings and the character of the elite Europeans mounting them, with the 1953 expedition hiring 320 porters to carry supplies from Kathmandu across a remote, barely explored, wilderness. The 1963 American expedition had over 900 porters that carried over 25 tons of supplies, supporting a climbing crew of dozens. Over time the absolute size of expeditions shrank – in part thanks to helicopter deliveries of both supplies and personnel that began to occur late in the 20th century – but, with commercial expedition companies proliferating, the number of climbers in a party that may have begun with hundreds or even close to 1,000 members in all with only as few as two summiting shrank, while the number bidding to reach the top could swell into double-digits with a single outfitter's effort.

== List ==
=== Prior to 1960 ===
- 1921 British reconnaissance
- 1922 British
- 1924 British (included the Affair of the Dancing Lamas)
- 1933 British aerial reconnaissance
- 1933 British
- 1934 British
- 1935 British reconnaissance
- 1936 British
- 1938 British
- 1951 British reconnaissance
- 1952 Swiss
- 1953 British, first successful expedition
  - The ninth British expedition was led by John Hunt and organized and financed by the Joint Himalayan Committee. Using conventional open-circuit oxygen sets, the summit of Everest was reached at 11:30 a.m. local time on May 29, 1953, by the New Zealander Edmund Hillary and Tenzing Norgay, a Nepali, climbing the South Col route. This was the first time men had reached the top of Mount Everest.
- 1956 Swiss Expedition
  - The second Swiss expedition was led by Albert Eggler and the summit of Everest was reached on May 23, 1956, by four Swiss mountaineers, Ernst Schmied, Jürg Marmet, Dölf Reist, and Hansruedi von Gunten.

=== 1960s ===
- 1960 Chinese
- 1963 American First ascent by an American: Jim Whittaker, accompanied by Nawang Gombu Sherpa who later went on to become the first man to climb Everest twice in 1965; first ascent of the West Ridge on May 22 by Americans Tom Hornbein and Willi Unsoeld. Hornbein and Unsoeld descended by the South Col, making the ascent the first traverse of Everest. Lute Jerstad and Barry Bishop were the other summiteers. A total of six persons reached the summit, five Americans and one Sherpa
- 1965 Indian Everest Expedition

=== 1970s ===
- 1970 Japanese Alpine Club Mount Everest Expedition (1970 Mount Everest disaster)
- 1973 Italian Everest Expedition (I.E.E.)
- 1973 Japanese RCCII Everest Expedition
- 1975 Japanese Women's Everest Expedition
  - Junko Tabei: (Japan) became the first woman to reach the summit of Everest on 5/16/75 via the South-East Ridge route.
- 1975 Chinese Mount Everest expedition – North Col – North East Ridge
- 1975 British SW Face
- 1976 British and Nepalese Army expedition
- 1976 American Expedition – South East Ridge
- 1977 South Korean Expedition – South East Ridge
- 1978 Austrian Expedition – South East Ridge
- 1978 Franco-German Expedition headed by Karl Herrligkoffer
- 1979 Yugoslav Expedition along the West Ridge led by Tone Škarja
- 1979 German Expedition led by Gerhard Schmatz

=== 1980s ===
- 1980 Polish National Expedition – South East Ridge
- 1980 Japanese Alpine Club Expedition – North East Ridge
- 1980 Spanish Expedition – South East Ridge
- 1980 Reinhold Messner – Solo – North Col/North Face
  - First to ascend alone and without supplementary oxygen – from base camp to summit – during the monsoon. He established a new route on the North Face.
- 1981 American Medical Expedition – South Pillar/South East Ridge
- 1982 Russian Expedition – South West Pillar
- 1982 Canadian Mount Everest Expedition
- 1982 Japanese Japanese Winter Expedition – South East Ridge
- 1983 German/American Expedition – South East Ridge
- 1983 American Expedition – East Face/South East Ridge
- 1983 Japanese Sangak-udoshikai Expedition – South East Ridge
- 1983 Japanese Yeti Dojin Expedition – South East Ridge
- 1983 Japanese Kamoshika Dojin Expedition – South East Ridge
- 1984 Bulgarian Expedition by the West Ridge
- 1984 Indian Everest Expedition 1984
- 1984 Australian Expedition – North Face/Norton Couloir
- 1984 Slovak Expedition – South Pillar, but descending the South east ridge
- 1984 Czechoslovak Expedition by South Pillar
- 1984 American Expedition – North Col/North Face
- 1985 American Expedition – Lho La/West Ridge
- 1985 Norwegian Expedition – South East Ridge
- 1985 Spanish Segunda Expedición caja de Barcelona al Everest Expedition – North East Ridge
- 1985 Japanese Uemura Filming Expedition – South East Ridge
- 1986 Canadian Expedition – West Ridge (Tibet)
- 1986 Franco/Swiss Expedition – North Face/Hornbein Couloir
- 1987 South Korean Expedition – South East Ridge
- 1988 Joint China-Japan-Nepal Expedition
- 1988 American Expedition – East Face/South Col
- 1988 The Australian Bicentennial Everest Expedition
- 1988 French Expedition – South East Ridge
- 1988 South Korean Expedition – South Pillar
- 1988 Spanish Expedition – South East Ridge
- 1988 New Zealand Expedition led by Rob Hall – South East Ridge
- 1988 Czechoslovak Expedition by Southwest Face, repeating the route of 1975 British Expedition, Alpine style climbing without supplemental oxygen
- 1989 International Expedition – South East Ridge
- 1989 American Expedition – South East Ridge
- 1989 Polish Expedition – West Ridge/Hornbein Couloir
- 1989 Japanese Expedition – South East Ridge
- 1989 Mexican Expedition – South East Ridge
- 1989 South Korean Expedition – West Ridge (Nepal)

=== 1990s ===
- 1990 Royal Nepalese Army Expedition – South East Ridge
- 1990 Earth Day 20 International Peace Climb
- 1990 American Expedition – South East Ridge
- 1990 International Expedition – South East Ridge
- 1990 American commercial Expedition – South East Ridge
- 1990 French Commercial Expedition – South East Ridge
- 1990 French Expedition – South East Ridge
- 1990 South Korean/Japanese Expedition – South East Ridge
- 1990 Slovenian Expedition – South East Ridge
- 1991 Nepal Sherpa Youth Expedition – South East Ridge
- 1991 Sherpa Support/American Lhotse Expedition – South East Ridge
- 1991 American Expedition – South East Ridge
- 1991 Swedish Expedition – South East Ridge
- 1991 Italy/Czech Expedition – Norton
- 1991 International Expedition – North East Ridge
- 1991 Japanese Expedition – North East Ridge
- 1991 Spanish Valencian Ai Everest 91 Expedition – South East Ridge
- 1991 Russian – Of Friends and Romans: An Ascent of Everest Expedition – South East Ridge
- 1992 Indo-Tibetan Border Police Expedition to Mount Everest (Santosh Yadav became the second Indian woman to summit)
- 1992 First Indian Civilian Everest Expedition'1992 by Sports and Research Foundation, India
- 1992 Adventure Consultants New Zealand Expedition by Rob Hall – South East Ridge
- 1992 Dutch Expedition – South East Ridge
- 1992 Russian Mountain Climbers Sports Club VAZ Expedition – South East Ridge
- 1992 American Expedition – South East Ridge
- 1992 Chilean Sagarmtha Expedition – South East Ridge
- 1992 Spanish High Mountain Military Group Expedition – South East Ridge
- 1992 Chilean Chomolangma Kangshung Face Expedition – South East Ridge
- 1992 Spanish UDA 92 Expedition – South East Ridge
- 1992 Italian Mountain Equip Expedition – South East Ridge
- 1992 Luxembourg Fronco Expedition – South East Ridge
- 1992 German Expedition – South East Ridge
- 1992 International Expedition – South East Ridge
- 1992 Everest International Expedition – South East Ridge
- 1993 South Korean Expedition – North Col to South Col Traverse
- 1993 Nepalese Women San-Miguel Everest Expedition – South East Ridge
- 1993 Taiwan-Chinese Expedition – North Col – North East Ridge
- 1993 British Everest Expedition – South East Ridge
- 1993 American Alpine Ascent International Expedition – South East Ridge
- 1993 American Sagarmatha Expedition – South East Ridge
- 1993 Indo-Nepalese Everest Expedition led by Bachendri Pal – South East Ridge
  - Santosh Yadav became first woman to reach the top of Mount Everest twice
- 1993 Adventure Consultants New Zealand Hall & Ball Everest Expedition led by Rob Hall – South East Ridge
- 1993 Australian 40th Tashi Anniversary Expedition – South East Ridge
- 1993 Korean Women's Expedition – South East Ridge
- 1993 Lithuania Expedition – South East Ridge
- 1993 Russian Programma Piki Expedition – South East Ridge
- 1993 Korean Dongkuk Alpine Club Expedition – South East Ridge
- 1993 Spanish Everest Expedition – South East Ridge
- 1993 American Sagarmatha Expedition – South East Ridge
- 1993 Spanish Catalan Sagarmatha Cleaning & Climbing Expedition – South East Ridge
- 1993 USA Expedition – South East Ridge
- 1993 British Everest Expedition – South East Ridge
- 1993 Irish Everest Expedition – South East Ridge
- 1993 South Korean Everest Expedition – North Col – North East Ridge
- 1993 French Military Everest Lhotse Expedition Everest Expedition – South East Ridge
- 1993 Spanish Basque Everest Expedition – South East Ridge
- 1993 Himalayan Kingdoms Mt. Lhotse led by Stephen J. Bell – South East Ridge
- 1993 OTT Commercial Expedition led by Jon Tinker – North Col – North East Ridge
- 1993 Japan Gunma Winter Mt. Sagarmatha S.W.F. Expedition 93/94 – South East Ridge
- 1994 British Mount Everest Medical Expedition led by David Collier and Andrew Pollard as deputy leader.
- 1994 Japan University Expedition – South Pillar
- 1994 Taiwan Expedition – Std North up, Great Couloir Down
- 1994 Environmental Expedition led by Steve Goryl – South East Ridge
- 1994 Adventure Consultants expedition led by Rob Hall.
- 1994 Alpine Ascents International American Commercial Expedition led by Todd Burleson – South East Ridge
- 1994 International Mountain Guides (IMG) Expedition led by Eric Simonson – South East Ridge
- 1995 American Expedition led by Paul Pfau – North Col – North East Ridge
- 1995 Adventure Consultants expedition led by Rob Hall – South East Ridge
- 1995 Japanese Expedition – North East Ridge
- 1995 Russian Expedition – North Col – North East Ridge
- 1995 British Commercial Expedition – North Col – North East Ridge
- 1995 International Expedition – North Col – North East Ridge
- 1995 Taiwan Expedition – North Col – North East Ridge
- 1995 Brazil Himalayan Guides Expedition – North Col – North East Ridge
- 1995 OTT Expedition led by Jon Tinker – North Col – North East Ridge
- 1995 Latvia Expedition – North Col – North East Ridge
- 1995 Austrian Expedition – North Col – North East Ridge
- 1995 American On Sagarmatha Expedition – North Col – North East Ridge
- 1995 Condor Adventures Expedition – North Col – North East Ridge
- 1995 Commercial Expedition led by Russell Brice – North Col – North East Ridge
- 1995 South Korean Expedition – North Col – North East Ridge
- 1995 Korea Everest SW Face Expedition – SW Face
- Misc. teams of the 1996 Mount Everest disaster
- 1996 Taiwan Everest Expedition – South East Ridge
- 1996 Mountain Madness Sagarmatha Environmental Expedition led by Scott Fischer – South East Ridge (Guiding tragedy)
- 1996 Adventure Consultants International Friendship Everest Expedition led by Rob Hall – South East Ridge (Guiding tragedy)
- 1996 Indo-Tibetan Border Police expedition to Mount Everest led by Mohindenr Singh – North Col – North East Ridge
- 1996 Japanese Expedition – North Col – North East Ridge
- 1996 Norwegian Expedition – North Col – North East Ridge
- 1996 U K Expedition – North Col – North East Ridge
- 1996 Russian Expedition – North Col – North East Ridge
- 1996 Swedish Everest Expedition – South Pillar
- 1996 Imax Everest Filming Expedition led by David Breashears – South East Ridge
- 1996 First South African Everest Expedition led by Ian Woodall – South East Ridge
- 1996 Indonesia Everest Expedition led by Clara Sumarwati (first Indonesian woman to summit) – North East Ridge
- 1996 Korean Everest Expedition (Shoson University) – North East Ridge
- 1999 Mallory and Irvine Research Expedition

=== 2000s ===
- 2000 Nepali Women Millennium Expedition
- 2001 Mallory and Irvine Research Expedition
- 2004 Greek Expedition
- 2004 Discovery Channel Expedition
- 2004 Connecticut Everest Expedition
- 2006 Turkish Everest Expedition
- 2006 EverestMax
- 2006 David Sharp with Asian Trekking
- 2006 BSF Everest Expedition
- 2006 Philippine Mount Everest Expedition via the South East Ridge
- 2007 Altitude Everest expedition
- 2007 Indian Army Everest Expedition
- 2008 Eco Everest Expeditions
- 2009 Western Washington University science expedition

=== 2010s ===
- 2010 TOPtoTOP Global Climate Expedition
- 2013 50th Anniversary North Face-National Geographic Expeditions
- 2017 ONGC Everest Expedition
- 2017 Indian Navy Everest Expedition
- 2018 Ben Fogle and Victoria Pendleton's in support of The British Red Cross and the 'Anything is Possible' initiative.
- 2019 Western Washington University with J. All science expedition

=== 2020s ===
- 2020 Chinese expedition (only Chinese climbers would be permitted on Everest in the spring season).

== See also ==
- Timeline of Mount Everest expeditions
- List of Mount Everest records
- List of Mount Everest summiters by frequency
- List of 20th-century summiters of Mount Everest
