= Pagretar =

Pagretar कोठे पाङ्गरेटार
- Village development committee
- Location in Nepal
- Coordinates: 27.75°N 85.85°E
- Country: Nepal
- Zone: Bagmati Zone
- District: Sindhupalchowk District

Population (2011)
  - Total: 2,952
  - Religions: Hindu
- Time zone: UTC+5:45 (Nepal Time)

Pagretar is a village development committee in Sindhupalchowk District in the Bagmati Zone of central Nepal. Kothe is a populated location within the committee area. In 1991, there were 633 houses, and at the time of the 2001 Nepal census Pagretar had a population of 3,352. By 2011, the population had become 2,952 (1,524 females and 1,428 males) in 762 households.
