= 5th Battalion, 4th Gorkha Rifles =

Infantry battalion of the Indian Army

5th Battalion the 4th Gorkha Rifles
- Active: 1963 – Present
- Country: India
- Allegiance: Indian Army
- Branch: 4 Gorkha Rifles
- Type: Infantry (Rifles)
- Role: Light Infantry
- Size: Six companies, including support and administration. Approximately 800 all ranks.
- Regimental Centre: Subathu, Himachal Pradesh
- Nickname: Kanchhi
- Motto: Kafar Hunu Bhanda Marnu Ramro (Better to die than live like a coward)
- Anniversaries: 1 January, Raising Day. 11 March, Regimental Day
- Engagements: Anula-Bajragrahi, Sialkot, Pakistan
- Battle honours: Theatre Honour Sialkot Punjab 1965

Commanders
- Colonel of the Regiment: Lt Gen CA Krishnan, AVSM

Insignia
- Regimental Insignia: A pair of crossed Khukris with the Roman numeral IV below, and Ashoka on top.

The 5th Battalion the 4th Gorkha Rifles, is an infantry battalion of the 4 Gorkha Rifles (4 GR), a Rifle regiment of the Indian Army. The 5th Battalion the 4th Gorkha Rifles (GR), was raised in January 1963, in the wake of the Chinese Offensive, in Arunachal Pradesh, and Ladakh, India, from bases in Tibet, in 1962.

== Raising ==
The 4th Gorkha Rifles has five battalions. The 5th Battalion the 4th Gorkha Rifles (abbreviated as 5/4 GR), was raised on 1 January 1963, at Ambala Cantonment, Haryana, the sprawling cantonment town, north of Delhi. The first Commanding officer of the battalion was Lt Colonel Ranjit Singh Chandel, formerly of the 1st Battalion the 4th Gorkha Rifles(1/4 GR). He assumed command of the battalion on 1 February 1963.

The officers who joined the battalion on its raising at Ambala were: Major R K Malgwa, Second in Command, Major Aman Singh Ahalawat, Company Commander, Major Prem K Gupta, Company Commander, Lieutenant K P Choudhary, Adjutant, and Subedar-Major Shree Prashad Gurung.

== Names and spelling ==
Within the regiment, 5/4 GR is often referred simply as 5/4, or 'five phor', or the Fifth Battalion, and, as the youngest of the five battalions of the regiment, it is affectionately called (Kanchhi). '4GR', in black metal, is worn as regimental signage on the shoulder straps by all ranks. The official, and correct, spelling of 'gorkha', since February 1949, is Gorkha, and not Goorkha, Goorkah, or Gurkha, as the British and Tata motors still choose to spell it, or Ghurka, as the American retailer of luxury leather bags and 'fine men's accessories' has, profitably, chosen to spell it.

== Bakloh ==
In early 1963, the still-forming 5/4 GR, moved by rail from Ambala, to Bakloh, District Pathankot, Punjab (district Chamba in the state of Himachal Pradesh, after Reorganization of Punjab in 1966).

Bakloh was chosen to raise the battalion, by Lt Gen Motisagar, the then Chief of General Staff and Colonel of the Regiment, and senior officer of the regiment, because of its excellent training facilities, temperate weather, but most of all because of Bakloh's legacy relations with the regiment spanning over a century. After the First Battalion arrived in Bakloh, in 1866, the Second, Third, and Fourth Battalion of the regiment were raised in Bakloh.

Bakloh had been home of the 4 GR from 1866, till the 4 GR Regimental Centre was moved following the partition of India, to Dharamshala, then Chakrata, and finally to Sabathu, to be amalgamated with the 1st GR Centre, to form the 14 Gorkha Training Centre (GTC).

To mitigate the loss of Bakloh as a Regimental Station, the Army Headquarters, at the regiment's bidding, had informally agreed to periodically post one of the regiments battalions to Bakloh, to sustain the Regimental legacy relationship with Bakloh. This arrangement was subsequently formalised by classifying Bakloh as an 'asterisk' station for the regiment. This meant that the regiment had priority claim to having one of its battalion located in Bakloh, preferably in the prestigious 1/4 Lines.

In the decades since 5/4 GR first arrived in Bakloh, in 1963, Bakloh has lost its sheen, and the officer and the men of the regiment appear no longer as keen on Bakloh as they were in the fifties. They complain that it is on a limb, and small and boring. As a result of the constant gripe against Bakloh, it has lost its 'asterisk' status. This is a cause of big disappointment for the 4 GR pensioners in Bakloh. Many older officers, Junior Commissioned Officers(JCOs), and men, especially those who started their regimental careers in Bakloh, are unaffected by those who grumble about Bakloh, and remain fond and attachment to Bakloh; and committed to the idea that Bakloh should have a Battalion from the regiment to sustain the Bakloh legacy and take care of the regimental properties, remains, and the sizeable population of regiment's pensioners, and widows.

=== Arrival ===
The battalion's arrival in Bakloh in 1963 was big, much-awaited event, to which the town had long been looking forward to. The entire cantonment – pensioners, women, girls, children, shop-owners from the 1/4 bazaar, cantonment board employees – lined up along the road and the parade ground to greet, cheer and wave as the convoy carrying the battalion heaved into Bakloh.

=== Officer's mess ===
In the centre of the Bakloh ridge, not far from St Oswald Church, is the old officer's mess, a low, modest stone structure, with a view of the plains, and on clear sunny days of the River Ravi as makes its way into Pakistan. In 1963, the mess was empty. It contents, the remains of the Raj and the regiment, of mess silver, battlefield memorabilia, war trophies, billiards table, leather sofas, pieces of art, Persian rugs, hunting trophies of skins and horns, scores of old albums, and thousands of books, made famous by evocative description by John Masters in the Bugles and A Tiger, had been crated off to Sabathu, following the move of the 4 GR Centre to Sabathu.

The regiment was particularly lucky in being able to retain the pre-1947 regimental remains, which were handed over 'intact' by the departing British officers, to the new legatees of the regiment, unlike the departing British officers of the 3rd Gorkha Rifles, 5th Gorkha Rifles, 8th Gorkha Rifles, and 9 Gorkha Rifles, who instead of handing over the regimental properties 'intact' vandalised the mess property, stole mess silver, and carted off the most valuable mess assets to the UK., only to return some of them decades later, and that, too, after some coaxing. Brigadier Osborne Hedley, British Army, formerly 5 GR, has recorded that " The 4 GR was alright, 3rd and 8 bad" and that in 5 GR Regimental Centre, " the mess had been practically stripped of furniture, silver, crockery, and cutlery". In 9 GR, it seems, it was even worse. Maj General Palit, who took over from the departing British officers later wrote that in 3/9 GR 'cutlery and whiskey bottles were smashed' and that "All our mess silver had been either appropriated by individuals or given away to British regiments".

In 1963 the big challenge for 'Kanchhi' was how to deal with the empty glazed verandah, with the much-touted view of the plains, the cozy living room, the not so cozy dining room, the low detached billiards room, and the bare walls of this venerable building which had served for almost a century as a museum and mess for the regiment.

=== Subalterns ===
In Bakloh the battalion had 16 Subalterns. Thirteen joined in 1964. Their overseer, as the senior subaltern, was the handsome, affable, and popular Virendra K Dhawan, who loved three X rum, crumbling roller cigarettes, and KL Seghal's melancholy melodies. On 6 April 2011, a year before the Golden jubilee, to the regret of legions of friends and admirers, Virendra died.

The thirteen subalterns, commissioned in the wake of the 1962 War, who joined in Bakloh, and were destined to be the vanguard in the 1965 war were: R L Bhanot, V K Dhawan, S P Mishra, Anup S Rawat, SVS Tyagi, Prem S Saraswat, Verma, Baldev K Chatli, R Rajendran, B S Khattri, Satinder Pal, Sachdev and John Taylor.

=== Bungalow number 5 ===
Bungalow number 5 is the austere two-storied stone building of small comfort which has been the traditional home of Bakloh bachelors. This is also the first big Bungalow that one sees on the promontory that dominates the parade ground, and office complex, as the daily bus from Pathankot trundles into Bukloh and makes its final stop at the corner of the parade ground. To this building which at the best of times had housed no more than three or four officers, almost a dozen young officers were assigned, some thought consigned.

=== Visits ===
In 1964 Lt Gen Henderson Brooks, General Officer Commanding (GOC) XI Corps, and the co-author of the controversial, and the still-secret Henderson Brooks–Bhagat Report on the 1962 war, was the first senior officer to visit the Battalion.

== Samba ==
In December 1964, the battalion moved from Bukloh to Samba, Jammu and Kashmir. In Samba, Lt Colonel Vasant B Sathe, 2nd Joint Services Wing (JSW) Course, formerly of the Second Battalion the 4th Gorkha Rifles, succeeded Lt Colonel Ranjit Singh, as the Commanding Officer.

== 1965 War ==
The 1965 war, which consisted of three Pakistan offensives, and one Indian counteroffensive, began in Jan 1965, with the occupation of a large swathe of the territory in the North of the Rann of Kutch, by Pakistan Para-Military Units, in an area under the operational jurisdiction of somnolent elements of the Gujarat Reserve Police, under the command and control of Indian Ministry of Home Affairs. The India response to the occupation, first by the Gujarat police, then the CRPF, and later by Indian army units, was late, limited, and timorous. It was contested aggressively, by 8 Infantry division of the Pakistan Army under the command of Maj General Tikka Khan. In April 65, in a succession of operations code-named Desert Hawk Pakistan army consolidated and expanded its gains. In response to the Pakistan incursions and occupations, the Indian army along the entire India-Pakistan border was placed on alert, and formation and units were deployed to their operational location. In April 1965, the 5/4 GR, moved from Samba to its operational location. All persons on leave were recalled, and leave stopped.

Encouraged by the easy success in the Rann of Kutch, on 5 August 65 Pakistan launched Operation Gibraltar, the invasion of Jammu and Kashmir, by a 'guerrilla' force of some 30,000 men in mufti, led by regular army personnel. In response to Operation Gibraltar, 5/4 GR for much of August 65 was deployed on counter-infiltration tasks.

On 1 September 65, Pakistan, in support of Operation Gibraltar, launched Operation Grand Slam, an armour led invasion in the Chhamb and Akhnur sector aimed at cutting off J and K. Grand Slam provoked the Indian counteroffensive. 5/4 GR participated as leading component of the Counter-Offensive.

=== 1 Corps ===
The Order of Battle (Orbat) of 1 Corps, Headquarters Kaluchak, raised in May 65 as India's first strike corps by Lt Gen Patrick Dunn of 3rd Gorkha Rifles, included 1 Armoured Division, the 6th, 14th, and 26th Infantry Divisions. On 4 September 1965 1 Corps formations and units were concentrated between rivers Ravi and Chenab, for an offensive in the Sialkot Sector.

=== 26 Infantry Division ===
26 Infantry Division, commanded by Major General ML Thapan, had four brigades, including 162 Infantry Brigade and 168 Infantry Brigade. 26 Infantry Division, in Phase III of the Corps Plan, was to secure the northern flank for the Armored Division break-out battle and contain Pakistan forces in Sailkot. Divisional outline Plan in Phase 1 was to capture Uche Wains NW 8228 and Niche Wains NW 8128, with 162 Infantry Brigade (Brigadier R.S. Sheoran), and Anula NW 879, and Bajragarhi, with 168 Infantry Brigade. The H Hour was 2330 hours, 8 September 1965.

=== 168 Infantry Brigade ===
168 Infantry Brigade( Brigadier Pran K Luthera) included 2/1 GR, 8 Jammu and Kashmir Rifles (8 JAK RIF), 5/4 GR, A Squadron, 18 Cavalry(Shermans), and 168 Field Regiment in direct support. 168 Infantry Brigade plan was to attack in two phases: Phase 1 capture Anula. south of Aik Nallah, and in Phase 2 capture Bajragarhi. The "bridgehead across the international Border" was to serve as spring board for launching India's main strike element, 1 Armoured Division, concentrated in Ramgarh.

=== 5/4 GR ===
5/4 GR, in Phase 1 of the 168 Infantry Brigade attack, was tasked to capture 'high ground' north of village Anula, East of Bajragarhi, on the Sailkot-Phagowal Road, in the Sailkot Sector. At 2300 hours, on night 7/8 September, as leading troops of Operation code named Nepal, 5/4 crossed the international border, as Phase I of the Brigade attack.

==== Anula assault ====
The Battalion Forming up Place(FUP) was secured and marked by C Company, under Major HC Singh. Just before the H Hour it was realized by Lieutenant Ashok Nagpaul, the battalion intelligence officer, that the FUP was misaligned. Sathe, the commanding officer, who had located himself in the centre of the two assaulting Rifle Companies, on learning that there was a mistake in the marking of the FUP, coolly and without causing a flap had the FUP marking corrected. The assault was conducted by A and D Rifle companies under the command of Captain Subash C Jolly and Maj Hem Chander Tiwari respectively. Before the assault Sathe shook hands with the two company commanders and wished them victory. The battalion advancing through sugar cane fields secured Anula by first light 8 September against 'comparatively light' opposition, according to the Ministry of Defense, History of the war, published 27 years later. The defenders, consisting mainly of Pakistan para-military troops, prompted by the din of war and the impending assault, abandoned their position before the assault reached their position. Anula and Bajragarhi were captured by 0539 hours 8 September 65. Soon after Anula was captured Sathe reached the objective. He first visited A Company, and then D Company, where he was wounded by own artillery fire.

==== Fog of war casualties ====
Following the capture of Anula, in the 'reorganization' phase of the attack, as the support weapons were being moved into place, and the rear echelons had started to arrive, the battalion came under intense uninterrupted artillery fire. The fire was accurate and deadly. It lasted for some fifteen minutes. The artillery fire, as it soon became clear, was from own field artillery fire; and was a horrible mistake. It was meant to support the second phase of the 168 Brigade attack, the capture of Bajragarhi by 2/1 GR. By the time the fire was lifted 8 men were dead and 17 wounded. Amongst the wounded was Lieutenant Colonel Vasant B Sathe, the Commanding Officer. After he was hit in the ankle and the hip by shrapnel, Sathe winced and was heard saying " I think I've been hit by a stone" by John Taylor, and Hem Tiwari, who were 'lying head to head' with him while the shelling rained down. After the shelling lifted it was realised that Sathe had been hit. But Sathe, though wounded and bleeding, continued to command, firmly rejecting all attempts to evacuate him till Major BB Sharma, the Second in Command, was able to reach and assume command.

==== Defended areas ====
In the days following the high collateral casualties, on account of the 'fog of war', the battalion relieved 2/1 GR in Bajragarhi. As the 1 Corps offensive petered out, the battalion occupied defensive positions, along the Aik Nallah Raja-Harpal, close to the Railway line to Sialkot, and the Phagowal area, in the face of Pakistan Air Force strafing and bombing runs.

==== Patrol clash in Bajragrahi ====
In Bajragarhi, Lieutenant Bhupinder Singh Khatri, while leading a patrol west of Aik Nallah, in Karupl, was seriously wounded in the stomach by Pakistani Medium Machine Gun fire. The patrol, still under sustained fire, evacuated Lieutenant Khatri across the Aik Nallah, to the Brigade Advanced Dressing Station, where he received medical aid superintended by Captain Rajput, the battalion Regimental Medical Officer(RMO), before being evacuated to the Military Hospital in Jammu for surgical care. The rapid evacuation, and early and expert medical attention, saved Lieutenant Khatri's life. Lt Khatri, who retired as Colonel, in April 1992, was elected President of All India Gorkha ExServicemen Welfare Association(AIGEWA), Dehradun, for a term of five years. He is the first 4 GR officer to be elected as head of the AIGWE.

=== Ceasefire ===
In the wake of Operation Grand Slam, the UN Security Council adopted three UN Security Council(SC) resolutions 209, 210, and 211 which called on the two sides to stop fighting and withdraw to "the positions held by them before 5 August 1965". After the first two UNSC resolutions went unheeded, U Thant, the UN Secretary-General, travelled to India and Pakistan from 7–16 September, 65, to urge the two countries to stop the fighting. Following these unsuccessful 'appeals', by the UN Secretary-General, the United Nations Security Council on 20 September 65, adopted Resolution 211, which, instead of calling on the two sides, demanded " that a cease-fire should take effect on Wednesday, 22 September 1965, at 0700 hours GMT" and that the two Governments issue orders for the "withdrawal of all armed personnel to the positions held by them before 5 August 1965" . After some dithering the two sides agreed to cease fire with effect from 2200 hours, GMT, 22 September.

On 22 September 1965, at 1410, Indian Standard Time (IST), the Indian Army headquarters informed all its formations to cease-fire with effect from 0330 hours, IST, 23 September 1965. The 'Ceasefire' not always honored, found the battalion in trenches, in eyeball to eyeball contact with Pakistani Forward Defended Localities (FDLs), along the Sialkot Railway line. In some areas, the FDLs were a mere 20 meters apart, and C Company could hear Pakistan soldiers talking, and even smoking the hookah in their trenches and bunkers.

=== Breaches of cease fire (23 September 1965 – 9 January 1966) ===
To monitor the ceasefire, the UN created a new mission called United Nations India-Pakistan Observation Mission (UNIPOM) to "supervise the cease-fire along the India-Pakistan border except in the State of Jammu and Kashmir," and to "observe and report on breaches of the ceasefire' to the security council. UNIPOM was in addition to the existing United Nations Military Observer Group in India and Pakistan (UNMOGIP) deployed in Jammu and Kashmir.

Despite the presence of the UNIPOM's 14 field stations, and over 90 observers, the Ceasefire was not always honoured. There were flagrant, breaches of the Ceasefire agreement by both sides. On 27 September 1965, the UN Security Council adopted resolution 214 which while expressing its 'grave concern' recorded that " the cease-fire agreed to unconditionally by the Governments of India and Pakistan is not holding". It demanded that "the parties urgently honor their commitment to the Council to observe the cease-fire". This was followed on 5 November 1965, by resolution 215, which demanded: "that representatives of India and Pakistan meet with a representative of the Secretary-General to purpose schedules for the withdrawals."

=== Disengagement and withdrawal (10 January – 25 February 66) ===
On 10 January 1966 India and Pakistan signed the Tashkent agreement, which provided for the 'disengagement and withdrawal' of forces by the two sides to positions held prior to 5 August 1965, by 25 February 1966. Following the Tashkent Agreement the military commanders of India and Pakistan met in Delhi, facilitated by Brigadier-General Tulio Marambio (Chile), the Secretary-General's representative, on 22 and 25 January and finalised implementation plans for the 'disengagement and withdrawal'. The 'disengagement and withdrawal' was implemented in two phases, overseen by UNOGIP, in J and K sector, and by the UNIPOM in the Sialkot and other areas. In phase one, the two sides 'disengaged' by withdrawing 1,000 yards from the line of 'actual control. In phase two mines were lifted, and defence works dismantled.

On 25 February 1966, the'disengagement and withdrawal' to positions held on 5 August 65 was completed. On 22 March 1966 UNIPOM was terminated, and all its observers withdrew.

By end of February 1966, the battalion returned to its prewar location. In early March 1966, the ban on leave, imposed in April 1965, was lifted.

== Ferozpur ==
From J and K, the battalion moved to Ferozpur, a peace station, to form part of 48 Infantry Brigade, of 7 Infantry Division. In Ferozpur cantonment, the battalion's responsibilities included the construction, maintenance, and siting of defence systems in the Khem Karan sector. The Khemkaran defence sub-system, was part of the larger system of 'Ditch cum Bunds', bunkers, anti-tank ditches, command posts, weapon emplacements, pillboxes, and defence works, between the rivers Beas and Sutlej. The construction of this vast system of interlocked defence works, which stretched across almost the entire Punjab border, was headed by Lt Gen PS Bhagat, VC, GOC XI Corps, in Jalandhar. The aim of this long, linear, elaborate, ambitious, anti-tank obstacle, quite without precedence in the annals of Indian military history, and as extensive and expensive as the Maginot Line, was to deter and defeat Pakistani armour invasion like the one it attempted in 1965.

== Battle honours, and citations ==
The battalion for its role in the 1965 war was awarded the Theatre Honour Sialkot Punjab 1965. In 1992, it became one of the first Infantry units of the Indian Army to receive the Chief of Army Staff's(COAS) Citation, abbreviated as 'COAS Citation', for sustained good performance and successful action against infiltrators and terrorists in J & K. On 27 February 2008, the battalion was awarded the 'Eastern Command Unit Citation' by the General Officer Commanding in Chief Eastern Command for outstanding performance.

== Awards and achievements ==
=== Mountaineering ===
Havildar Mingmar Sherpa, who had trained and hoped since 2001 to climb Mount Everest, was shortlisted in 2006, to form part of Indian Army Everest Expedition 2007 which had planned to climb Everest from the North Face. In March 2007, after protracted and tough vetting, Mingmar was selected as a member of the Indian Army Everest Expedition 2007, that consisted of 3 officers 4 JCOs and 13 other ranks(ORs). The 20 member team, which was divided into 14 climbers, and 6 support staff, reached Kathmandu on 28 March 2007. After a short stop for checking equipment and 'marrying up' with Sherpas, the team left Kathmandu for Lhasa, Tibet, where it arrived on 31 March 2007. The team left Lhasa by road Gyatse- Shigatse- Tingri for base camp where it arrived on 2 April 2007. The advance base camp at 21,000 feet was established on 17 April. On 28 April, 16 members of the team moved to Camp 1 at 23,000 feet. On 13 May 2007, Mingmar's group of six other ranks (ORs), reached Camp 1. The first group, comprising 1 officer, 1 JCO, and 4 ORs climbed Everest on 15 May 2007. The second group, which was led by a havildar, included Mingmar. The second group started the ascent from Camp III on 15 May 2007, at 2200 hours, and reached the Mount Everest, 29,029 feet, at 06:15 AM 16 May 2007. For his achievement he was awarded the Sena medal. In 2008, he scaled Mount Stok, 20,200 feet, and Gulap Kangri, 19,729 feet, as a member of the Indo Sri Lanka Army Expedition. The twin peaks of Mount Stok Kangri and Mount Gulap Kangri, in Ladakh, India, were climbed from 3 – 6 Oct 2008. For this achievement, he was awarded a bar to the Sena medal in 2009.

=== Boxing ===
Havildar Dhan Bahadur Gurung, won the bronze medal for boxing in the Light Heavyweight category in 10th Asian Games held in Seoul, South Korea, from 20 September 1986 to 5 October 1986.

=== Band ===
In 1995, the battalion's Pipe and Drum band was adjudged as the best band in the army during the Republic day Celebrations. The battalion has established a record of sorts by winning the Eastern Command band competition seven times.

== Jubilees ==
=== Silver ===
In 1988, the battalion celebrated its Silver Jubilee in Naraina, Delhi Cantonment. The celebration was attended by a large number of Bhuros (elders, also old retirees) from Nepal and India. Amongst the attendees were Lt Col Ranjit Singh, the first CO, and the much admired and respected first SM and Honorary Captain Damar Singh, and SM and Honorary Captain Rudraman Gurung.

=== Golden ===
On 19–21 October 2012, the battalion, celebrated its Golden Jubilee, in Gandhinagar, Gujarat. The Golden Jubilee program included: Wreath Laying by Rifleman Kaman Gurung, the junior-most Rifleman of the battalion, Guard of Honor, the release of First Day Cover by the Colonel of the regiment, Sainik Sammelan ( literally a conclave of soldiers: in practice a formal gathering, in spruced up uniforms, in which everyone sits in arrays, according to rank, and at which the senior-most officer present makes, usually, a brief speech, with some exhortation), Golden Jubilee Dinner, and Golden Jubilee Cultural Evening and Barakhana (literally, a big, semi-formal communal feast, with some dancing, singing, and music, in which all ranks participate, but eat at separate tables), on 20 October.

To commemorate the Golden Jubilee, serving officers, serving flag officers, retired officers of the battalion, and serving and retired JCOs presented silver trophies to the Officers Mess and the JCO's Club respectively. The veteran officers of the battalion, who now number over seventy, contributed between Rupees 10,000 to 15,000 each, towards a Veterans silver trophy, a Silver Scroll Roll Call, that bears the names of all retired officers who served with the battalion since its raising. The veteran's trophy was 'unveiled' during the Golden Jubilee Dinner by Maj General V Rajaram, VSM, Retired, and Brigadier Jayant Pawar, Retired, former Commanding Officers of the Fifth Battalion, and formerly of the Third Battalion. The trophy presented by the battalion's JCO's was 'unveiled' by veteran Subedar Major and Honorary Captain Birdhoj Gurung.

The Jubilee was presided over by Major General Parthasarathi Paul, VSM, the first officer commissioned in the battalion to be elected as the Colonel of the Regiment, an important milestone for the battalion. Over 200 Bhu Puus (bhut purva or former, an affectionate colloquial in Nepali language for Ex Servicemen), attended the jubilee with their wives, children, and grandchildren. More Bhuros came for the Golden Jubilee than had come for the Silver Jubilee. They came from all over India and Nepal. The larger contingents came from Pokhara, in Nepal, Bukloh, and Dharamshala, in Himachal Pradesh, Dehradun, in Uttarakhand, Darjeeling, in West Bengal and Noida, in UP.

The officers who were with the battalion at the time of the raising who came included Prem K Gupta, Ram L Bhanot, S P Mishra, Baldev K Chatli, Bhupender S Khattri, Satinder Pal, and John Taylor. Also present were Lt Colonel Ranjit Singh's son, and his grandson, who is a company commander in the battalion. The prominent Bhu Puus, from the 1960s, who came, included Ex Havildar Narendra Thapa, Subedar Major (SM) Lal Bahadur Chhantyal, SM Birendra Kumar Gurung, SM and Honorary Captains Sukh Ram Thapa, Gian Darshan S Thapa, and Bir Dhoj Gurung. Those who were expected, and wanted very much to come, but were unable to come because of age, were SM and Honorary Captains Damar Singh, and Rudraman Gurung, who were missed, and much remembered.

== See also ==
- Bakloh
- Gurkhas
- Gorkha Regiments of the Indian Army
- 4 Gorkha Rifles
