= Fixed rope =

Technique in mountaineering

Examples of fixed rope climbing

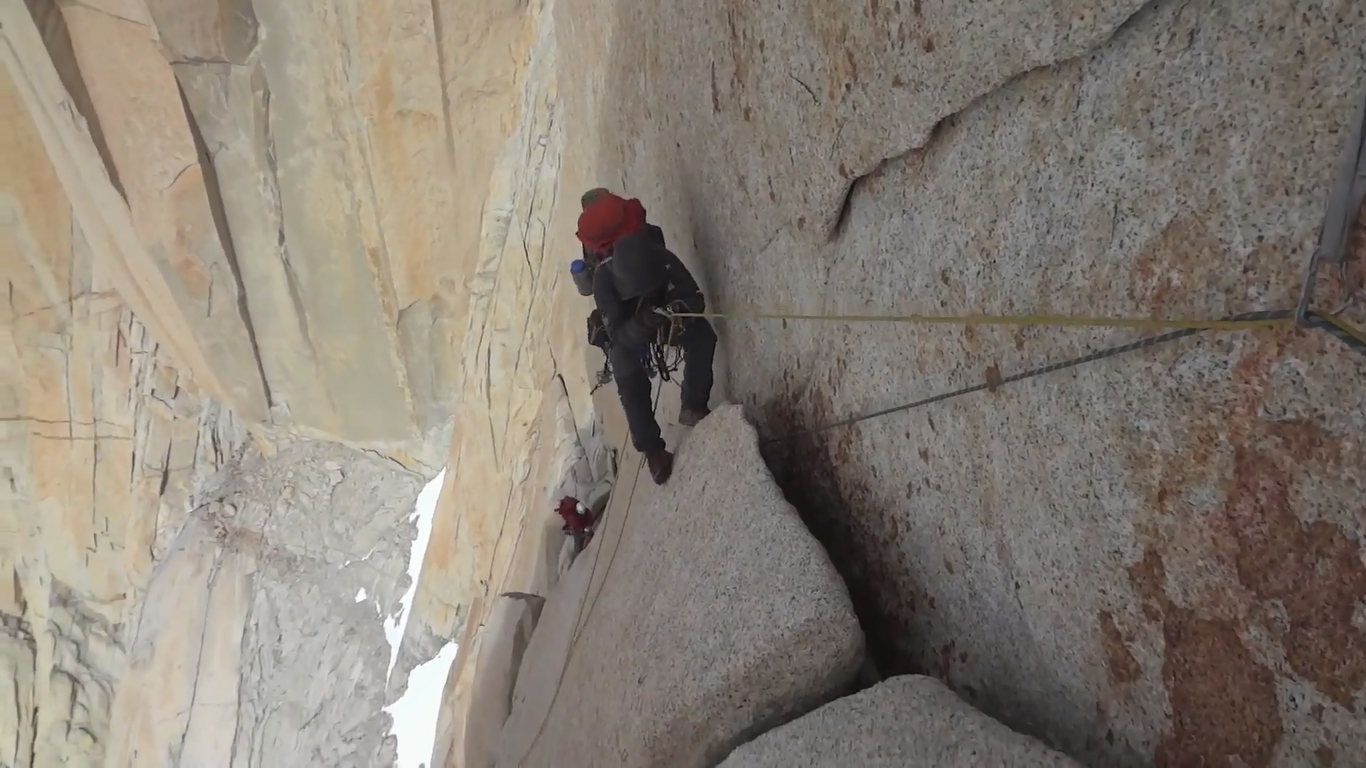
Fitz Roy

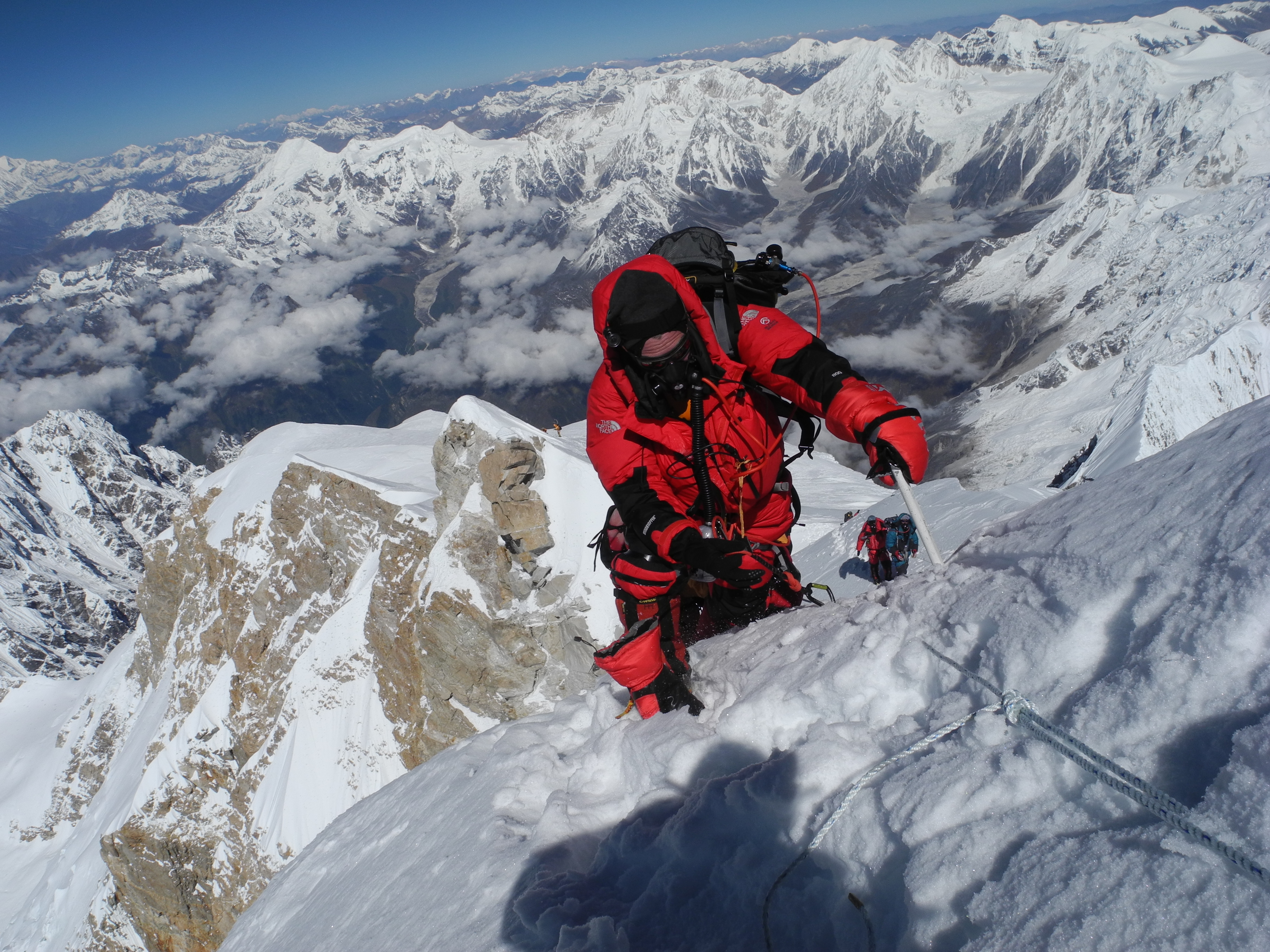
Manaslu

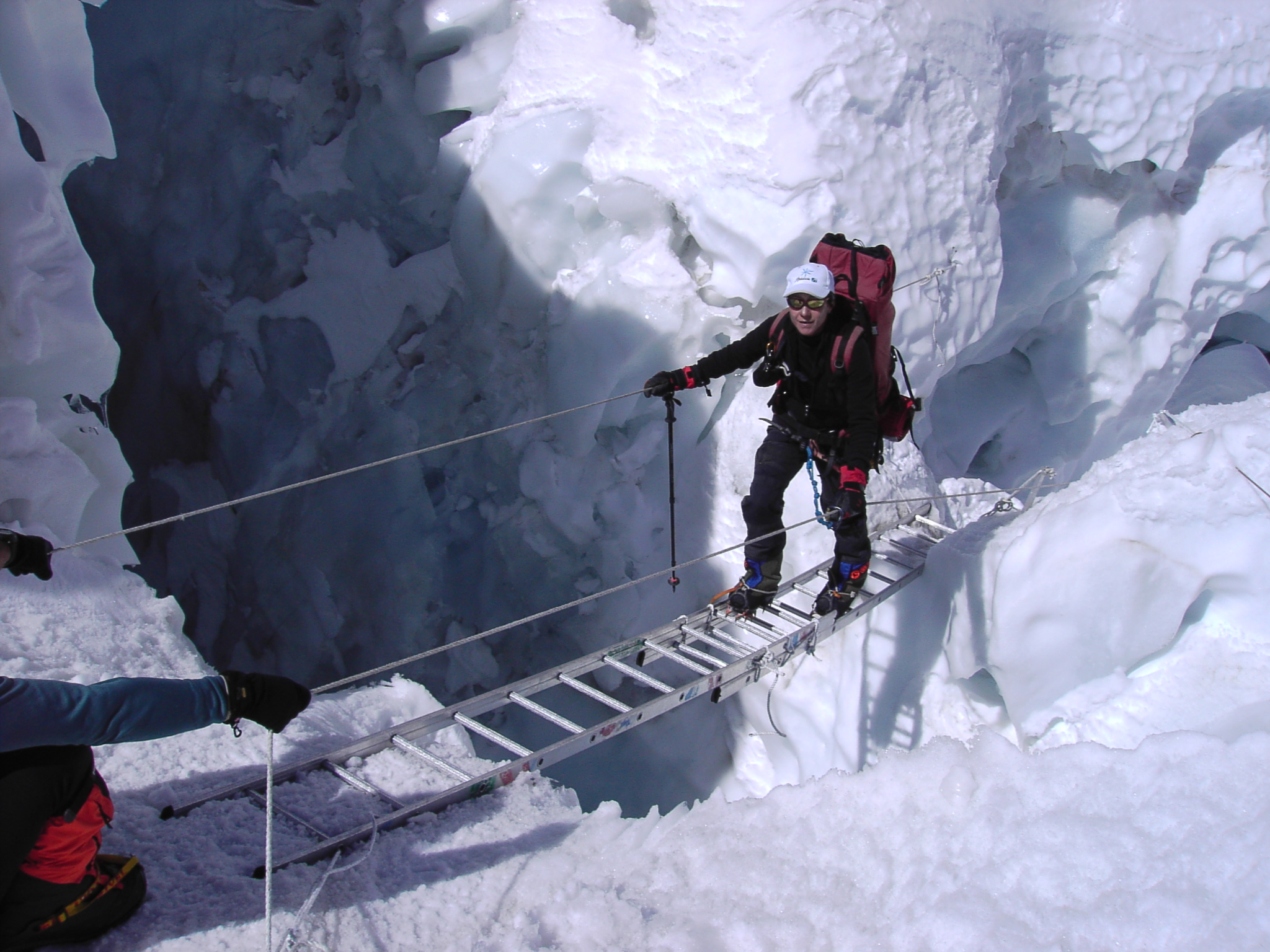
Khumbu Icefall

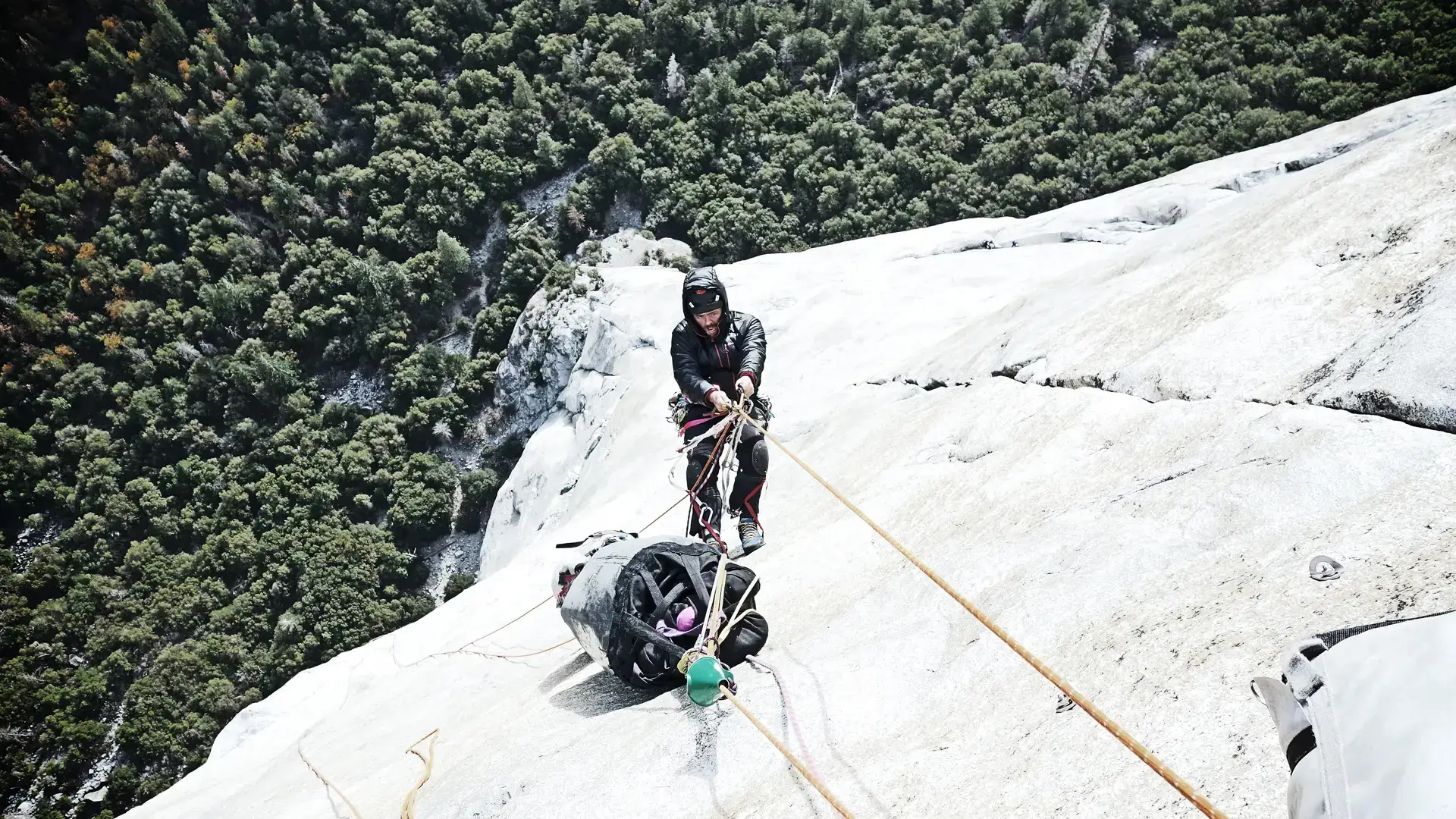
El Capitan

In climbing and mountaineering, a fixed rope (or fixed line) is the practice of installing networks of in-situ anchored static climbing ropes on climbing routes to assist any following climbers (and porters) to ascend more rapidly—and with less effort—by using mechanical aid devices called ascenders. Fixed ropes also allow climbers (and porters) to descend rapidly using mechanical devices called descenders. Fixed ropes also help to identify the line of the climbing route in periods of low visibility (e.g. a storm or white-out). The act of ascending a fixed rope is also called jumaring, which is the name of a type of ascender device, or also called jugging in the US.

Fixed ropes are put in place by the lead climbers, and the ropes may or may not be removed as the climbers descend after completing the route. For popular Himalayan climbing routes, extensive networks of fixed ropes may be put in place to last the entire climbing season (e.g. the Khumbu Icefall on Mount Everest). While storms can strip a mountain of fixed ropes that have been left behind, the existence of old—and often unreliable and dangerous—fixed ropes along popular climbing routes, is a concern in climbing. On popular European, and latterly American, climbing routes, the fixed rope can be replaced by networks of permanently anchored metal cables, which are called 'via ferrata' routes.

Fixed ropes are not used in 'alpine style' mountaineering as they are considered akin to a form of aid climbing. Fixed ropes are commonly used on big wall climbing routes where it is common for the non-lead climber(s) to jumar up on fixed ropes to save time and conserve effort; the re-belay technique is often used on big walls to reduce wear on fixed ropes. Guided climbing expeditions to Himalayan peaks such as the easier eight-thousanders, often set up extensive networks of fixed ropes on steep or icy sections of the climbing route to help their less experienced clients, and to allow their porters and sherpas move quickly along the route. For example, on the Hillary Step of Everest, networks of fixed ropes improve client safety, but then cause bottlenecks at altitudes in the death zone. The ethics on the use of extensive fixed rope networks by commercial adventure companies facilitating access to dangerous eight-thousander summits for weaker climbers is a source of debate in mountaineering.

== See also ==
- Ascender
- Expedition climbing
- Self rescue (climbing)
- Tyrolean traverse
