= Robert Benedict Bourdillon =

British WWI pilot and medical researcher (1889–1971)

- R. B. Bourdillon in World War I military uniform
- Born: 8 September 1889; Easebourne, Midhurst, Sussex, England
- Died: 3 March 1971 (aged 81); Ganges, British Columbia, Canada
- Education: Balliol College, Oxford
- Known for: Vitamin D research
- Awards: Military Cross, Air Force Cross, Commander of the Order of the British Empire
- Scientific career
- Fields: Medicine, chemistry
- Workplaces: Intelligence Corps, Royal Flying Corps, University College, Oxford, St Mary's Hospital, National Institute for Medical Research, Stoke Mandeville Hospital

Robert Benedict Bourdillon CBE MC AFC DM (8 September 1889 – 3 March 1971) was a British World War I pilot and medical researcher.

== Early life ==
Born in Easebourne, Midhurst, Sussex, southern England, Robert Benedict Bourdillon was the younger son of the poet and translator Francis William Bourdillon. He attended the Hazelwood School in Surrey until 1901 and was then privately educated. He went on to the University of Oxford in 1908 where he studied at Balliol College.

At Oxford, he was a founder member of the Oxford University Mountaineering Club in 1909. He was also in the Oxford University Officers' Training Corps. In 1912, he graduated from Oxford University with a BA degree in Natural Science. He then went to St Mary's Hospital, London, for further study. After this, he returned to Oxford and became a tutor at University College.

== World War I ==
Robert Bourdillon left Oxford University on 2 August 1914. He was commissioned as a Second Lieutenant in the Intelligence Corps on 6 August 1914. On 8 September 1914, he was attached to the Headquarters of III Corps, where he served as an interpreter since he was fluent in French. On 10 December 1914, he returned to England and went to the Central Flying School, Upavon. Here, on 12 February 1915, he applied to transfer to the Royal Flying Corps Special Reserve of Officers and was commissioned as a temporary Second Lieutenant.

On 29 October 1915, Bourdillon received an Aero Certificate, flying a Maurice Farman Shorthorn biplane. With Louis Strange he developed a simple but effective new bombsight. It was adopted by the Royal Flying Corps and the Royal Naval Air Service. He also helped in developing a phosphorus bomb.

In early 1917, Bourdillon trained further as a pilot and gained his "wings". On 11 April 1917, he joined 27 Squadron, which used Martinsyde Elephants. On 2 May 1917, he was hospitalised. On his return, he was promoted from Flying Officer to Flight Commander.

On 27 July 1917, Bourdillon led five aircraft from 27 Squadron to attack the German Zeppelin sheds located at Berchem-Sainte-Agathe. He left the squadron on 28 August 1917 and joined the RFC Home Establishment. On 26 September 1917, he was awarded the Military Cross. On 21 September 1917, he was promoted to Staff Officer, 2nd Grade. Then on 1 February 1918, he was appointed chief experimental officer. By the end of World War I, Bourdillon was a Captain and was awarded the Air Force Cross in the 1 January 1918 King's Birthday Honours List for his work on bombsight development.

== Later career ==
After World War I, Bourdillon returned to New College, Oxford, where he was awarded an MA degree in 1919. During 1919–1921, he was Fellow and Praelector in Chemistry at University College, Oxford, and was succeeded by E. J. Bowen. During 1919–1921, he was also Dean of the College. He transferred his field from chemistry to medicine and in 1925 he received MB and BCh degrees. During 1925–1926, he was House Physician and then Assistant at the St Mary's Hospital Medical Unit in London. During 1925–1946, he was based at the National Institute for Medical Research, Hampstead, north London. In 1935, he became a Doctor of Medicine. During 1946–1954, he was Director of the Stoke Mandeville Electro-Medical Research Unit.

Bourdillon was a member the Eugenics Society and produced several papers on Vitamin D research.

== Selected publications ==
- Bourdillon, R. B. (3 October 1931). "The quantitative estimation of vitamin D by radiography". The Lancet. 218 (5640): 756. doi:10.1016/S0140-6736(00)81614-1. hdl:2027/coo.31924003690991.
- Bourdillon, R. B.; Bruce, H. M. (1 January 1932). "The determination of vitamin D". Biochemical Journal. 26 (2): 506–521. doi:10.1042/bj0260506. PMC 1260932. PMID 16744851.
- Bourdillon, R. B.; Lidwell, O. M.; Loverlock, J. E.; et al. (1948). Studies in Air Hygiene. Medical Research Council Special Report Series. Vol. 262. London: His Majesty's Stationery Office.

== Personal life ==
Robert Bourdillon married Harriett Ada (née Barnes) on 18 July 1922 at St Mary's Church, Eastbourne in Sussex. They had two sons. One son, Tom Bourdillon, was a mountaineer. Robert and Tom Bourdillon, together with Griffith Pugh, developed the oxygen equipment used for the 1953 British Mount Everest expedition, of which Tom Bourdillon was a member.

On 13 June 1946, Robert Bourdillon was made a CBE in the King's Birthday Honours List. He died in 1971 at Ganges, British Columbia in Canada.

== See also ==
- 1918 Birthday Honours
- 1946 Birthday Honours
