= Expedition climbing =

Style of mountaineering

Aspects of expedition-style climbing

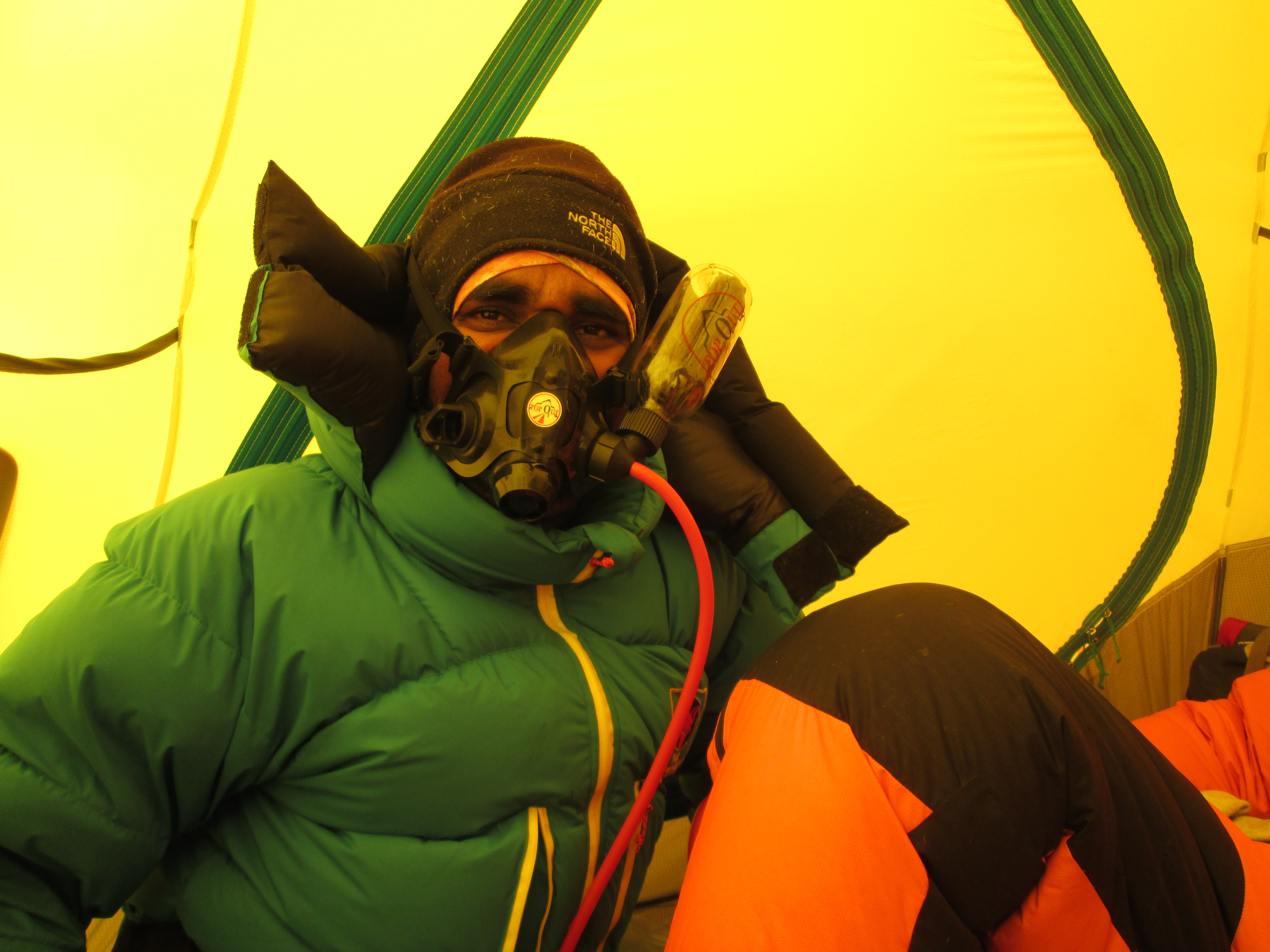
Supplementary oxygen

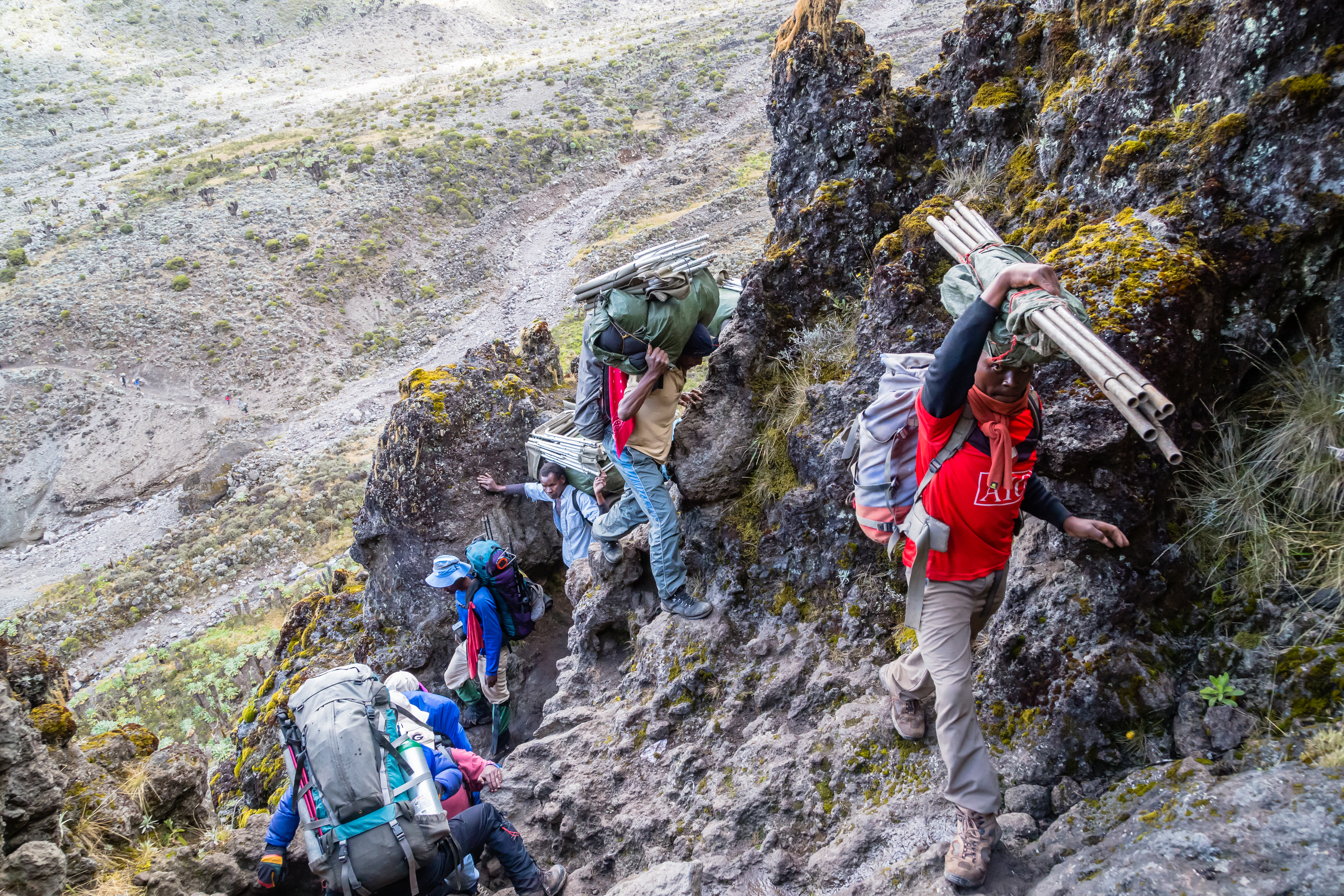
Mountain porters

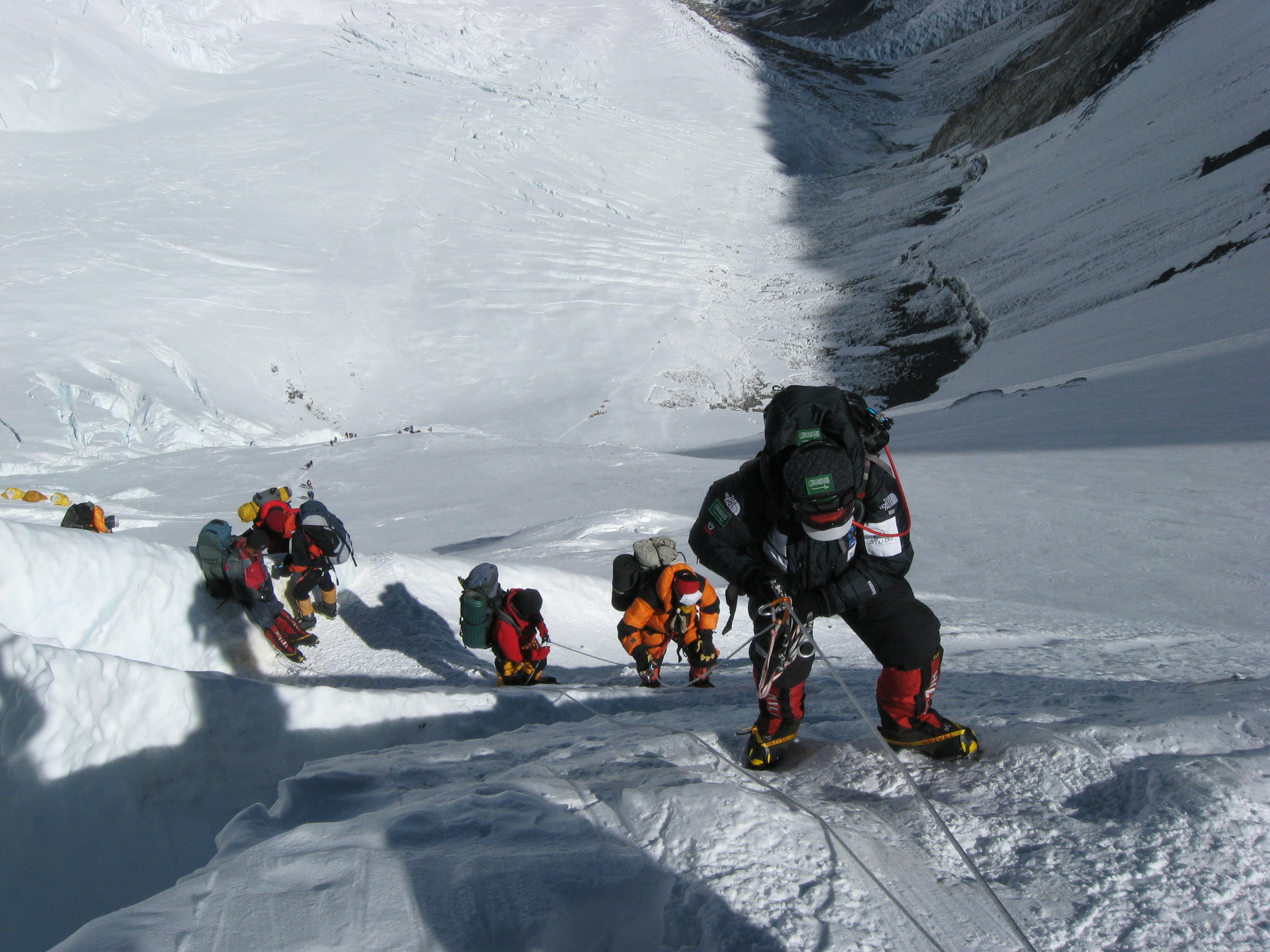
Fixed ropes

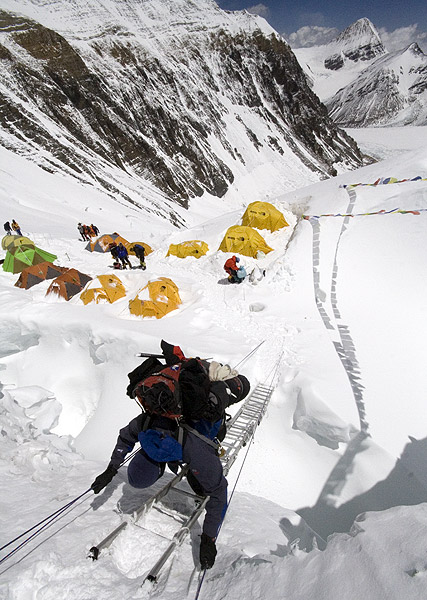
High camps

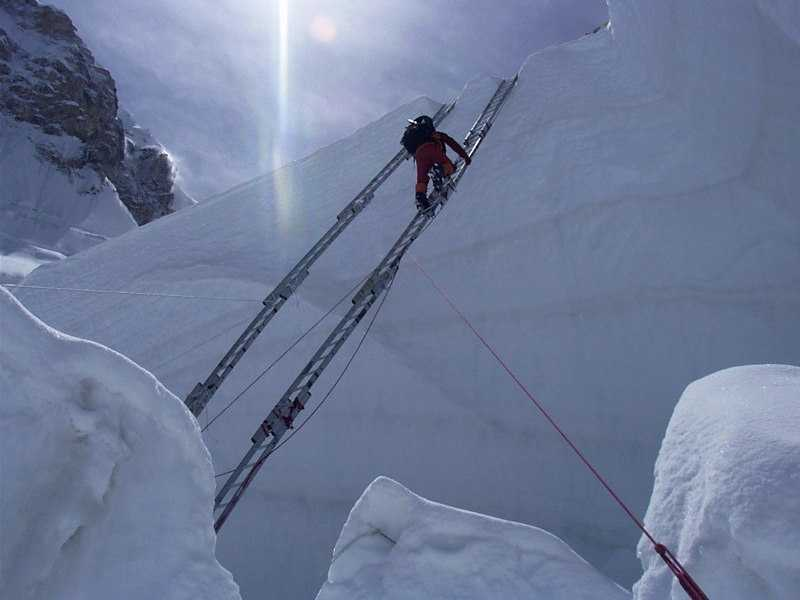
Aluminum ladders

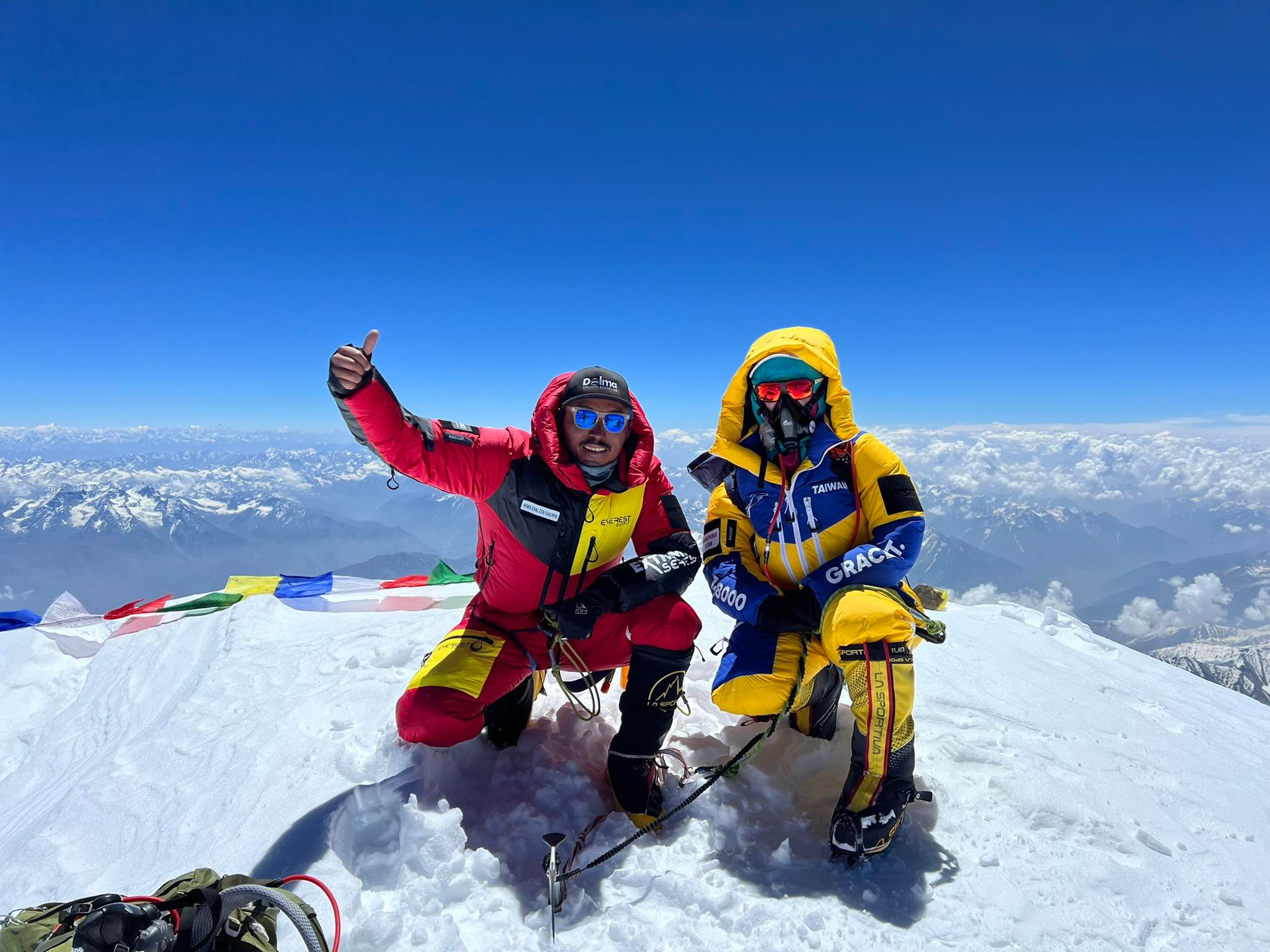
Sherpa support

Expedition climbing (or expedition-style or pejoratively siege climbing) is a type of mountaineering that uses a series of well-stocked camps on the mountain leading to the summit (e.g. Base Camp, Camp 1, Camp 2, etc.), that are supplied by teams of mountain porters. In addition, expedition climbing can also employ multiple 'climbing teams' to work on the climbing route—not all of whom are expected to make the summit—and allows the use of supports such as fixed ropes, aluminum ladders, supplementary oxygen, and sherpa climbers. By its nature, expedition climbing often requires weeks to complete a given climbing route, and months of planning given the greater scale of people and equipment that need to be coordinated for the climb.

'Expedition style' climbing is in direct contrast to 'alpine style' climbing, which involves a single small fast-moving summit climbing team that carries all their supplies and equipment (e.g. no mountain porters or sherpas) and makes little use of support (e.g. no supplementary oxygen or fixed ropes). As a result of having less equipment and supplies, alpine-style teams need to complete their climbing route in days and it is thus considered a riskier form of mountaineering (e.g. if they get trapped in a storm, they have no supplies to wait for the storm to pass). Some argue that this risk is balanced by the fact that alpine-style teams spend less time on the mountain, thus reducing their exposure to other serious risks such as from avalanches and seracs.

Expedition-style was the type of mountaineering Sir Edmund Hillary and Tenzing Norgay used in summitting of Mount Everest, as well as on most major Himalayan mountains — including many of the eight-thousanders — and is thus sometimes termed Himalayan climbing. From the 1970s, leading mountaineers began to favor the 'purer' challenge of alpine-style climbing, led by pioneers such as Reinhold Messner and Peter Habeler, and Doug Scott, Peter Boardman and Joe Tasker. From 2006 onwards, mountaineering's highest award, the Piolets d'Or ceased to recognize expedition-style first ascents, and in 2008 amended their charter to focus exclusively on alpine-style ascents. Expedition climbing techniques are still widely used by commercial adventure companies to guide less experienced clients on Seven Summits or 'accessible eight-thousander' tours, which has brought new risks (e.g. 1996 Everest disaster).

== Notable expeditions ==
While the use of full expedition-style climbing has almost completely diminished amongst leading mountaineers and climbers and is now only used by commercial guiding companies, many notable first ascents in mountaineering, and particularly those of the eight-thousanders, were achieved by employing large-scale expedition-style climbing techniques, including:

Camps of the 1975 British Everest SW Face expedition

- 1950 French Annapurna expedition, the first ascent of an eight-thousander
- 1952 British Cho Oyu expedition
- 1953 German–Austrian Nanga Parbat expedition, despite being an expedition, Herman Buhl's final solo summit push was arguably the birth of high-altitude alpine-style climbing
- 1953 British Mount Everest expedition, the first ascent of Mount Everest
- 1954 Italian expedition to K2
- 1955 French Makalu expedition
- 1955 British Kangchenjunga expedition
- 1960 Chinese Mount Everest expedition
- 1970 British Annapurna South Face expedition, the first expedition to try high-altitude 'big wall' climbing
- 1975 British Mount Everest Southwest Face expedition, often considered "the apotheosis of the big, military-style expeditions", and marked a peak expedition-style climbing by leading climbers in the Himalayas.
- American Women's Himalayan Expedition of 1978
- 1996 Mount Everest disaster, the tragedy highlighted the dangers of using expedition-climbing techniques to guide weaker climbers to the summits of eight-thousanders.

== See also ==
- Exploration
- List of Mount Everest expeditions
- Seven Summits
