= Tom Bourdillon =

English mountaineer (1924–1956)

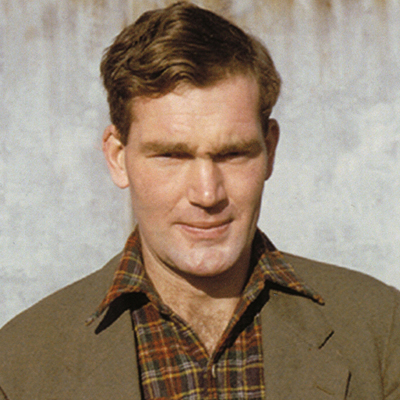
Photograph of Bourdillon, date unknown

Thomas Duncan Bourdillon (/bɔːrˈdɪlən/ bor-DIL-ən; 16 March 1924 – 29 July 1956) was an English mountaineer and member of the 1953 British Mount Everest Expedition which made the first ascent of Mount Everest. He died in Valais, Switzerland, on 29 July 1956 aged 32.

== Background and education ==
Born in Kensington, London, Bourdillon was the elder son of Robert Benedict Bourdillon (1889–1971), a scientist who in 1909 had been a founding member of the Oxford University Mountaineering Club and of his wife, Harriet Ada Barnes. He was a grandson of the poet Francis William Bourdillon, nephew of Francis Bernard Bourdillon, and cousin of John Francis Bourdillon.

Bourdillon was educated at Gresham's School, Holt, and Balliol College, Oxford, where he read Physics and was president of the Oxford University Mountaineering Club.

== Career ==
Bourdillon made a career as a physicist in rocket research.

== Mountaineer ==
Active as a climber while still a schoolboy, Bourdillon developed his climbing during his years at the University of Oxford. By his mid-twenties he was an inspiring figure in the renaissance of British climbing in the Alps, and he then moved on to the challenge of the Greater Ranges and Mount Everest.

Bourdillon had been with Eric Shipton on the 1951 reconnaissance of Everest and on Cho Oyu in 1952. He was in charge of the oxygen equipment on the 1952 and 1953 expeditions, and recommended closed-circuit equipment.

With his father, Robert Bourdillon, he developed the closed-circuit bottled oxygen apparatus used by Charles Evans and himself on their climb to the South Summit of Everest on 26 May 1953. Bourdillon could have been either the first or second man to officially reach the summit of Everest, but he was forced back when Evans's oxygen system failed. The pair came within 300 feet (91 m) of the Main Summit; both turning back after reaching the South Summit. Three days later, expedition leader John Hunt directed Edmund Hillary and Tenzing Norgay to go for the Main Summit, using open-circuit equipment; which they reached on 29 May 1953. Bourdillon never attempted an Everest expedition again.

Bourdillon died with another climber, Richard Viney, in a climbing accident on 29 July 1956, while ascending the east buttress of the Jägihorn in the Bernese Oberland.

== Family ==
On 15 March 1951, Bourdillon married Jennifer Elizabeth Clapham Thomas (born 1929), a daughter of Ronald Clapham Thomas, at Hendon. They lived near Aylesbury and had one daughter, Nicola, born in 1954, and one son, Simon, who was only ten weeks old when his father died.

In July 2018, Bourdillon's widow opened a new outdoor activity centre at Gresham's School, with an assault course, a zip wire, abseiling, and a climbing tower.

== Films ==
Bourdillon appears as himself in the film The Conquest of Everest (1953) and in archive footage in The Race for Everest (2003).

== Sources ==
- Mount Everest Reconnaissance Expedition 1951 by Eric Shipton (1952)
- The Ascent of Everest by John Hunt (1953)
