= Preston Mountaineering Club =

British organisation founded in 1933

- Abbreviation: PMC
- Formation: 1933
- Type: Mountaineering Club
- Headquarters: Preston, United Kingdom
- Region served: North West England, primarily Preston and Blackburn
- Affiliations: British Mountaineering Council (BMC)
- Remarks: Founded by climbers from the Preston and Blackburn area; historically associated with the Lake District.

The Preston Mountaineering Club is one of the older mountaineering clubs in the United Kingdom. Members from the Preston and Blackburn area founded the club in 1933. In the early days of the club, regular visitors were from Lake District given its proximity to the area. The PMC is affiliated to the British Mountaineering Council.
