= South Summit =

Subsidiary peak of Mount Everest

South Summit of Mount Everest
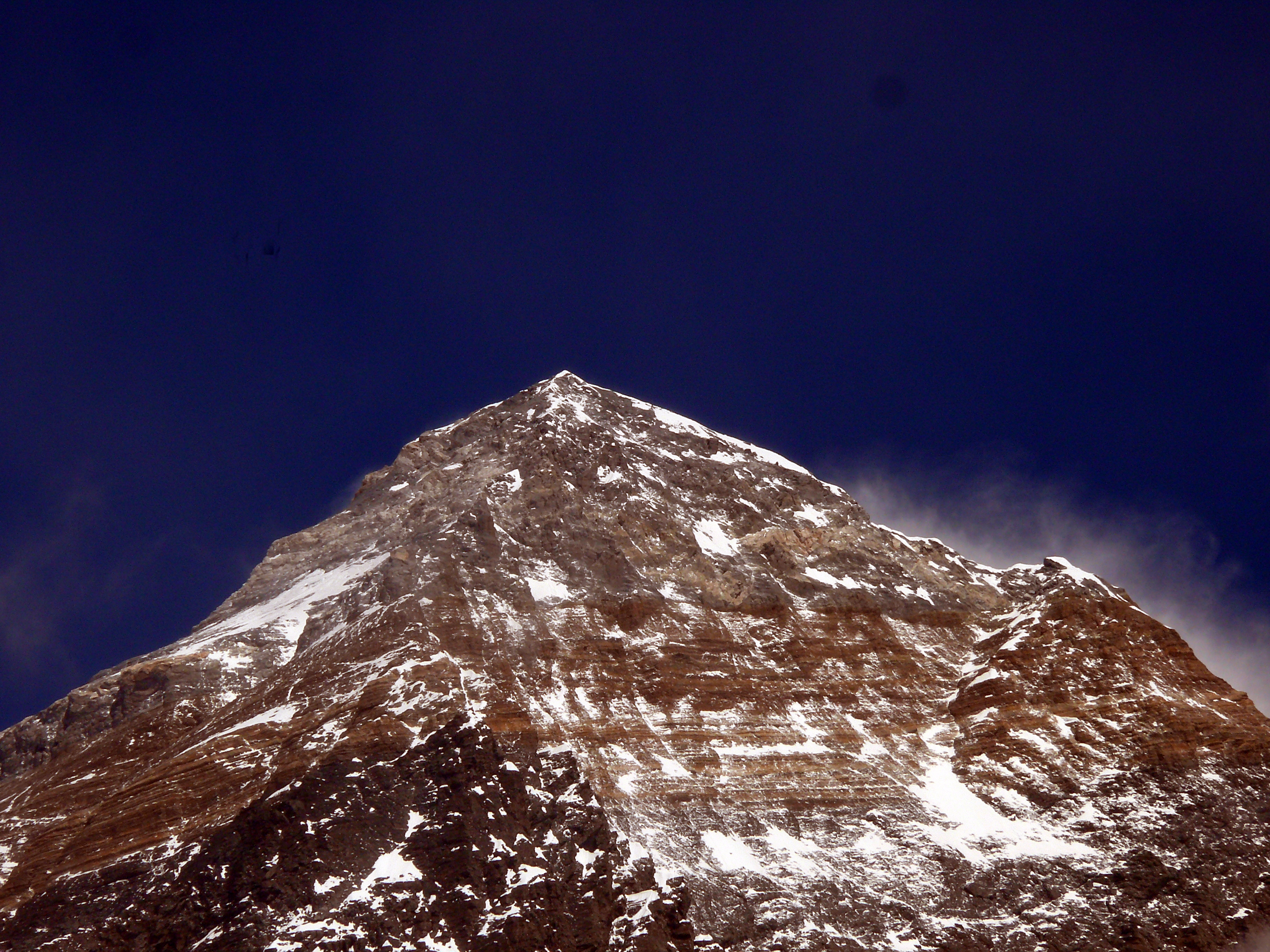
- The south summit is the sub-peak on the right side

Highest point
- Elevation: 8,749 m (28,704 ft)
- Prominence: 11 m (36 ft)
- Parent peak: Mount Everest
- Isolation: 0.36 km (0.22 mi)
- Listing: Eight-thousanders
- Coordinates: 27°59′6″N 86°55′33″E

Geography
- Location within Nepal
- Location: Mount Everest, Solukhumbu District, Sagarmatha Zone, Nepal; Mount Everest, Tingri County, Xigazê, Tibet Autonomous Region, China
- Parent range: Mahalangur Himal, Himalayas

Climbing
- First ascent: May 26, 1953
- Normal route: Traversing the South Col

The South Summit is a subsidiary peak of Mount Everest in the Himalayas between the South Col (at 7,906 metres (25,938 ft)) and the main summit (at 8,849 metres or 29,032 feet) above sea level. Although the South Summit's elevation of 8,749 metres (28,704 ft) is higher than the second-highest mountain on Earth (K2 at 8,611 m or 28,251 ft), it is not considered a separate mountain as its topographic prominence is only 11 meters.

== Overview ==
The South Summit is a dome-shaped peak of snow and ice approximately 130 metres (430 ft) distant from the summit of Mount Everest and 100 metres (330 ft) below it, connected to it by the Cornice Traverse and Hillary Step. It was first climbed by Charles Evans and Tom Bourdillon of the 1953 British Mount Everest expedition on 26 May 1953. They arrived at 1 pm, too late to continue on because of problems with Evans' oxygen set. Three days later, on 29 May, Edmund Hillary and Tenzing Norgay passed over the South Summit en route to achieving the main peak.

== History ==
On reaching the South Col in 1953, expedition leader John Hunt was struck by the sight, writing "Above us rose the South Summit of Everest ... an elegant snow spire, breathtakingly close yet nearly 3000 feet above our heads ... none of us had been prepared for any spectacle quite so sharp, quite so beautiful as this. To me it seemed that a new and unsuspected peak of alpine stature stood above the South Col."

A geologist with the 1965 Indian Everest expedition discovered a deposit of fossils of seashells in limestone about 100 feet above the South Summit.

Recounting his first ascent of Mount Everest without supplemental oxygen in 1978, Reinhold Messner described the South Summit as "quite a milestone for me".

During the 1996 Mount Everest disaster, mountain guide Rob Hall and three other people died at the South Summit while descending from the main summit in an unexpected blizzard. Hall survived overnight, and established radio contact the following day, but froze to death later that day, May 11, 1996. His body remains on the South Summit.

The South Summit is a popular place for Everest climbers to pause, change oxygen bottles, and turn around if necessary. From this location the cornice traverse, summit and, formerly, the Hillary Step, can be seen in clear weather.

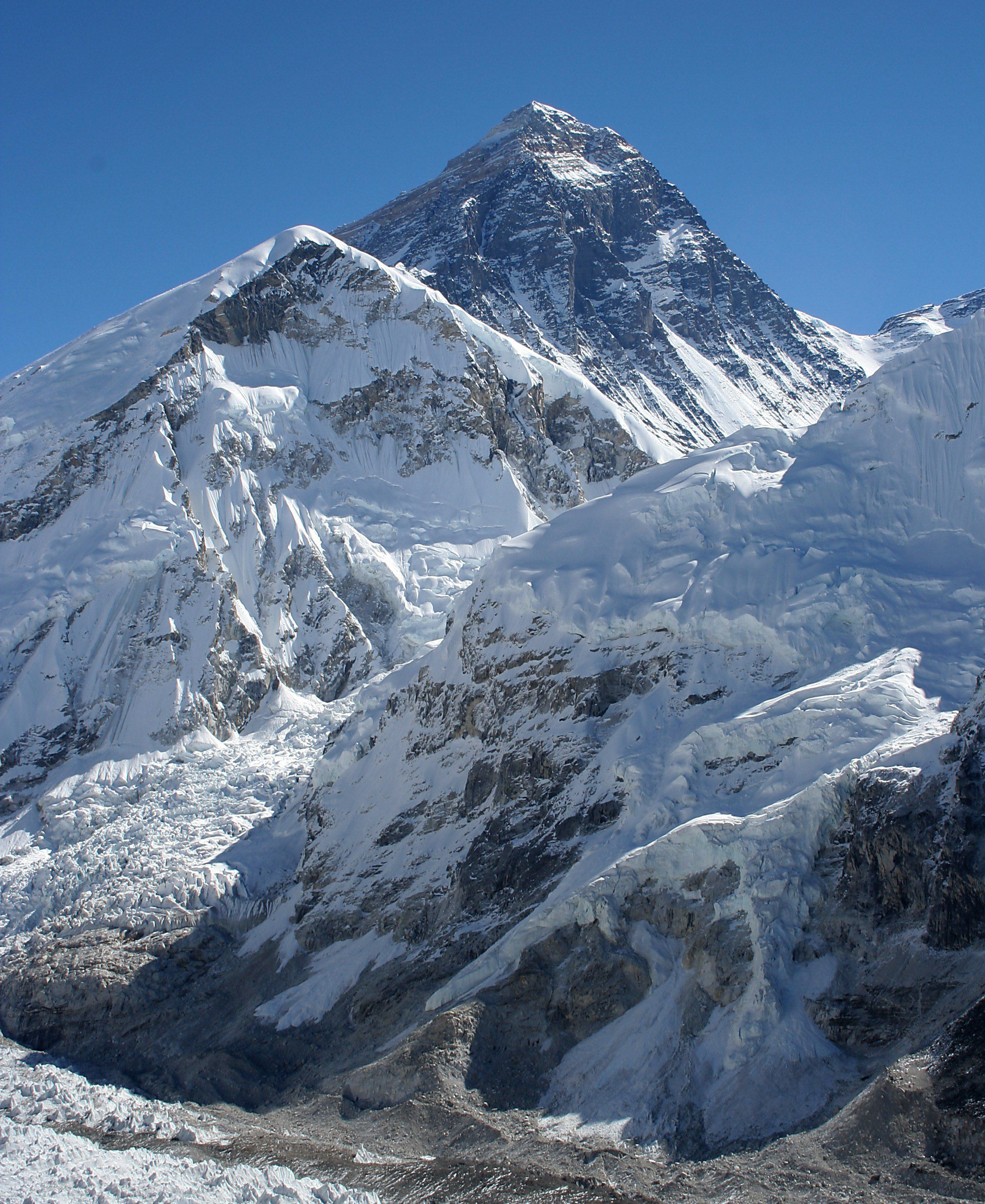
The South summit is visible on the ridge to the right of the highest point. The saddle-shaped South Col is the lowest point of that ridge.

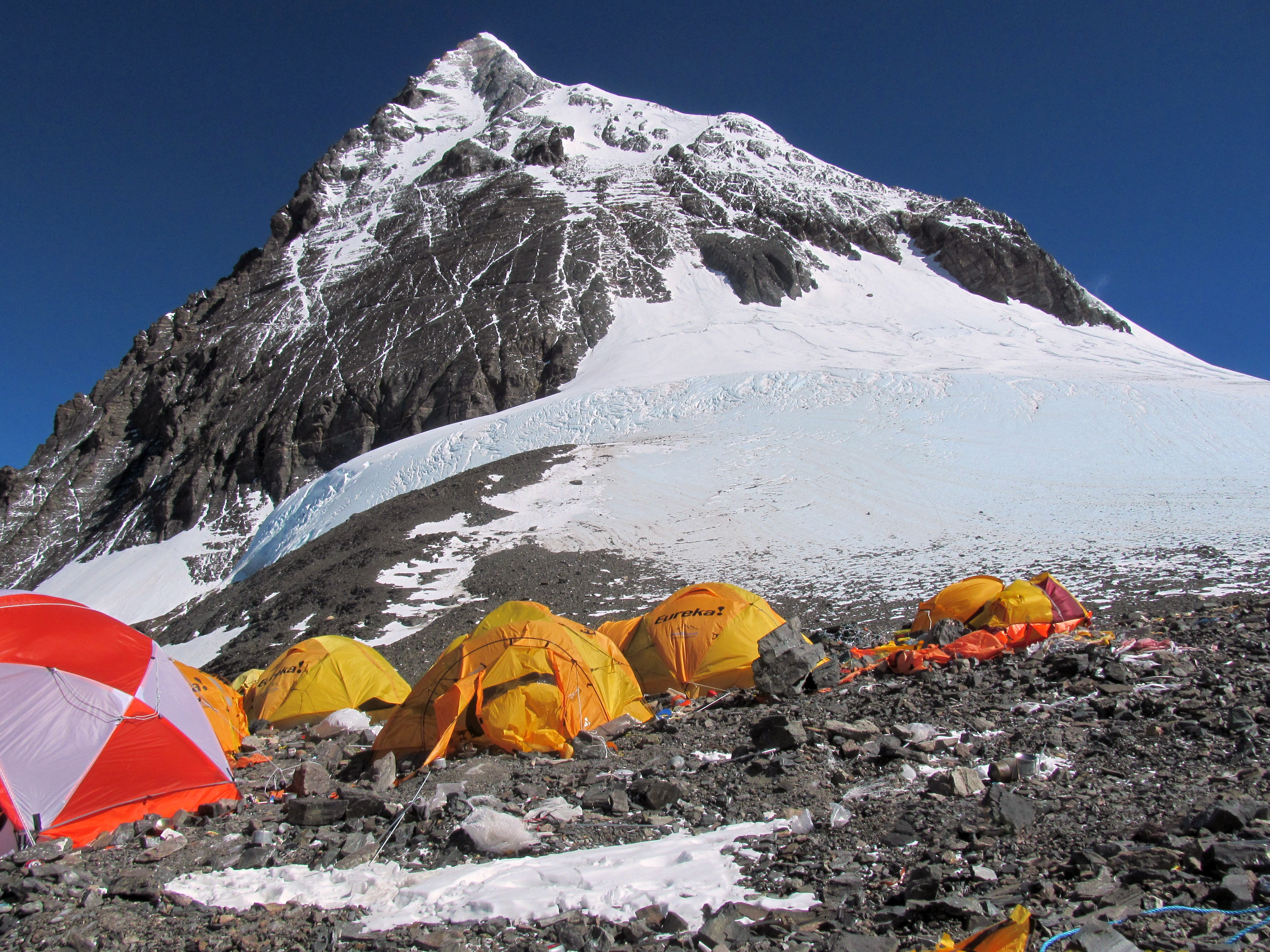
From this perspective on the South Col the south summit is the high point
