= Colin Smith =

Colin Smith may refer to:

- Colin Smith (athlete) (1935–2014), British javelin thrower
- Colin Smith (Australian rower), Australian lightweight rower
- Colin Smith (British rower) (born 1983), British rower
- Colin Smith (Buckinghamshire cricketer), English cricketer
- Colin Smith (hymnwriter) (1928–2005), Australian Christian Brother and hymnwriter
- Colin Smith (ice hockey) (born 1993), Canadian ice hockey player
- Colin Smith (journalist) (born 1944), English journalist and author
- Colin Smith (musician) (1934–2004), English trumpeter
- Colin Smith (sailor) (1928–2008), Hong Kong Olympic sailor
- Colin Smith (Scottish cricketer) (born 1972), Scottish cricketer
- Colin Smith (Scottish footballer) (born 1951), Scottish footballer
- Colin Smith, lead singer of rock band Mrnorth
- Colin Milner Smith (1936–2020), English cricketer and judge
- Colin Smith (engineer) (born 1955/1956), director of engineering and technology at Rolls-Royce plc
- Colin S. Smith (born 1958), American pastor
- Colin Stansfield Smith (1932–2013), British cricketer, architect and academic
- Colin Smith (English footballer, born 1951), English football defender with Cardiff City and Aldershot
- Colin Smith (English footballer, born 1958), English football defender with Darlington
- Colin Smith (lepidopterist) (1936–2023), British lepidopterist
- Colin Smith (minister) (1802–1867), minister of the Church of Scotland and amateur botanist

== See also ==
- Colin Bostock-Smith (born 1942), television and radio comedy writer
- Colin Smyth (born 1972), Scottish politician
- Collin Smith (born 2003), American soccer player
