= List of honorary citizens of Nepal =

This is a list of honorary citizens of Nepal.

== List ==
Year	Name	Country	Notes	Ref(s)
1995	Toni Hagen	Switzerland	Geologist	
2003	Edmund Hillary	New Zealand	Mountaineer	
2019	Colin Philip Smith	United Kingdom	Lepidopterist; widely known as "Putali Bajey"	
2020	Um Hong-gil	South Korea	Mountaineer	
