= Our God, Our Help in Ages Past =

Christian hymn by Isaac Watts

Oh God, Our Help in Ages Past
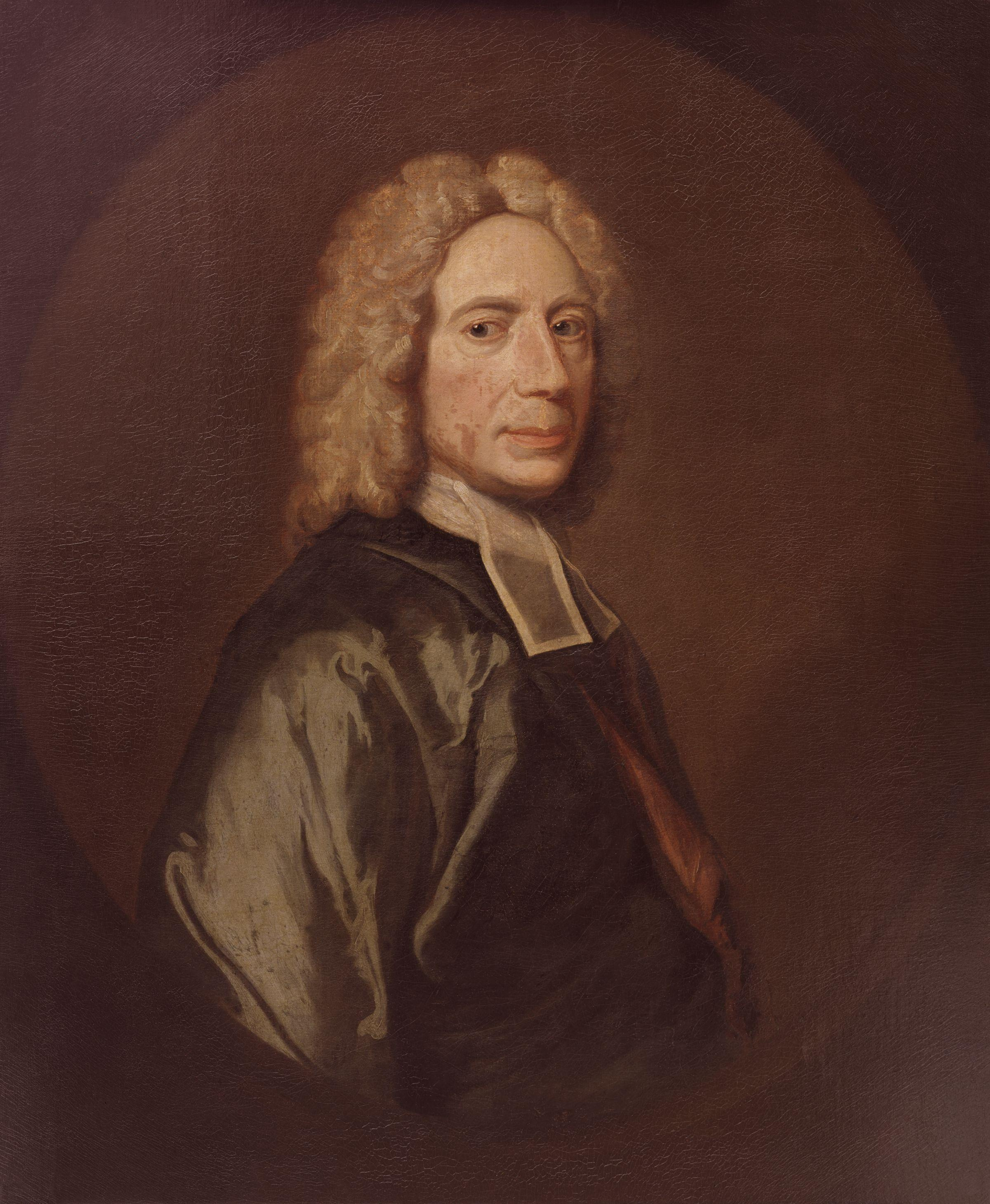
- Isaac Watts in 1705
- Genre: Hymn
- Written: 1708
- Text: Isaac Watts
- Based on: Psalm 90
- Meter: 8.6.8.6 (C.M.)
- Melody: "St. Anne" by William Croft

"Our God, Our Help in Ages Past" (or "O God, Our Help in Ages Past") is a hymn by Isaac Watts in 1708 that paraphrases the 90th Psalm of the Book of Psalms. It originally consisted of nine stanzas; however, in present usage the fourth, sixth, and eighth stanzas are commonly omitted to leave a total of six (Methodist hymn books also include the original sixth stanza to leave a total of seven).

== History ==
The hymn was originally part of The Psalms of David Imitated in the Language of the New Testament, published by Watts in 1719. In this book he paraphrased in Christian verse the entire psalter with the exception of twelve Psalms which he felt were unsuited for Christian usage. In 1738, John Wesley in his hymnal, A Collection of Psalms and Hymns, changed the first line of the text from "Our God" to "O God". Both Watts' original text and Wesley's rewording remain in current use.

The hymn is often sung as part of the Remembrance Day service in Canada and on similar occasions in the United Kingdom, including at the annual Remembrance Sunday service at the Cenotaph in London.

The hymn tune "St. Anne" (common metre 86.86) to which the text is most often sung was composed by William Croft in 1708 whilst he was the organist of St Anne's Church, Soho: hence the name of the tune. It first appeared anonymously in the Supplement to the New Version of the Psalms, 6th edition in 1708. It was originally intended to be used with a version of Psalm 62. It was not until sometime later when set to Watts' text that the tune gained recognition.

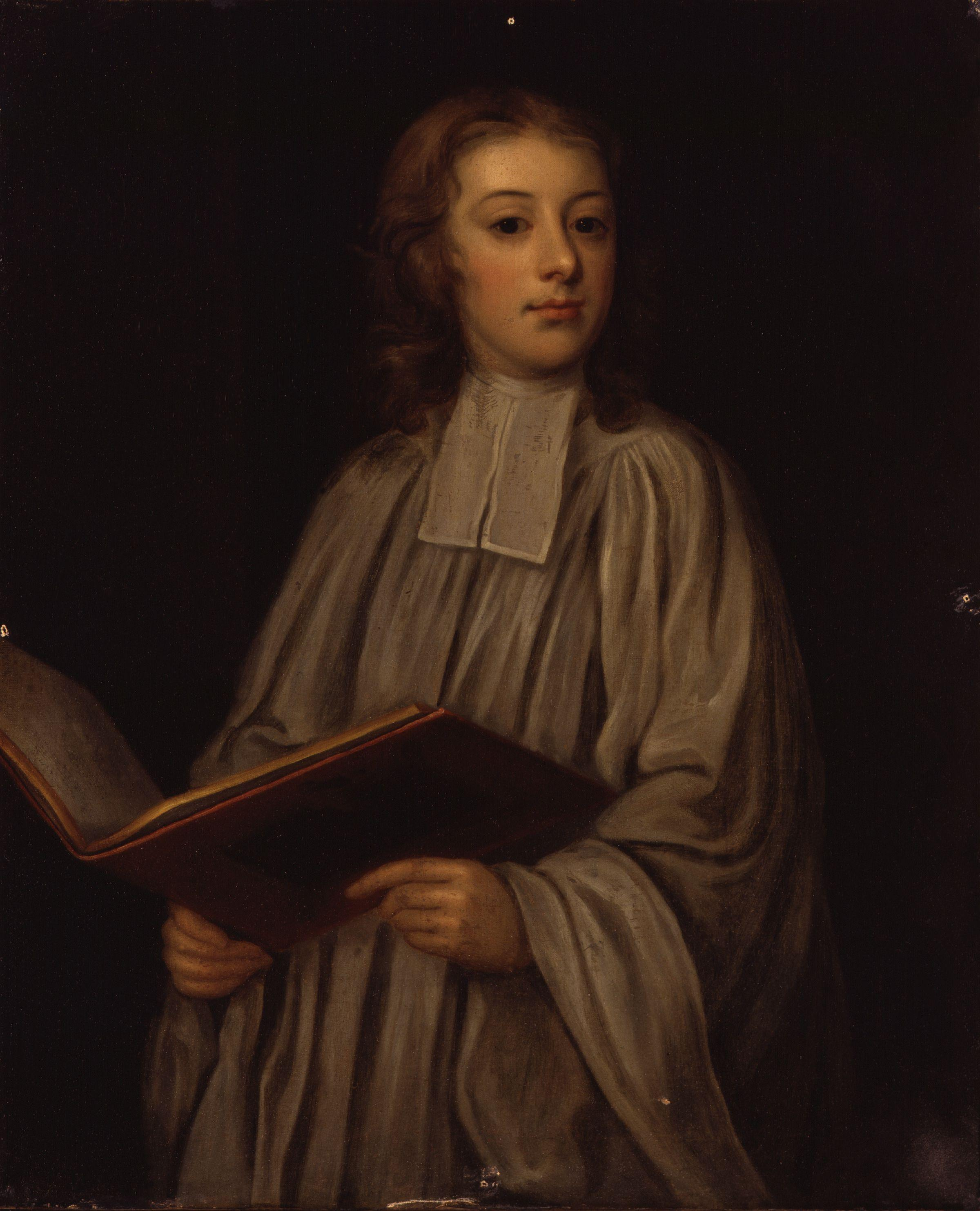
William Croft as a choirboy, circa 1690. National Portrait Gallery, London.

Later composers subsequently incorporated the tune in their own works. For example, George Handel used the tune in an anthem entitled, "O Praise the Lord". J. S. Bach's Fugue in E-flat major BWV 552 is often called the "St. Anne" in the English-speaking world, because of the similarity of its subject to the first line of the hymn tune, though there is some debate as to whether Bach used the actual tune after hearing it, or coincidentally created himself the very similar tune used as the fugal theme. Young Bach's inspirator and mentor Dieterich Buxtehude, church administrator and organist of St Mary's in Lübeck in north Germany, used the same first line of the hymn tune as theme for the (first) fugue of his Praeludium-pedaliter in E major for organ.

J.S. Bach, Prelude and Fugue in E-flat major – Fugue

Arthur Sullivan uses the tune in the first and last sections of his Festival Te Deum, first in a relatively standard setting, but eventually pairing it with a military march accompaniment. The American composer Carl Ruggles (1876–1971) used the text in his last composition, "Exaltation" (for Brass, Chorus, and Organ) in 1958, in memory of his wife Charlotte who had died the previous year. The hymn and words are also featured in Vaughan Williams's anthem "Lord, thou hast been our refuge", using both the Book of Common Prayer's words and those of Watts. Brother Colin Smith also arranged a setting of this hymn.

== Lyrics ==
In modern hymnals, some stanzas are omitted, for example as in The New English Hymnal:

1 O God, our help in ages past,
Our hope for years to come,
Our shelter from the stormy blast,
And our eternal home;

2 Under the shadow of thy throne
Thy saints have dwelt secure;
Sufficient is thine arm alone,
And our defence is sure.

3 Before the hills in order stood,
Or earth received her frame,
From everlasting thou art God,
To endless years the same.

4 A thousand ages in thy sight
Are like an evening gone,
Short as the watch that ends the night
Before the rising sun.

5 Time, like an ever-rolling stream,
Bears all its sons away;
They fly forgotten, as a dream
Dies at the opening day.

6 O God, our help in ages past,
Our hope for years to come,
Be thou our guard while troubles last,
And our eternal home.

== Notable uses ==
- 14 April 1912 – according to passenger Archibald Gracie IV, it was the last hymn sung at a church service presided over by Captain Edward John Smith on the morning before the RMS Titanic sank.
- The hymn is included in "the Traditional Music" of the National Service of Remembrance, whose programme of music was finalised in 1930.
- 1941 – on board HMS Prince of Wales at a religious service attended by Winston Churchill and Franklin Delano Roosevelt as part of the conference creating the Atlantic Charter.
- May 1942 – Elizabeth Goudge quotes the line "A thousand ages in Thy sight are as an evening gone" in a vignette of the London Blitz, when a husband and wife, remembering their life together, are killed during an air-raid in her war-time novel The Castle on the Hill (Chapter X, Part II, p 207)
- H. G. Wells quotes the seventh stanza of the hymn in the first chapter – "The End Closes in upon Mind" – of the last of the 146 books he published during his lifetime, the bleak Mind at the End of its Tether (1945), and adds his own comment: "But hitherto other sons have appeared, and now only does life pass plainly into a phase of complete finality, so that one can apprehend and anticipate its end."
- Bing Crosby included the hymn in his album Beloved Hymns (1951).
- It was sung at the funeral of Winston Churchill.
- It is the University Anthem of the University of California, Berkeley.
- It is the College song for St. Stephen's College, Delhi.
- It is the College hymn for Grove City College.
- It is also the School hymn for King Edward VI School, Southampton, which Isaac Watts himself attended, and the peal of the Southampton Civic Centre clock tower.
- Alan Hovhaness set the text to new music in his choral & organ work O God our help in ages past.
- The hymn tune is employed prominently in John Addison's Academy Award-winning score for the 1963 movie Tom Jones.
- Its fourth stanza appears at the beginning of Gene Wolfe's The Shadow of the Torturer.
- In Evelyn Waugh's Decline and Fall the prisoners communicate the death of Prendergast, bypassing a rule of silence by amending the words of the hymn in chapel.
- The stanza beginning "Time, like an ever rolling stream" is quoted word-for-word in the first lines of "Bath" on The Divine Comedy's album Promenade.
- On 10 November 1986 it was sung at the launch meeting of Ulster loyalist paramilitary group Ulster Resistance, a gathering of over 2,000 people at Ulster Hall, Belfast, where the hymn was described as "Ulster's battle hymn".
- This hymn was also the only hymn sung at the 8th president, Martin Van Buren's funeral in Kinderhook, New York.
