= Kea Conservation Trust =

Environmental protection organization

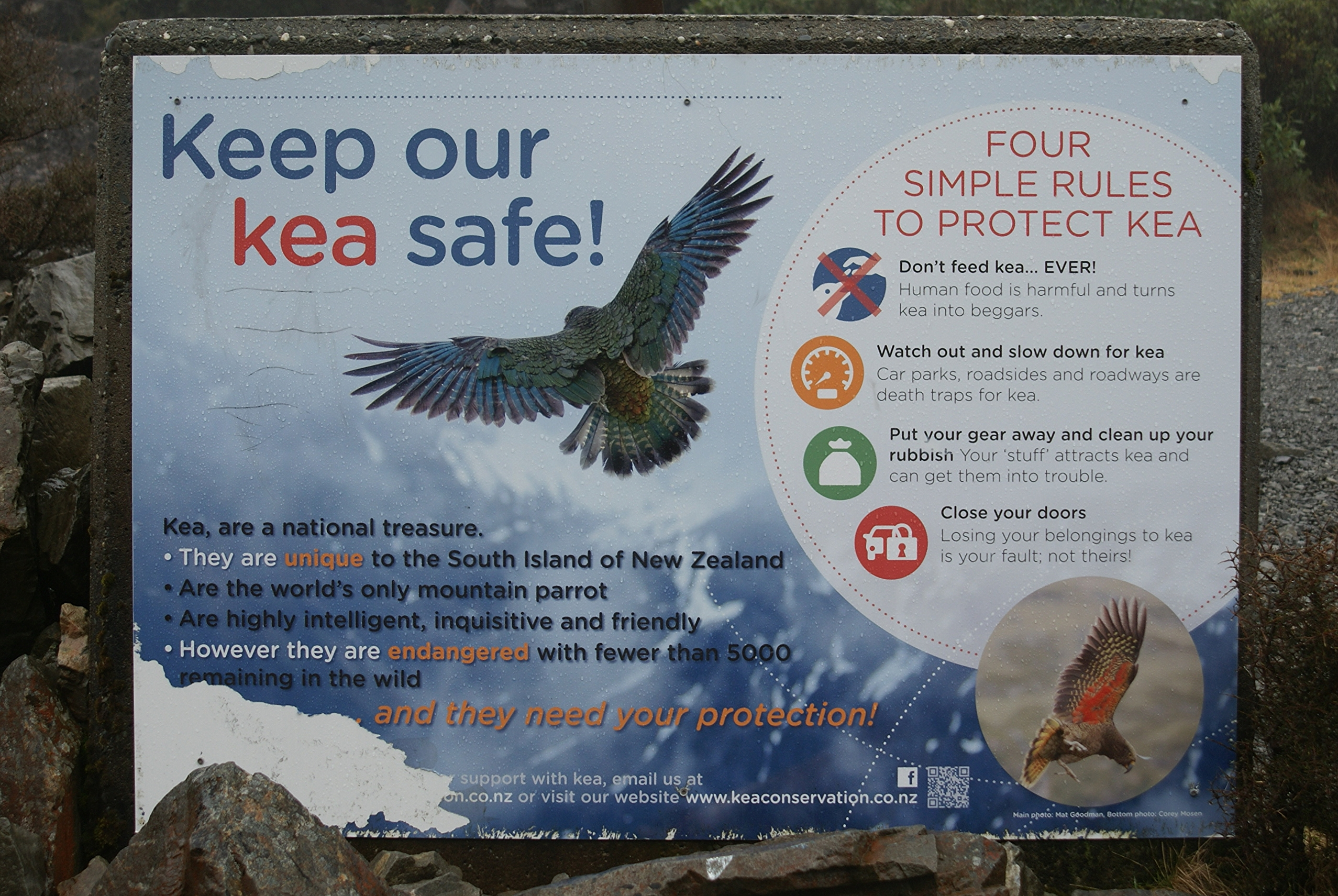
An information board located at Deaths Corner (Otira Viaduct lookout) put in place by the Kea Conservation Trust.

The Kea Conservation Trust is a New Zealand conservation non-governmental organization working to protect kea, a large alpine parrot found only in the South Island of New Zealand.

== History ==
The Kea Conservation Trust was incorporated in 2006 as a charitable trust, then later registered as a charity in 2008. It was founded by current chairperson Tamsin Orr-Walker and three other trustees to raise money for research and to work with other community conservation groups, such as the Fiordland Wapiti Foundation.

Since 2017 Peter Hillary, son of mountaineer Sir Edmund Hillary, has been the patron of the Trust. In 2019, Orr-Walker was appointed as a Member of the New Zealand Order of Merit for services to kea conservation.

== Activities ==
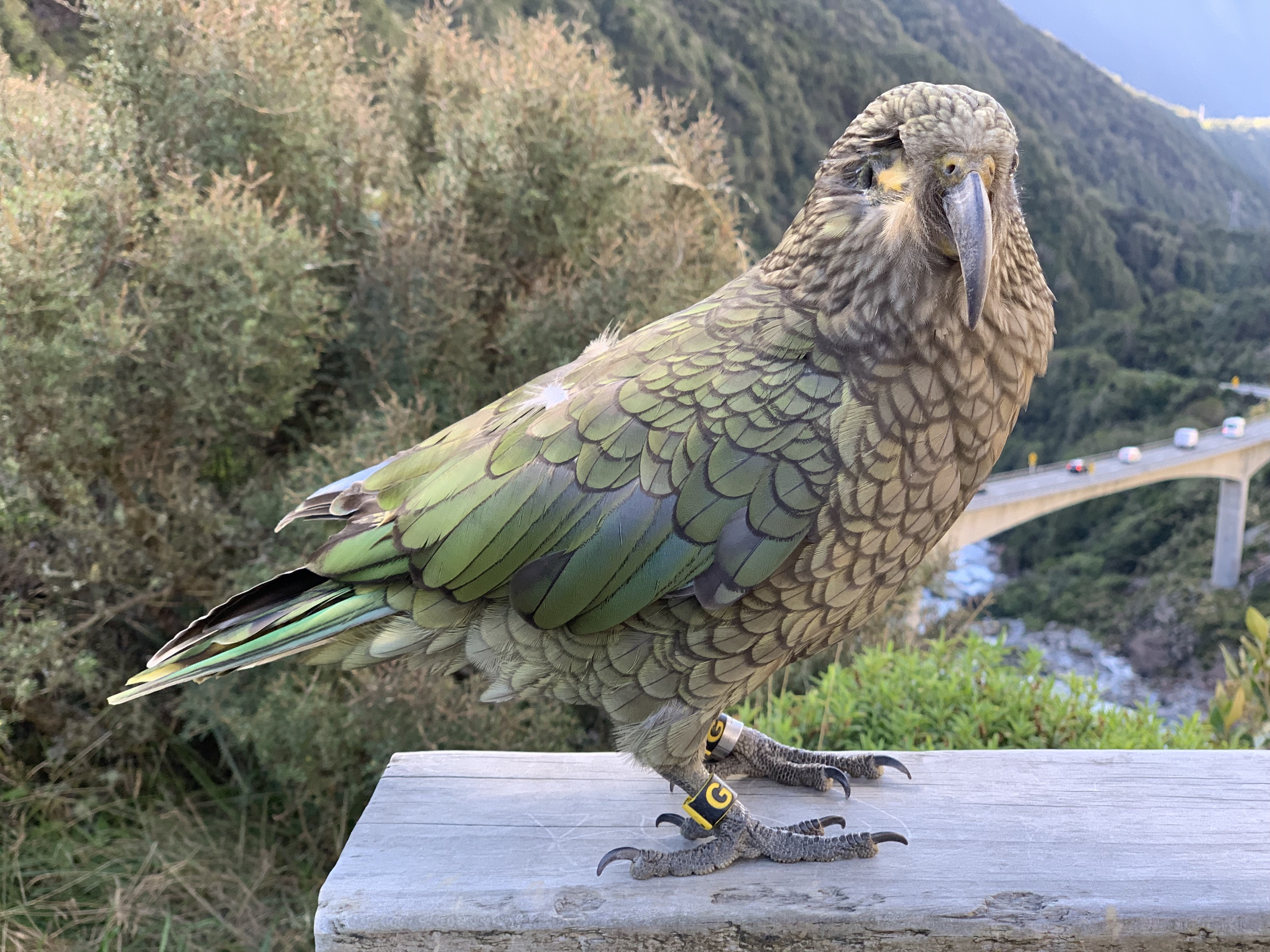
Photo of a one-eyed kea called Tūhura ("Yellow G on Black")

The Trust's activities are diverse and include:

- Providing educational material.
- Working with community partners including the Fiordland Wapiti Foundation to conduct kea research.
- Monitoring threats to kea in areas such as the Matukituki River valley, and in Fiordland.
- Since 2017, held biennial 'Kea Summits' to provide a forum in which people can network and share knowledge on kea status, threats and conservation, as well as come up with conservation strategies.
- Working with commercial partners such as forestry companies and ski field operators to understand more about populations of kea in the vicinity of these sites.
- Running the Kea Database, citizen science platform where members of the public can report sightings of individual kea and look up birds based on bands on their legs.

== Trustees and office holders ==
As of 2020 the Trust has six trustees, three appointed office-holders, a scientific advisor, two field personnel and a "kea dog" named Ajax, who was the subject of a book and short documentary film.
