= Peter Hillary =

New Zealand mountain climber (born 1954)

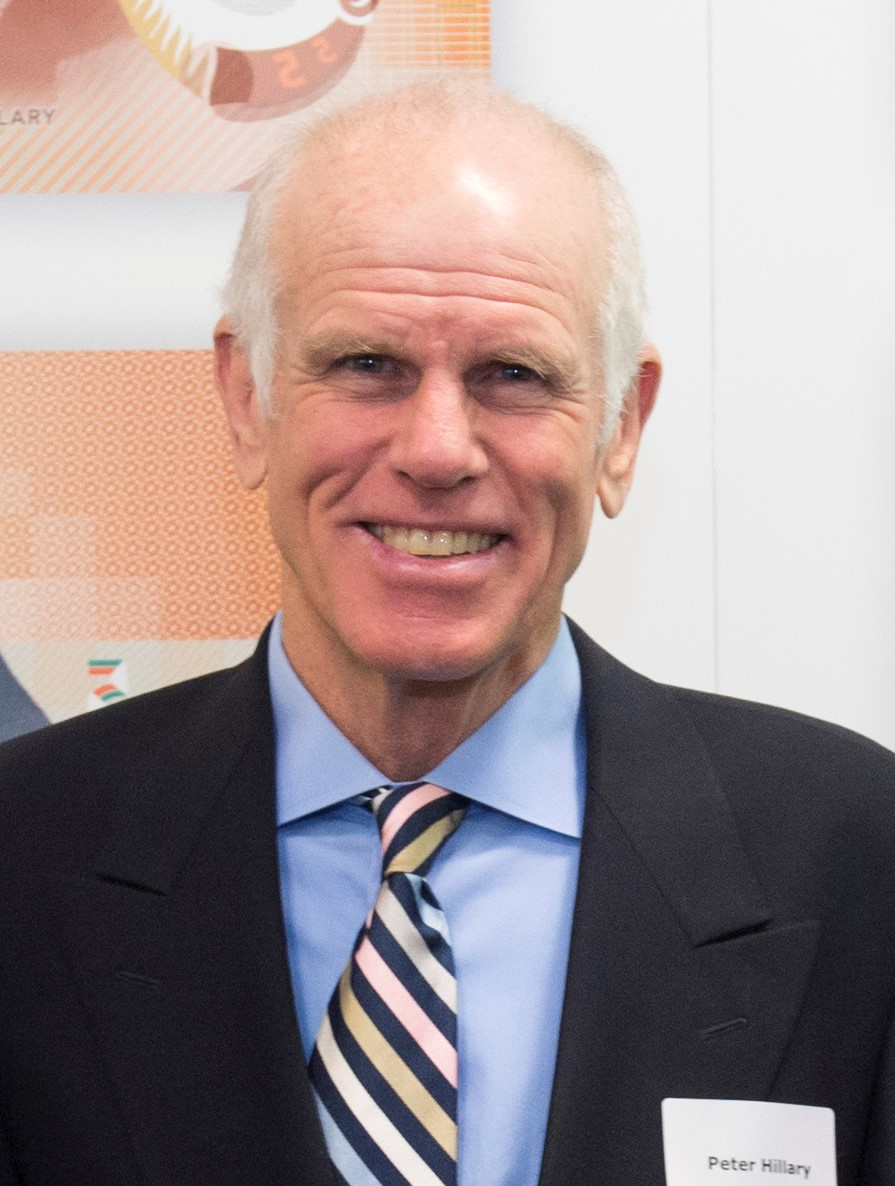
- Hillary in 2015
- Born: Peter Edmund Hillary; 26 December 1954 (age 71); Auckland, New Zealand
- Occupations: Mountaineer, philanthropist, writer
- Spouse(s): Ann Moorhead (divorced) Yvonne Oomen
- Children: 5
- Parents: Edmund Hillary; Louise Mary Rose
- Relatives: Sarah Hillary (sister)

Peter Edmund Hillary (born 26 December 1954) is a New Zealand mountaineer and philanthropist. He is the son of Sir Edmund Hillary, who, along with mountaineer Tenzing Norgay, completed the first successful ascent of Mount Everest. When Peter Hillary summited Everest in 1990, he and his father were the first father/son duo to achieve the feat. Hillary has achieved two summits of Everest, an 84-day trek across Antarctica to the South Pole, and an expedition guiding astronaut Neil Armstrong to land a small aircraft at the North Pole. He has climbed many of the world's major peaks, and on 19 June 2008, completed the Seven Summits, reaching the top of the highest mountains on all seven continents, when he summited Denali in Alaska.

== Personal life ==
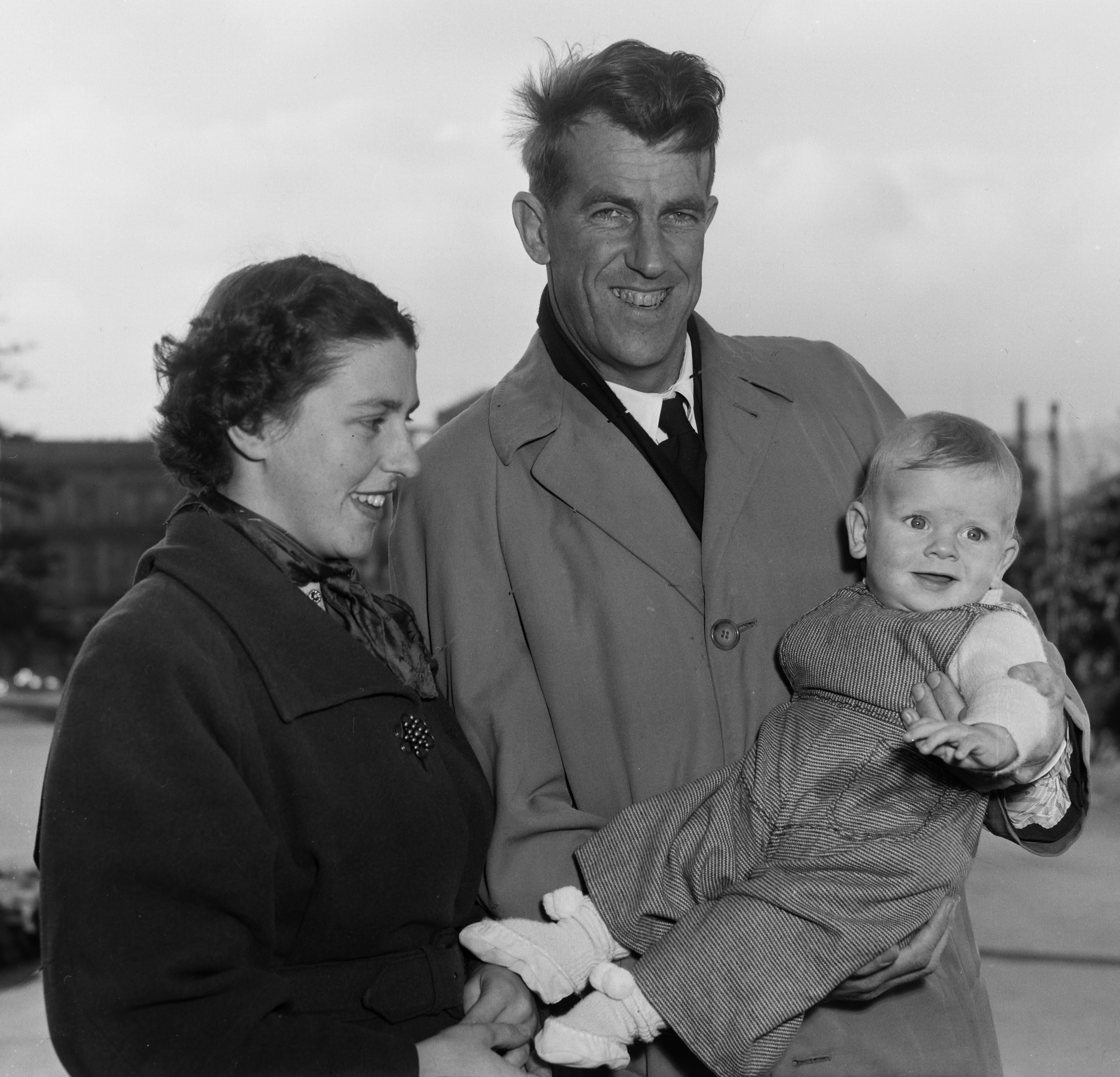
Peter Hillary, as an infant, with his parents, Louise and Edmund, 1955

Peter Edmund Hillary was born in Auckland, New Zealand, on 26 December 1954. He had two younger sisters, Sarah Louise and Belinda Mary, and was the eldest of the three children of Sir Edmund Hillary and his first wife, Louise Mary Rose. Peter Hillary received his education at King's College, Auckland and at Auckland University.

As a child, Hillary travelled the world extensively. In 1962, when he was seven, his family travelled all over the United States and Canada while Sir Edmund was on an extended lecture tour. On the way back to New Zealand, the Hillary family capped off their year abroad in Nepal for a visit with Tenzing Norgay. Additional travels included trips to the United Kingdom; drives in the deserts of Australia; learning to ski on New Zealand's South Island; climbing New Zealand's highest peak, Aoraki / Mount Cook; and sitting around campfires in the Himalayas. At age eleven, his father took him to climb Mount Everest.

On 31 March 1975, after having spent a year in Nepal, Hillary's mother and youngest sister, sixteen-year-old Belinda, were killed when their plane crashed shortly after taking off from a Kathmandu airfield. Hillary, then twenty, was in Assam, India, visiting a friend, when he received the news that there were no survivors in the crash. He described Lady Hillary and Belinda as 'the glue that bonded the family together'.

Hillary's climbing friend, Australian Mark Moorhead, died on 15 October 1983 attempting to ascend Makalu, a Himalayan mountain that is the fifth-highest in the world. When Hillary went to pay his respects to the family, he met Moorhead's sister Ann, whom he would later marry. They separated in 1993 when Hillary began talking about resuming his mountaineering career after a three-year hiatus, and were subsequently divorced. Hillary later married Yvonne Oomen, with whom he has two children, Alexander and Lily; he also has two children, Amelia and George, from his first marriage.

On 11 January 2008, Hillary was in Lisbon, Portugal, at a dinner with some clients when he was informed his father had died of a sudden heart attack at Auckland Hospital. Sir Edmund lay in state at the Auckland Cathedral of the Holy Trinity and his funeral on 22 January 2008 at Auckland's St. Mary's Church was televised live throughout New Zealand. Hillary delivered a eulogy for his father in which he said, recalling his childhood, 'Growing up in the Hillary family, was quite an adventure... Adventure was compulsory'. On 29 February 2008, Hillary, his sister Sarah, and Sir Edmund's widow, Lady Hillary (formerly June Anderson Mulgrew) scattered most of his ashes, in a private ceremony held on Auckland's Hauraki Gulf, from the youth sail training ship Spirit of New Zealand. Apa Sherpa, who at the time had summited Everest more than anyone else, proposed a small portion of Sir Edmund's ashes should be held in reserve to be scattered on the summit of Mount Everest, and Hillary transferred them to a nearby Nepalese monastery. However, in 2010, a committee of Sherpas decided against it, concerned that it could set a precedent.

After Sir Edmund's death, there was an immediate clash between his son and his widow over the future of the Himalayan Trust that Sir Edmund had established to assist the people of Nepal, resulting in Hillary not being appointed to its board of directors. In 2010, Hillary and his sister had to get an injunction to stop Lady Hillary from having their father's watches sold through a Swiss auction house, including one that was presented to him after his Everest triumph. Hillary said he and his sister owned the watches as per their father's will. It was ruled that, under New Zealand's heritage laws, the Everest watch should never have left the country and was a violation of the Protected Objects Act. Lady Hillary had to withdraw the items from auction. Hillary then spent a year in mediation attempting to establish ownership of the watches and other items that were of great significance to the family, as Lady Hillary had given away an additional 17 items of sentimental value without consulting the family. When the courts awarded ownership of the watches to Sir Edmund's children, Hillary donated them to the Auckland War Memorial Museum. Finally, in October 2011, Lady Hillary resigned as the head of the Himalayan Trust, with five additional board members going with her.

== Mount Everest ==
Hillary has been to Everest five times, once reaching 8,300 metres on the West Ridge and twice reaching the summit by the South Col route. With his first summit of Mount Everest in 1990, he and Sir Edmund became the first father and son to achieve the feat. The 1990 expedition was led by veteran Everest climber Pete Athans, who held the record for the most summits of Everest by a Western climber.

His second ascent in May 2002 was part of a National Geographic Society expedition to mark the 50th anniversary of Sir Edmund Hillary and Tenzing Norgay's historic first ascent in 1953. The anniversary expedition brought together Peter Hillary, Jamling Norgay and Brent Bishop, the sons of Sir Edmund, Tenzing Norgay, and Barry Bishop, a member of the first successful American team to reach the summit in 1963.

== Philanthropy ==
Peter Hillary now devotes most of his time to fundraising in support of his father's Himalayan Trust, which was established in 1960 to fund capital projects in the Khumbu Valley region of Nepal. He is also a director of the Australian Himalayan Foundation.

Hillary is also the patron for the Everest Rescue Trust, a non-profit, independent trust set up to operate and manage a self-funding rescue helicopter service for the high altitude regions of Nepal.

Since 2017, Hillary has also been the Patron of the Kea Conservation Trust, a Charitable Trust set up in 2006 to support conservation and research into New Zealand's Alpine parrot, the Kea.

== Media ==
Peter Hillary has written and co-written several books, including: A Sunny Day in the Himalayas (1980); First Across the Roof of the World: The First-ever Traverse of the Himalayas – 5,000 Kilometres from Sikkim to Pakistan (with Graham Dingle, 1982); Two Generations (with his father, Sir Edmund Hillary, 1984); Ascent: Two Lives Explored: The Autobiographies of Sir Edmund and Peter Hillary (also with his father, 1986); Rimo: Mountain on the Silk Road (1992); Bridgit Was Bored (a children's book written with his first wife, Ann Moorhead, 1992); and In the Ghost Country: A Lifetime Spent on the Edge (with John Elder, 2003).

Hillary wrote the afterword for the book Letters from Everest: A First-hand Account from the Epic First Ascent by George Lowe, who was Sir Edmund Hillary's best friend and accompanied him on the 1953 Everest expedition. In the wake of the 1996 Mount Everest disaster, Hillary wrote an article for The New York Times Magazine entitled "Everest Is Mighty, We Are Fragile". He also wrote an article called "In the Name of the Father", describing what it was like on K2 in August 1995 when the mountain claimed the lives of seven summiters, leaving him as one of three survivors of that expedition.

== Awards ==
- New Zealand 1990 Commemoration Medal (1990)
- Fellow of the Royal Geographical Society (2001)
- The Explorers Club Lowell Thomas Award (2003)
- Mountain Institute Mountain Hero Award (2004)
- Circumnavigators Club Order of Magellan (2006)
- Tenzing Norgay Award for Mountaineering (2009)
