= Sarah Hillary =

New Zealand art gallery conservator

- Born: 1956 (age 69–70); Auckland
- Known for: conservation
- Style: miniatures
- Father: Edmund Hillary
- Relatives: Peter Hillary (brother)

Sarah Hillary (born 1956, Auckland) is a New Zealand art gallery conservator and artist. She is the daughter of the mountaineer Sir Edmund Hillary. In 2024 she retired as principal conservator at Auckland Art Gallery.

During 1998, there was a robbery at Auckland Art Gallery; Still on Top by James Tissot was stolen and severely damaged. The painting was restored by a team led by Hillary. She also detected a forgery of a Gottfried Lindauer painting.

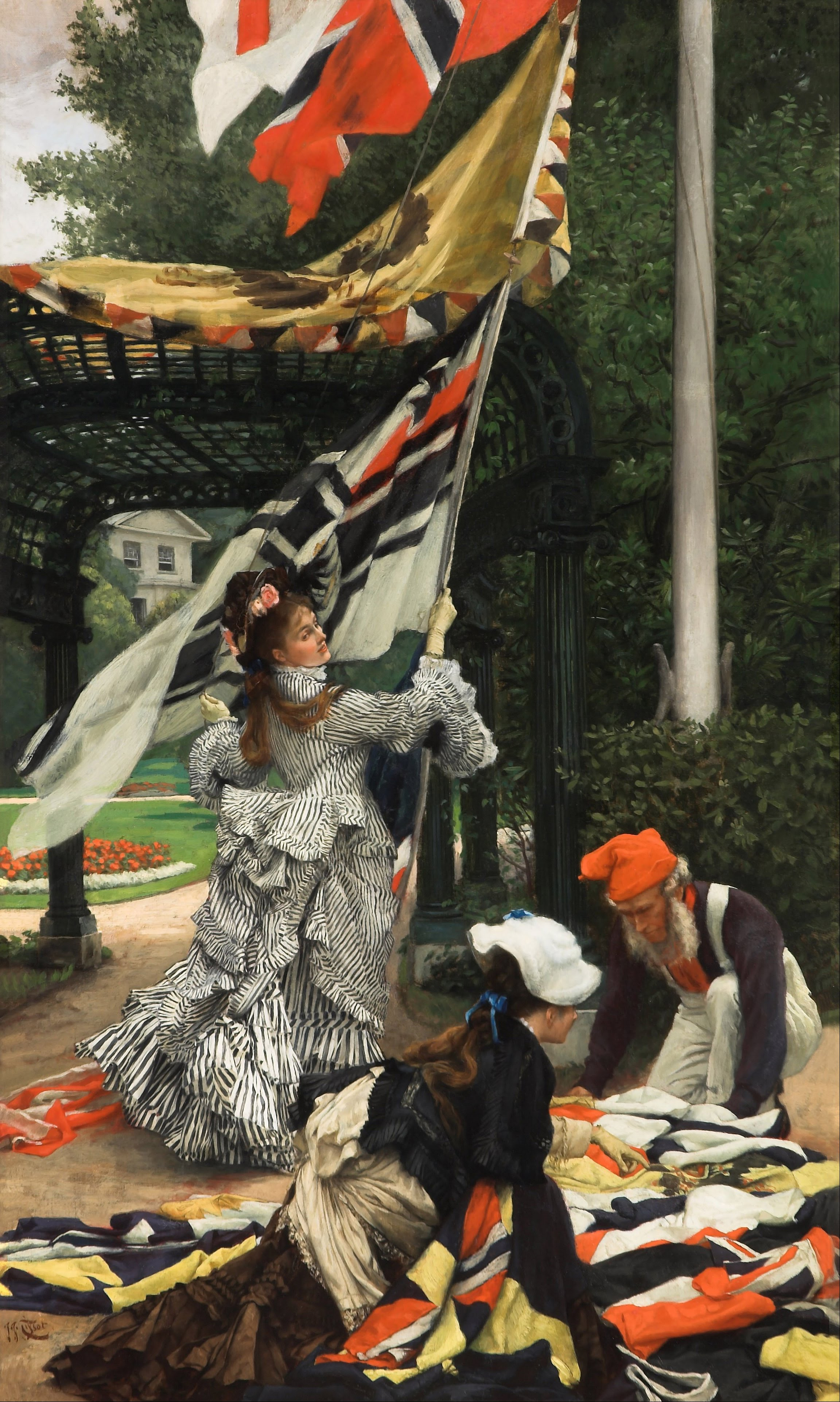
Still on top by James Tissot

In 2003, in her late forties, she began creating miniature artworks the size of matchboxes.

In 2013, Hillary treated and conserved objects for her father's exhibition, From the Summit – Hillary's Enduring Legacy at Auckland Museum.

In 2019, another notable work she conserved was Colin McCahon’s Upland Road Chapel windows, which garnered media attraction in New Zealand.

In 2024, Hillary announced her retirement after spending 40 years at the Auckland Art Gallery, over 25 years of which was as principal conservator.

== Publications ==
- The Back of the Painting: Secrets and Stories from Art Conservation (2021)
