= Colin Smith (lepidopterist) =

British lepidopterist (1936–2023)

Colin Philip Smith
- Born: 24 November 1936; London, England
- Died: 4 November 2023 (aged 86); Pokhara, Nepal
- Citizenship: Nepal
- Scientific career
- Fields: Lepidopterist; Natural history
- Workplaces: Annapurna Natural History Museum

Colin Philip Smith (24 November 1936 – 4 November 2023) was a British lepidopterist who lived and worked in Nepal. He was widely known as "Putali Bajey" (Nepali: पुतली बाजे ) or "Butterfly Grandad" in Nepal. He spent more than 50 years in Nepal studying and writing about its butterfly fauna. He is the author of several books on butterflies of Nepal. He visited Nepal in 1966 as a teacher under a United Mission to Nepal program. Smith taught some of the most popular Nepali personalities such as Baburam Bhattarai and Upendra Devkota at the start of his career.

In 2019, the Nepal government granted him honorary citizenship of Nepal for his achievements as well as international reputation. He is the third person to receive the honour after Sir Edmund Hillary and Toni Hagen, and before Um Hong-gil.

Smith died due to a gastrointestinal stromal tumor at Hariyokharka Hospital in Pokhara, on 4 November 2023. He was 87.
