= Colin Smith (English footballer, born 1951) =

English footballer (born 1951)

Personal information
- Full name: Colin Smith
- Date of birth: 30 November 1951 (age 74)
- Place of birth: Bishop Auckland, England
- Position: Defender

Youth career
- 1967–1969: Leeds United

Senior career*
Years	Team	Apps	(Gls)
1969–1971	Leeds United	0	(0)
- Stockton
- Gateshead
- Bishop Auckland
- West Auckland Town
- Shildon
1985	Darlington	2	(0)
- Shildon
- * Club domestic league appearances and goals

Colin Smith (born 30 November 1951) is an English former footballer who played as a defender in the Football League for Darlington.

Smith was born in Bishop Auckland, County Durham, and attended Bishop Auckland Grammar School. He joined Leeds United as a 15-year-old, and became an apprentice professional in 1969, but did not progress to the first team. He chose not to continue a football career, instead training as a teacher. After qualifying, he worked in special education, and played non-league football for clubs including Stockton, Gateshead, Bishop Auckland, West Auckland Town and Shildon, as well as winning the 1976 FA Sunday Cup with Brandon United.

In the 1984–85 season, he made five appearances for Football League club Darlington. Three were in the Associate Members' Cup and two – a 2–1 win at home to Peterborough United and a defeat by the same score away to Northampton Town – were in the Fourth Division.

Smith's wife, Dela Smith, was made a Dame Commander of the Order of the British Empire (DBE) in 2001 for services to education for children with special educational needs.
