= Colin Smith (Scottish footballer) =

Scottish footballer

Personal information
- Full name: Colin Smith
- Date of birth: 9 January 1951 (age 75)
- Place of birth: Springburn, Scotland
- Position: Centre forward

Senior career*
Years	Team	Apps	(Gls)
1971–1972	Queen's Park	17	(5)
1972–1974	Partick Thistle	6	(0)
1974	Stranraer	13	(3)

International career
1972	Scotland Amateurs	1	(0)
- * Club domestic league appearances and goals

Colin Smith (born 9 January 1951) is a retired amateur Scottish football centre forward who played in the Scottish League for Queen's Park, Stranraer and Partick Thistle. He was capped by Scotland at amateur level.
