= Colin S. Smith =

Evangelical pastor and author

- Born: April 27, 1958 (age 68); Edinburgh, Scotland
- Occupations: Pastor, author
- Spouse: Karen Smith

Colin S. Smith (born April 27, 1958) is an evangelical pastor and author. Smith is currently Pastor Emeritus of The Orchard Evangelical Free Church in Illinois, where he served from 1996 until 2025. The Orchard Evangelical Free Church has six campus locations: Arlington Heights, Barrington, Itasca, Marengo, Northfield and Vernon Hills.

== Biography ==
Smith was born in Edinburgh, Scotland, to George and Violet Smith. He came to faith in Christ and later felt called by God to pastoral ministry. He attended the London School of Theology where he obtained a Bachelor of Arts in theology and a Master of Philosophy. During this time he was a member of the Fellowship of Independent Evangelical Churches, where he served as its president. From 1980 to 1996, he was senior pastor of Enfield Evangelical Free Church in Enfield, UK. In 1996, Smith became the senior pastor of The Orchard Evangelical Free Church. He held the longest tenure as senior pastor in that church's history before preaching his last sermon as senior pastor on April 27th, 2025.

Smith announced his stepping down from being senior pastor of The Orchard Evangelical Free Church in January 2025 where he announced his intent to focus full time on Open the Bible. He intends to not fully withdraw from The Orchard and rather serve as Pastor Emeritus. He will be succeeded by Brad Wetherell.

Smith met his wife, Karen, at the London School of Theology. They have two sons.

== Career ==
Smith is an author and has a nationally broadcast radio program, Open the Bible. He is a council member of The Gospel Coalition, has been a speaker at Moody Bible for Founder's Week and has made several appearances on the Total Living Network.

== Selected publications ==
- Unlocking the Bible, an evangelistic teaching package consisting of books, audio books, study guides, and video teachings
- 10 Keys for Unlocking the Bible (2002) ISBN 978-0-8024-6547-4
- Unlock the Bible in 30 Days (2004) ISBN 978-0-8024-6555-9
- 10 Keys to Unlock the Christian Life (2005) ISBN 978-0-8024-6556-6
- The 10 Greatest Struggles of Your Life (2006) ISBN 978-0-8024-6557-3
- Jonah: Navigating a God-Centered Life (2012) ISBN 978-1-8455-0639-1
- The One Year Unlocking the Bible Devotional (2012) ISBN 978-1-4143-6935-8
- Heaven, How I Got Here: The Story of the thief on the Cross (2015) ISBN 978-1-7819-1558-5
- Momentum: Pursuing God's Blessings Through the Beatitudes (2016) ISBN 978-0-8024-1386-4
