= Colin Smith (hymnwriter) =

Australian composer (1928–2005)

- Born: Colin Declan Smith; 10 June 1928; Perth, Australia
- Died: 23 October 2005 (aged 77); Sydney, Australia
- Occupations: Religious, hymnodist

Colin Declan Smith (10 June 1928 – 23 October 2005) was an Australian Christian Brother and hymnodist.

== Early life ==
Smith was born on 10 June 1928 in Perth, Western Australia, and began his interest in liturgical music as a choir boy at St Mary's Cathedral, Perth.

== Sacred music ==
Smith's output of liturgical music includes settings of the Psalms for the three-year liturgical cycle of Masses, several settings of the Ordinary of the Mass, two collections of hymns, and other sacred works including a choral arrangement of O God, our help in ages past. Arguably Colin's signature work is the Mass Shalom, originally composed in 1977 and one of the only Australian Mass settings popular before the revision of the English translation of the Mass to be reworked for the 2010 translation. As Colin had died some five years earlier, the revisions were the work of Paul Mason.

He was also the director of the John Paul Singers, a Catholic sacred choir formed for the Papal Visit of Pope John Paul II, until May 2005, shortly before his death, when he handed the baton to Donrita Reefman, who in turn passed on the baton to Julie Spencer in September 2014.

== Death and legacy ==
Brother Colin Smith died in Sydney, Australia on Sunday 23 October 2005 at the age of 77; after his death, Christian Brothers medium Edmund Rice Online described Colin as having given a "huge contribution to liturgical music in Australia". His funeral took place at St Mary's Church in Concord on Saturday 29 October 2005.

In October 2015, Brother Colin Smith was remembered by workshops and concerts held in Sydney and Melbourne to mark the tenth anniversary of his death.
