= Toni Hagen =

Swiss geologist (1917–2003)

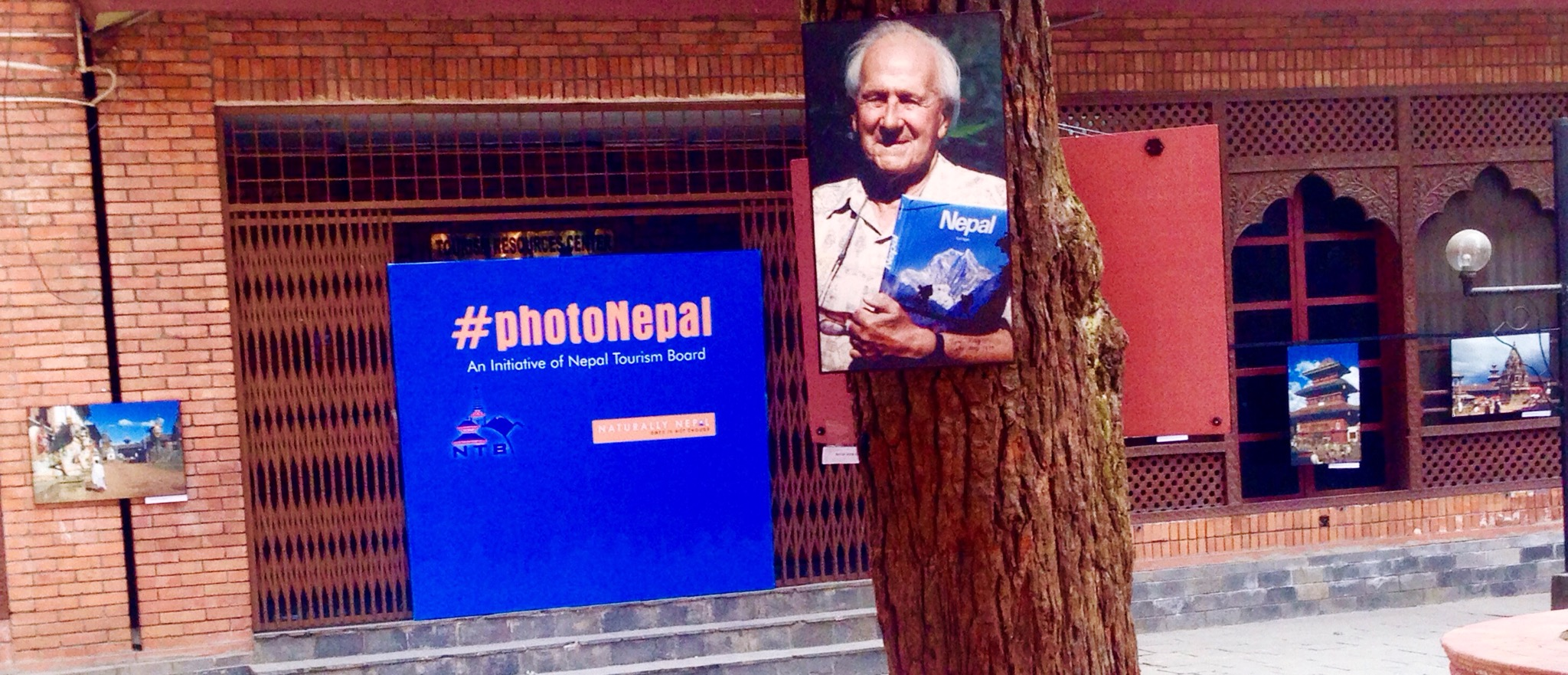
- Born: 17 August 1917
- Died: 18 April 2003 (aged 85); Lenzerheide
- Citizenship: Switzerland and Nepal (honorary)
- Known for: First foreigner to travel Nepal.
- Spouse: Gertrud
- Children: 1 son and 2 daughters

Toni Hagen (17 August 1917 in Luzern – 18 April 2003 in Lenzerheide) was a Swiss origin Nepalese geologist and a pioneer of Swiss development assistance.

== Education ==
After taking a diploma in engineering and geology from the Swiss Federal Institute of Technology in Zurich, he took a doctorate in the geology of the Welsh mountains and then became a research assistant at the Zurich Geological Institute.

Hagen first visited Nepal in 1950 with a first Swiss development assistance mission. In 1952 he was employed by the government of Nepal and also worked for the United Nations. He explored the geography of that Himalayan state.

== Career ==
Dr. Hagen was the first foreigner to trek throughout Nepal during geological and geographic survey work and mapping on behalf of the United Nations. He walked over 14,000 km walking several times across Nepal, where the topography is mostly hilly to snow-covered. He filmed Nepalese cultural and ethnic diversity originally as produced as a silent documentary, and later with an English narration in his own voice. Dr. Hagen is also the author of several books including a book entitled Nepal (ISBN 99933 13 03 3; LCCN 99937099)

From 1966 to 1971, as adviser to the UN's Development Program, he was given a special mission in crisis-hit areas worldwide including Africa, the Middle East and Asia. Hagen was a pioneer in the field of development aid, undertaking missions to the Himalayas, eastern Africa and South America in a career spanning over 60 years.

After Tibet was taken over by China in 1959, Hagen used his influence to help the Tibetan refugees. During the next years he gained 14th Dalai Lama's confidence. He managed to bring approximately 1,000–1,500 Tibetans to Switzerland.

Hagen retired from the UN in 1972, worked as a freelance adviser for organisations involved in foreign aid and later returned to the Federal Institute of Technology at Zurich where he lectured on the problems of the developing world. In the early 1980s he established the Toni Hagen Foundation in Switzerland and Nepal to promote democratic reforms and better understanding between different ethnic groups in Nepal.

== Film Production ==
In 1999 Dr. Toni Hagen filmed a story of his life, The Ring of the Buddha (German title: Der Ring des Buddha), which also included some original materials from the 1960s. Soon after the film was shown, he died in early 2003 at the age of 85 in his home in Lucerne on Good Friday, three days after his wife, Gertrud in Lenzerheide.
