= Edmund Hillary =

New Zealand mountaineer (1919–2008)

Sir Edmund Hillary KG ONZ KBE
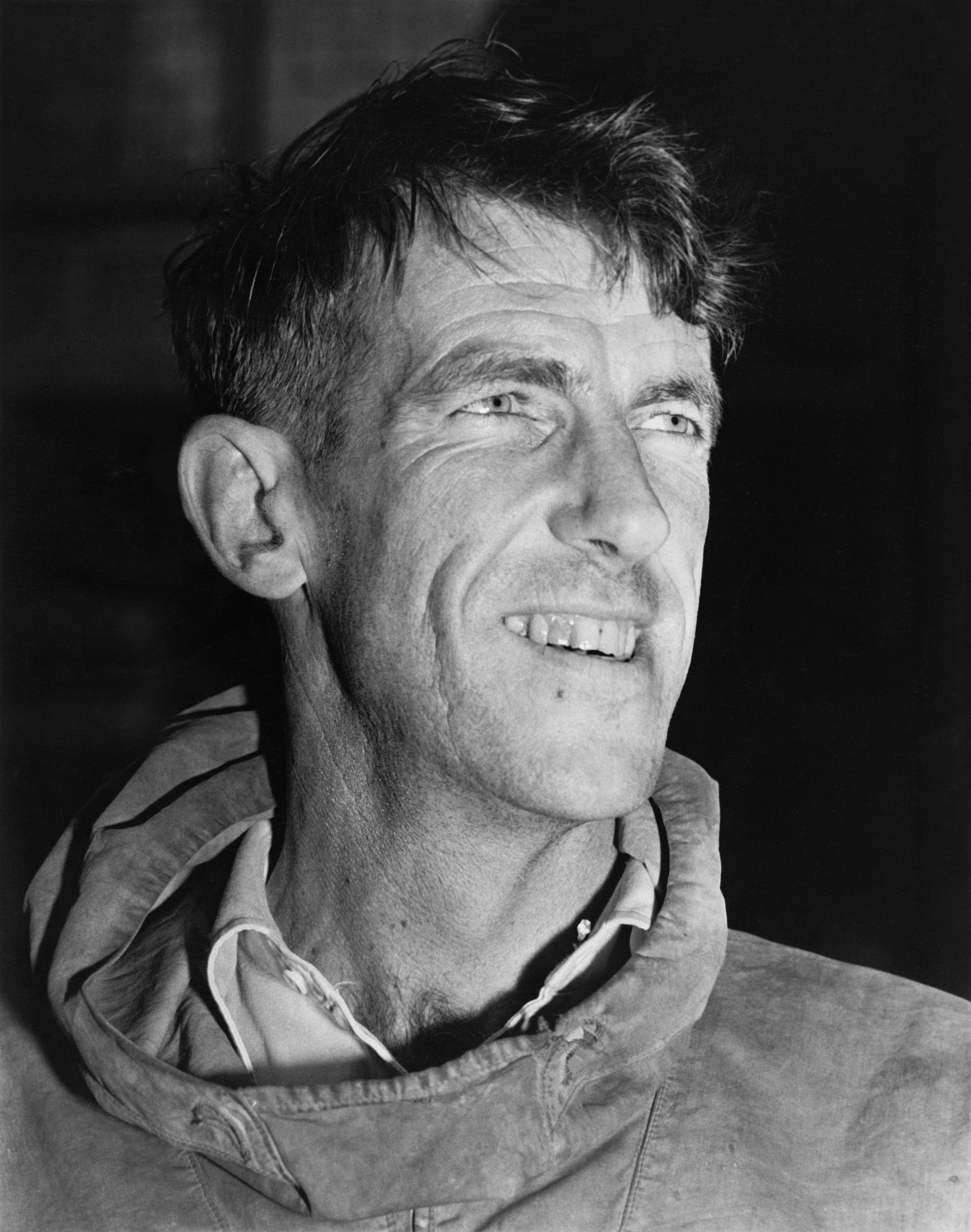
- Hillary in c. 1953
- Born: Edmund Percival Hillary; 20 July 1919; Auckland, New Zealand
- Died: 11 January 2008 (aged 88); Auckland, New Zealand
- Citizenship: New Zealander (by birth); Nepalese (honorary, 2003)
- Known for: With Tenzing Norgay, first to reach summit of Mount Everest
- Spouses: Louise Mary Rose (m. 1953; died 1975) June Mulgrew (m. 1989)
- Children: 3, including Peter and Sarah
- Military career
- Branch: Royal New Zealand Air Force
- Service years: 1943–1945
- Rank: Sergeant
- Units: No. 6 Squadron RNZAF; No. 5 Squadron RNZAF
- Conflicts: World War II

Sir Edmund Percival Hillary (20 July 1919 – 11 January 2008) was a New Zealand mountaineer, explorer, and philanthropist. On 29 May 1953, he and Tenzing Norgay became the first climbers confirmed to have reached the summit of Mount Everest. They were part of the ninth British expedition to Everest, which was led by John Hunt. From 1985 to 1988, he served as New Zealand's High Commissioner to India and Bangladesh and concurrently as Ambassador to Nepal.

Hillary became interested in mountaineering while in secondary school. He made his first major climb in 1939, reaching the summit of Mount Ollivier. He served in the Royal New Zealand Air Force as a navigator during World War II and was wounded in an accident. Prior to the Everest expedition, Hillary had been part of the British reconnaissance expedition to the mountain in 1951 as well as an unsuccessful attempt to climb Cho Oyu in 1952.

As part of the Commonwealth Trans-Antarctic Expedition, Hillary reached the South Pole overland in 1958. He subsequently reached the North Pole, making him the first person to reach both poles and summit Everest. Time named him one of the 100 most influential people of the 20th century.

Beginning in 1960, Hillary devoted himself to assisting the Sherpa people of Nepal through the Himalayan Trust, which he established. His efforts are credited with the construction of many schools and hospitals in Nepal. Hillary had numerous honours conferred upon him, including the Order of the Garter in 1995. Upon his death in 2008, he was given a state funeral in New Zealand.

== Early life ==
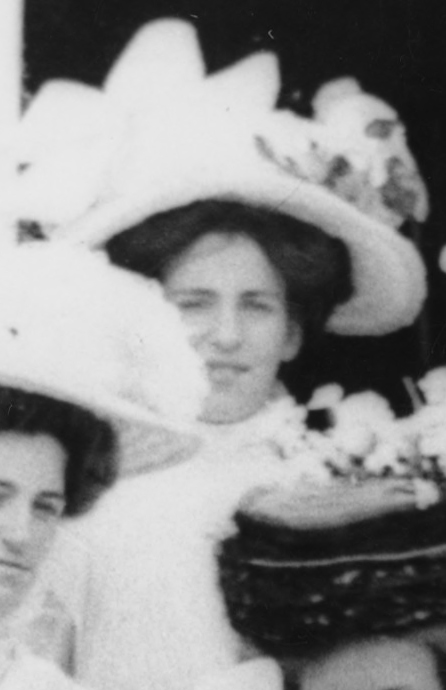
Hillary's mother Gertrude Clark, 1909

Hillary was born to Percival Augustus "Percy" (1885–1965) and Gertrude (née Clark) (1892–1965) Hillary in Auckland, New Zealand, on 20 July 1919. His father Percy had served at Gallipoli with the 15th (North Auckland) Regiment, and was discharged "medically unfit" from the Army in 1916; he had married Gertrude after his return to New Zealand. His grandfather Edmund Raymond Hillary (b. 1836) from Lancashire, England, was a watchmaker, who immigrated to the northern Wairoa region in the mid-19th century. He married Annie "Ida" Fleming from Ireland having four children. His maternal great-grandparents, the Clarks, were both from Yorkshire.

His family moved to Tuakau, south of Auckland, in 1920, after Percy was allocated eight acres (3.2 ha) of land there as a returned soldier. Percy had been a journalist prewar, and soon became founding editor of the weekly Tuakau District News as well as an apiarist. Ed had a sister June (born 1917) and a brother Rexford Fleming "Rex" (born 1920).

Hillary was educated at Tuakau Primary School and then Auckland Grammar School. He finished primary school aged 11, or two years early, and at "Grammar" achieved average marks. His mother wanted him to go to a "good school", and he commuted by train, cycling to Tuakau station before 7 am and returning after 6 pm for 3 1/2 years (a one-hour, 40-minute journey each way) until the family moved to Remuera, Auckland, in 1935, his last of four years at Grammar.

He was initially smaller than his peers and shy, and did not enjoy "Grammar", where commuting barred him from after-school activities. He grew to be 6 feet 2 inches (188 cm) and gained confidence after taking up boxing.

He became interested in climbing when he was 16 following a 1935 school trip to Mount Ruapehu, after which he showed more interest in tramping than in studying and said he "wanted to see the world". He then attended Auckland University College, and joined the Tramping Club there. But in 1938, "after two notably unsuccessful years studying mathematics and science" he gave up on formal education.

He then became an apiarist with his father and brother Rex; with 1600 hives to attend, thousands of 90 lb (41 kg) boxes of honey comb to handle, and 12 to 100 bee-stings daily. He kept bees in summer, and concentrated on climbing in winter. His father also edited the journal "The N.Z. Honeybee" and his mother Gertrude was famous for breeding and selling queen bees.

In 1938, he went to hear Herbert Sutcliffe, the proponent of a life philosophy called "Radiant Living", with his family. The family all became foundation members, and his mother became its secretary in 1939. He went to Gisborne as Sutcliffe's assistant, and in 1941 sat examinations to become a teacher of Radiant Living, getting a 100% pass mark. His test lecture was on "Inferiority – cause and cure". He said of his five-year association with the movement that "I learned to speak confidently from the platform; to think more freely on important topics; to mix more readily with a wide variety of people". Tenets included healthy eating (the salads that June took to university for lunch) and pacificism. He joined the Radiant Living Tramping Club, and further developed his love of the outdoors in the Waitākere Ranges.

In 1939, he completed his first major climb, reaching the summit of Mount Ollivier, near Aoraki / Mount Cook in the Southern Alps. Climbing brought new friends; Harry Ayres and George Lowe became "the first real friends I'd ever had".

== World War II ==
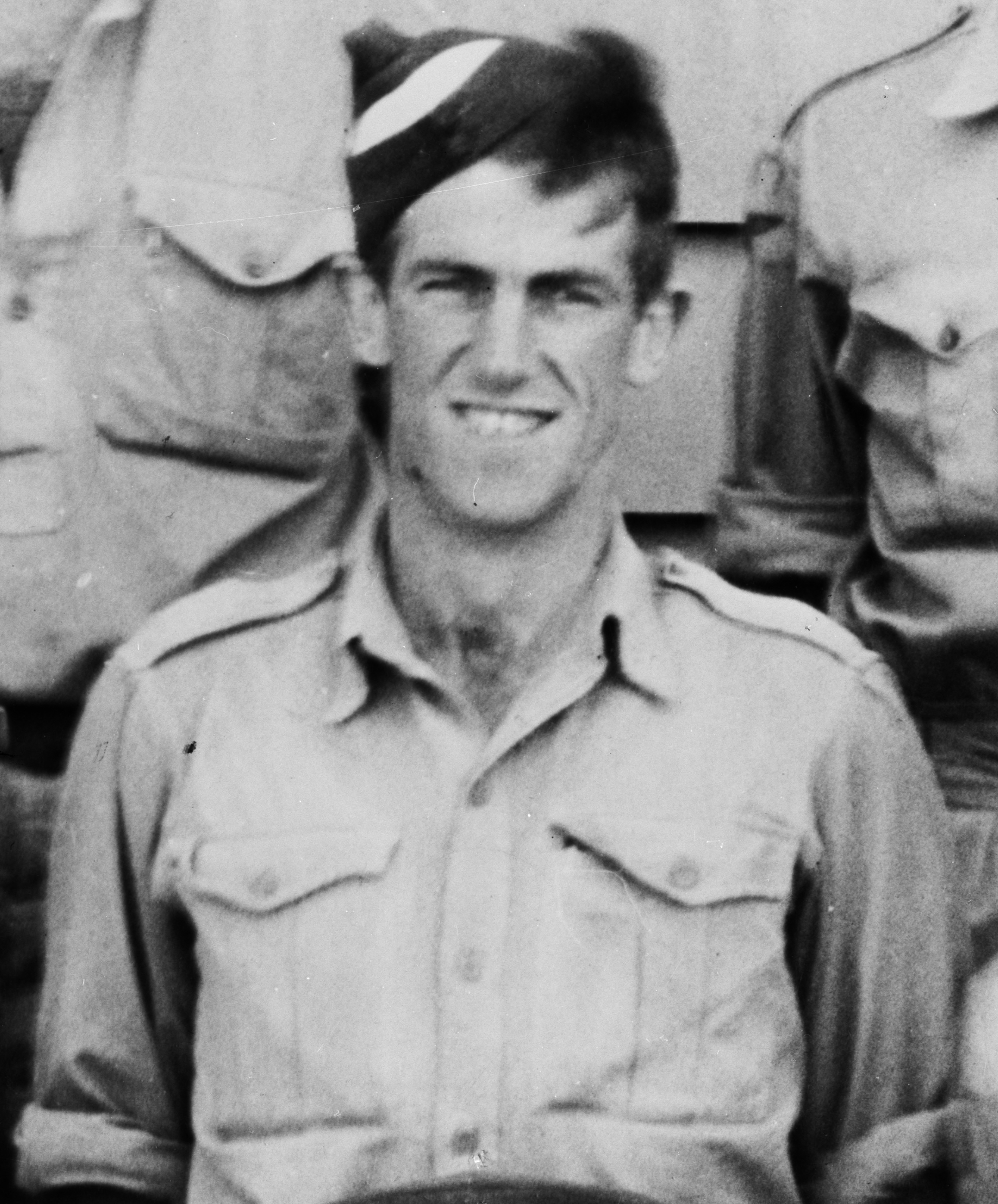
Hillary in Royal New Zealand Air Force uniform at Delta Camp, near Blenheim, New Zealand, during World War II

At the outbreak of World War II, Hillary applied to join the Royal New Zealand Air Force (RNZAF) but quickly withdrew the application, later writing that he was "harassed by [his] religious conscience". In 1943, with the Japanese threat in the Pacific and the arrival of conscription, he joined the RNZAF as a navigator in No. 6 Squadron RNZAF and later No. 5 Squadron RNZAF on Catalina flying boats. In 1945, he was sent to Fiji and to the Solomon Islands, where he was badly burnt in an accident.

== Expeditions ==
In January 1948, Hillary and others ascended the south ridge of Aoraki / Mount Cook, New Zealand's highest peak. He took part in an arduous rescue on La Perouse in 1948, befriending fellow climber Norman Hardie.

In 1951 he was part of the British reconnaissance expedition to Everest led by Eric Shipton. (Note: Shipton had met Dan Bryant on the 1935 British Mount Everest reconnaissance expedition and had formed a positive view of New Zealand climbers) Hillary climbed with Shipton sufficiently far up Pumori to gain the first clear view of the full extent of the Western Cwm, and identify what became the standard Nepalese route to the summit of Everest. Subsequently with Shipton and others he attempted two crossings of the Khumbu icefall, the latter reaching the beginning of the Western Cwm.

In 1952, Hillary and George Lowe were part of the British team, again led by Shipton, that attempted Cho Oyu. After that attempt was abandoned due to the lack of a good route from the Nepal side, Hillary and Lowe with three sherpas crossed the Nup La pass into Tibet and reached Everest's north side, the scene of all pre-war British expeditions. Going up the East Rongbuk glacier, they visited sites of the pre-war camps, reaching Camp III sited below the slopes leading to the North Col. After this, the team ascended the Changtse Glacier and made an attempt on Changtse, attaining approximately 22,000 ft (6,700 m). Following this they went back through Nup La, before meeting up with Shipton in Namche Bazaar.

=== 1953 Everest expedition ===
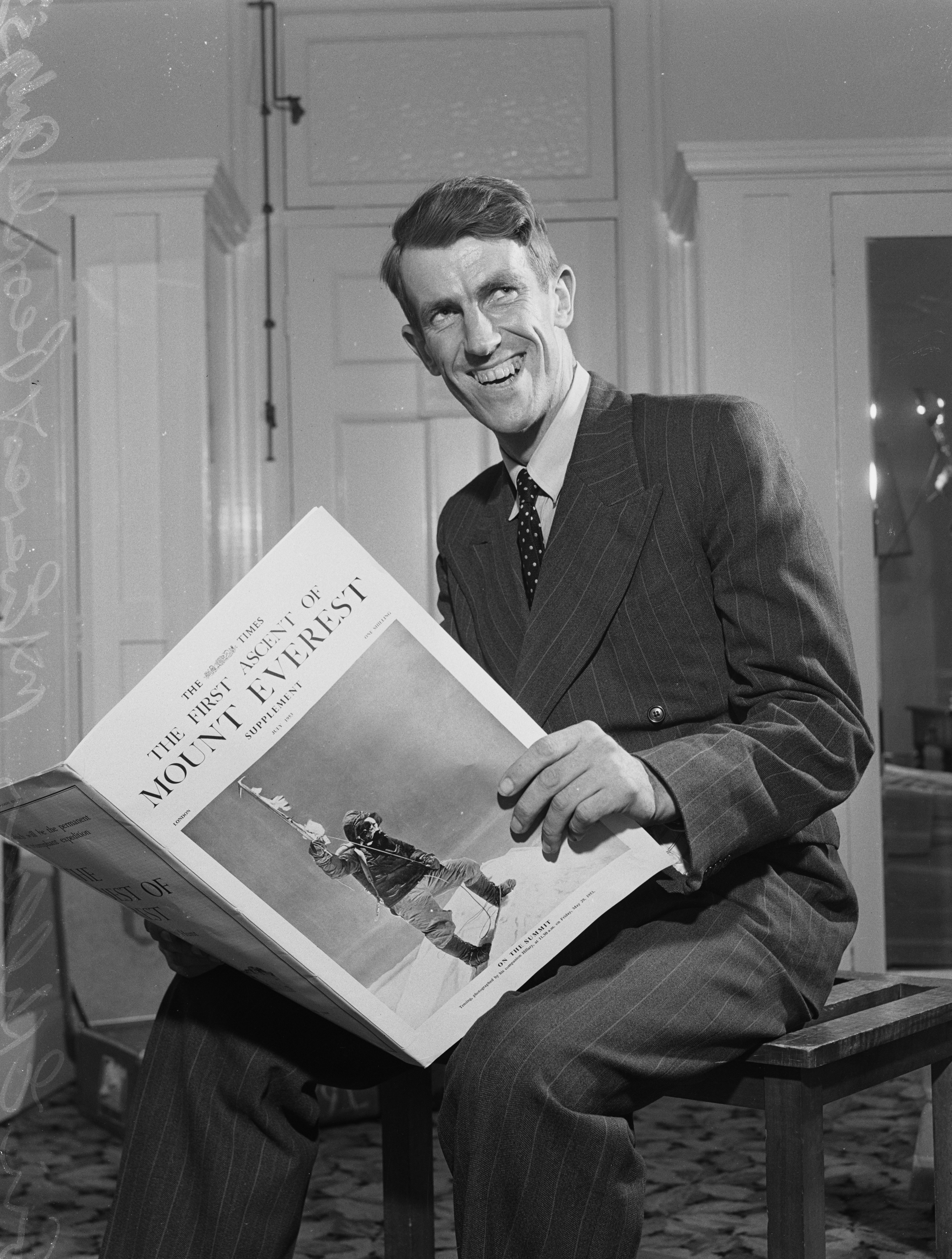
Portrait of Hillary, Australia, July 1953

In 1949, the long-standing climbing route to the summit of Everest was closed by Chinese-controlled Tibet. For the next several years, Nepal allowed only one or two expeditions per year. A Swiss expedition (in which Tenzing took part) attempted to reach the summit in 1952, but was forced back by bad weather and problems with oxygen sets 800 feet (240 m) below the summit.

External audio
- Sir Edmund Hillary Scales the Heights of Literary Society, 1954, Hillary speaks 5:00–18:57, WNYC

In 1952, Hillary learned that he and Lowe had been invited by the Joint Himalayan Committee for the 1953 British attempt and immediately accepted. Shipton had been named as leader but was replaced by Hunt. Hillary objected but was immediately impressed by Hunt's energy and determination. Hunt asked Charles Evans and Hillary to form with him a small three-man planning group on the expedition. Hunt wrote that:

Hillary's testing in the Himalayas had shown that he would be a very strong contender, not only for Everest, but for an eventual summit party. When I met Shipton last autumn I well remember his prophesying this – and how right he was. Quite exceptionally strong and abounding in a restless energy, possessed of a thrusting mind which swept away all unproven obstacles, Ed Hillary's personality had made an imprint on my mind, through his Cho Oyu and Reconnaissance friends and through his letters to me.

Hillary had hoped to climb with Lowe, but Hunt named two teams for the ascent: Tom Bourdillon and Charles Evans; and Hillary and Tenzing. Hillary, therefore, made a concerted effort to forge a working friendship with Tenzing. Hillary wrote, "Tenzing had substantially greater personal ambition than any Sherpa I had met."

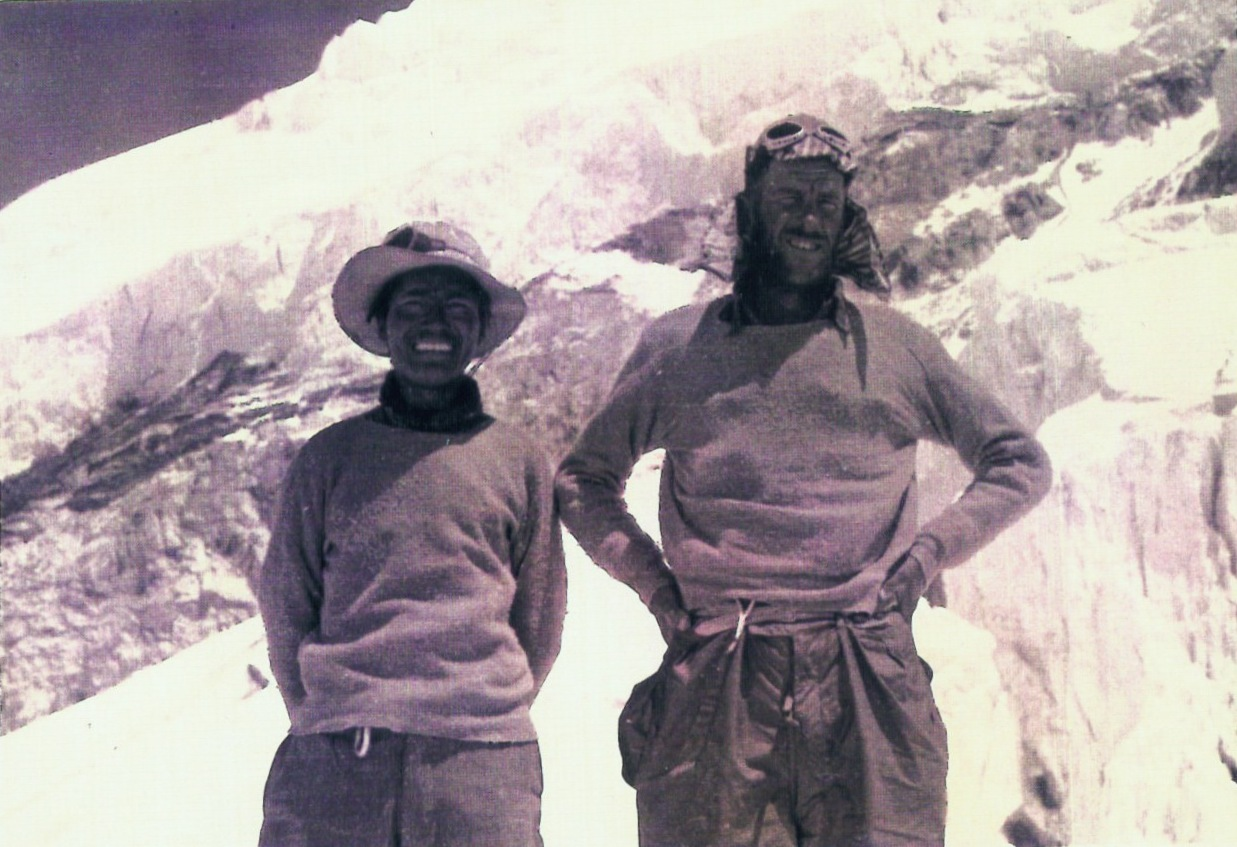
Tenzing and Hillary

The Hunt expedition totalled over 400 people, including 362 porters, 20 Sherpa guides, and 10,000 pounds (4,500 kg) of baggage. Lowe supervised the preparation of the Lhotse Face, a huge and steep ice face, for climbing. Hillary forged a route through the treacherous Khumbu Icefall.

Cameraman Tom Stobart was Hillary's room-mate in Kathmandu. He described Hillary as:

a skeleton as tall as I was ... a hatchet-thin face, and seemed tied together with steel ... I had just got a rubber torch to pieces and couldn't get it together again. This human machine took charge. 'Let's give it a go' he said, using an expression we came to know so well in the following months. It may have meant that he would try to fix it, but did not. Actually it meant he would fix it, a subtle but important difference so far as Ed and his fellow countryman George Lowe, were concerned.

The expedition set up base camp in March 1953 and, working slowly, set up its final camp at the South Col at 25,900 feet (7,890 m). On 26 May, Bourdillon and Evans attempted the climb but turned back when Evans's oxygen system failed. The pair had reached the South Summit, coming within 300 vertical feet (91 m) of the summit. Hunt then directed Hillary and Tenzing to attempt the summit.

Snow and wind delayed them at the South Col for two days. They set out on 28 May with the support of Lowe, Alfred Gregory, and Ang Nyima. The two pitched a tent at 27,900 feet (8,500 m) on 28 May, while their support group returned down the mountain. On the following morning Hillary discovered that his boots had frozen solid outside the tent. He spent two hours warming them over a stove before he and Tenzing, wearing 30-pound (14 kg) packs, attempted the final ascent. The final obstacle was the 40-foot (12 m) rock face later called "Hillary Step"; Hillary later wrote:

I noticed a crack between the rock and the snow sticking to the East Face. I crawled inside and wriggled and jammed my way to the top ... Tenzing slowly joined me and we moved on. I chopped steps over bump after bump, wondering a little desperately where the top could be. Then I saw the ridge ahead dropped away to the north and above me on the right was a rounded snow dome. A few more whacks with my ice-axe and Tenzing and I stood on top of Everest.

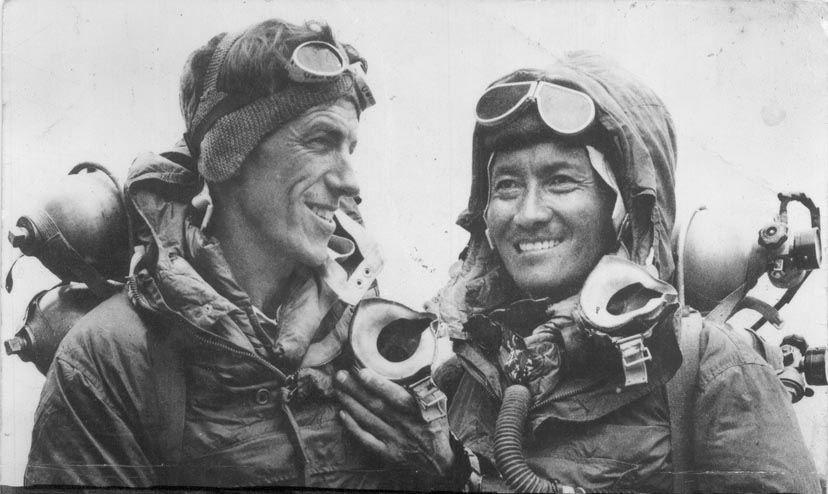
Hillary and Tenzing on return from the summit of Everest

Tenzing wrote in his 1955 autobiography that Hillary took the first step onto the summit and he followed. They reached Everest's 29,028 ft (8,848 m) summit – the highest point on earth – at 11:30 am.

They spent about 15 minutes at the summit. Hillary took a photo of Tenzing posing with his ice-axe, but there is no photo of Hillary; Tenzing's autobiography says that Hillary simply declined to have his picture taken. They also took photos looking down the mountain.

Tenzing left chocolates at the summit as an offering, and Hillary left a cross given to him by John Hunt. Their descent was complicated by drifting snow that had covered their tracks. The first person they met was Lowe; Hillary said, "Well, George, we knocked the bastard off."

They returned to Kathmandu a few days later and learned that Hillary had already been appointed a Knight Commander of the Order of the British Empire and Hunt a Knight Bachelor. News reached Britain on the day of Queen Elizabeth II's coronation, and the press called it a coronation gift. The 37 members of the party later received the Queen Elizabeth II Coronation Medal with mount everest expedition engraved along the rim. In addition to the knighting of Hillary and Hunt, Tenzing – ineligible for knighthood as a Nepalese citizen – received the George Medal. Tenzing also received the Star of Nepal from King Tribhuvan.

=== After Everest ===
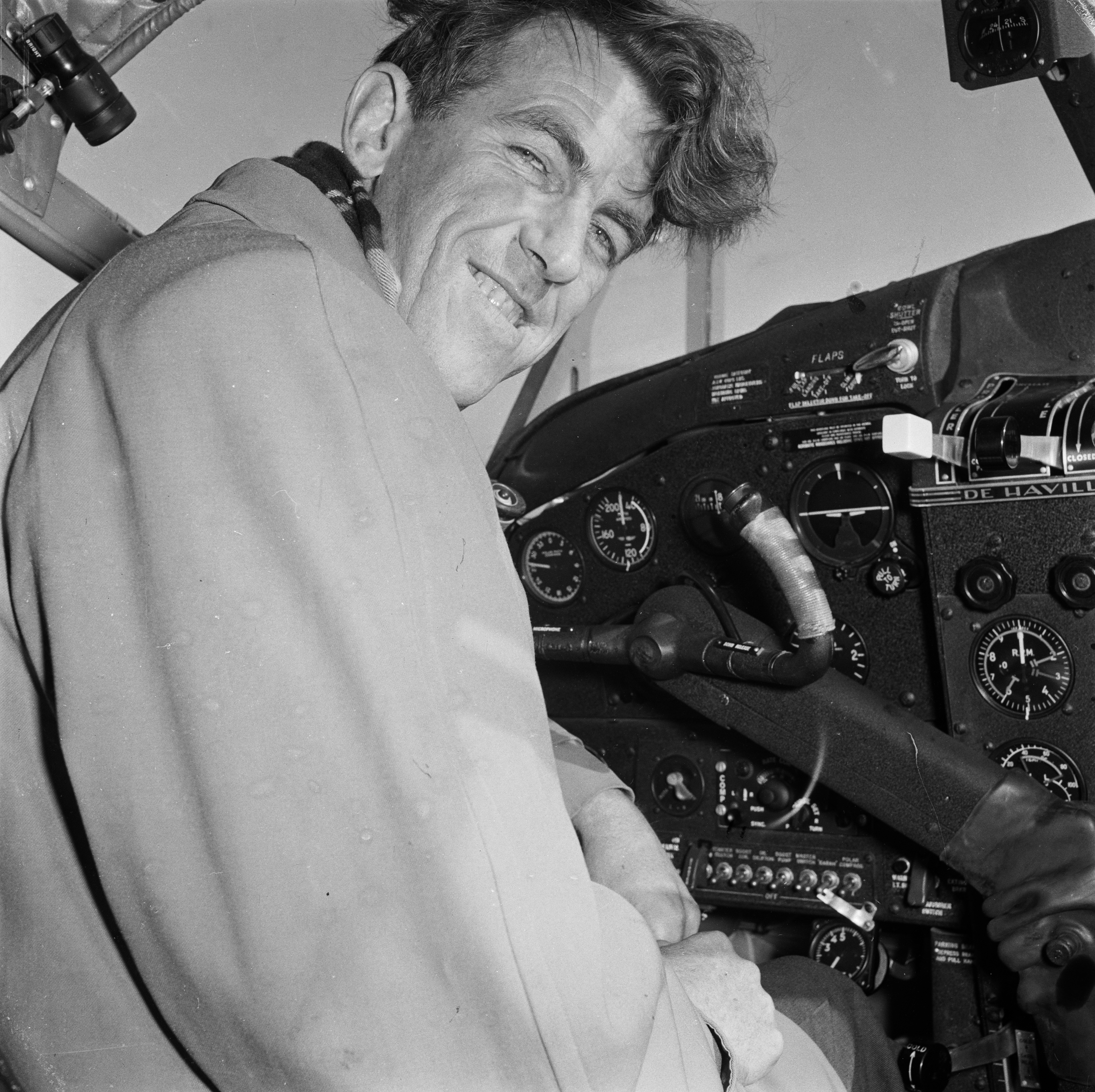
In the cockpit of the Commonwealth Trans-Antarctic Expedition's DHC-2, 1956

Hillary climbed ten other peaks in the Himalayas on further visits in 1956, 1960–1961, and 1963–1965. He also reached the South Pole as part of the Commonwealth Trans-Antarctic Expedition, for which he led the New Zealand section, on 4 January 1958. His party was the first to reach the Pole overland since Amundsen in 1911 and Scott in 1912, and the first ever to do so using motor vehicles.

In 1960, Hillary organised the 1960–61 Silver Hut expedition, with Griffith Pugh; and Pugh showed that Mount Everest could be climbed without oxygen, with a long period of acclimatisation by living at 20,000 feet (6,100 m) for six months. An assault on Makalu, the world's fifth-highest mountain, was unsuccessful. Hillary was with the expedition for five months, although it lasted for ten.

The expedition also searched for the fabled abominable snowman. No evidence of Yetis was found, instead footprints and tracks were proven to be from other causes. During the expedition, Hillary travelled to remote temples which contained "Yeti scalps"; however after bringing back three relics, two were shown to be from bears and one from a goat antelope. Hillary said after the expedition: "The yeti is not a strange, superhuman creature as has been imagined. We have found rational explanations for most yeti phenomena".

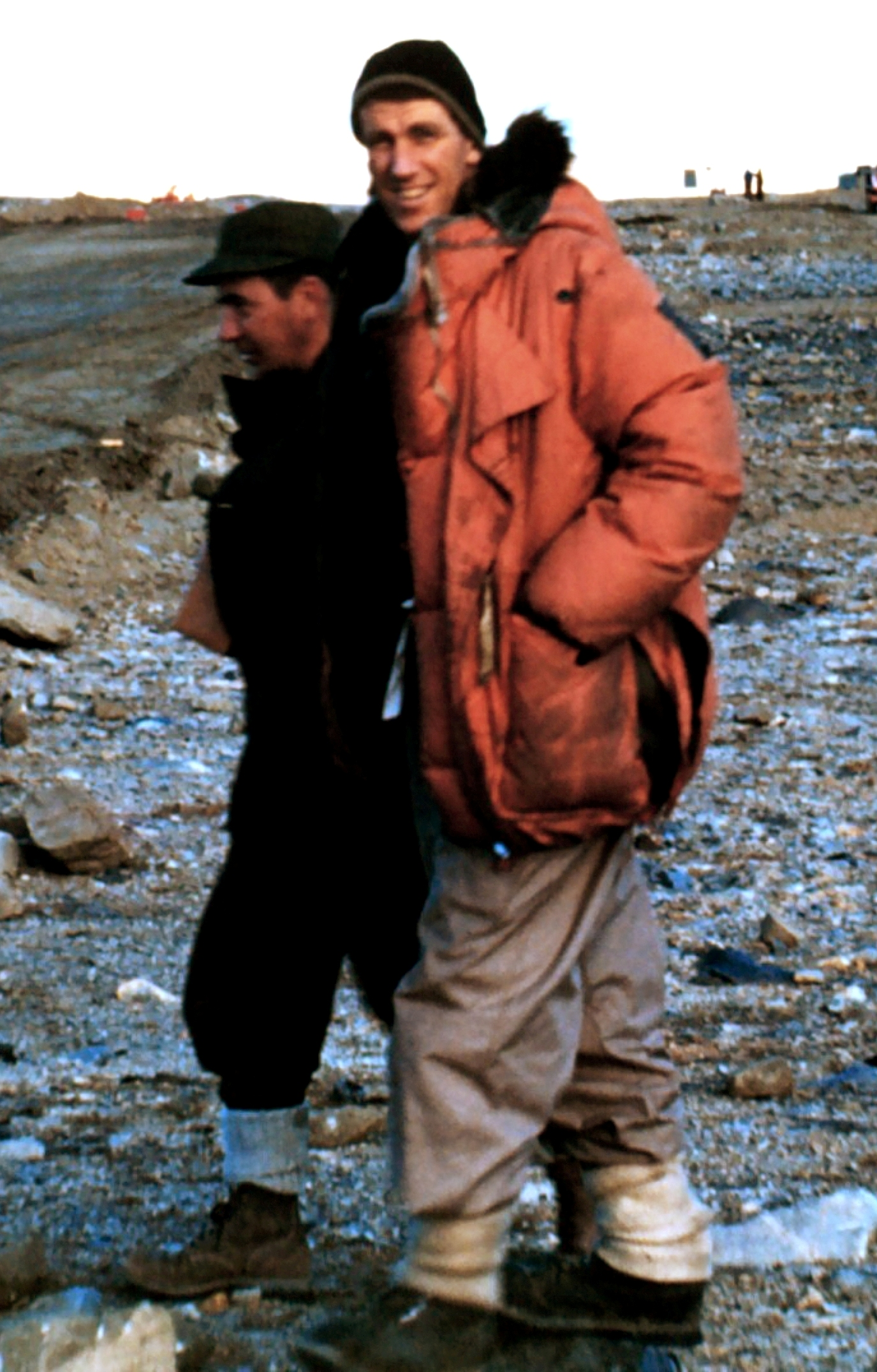
Hillary in 1957 after accompanying the first plane to land at the Marble Point ground air strip, Antarctica

In 1962, he was a guest on the television game show What's My Line?; he stumped the panel, comprising Dorothy Kilgallen, Arlene Francis, Bennett Cerf, and Merv Griffin. In 1977, he led a jetboat expedition, titled "Ocean to Sky", from the mouth of the Ganges River to its source. From 1977 to 1979 he commentated aboard Antarctic sightseeing flights operated by Air New Zealand, and was scheduled to act as the guide for the fatal Flight 901, but had to cancel owing to other commitments. In 1985, he accompanied Neil Armstrong in a small twin-engined ski plane over the Arctic Ocean and landed at the North Pole. Hillary thus became the first man to stand at both poles and on the summit of Everest. This accomplishment inspired generations of explorers to compete over what later was defined as Three Poles Challenge. In January 2007, Hillary travelled to Antarctica as part of a delegation commemorating the 50th anniversary of the founding of Scott Base.

== Honours and public recognition ==
Hillary on the New Zealand five-dollar note

On 6 June 1953, Hillary was appointed a Knight Commander of the Order of the British Empire (KBE), and later that year received the Queen Elizabeth II Coronation Medal, bearing the additional inscription 'Mount Everest Expedition'. On 6 February 1987, he became the fourth individual appointed a Member of the Order of New Zealand (ONZ). He also received the Polar Medal in 1958 for his role in the Commonwealth Trans‑Antarctic Expedition; was awarded a Commander of the Order of Sports Merit of France around 1960; made a Member 1st Class of the Order of Gorkha Dakshina Bahu of the Kingdom of Nepal in 1953; and received the 1975 Coronation Medal of King Birendra of Nepal. On 22 April 1995, Hillary was appointed a Knight Companion of the Most Noble Order of the Garter (KG). On 17 June 2004, Hillary was awarded the Commander's Cross of the Order of Merit of the Republic of Poland. The Government of India conferred on him its second-highest civilian award, the Padma Vibhushan, posthumously, in 2008.

To mark the 50th anniversary of the first successful ascent of Everest, the Nepalese government conferred honorary citizenship upon Hillary at a special Golden Jubilee celebration in Kathmandu, Nepal. He was the first foreign national to receive that honour.

Since 1992, New Zealand's $5 note has featured Hillary's portrait, making him the only living person not a current head of state ever to appear on a New Zealand banknote. In giving his permission, Hillary insisted that Aoraki / Mount Cook rather than Mount Everest be used as the backdrop.

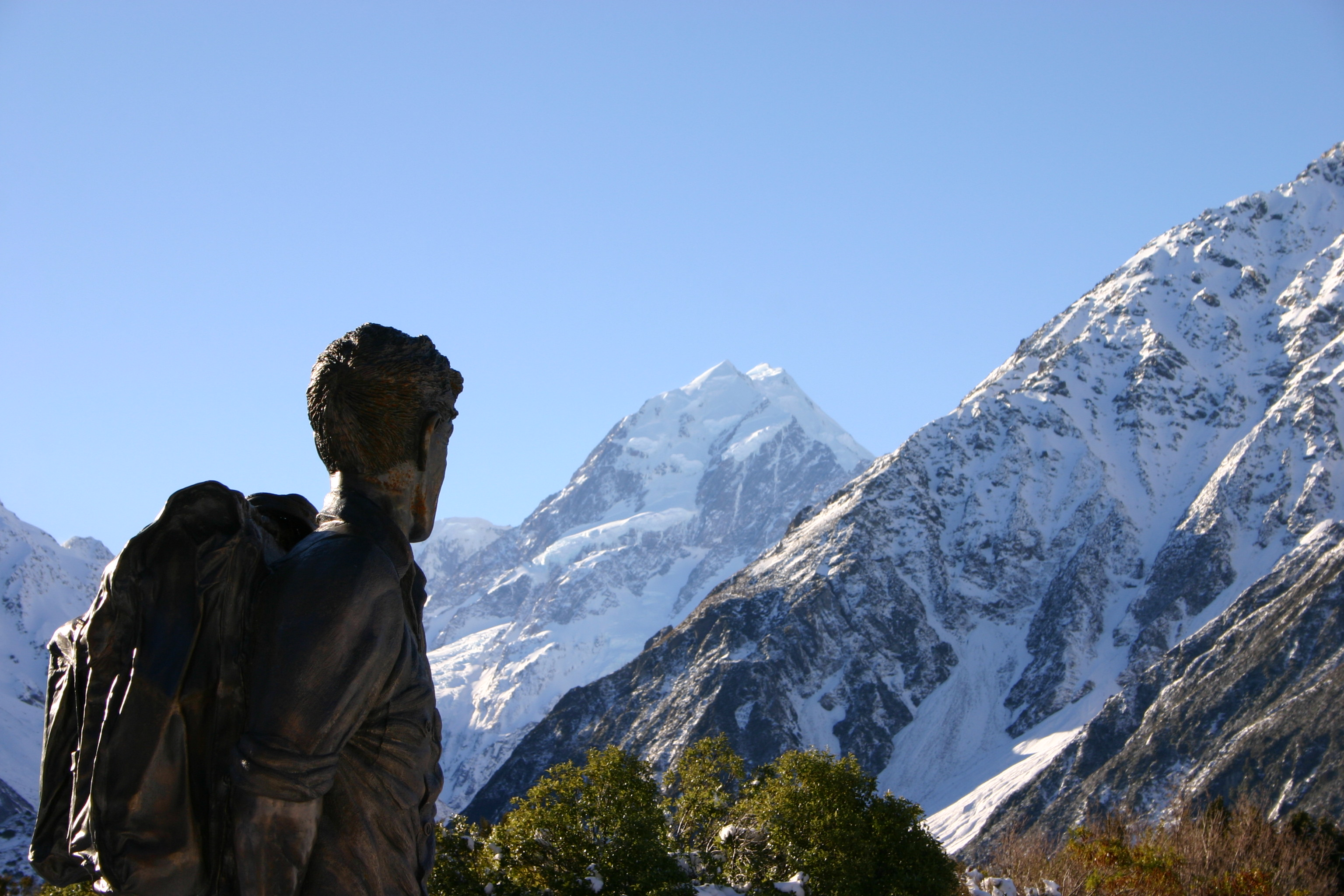
Statue of Hillary gazing towards Aoraki / Mount Cook, one of his favourite peaks

Annual Reader's Digest polls from 2005 to 2007 named Hillary as "New Zealand's most trusted individual".

Hillary's favoured New Zealand charity was the Sir Edmund Hillary Outdoor Pursuits Centre, of which he was patron for 35 years. He was particularly keen on how this organisation introduced young New Zealanders to the outdoors in a very similar way to his first experience of a school trip to Mt Ruapehu at the age of 16. A 2.3-metre (7.5 ft) bronze statue of Hillary was erected outside The Hermitage Hotel at Mount Cook Village; it was unveiled by Hillary himself in 2003. Various streets, institutions and organisations around New Zealand and abroad are named after him – for example, the Sir Edmund Hillary Collegiate in Ōtara, which was established by Hillary in 2001.

Two Antarctic features are named after Hillary. The Hillary Coast is a section of coastline south of Ross Island and north of the Shackleton Coast. The Hillary Canyon, an undersea feature in the Ross Sea, appears on the General Bathymetric Chart of the Oceans, published by the International Hydrographic Organization.

== Personal life ==
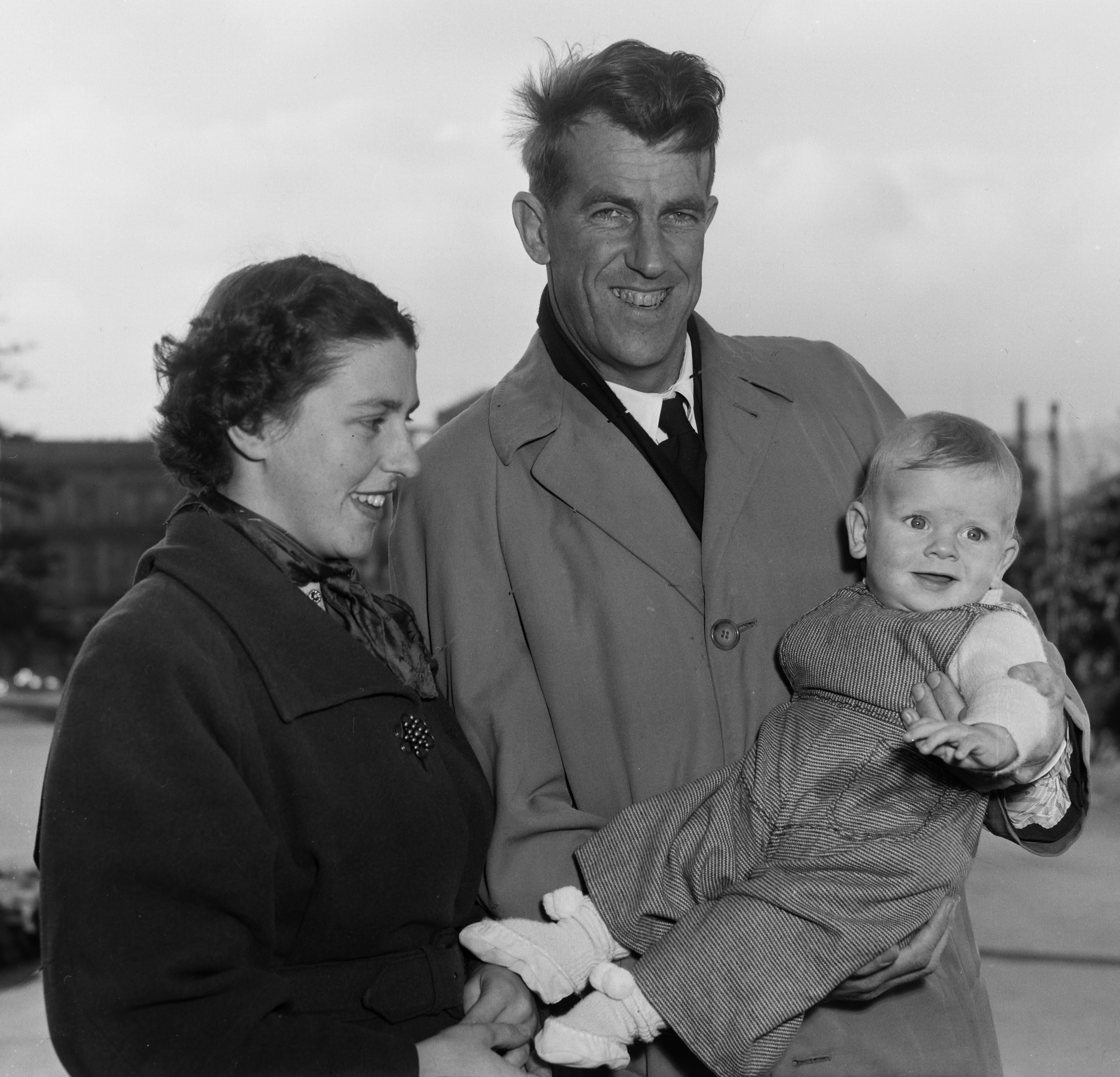
Hillary, with his first wife, Louise, and son, Peter, 1955

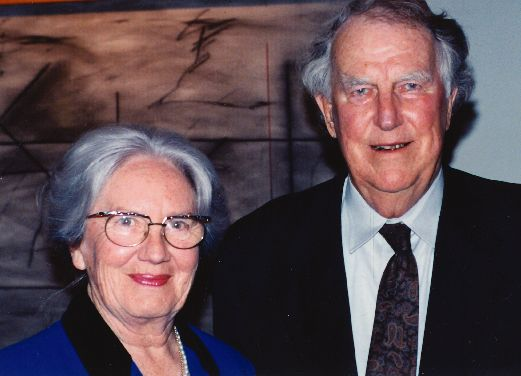
Hillary, with his second wife, June Mulgrew, 1998

Hillary married Louise Mary Rose (1930–1975) on 3 September 1953, soon after the ascent of Everest; he admitted he was terrified of proposing to her and relied on her mother to propose on his behalf. They had three children: Peter (born 1954), Sarah (born 1956) and Belinda (1959–1975). On 31 March 1975, while en route to join Hillary in the village of Phaphlu, where he was helping to build a hospital, Louise and Belinda were killed in a plane crash near Kathmandu airport shortly after take-off.

In 1989, he married June Mulgrew, the widow of his close friend Peter Mulgrew, who died on Air New Zealand Flight 901 in 1979. June, Lady Hillary, died in Auckland on 1 June 2024.

His son Peter Hillary also became a climber, summiting Everest in 1990. In May 2002, Peter climbed Everest as part of a 50th anniversary celebration; Jamling Tenzing Norgay (son of Tenzing, who had died in 1986) was also part of the expedition.

Hillary's home for most of his life was a property on Remuera Road in Auckland City, where he enjoyed reading adventure and science fiction novels in his retirement. He also built a bach at Whites Beach, one of Auckland's west coast beaches in West Auckland, between Anawhata and North Piha. A friend called it Hillary's place of solace, where he could escape media attention.

The Hillary family has had a connection with the west coast of Auckland since 1925, when Louise's father built a bach at Anawhata. The family donated land at Whites Beach that is now crossed by trampers on the Hillary Trail, named for Edmund. Hillary said of the area: "That is the thing that international travel brings home to me – it's always good to be going home. This is the only place I want to live in; this is the place I want to see out my days."

=== Philanthropy ===
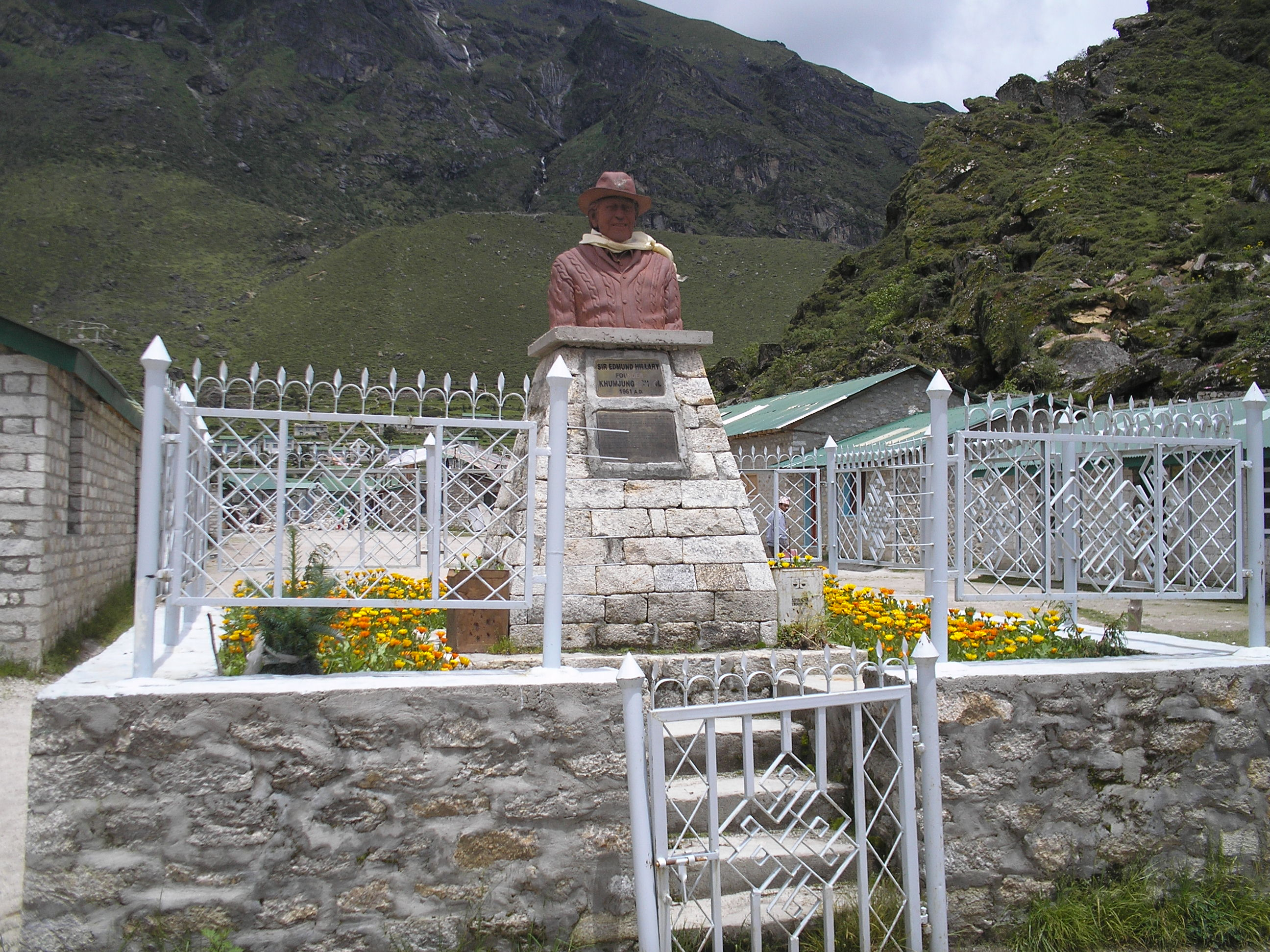
A bust of Sir Edmund at Khumjung School which he helped to found

Following his ascent of Everest, he devoted himself to assisting the Sherpa people of Nepal through the Himalayan Trust, which he established in 1960 and led until his death in 2008. His efforts are credited with the construction of many schools and hospitals in this remote region of the Himalayas. He was the Honorary President of the American Himalayan Foundation, a United States non-profit body that helps improve the ecology and living conditions in the Himalayas. He was also the Honorary President of Mountain Wilderness, an international NGO dedicated to the worldwide protection of mountains.

=== Political involvement ===
Hillary supported the Labour Party in the 1975 New Zealand general election, as a member of the "Citizens for Rowling" campaign. His involvement in this campaign was seen as precluding his nomination as governor-general; the position was offered to Keith Holyoake in 1977. In 1985, Hillary was appointed New Zealand High Commissioner to India (concurrently High Commissioner to Bangladesh and Ambassador to Nepal) and spent four and a half years based in New Delhi.

In 1975, Hillary served as a vice president for the Abortion Law Reform Association of New Zealand, a national pro-choice advocacy group. He was also a patron of REPEAL, an organisation seeking repeal of the restrictive Contraception, Sterilisation, and Abortion Act 1977.

== Death ==
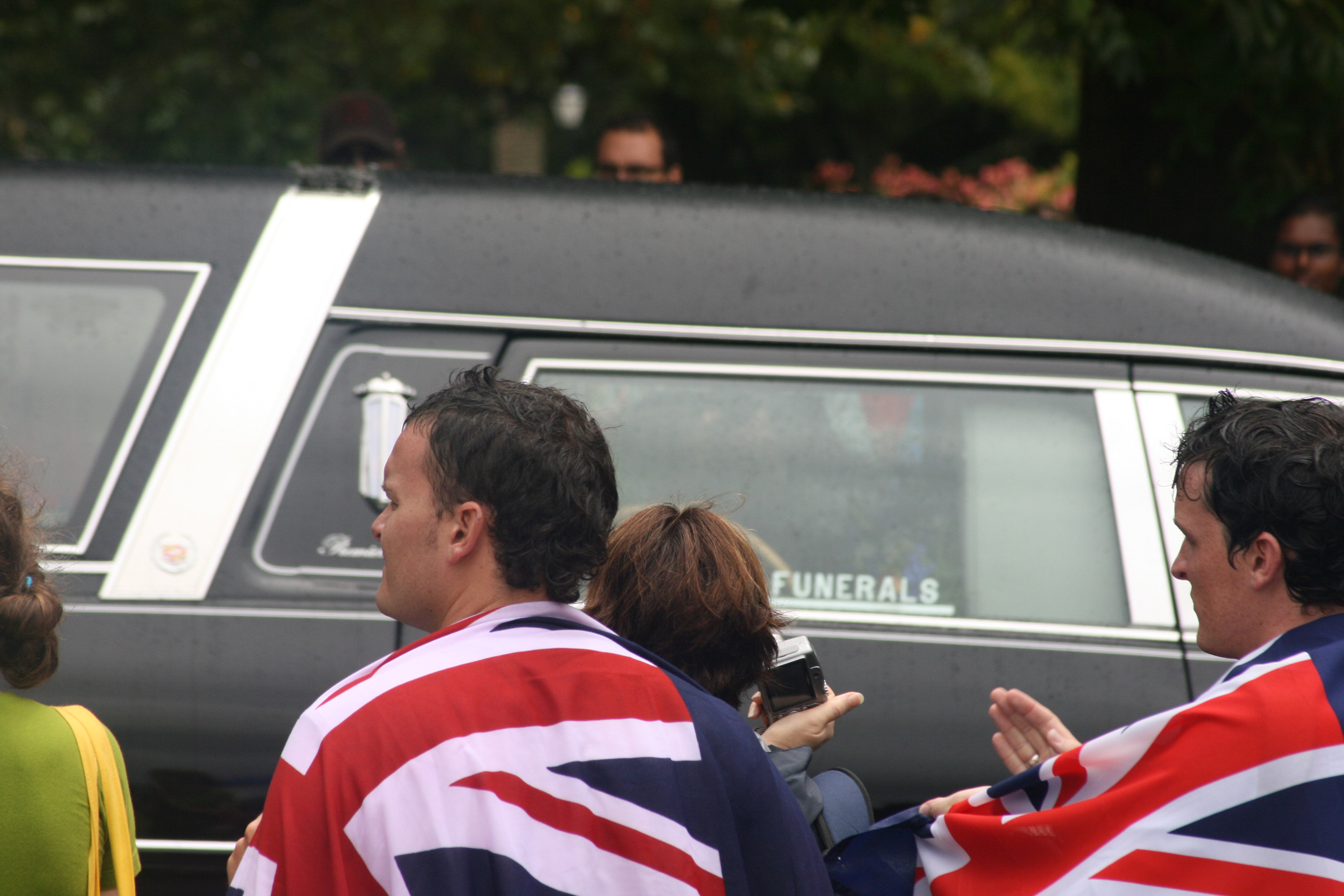
People draped in the Flag of New Zealand as Hillary's hearse passes

On 22 April 2007, while on a trip to Kathmandu, Hillary suffered a fall, and was hospitalised after returning to New Zealand.

On 11 January 2008, he died of heart failure at Auckland City Hospital, at the age of 88. Flags were lowered to half-mast on New Zealand public buildings and at Scott Base in Antarctica, and the Prime Minister, Helen Clark, called Hillary's death a "profound loss to New Zealand".

On 21 January, Hillary's casket was taken into Holy Trinity Cathedral, Auckland, to lie in state. The following day, 22 January 2008, Hillary's casket was moved to the adjacent St Mary's church for a state funeral, after which his body was cremated. On 29 February 2008, most of his ashes were scattered in Auckland's Hauraki Gulf per his desire. The remainder went to a Nepalese monastery near Everest; a plan to scatter them on the summit was cancelled in 2010.

=== Posthumous tributes ===
In January 2008, Lukla Airport, in Lukla, Nepal, was renamed to Tenzing–Hillary Airport in recognition of their promotion of its construction. On 2 April 2008, a service of thanksgiving in Hillary's honour at St George's Chapel at Windsor Castle was attended by Queen Elizabeth II, New Zealand dignitaries (including Prime Minister Helen Clark), and members of Hillary's and Norgay's families; Gurkha soldiers from Nepal stood guard outside the ceremony. In October 2008, it was announced that future rugby test matches between England and New Zealand would be played for the Hillary Shield. In 2009, the Duke of Edinburgh's Award in New Zealand – formerly the Young New Zealanders' Challenge – was renamed "The Duke of Edinburgh's Hillary Award". On 5 November 2008, a commemorative set of five stamps was issued by New Zealand Post.

There have been many calls for lasting tributes to Hillary. The first major public tribute has been by way of the "Summits for Ed" tribute tour organised by the Sir Edmund Hillary Foundation. This tribute tour went from Bluff at the bottom of the South Island to Cape Reinga at the tip of the North Island, visiting 39 towns and cities along the way. In each venue, school children and members of the public were invited to join in climbing a significant hill or site in their area to show their respect for Hillary. The public were also invited to bring small rocks or pebbles that had special significance to them, which would be included in a memorial to Hillary at the base of Mt Ruapehu in the grounds of the Sir Edmund Hillary Outdoor Pursuits Centre. Funds donated during the tour are used by the foundation to sponsor young New Zealanders on outdoor courses. Over 8,000 persons attended these "Summit" climbs between March and May 2008.

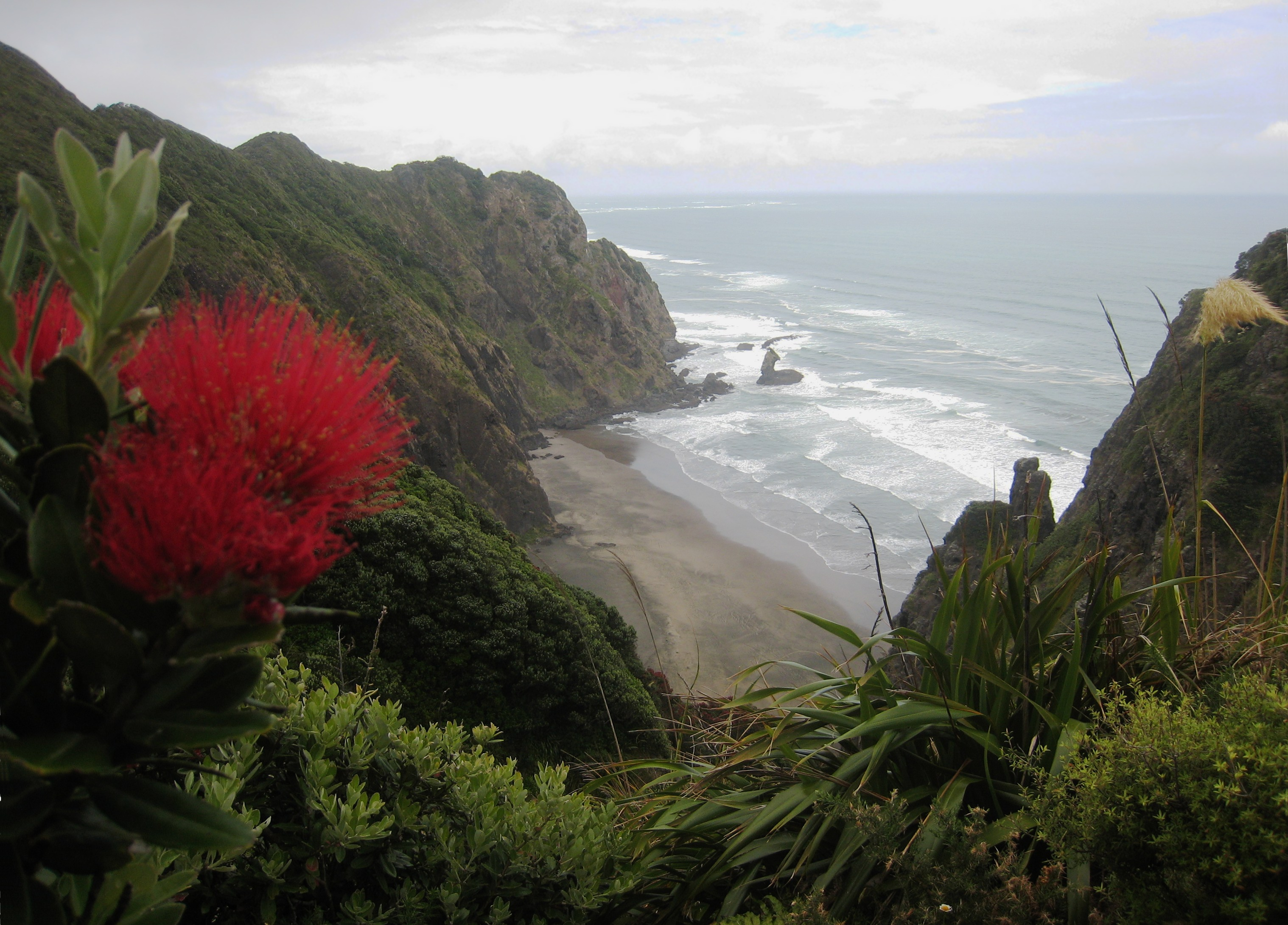
View from the Hillary Trail

The tribute song "Hillary 88", by the New Zealand duo The Kiwis, is the official world memorial song for Hillary, with the endorsement of Lady Hillary.

A four-day track in the Waitākere Ranges, along Auckland's west coast, is named the Hillary Trail, in honour of Hillary. Hillary's father-in-law, Jim Rose, who had built a bach at Anawhata in 1925, wrote in his 1982 history of Anawhata Beach, "My family look forward to the time when we will be able to walk from Huia to Muriwai on public walking tracks like the old-time Maori could do". Hillary loved the area, and had his own bach near Anawhata. The track was opened on 11 January 2010, the second anniversary of Hillary's death. Rose Track, descending from Anawhata Road to Whites Beach, is named after the Rose family.

The South Ridge of Aoraki / Mount Cook, New Zealand's highest mountain, was renamed Hillary Ridge on 18 August 2011. Hillary and three other climbers were the first party to successfully climb the ridge in 1948. In September 2013, the Government of Nepal proposed naming a 7,681-metre (25,200 ft) mountain in Nepal Hillary Peak in his honour. After the New Horizons mission discovered a mountain range on Pluto on 14 July 2015, it was officially named Hillary Montes (Hillary Mountains) by International Astronomical Union. The Sir Edmund Hillary Mountain Legacy Medal, awarded by the Nepalese NGO Mountain Legacy "for remarkable service in the conservation of culture and nature in mountainous regions" was inaugurated in 2003, with the approval of Sir Edmund Hillary. A bronze bust of Hillary (circa 1953) by Ophelia Gordon Bell is in the Te Papa museum in Wellington, New Zealand. The Sir Edmund Hillary Archive was added to the UNESCO Memory of the world archive in 2013; it is currently held by Auckland War Memorial Museum.

From 2016 to 2020, a pilot immigration programme to New Zealand awarded Edmund Hillary Fellowships, the benefits of which included a three-year Global Impact Visa to create, support, and incubate ventures and models that result in positive global impact, from New Zealand. After three years, migrants could qualify for permanent residency. The Edmund Hillary Foundation, which operated the pilot, claims that more than 250 of the allocated 400 visas were awarded before the pilot closed.

== Arms ==
Coat of arms of Sir Edmund Percival Hillary, KG, ONZ, KBE
| Crest A kiwi Azure grasping in the dexter foot an ice axe bendwise Or. Escutcheon Azure, a chevron embowed between two chevronels embowed in fess Argent between three prayer wheels bendwise Or. Supporters On either side an emperor penguin Proper gorged with a plain collar Or. Motto Nothing venture, nothing win Orders Order of the Garter, Order of New Zealand, and Order of the British Empire |

== Publications ==
Books written by Edmund Hillary
| Title | Year | Publisher | ISBN/ASIN | Co-author | Ref. |
|---|---|---|---|---|---|
| High Adventure (Note: Also High Adventure: The True Story of the First Ascent of Everest) | 1955 | Hodder & Stoughton (Note: (reprinted Oxford University Press) (paperback)) | ISBN 1-932302-02-6 (Note: and ISBN 0-19-516734-1) | n/a | |
| East of Everest – An Account of the New Zealand Alpine Club Himalayan Expedition to the Barun Valley in 1954 | 1956 | E. P. Dutton | ASIN B000EW84UM | George Lowe | |
| No Latitude for Error | 1961 | Hodder & Stoughton. | ASIN B000H6UVP6 | n/a | |
| The New Zealand Antarctic Expedition | 1959 | R.W. Stiles, printers. | ASIN B0007K6D72 | n/a | |
| The Crossing of Antarctica: The Commonwealth Transantarctic Expedition, 1955–1958 | 1958 | Cassell | ASIN B000HJGZ08 | Vivian Fuchs | |
| High in the Thin Cold Air (Note: the story of the Himalayan Expedition, led by Sir Edmund Hillary, sponsored by World Book Encyclopedia) | 1962 | Doubleday | ASIN B00005W121 | Desmond Doig | |
| Schoolhouse in the Clouds | 1965 | Hodder & Stoughton | ASIN B00005WRBB | n/a | |
| Nothing Venture, Nothing Win | 1975 | Hodder & Stoughton | ISBN 0-340-21296-9 | n/a | |
| From the Ocean to the Sky: Jet Boating Up the Ganges | 1979 | Viking | ISBN 0-7089-0587-0 | n/a | |
| Two Generations (Note: reissued as Ascent: Two Lives Explored: The Autobiographies of Sir Edmund and Peter Hillary) | 1984 | Hodder & Stoughton | ISBN 0-340-35420-8 | Peter Hillary | (Note: (1992) Paragon House Publishers ISBN 1-55778-408-6.) |
| View from the Summit: The Remarkable Memoir by the First Person to Conquer Everest | 2000 | Pocket | ISBN 0-7434-0067-4 | n/a | |
