= Tensing =

Tensing may refer to:

- Tenseness (or tensing), a concept in the linguistic fields of phonetics and phonology
- Ten Sing, a Christian youth program

== See also ==
- Tenzing (name), a Nepalese name
- Tenzing (disambiguation)
