= Norgay =

Norgay is a Sherpa name may refer to:

- Tenzing Norgay (1915–1986) (for whom it was a given name, often mistaken for a surname), mountaineer, the first to ascend Mount Everest along with Edmund Hillary
- Tenzing Montes (formerly 'Norgay Montes'), a mountain chain on Pluto named in honour of Tenzing Norgay
- Jamling Tenzing Norgay (born 1965) (who intentionally uses it as a surname), Indian mountaineer

== See also ==
- Tenzing (name)
- Tenzing (disambiguation)
- Norge (disambiguation)
