= Tenzing (name) =

Tenzing is a Tibetan given name, a variant spelling of Tenzin. Notable people with the name include:

- Tenzing Norgay (1914–1986), Sherpa mountaineer in the first Everest ascent, whose relatives include:
  - Jamling Tenzing Norgay (born 1965), mountaineer (son of Tenzing Norgay)
  - Tashi Tenzing (born 1965), mountaineer (maternal grandson of Tenzing Norgay)
  - Tenzing Norgay Trainor, an actor from Liv and Maddie and voice actor from Abominable and Abominable and the Invisible City

== Fictional characters ==
- Tenzing Tharkay (Temeraire series), a character in the novel series Temeraire by Naomi Novik

== See also ==
- Ten Sing, a method of youth work
- Tenzing (disambiguation)
- Norgay (disambiguation)
