= Tenzing (disambiguation) =

Tenzing Norgay was a Sherpa mountaineer in the first Everest ascent.

Tenzing may also refer to:

- Tenzing (name), a list of people with the Tibetan name
- Tenzing Montes (formerly Norgay Montes), a mountain chain on Pluto named in honour of Tenzing Norgay
- Tenzing (film), a 2026 film

== See also ==
- Ten Sing, a method of youth work
