= Norwegian =

Norwegian, Norwayan, or Norsk may refer to:

- Something of, from, or related to Norway, a country in northwestern Europe
- Norwegians, both a nation and an ethnic group native to Norway
- Demographics of Norway
- Norwegian language, including the two official written forms:
  - Bokmål, literally "book language", used by 85–90% of the population of Norway
  - Nynorsk, literally "New Norwegian", used by 10–15% of the population of Norway
- Norwegian Sea

Norwegian or Norsk may also refer to:

== Norwegian ==
- Norwegian Air Shuttle, an airline, trading as Norwegian
  - Norwegian Long Haul, a defunct subsidiary of Norwegian Air Shuttle, flying long-haul flights
- Norwegian Air Lines, a former airline, merged with Scandinavian Airlines in 1951
- Norwegian coupling, used for narrow-gauge railways
- Norwegian Cruise Line, a cruise line
- Norwegian Elkhound, a canine breed
- Norwegian Forest cat, a domestic feline breed
- Norwegian Red, a breed of dairy cattle
- Norwegian Township, Pennsylvania, USA

== Norsk ==
- Norsk (marque), a Norwegian brand of cars
- Norsk (rural locality), a rural locality in Russia
- Norsk TV1, a defunct Norwegian television channel

== See also ==
- Norway (disambiguation)
- Norge (disambiguation)
- Norse (disambiguation)
