= Lobsang Tshering =

Indian Sherpa mountaineer

Lopsang Tshering Bhutia (1951/1952–10 May 1993) was an Indian Sherpa mountaineer who died on Mount Everest and the nephew of Tenzing Norgay. His death made international headlines because he died on the 40th anniversary expedition of his uncle's summiting. His uncle, Tenzing Norgay, had died at home of natural causes in 1986 at the age of 72. Tenzing Norgay was the first person to summit Mount Everest in 1953 along with Sir Edmund Hillary.

Lopsang was an instructor at the Himalayan Mountaineering Institute and took part in the 1993 Everest expedition led by his nephew, Tashi Tenzing (Tenzing Norgay's grandson), to commemorate the 40th anniversary of his uncle's 1953 ascent of Mount Everest. Lopsang reached the summit but was killed in a fall during the descent on 10 May 1993.

A 2008 study noted that most deaths occur on Mount Everest during summit descents; due to the fact that climbers are fatigued and likely suffering from hypoxia. Falling is one of the greatest dangers on Mount Everest and other mountains that are taller than 8000 meters.

== See also ==
- Indian summiters of Mount Everest - Year wise
- List of Mount Everest records of India
- List of Mount Everest records
- List of Mount Everest summiters by number of times to the summit
- List of people who died climbing Mount Everest
