= Norway (disambiguation) =

Norway is a country in Northern Europe. The word may also refer to:

== Places ==
=== Canada ===
- Norway, Toronto, a former village now part of the Upper Beaches neighbourhood
- Norway House, Manitoba
- Norway, Prince Edward Island
- New Norway, Alberta

=== United States ===
- Norway, Illinois
- Norway, Indiana
- Norway, Iowa
- Norway, Kansas
- Norway, Maine, a New England town
  - Norway (CDP), Maine, the main village in the town
- Norway, Michigan
- Norway, Nebraska
- Norway, New York
- Norway, Oregon
- Norway, South Carolina
- Norway, Wisconsin

== Other uses ==
- Kingdom of Norway (872–1397), the old Norwegian kingdom from the early to high Middle Ages
- Kingdom of Norway (1814), short-lived state
- Nevil Shute Norway (1899–1960), a British aeronautical engineer and novelist who published under the pen name "Nevil Shute"
- The SS France (1961), which sailed for much of its operational life as SS Norway
- "Norway" (song), by Beach House, from the album Teen Dream
- Sons of Norway, a North American fraternal organization
- Norway pine, Pinus resinosa, a pine native to North America
- Norway spruce, Picea abies, a spruce native to Europe
- Norway Pavilion at Epcot, one of the 11 countries at EPCOT
- Norway (2014 film), a Greek black comedy horror film
- Norway (2018 film), also known as 22 July, a 2018 American film based on the 2011 Norway attacks
- Norway Corporation, the motion picture and television production company established by Gene Roddenberry

== See also ==
- Norge (disambiguation), the Norwegian name for Norway
- Norwegian (disambiguation)
