= Tenzin =

Tenzin བསྟན་འཛིན
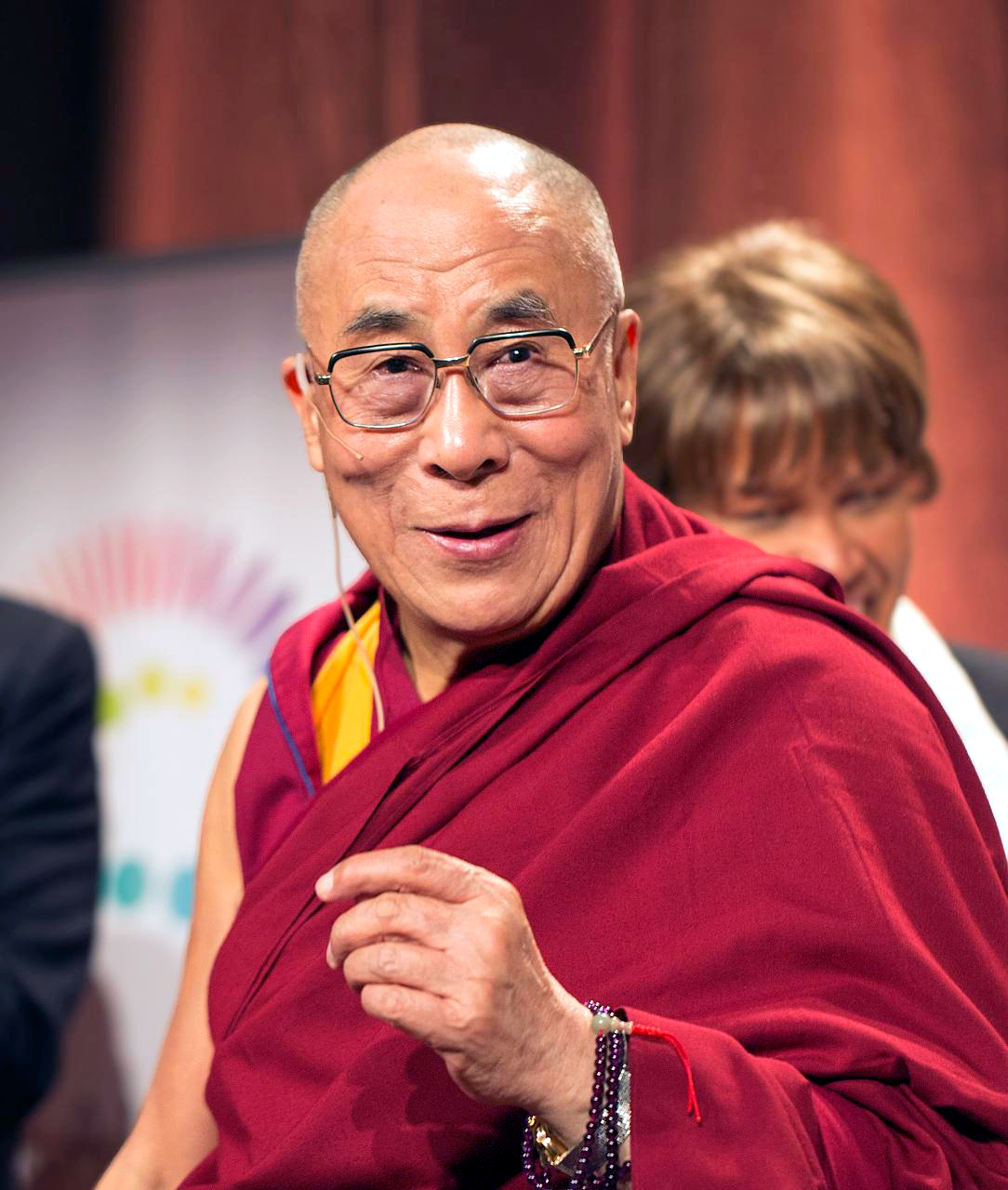
- Tenzin Gyatso, the 14th Dalai Lama
- Pronunciation: Tibetan: [tɛ̃́.t͡sĩ́] (Lhasa)
- Gender: Unisex
- Language: Tibetan

Origin
- Meaning: "The holder of Buddha Dharma"

Other names
- Alternative spelling: Tenzing

Tenzin (Standard Tibetan: བསྟན་འཛིན) is a Tibetan given name, meaning "the holder of Buddha Dharma". Tenzin can alternatively be spelled as Tenzing and Stanzin as well. Stanzin is generally used by the Ladakhi people, since Ladakhi language retains many archaic forms that have been lost in other modern Tibetan languages. For example, in Standard Written Tibetan, 'Tenzin' is spelled as "bstan'zin"; however, when it is spoken, both the 'b' and the 's' are silent and 'an' becomes 'en' in Standard Lhasa Tibetan.

== Biographical people ==
- Daw Tenzin (born 1956), Bhutanese civil servant
- Gyalsey Tenzin Rabgye (1638–1696), fourth Druk Desi (secular ruler) of Bhutan
- Khunu Lama Tenzin Gyaltsen (1895–1977), leader of a non-sectarian movement within Buddhism
- Lobsang Tenzin (born 1937), Prime Minister of the Tibetan government-in-exile
- Lopön Tenzin Namdak (1926–2025), Tibetan religious leader
- Tenzin Choedrak (1922–2001), personal physician to the Dalai Lama
- Tenzin Delek Rinpoche (1950–2015), Tibetan Buddhist leader accused of involvement in a bombing
- Tenzin Gyatso (born 1935), the 14th Dalai Lama
- Tenzin Jigme (1948–1997), abbot of an important Tibetan Buddhist monastery
- Tenzin Palmo (born 1943), Tibetan Buddhist nun, author, and yogini
- Tenzin Priyadarshi, Buddhist philosopher and teacher; Director, The Dalai Lama Center for Ethics and Transformative Values at MIT
- Tenzin Tsundue (born 1975), Tibetan poet and activist
- Tenzin Wangyal Rinpoche, Tibetan lama
- Tenzin Zopa (born 1975), Buddhist monk and teacher

== Fictional characters ==
- Tenzin (Uncharted), fictitious leader of a Tibetan village
- Tenzin (The Legend of Korra), a character in the animation series The Legend of Korra
- Tenzing Tharkay (Temeraire series), a character in the novel series Temeraire by Naomi Novik
- Yakushiji Tenzen, a character in the novel The Kouga Ninja Scrolls

== See also ==
- Tenzing (name)
