= Norge =

Norge is the Norwegian (Bokmål and Riksmål), Danish and Swedish name for Norway.

It may also refer to:

== People ==
- Kaare Norge (born 1963), Danish guitarist
- Norge Luis Vera (born 1971), Cuban baseball player

== Places ==
- 11871 Norge, asteroid

Toponyms:

- Norge, Oklahoma
- Norge, Virginia

== Vehicles ==
- SS Norge, Danish passenger ship
- Norge (airship)
- Norge motorcycle, produced by Moto Guzzi
- Norwegian watercraft:
  - HNoMS Norge, naval ship
  - HNoMY Norge, royal yacht

== Companies ==
- Norge (appliance manufacturer), part of BorgWarner
- Radio Norge, station in Norway
- TVNorge, Norwegian broadcaster

== See also ==
- Norgay (disambiguation)
- Norway (disambiguation)
- Norwegian (disambiguation)
