= Tenzing (energy drink) =

British energy drink brand

Tenzing Natural Energy
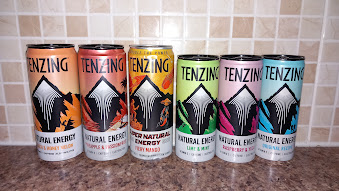
- Type: Private
- Founded: 2016
- Founder: Huib van Bockel
- Headquarters: London, United Kingdom
- Key people: Huib van Bockel (CEO)
- Number of employees: 15
- Website: https://tenzingnaturalenergy.com/

Tenzing is an energy drink company founded in the United Kingdom. It is named after Tenzing Norgay, in memory of his achievement of being one of the first people to summit Mount Everest.

== History ==
Former Red Bull marketing director, and Monster Energy executive Huib van Bockel created Tenzing Natural Energy in 2016. After trekking in Nepal, Bockel discovered 'energising' teas used by sherpas, and contacted Tenzing Norgay's family to form a partnership with them. His sons remain partners in the business. Tenzing Natural Energy drinks contain caffeine from green tea and green coffee, and are sweetened with beet and fruit sugar. In 2021, it became a certified B-Corp. The company claims to be the world's first carbon neutral energy drink.

In 2025, the multinational drinks company Heineken acquired a minority stake in the business.

As of 2025, Tenzing was the fourth largest functional energy drink sold in the UK, and had sold over 40 million cans.

In 2026, Tenzing launched a sub-range of the drinks, containing Lion's Mane, which is purported to support focus and mental clarity.

== Safety concerns ==
In 2024, Tenzing recalled 250ml cans of its Fiery Mango flavour after reports that some cans had exploded.
