= Tashi Tenzing =

Australian mountain climber

Tashi Wangchuk Tenzing
Personal information
- Citizenship: Australia
- Born: 30 November 1965 (age 60) Darjeeling, West Bengal, India
- Occupation(s): Mountaineer, Tour guide
- Spouse(s): Judy Pyne Tenzing (m. 1990, divorced) Bandi Nima Sherpa
- Children: 2
- Relative(s): Tenzing Norgay (maternal grandfather); Jamling Tenzing Norgay (uncle); Tenzing Norgay Trainor (cousin); Nawang Gombu (first cousin once removed)

Tashi Wangchuk Tenzing (Tibetan: བཀྲ་ཤིས་དབང་ཕྱུག་བསྟན་འཛིན་, Wylie: Bkra-shis Dbang-phyug Bstan-'dzin) is an Indian-born Australian Sherpa mountaineer. His maternal grandfather, Tenzing Norgay, made the first ascent of Mount Everest on 29 May 1953.

== Early life ==
Tashi was born to Pem Pem, who was the daughter of Tenzing Norgay. He spent part of his childhood in Darjeeling, India where he attended St Paul's School excelling at distance and sprint running, soccer, cricket, gymnastics, karate, hockey and horse-riding as well as oil painting and batik.

Tashi then went on to the University of Delhi to gain a Bachelor of Arts degree in Sociology. He established the Delhi University Climbing Club and studied at the Himalayan Mountaineering Institute in Darjeeling. His grandfather, Tenzing Norgay, established this Institute after his ascent of Everest to offer professional climbing instruction. Tashi graduated from the Institute as an instructor and still sometimes delivers courses there as a guest instructor.

== Career ==
Since leaving University Tashi has led trekking and climbing trips in Nepal, Tibet, Pakistan, Kashmir and the Indian Himalaya.

In 1993 Tashi led the 40th Anniversary Everest Expedition to mark the 40th anniversary of the first successful expedition of his grandfather, Tenzing Norgay. While his team was successful in getting two members to the summit on 10 May, Tashi's uncle and climbing partner, Lobsang Tshering, fell to his death on the descent from the summit. Tashi himself missed the summit as well by just 400 metres, having to turn back with snow blindness.

On 23 May 1997 Tashi reached the summit of Everest.

In 1998/99 he spent 9 months working for the Australian Antarctic Division at Mawson Station in the Antarctic and now guides treks there.

Tashi again reached the summit of Mount Everest for the second time in 2002.

On 16 May 2007, he reached the summit of Mount Everest from the Tibetan side.

Tashi is a contributor of SummitJournal.com, an international adventure and exploration project.

== Personal life ==
Tashi was married to Australian Judy Pyne Tenzing, and they have a son and daughter. He later returned to Nepal and married a Sherpa woman called Bandi Nima Sherpa and now lives in Kathmandu and runs a trekking company "Tenzing Asian Holidays".

In May 2013 Tashi Tenzing said he believed his grandfather Tenzing Norgay should have been knighted, not just given "a bloody medal". His cousin is actor Tenzing Norgay Trainor, best known as Parker in Liv and Maddie.

== Summits ==
He is usually credited as Tashi Wangchuk Tenzing of Australia, sometimes with a note that he is Tenzing's grandson

Everest

- 23 May 1997
- 16 May 2002
- 16 May 2007

Cho Oyu

- 9 May 2006

== See also ==
- List of Mount Everest summiters by number of times to the summit
