= Jamling Tenzing Norgay =

Indian mountaineer (born 1965)

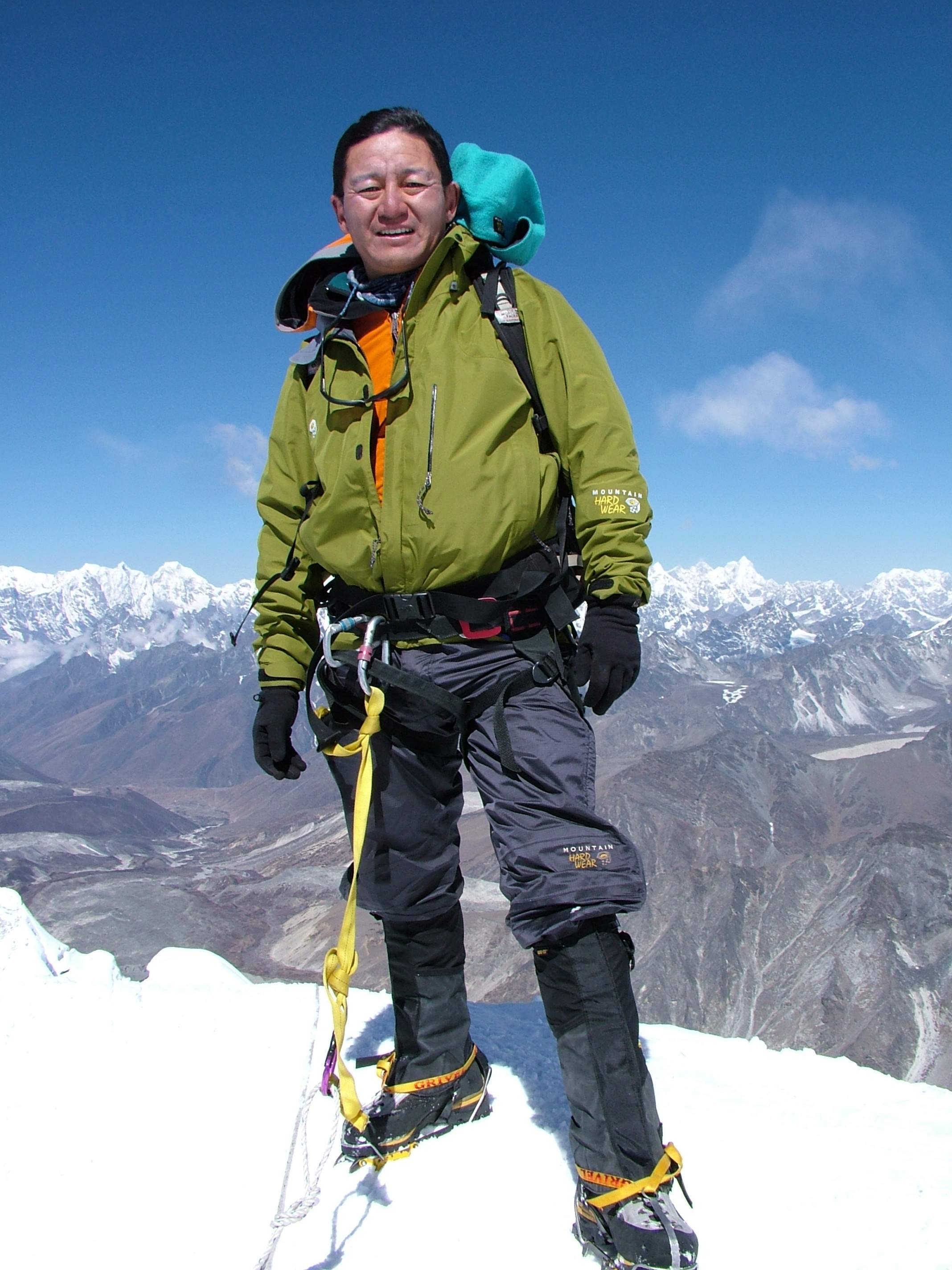
- Jamling Tenzing Norgay at the Island Peak summit
- Born: 23 April 1965 (age 61); Darjeeling, West Bengal, India
- Occupation: Mountaineer/motivational Speaker
- Spouse: Sonam Yangchen
- Children: 3
- Father: Tenzing Norgay
- Relatives: Tenzing Norgay Trainor (nephew); Tashi Tenzing (nephew); Nawang Gombu (cousin)

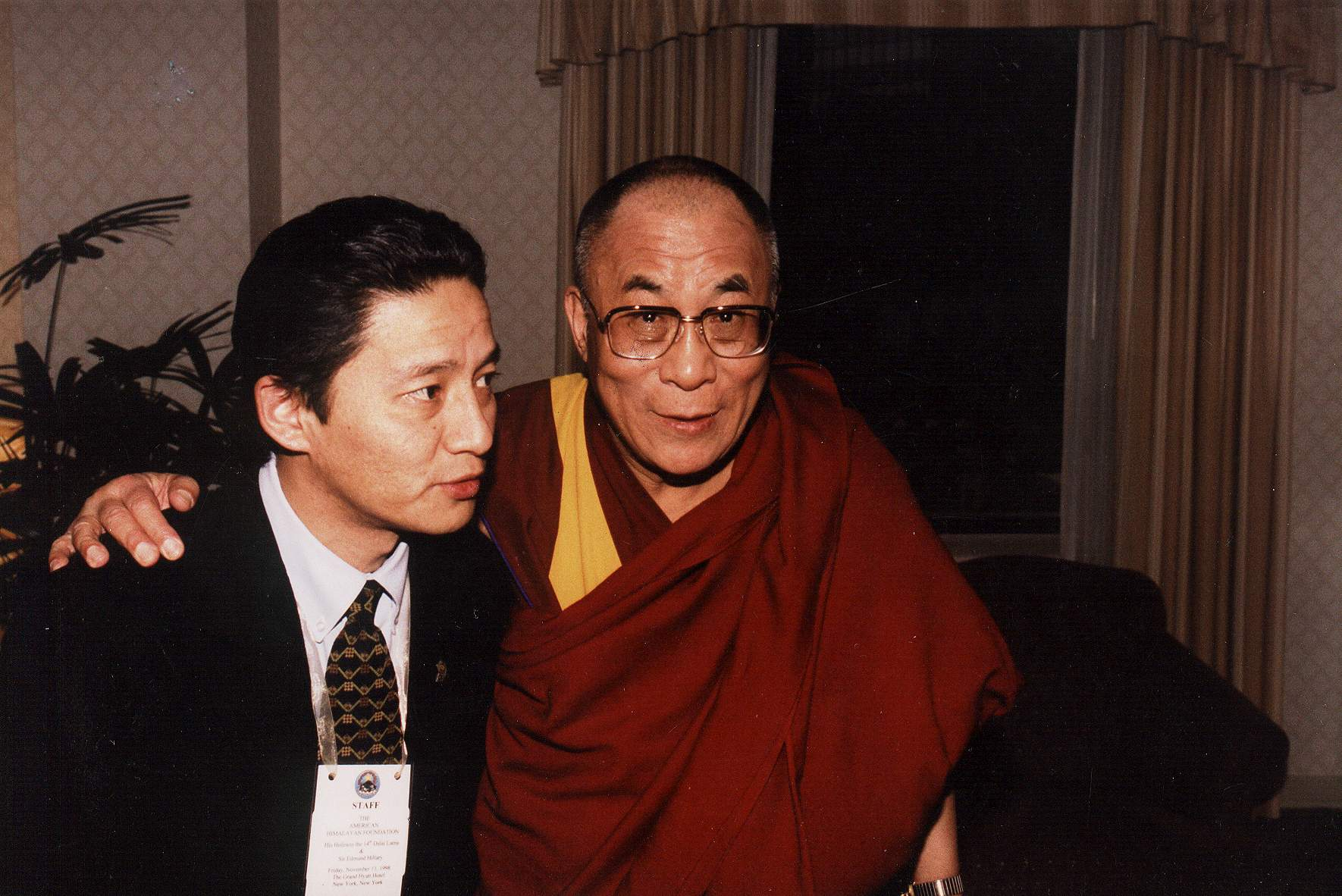
Jamling Tenzing Norgay with Dalai Lama

Jamling Tenzing Norgay (born 23 April 1965) is an Indian mountaineer and author, best known for summiting Mount Everest as part of the 1996 Everest IMAX expedition. He was born in Darjeeling, West Bengal, India, and is a son of Tenzing Norgay.

== Biography ==
Jamling is the son of mountaineer and guide Tenzing Norgay (who first climbed Mount Everest in 1953 with Sir Edmund Hillary) and Daku, his third wife. He was born in Darjeeling, West Bengal, India, and later attended St. Paul's School. After graduating, Jamling travelled to the United States to attend Northland College, in Wisconsin.

He later followed in his father's footsteps and climbed Mount Everest in 1996 with a team led by David Breashears that also included mountaineer Ed Viesturs and Araceli Segarra, an experience documented in the 1998 IMAX film Everest. In 2002, he and Peter Hillary, the son of Edmund Hillary, were part of an expedition to climb Everest and commemorate the 50th anniversary of the first ascent.

Norgay went on to write Touching My Father's Soul, a book documenting his experiences on the summit attempt. The book was notable for the frankness with which it discussed the relationship between the often wealthy climbers and the Sherpas who obtain their incomes from assisting expeditions. Norgay's book was the first to discuss from the Sherpas' point of view of the disastrous May 1996 climbing season, in which twelve climbers died. It noted that little notice is taken when Sherpas die, but much attention is given when those lost are clients.

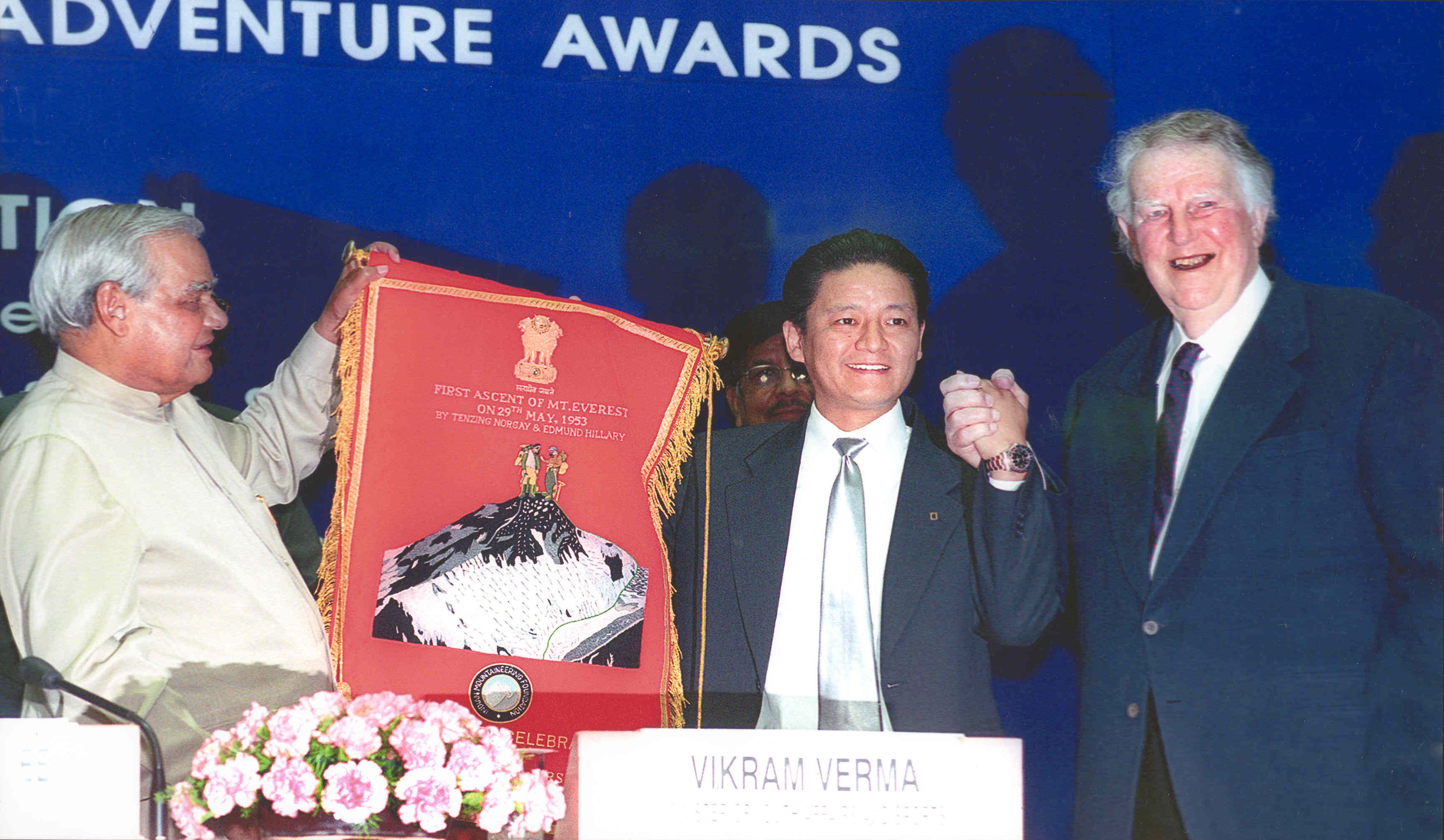
Jamling Tenzing Norgay and Sir Edmund Hillary receiving Everest 50 Years Award from Prime Minister of India Atal Bihari Vajpayee in 2003.

== Bibliography ==
- Norgay, Jamling Tenzing (2001), Touching my father's soul: a Sherpa's journey to the top of Everest (reprint ed.), HarperSanFrancisco, ISBN 978-0-06-251687-9
- Hartemann, Frederic V.; Hauptman, Robert; Norgay, Jamling Tenzing (2005), The mountain encyclopedia: an A-Z compendium of more than 2,300 terms, concepts, ideas, and people, Taylor Trade, ISBN 978-1-58979-161-9
