= Ten Sing =

Ten Sing is a Christian youth program within YWCA and YMCA, engaging teenagers in creative performing arts.

The program is run in several countries across Europe. There are a few small groups outside Europe.

The program, as part of YMCA Europe, is accredited with the European Union.

== Activities, goals and values ==
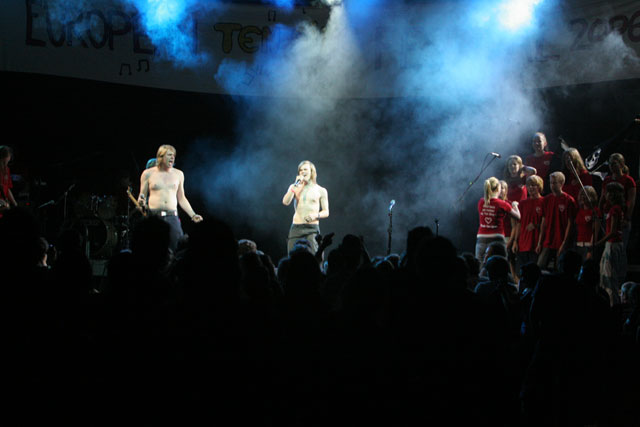

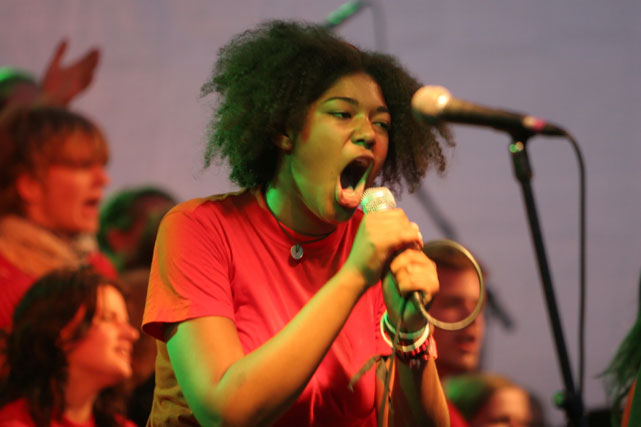

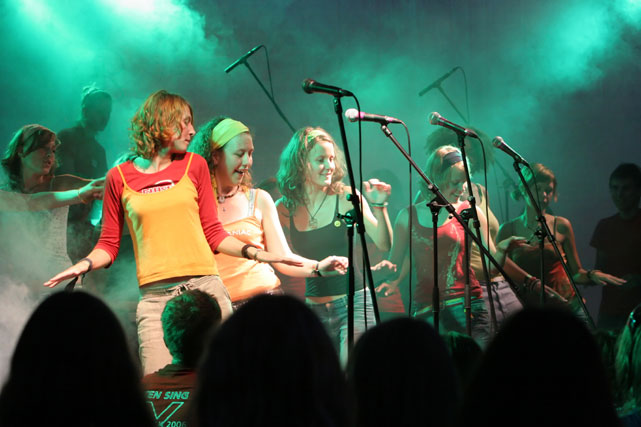

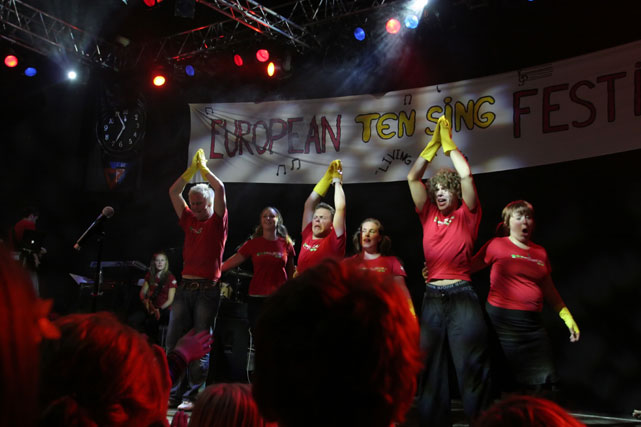

Ten Sing describes their mission as developing leadership skills, while encouraging the development of body, mind, and spirit, hence why their logo is a triangle.

Ten Sing foucses on five C's: "Culture, Creativity, Care, Competence, and Christ."

Young people run their own programs where are adults are available for support and advice when needed.

The goal of the program is to encourage young people to develop and execute a creative performance involving music, dance, drama, video and other forms of self expression. By working together in a safe environment young people can challenge each other, develop and grow.

Ten Sing is open to everyone irrespective of gender, beliefs, abilities, talents, ethnic, and social background. It is not necessary to be a Christian to be a member of Ten Sing. Due to the Christian focus and founding of Ten Sing, at least one of their key leaders is required to be a Christian.

== Origin ==
Ten Sing was first founded and originated in Norway in 1968. The name "Ten Sing" is a combination of the Norwegian suffix "-ten" (meaning "-teen") and the English word "sing" - a kind of language mixing that was quite common in Norway at the time.

The first Ten Sing group was started in Bergen by Kjell Grønner. It was inspired by Sing Out, which later became known as Up with People. In the years that followed, more groups were formed in Norway, and today there are over a hundred similar groups all over the country. The Norwegian YWCA-YMCA wanted to implement Ten Sing in other European countries, and the first of these international variants was Germany in 1986. This was the start of Ten Sing Norwegen, now known Ten Sing Norway. The name has no relation to Tenzing Norgay, part of the expedition that first successfully summitted Mount Everest.

The first European Ten Sing Conference was held in 1987.

== Key events in the European Ten Sing Group (ETS) ==
- 1993: Germany (Dobelmühle)
- 1995: Norway (Haugesund)
- 1997: Hungary (Kiskörös)
- 1999: Czech Republic (Litomysl)
- 2003: YMCA Festival Czech Republic (Prague)
- 2006: Denmark (Århus)
- 2008: YMCA Festival Czech Republic (Prague)
- 2011: Germany (Ziegenhain)
- 2013: YMCA Festival Czech Republic (Prague)
- 2018: Celebrating 50 years of Ten Sing, Norway
- Annual European Ten Sing Group Conference (location varies)

== Ten Sing Norway ==
Ten Sing Norway is a one-year leader training program within YMCA/YWCA of Norway. During the year the participants visit YMCA and YWCA - festivals, Ten Sing groups, youth clubs and groups within YMCA/YWCA in both Norway and Europe. When on tour, Ten Sing Norway is holding seminars, shows, concerts and Ten Sing rehearsals. The participants live at Rønningen Folk High School in Oslo, and study Bible studies and Christian Youth Work at the University of Oslo.

== Sources ==
- Høgne, Guro (1998): Ten Sings betydning for musikalsk og personlig utvikling: et casestudie av et Ten Sing-kor (en. The significance of Ten Sing for musical and personal development: A case study of a Ten Sing choir). Master Thesis, Oslo University.
- Ulstein, Jan Ove (red.): Ten Sing Norway International Inc.: perspektiv på ti års prosjektliv. (en. Ten Sing Norway International inc.: perspective on ten years project life). Report. Volda University College.
- Ten Sing Norway Homepage
- Description of the Ten Sing Norway Curriculum
