= Tenzing Norgay =

Nepalese-Indian mountaineer (1914–1986)

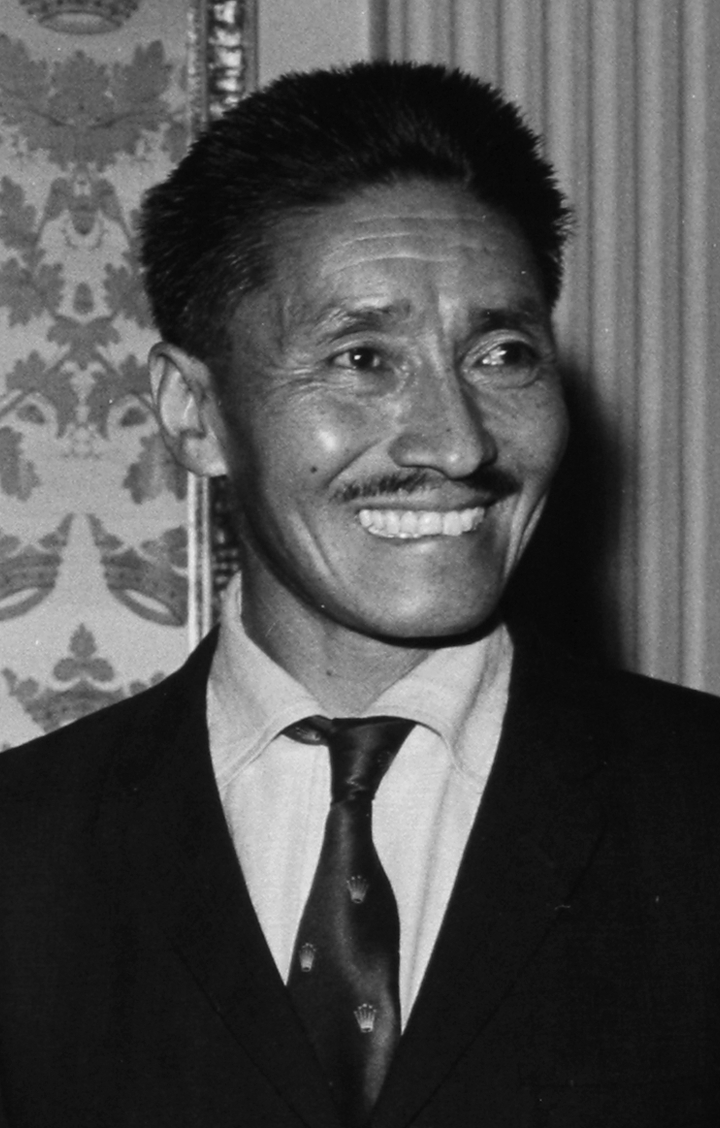
- Norgay in 1967

Personal information
- Citizenship: Nepal; India
- Born: Namgyal Wangdi; May 1914 Tengboche, Sagarmatha Zone, Nepal, or Tse Chu, Ü-Tsang, Tibet
- Died: 9 May 1986 (aged 71–72) Darjeeling, West Bengal, India
- Spouses: Dawa Phuti (m. 1935; died 1944); Ang Lahmu (m. 1945; died 1964); Dakku (m. before or in 1964)
- Children: 7, including Jamling
- Relatives: Tashi Tenzing (grandson); Tenzing Norgay Trainor (grandson); Nawang Gombu (nephew)

Climbing career
- Type of climber: Mountaineer
- Major ascents: First ascent of Mount Everest, May 1953

Tenzing Norgay (/ˈtɛnzɪŋ ˈnɔːrɡeɪ/; Sherpa: བསྟན་འཛིན་ནོར་རྒྱས tendzin norgyé; May 1914 – 9 May 1986), born Namgyal Wangdi, and also referred to as Sherpa Tenzing, was a Nepalese-Indian Sherpa mountaineer. On 29 May 1953, he and Edmund Hillary were the first people confirmed to have reached the summit of Mount Everest, as part of the 1953 British Mount Everest expedition. Time named Norgay one of the 100 most influential people of the 20th century.

== Early life ==
There are conflicting accounts of Tenzing's early life. In his autobiography, he wrote that he was a Sherpa born and raised in Tengboche, Khumbu, in northeastern Nepal. In a 1985 interview with All India Radio, he said his parents came from Tibet, but that he was born in Nepal. According to many later accounts, including a book co-written by his son Jamling Tenzin Norgay, he was born in Tibet, at Tse Chu in the Kama Valley, and grew up in Thame, Nepal. He spent his early childhood in Kharta, near the north of the country. Norgay went to Nepal as a child to work for a Sherpa family in Khumbu.

Khumbu lies near Mount Everest, which the Tibetans and Sherpas call Chomolungma; in Standard Tibetan, that name means "Holy Mother", or the goddess of the summit. Buddhism is the traditional religion of the Sherpas and Tibetans, and Norgay was Buddhist.

Although his exact date of birth is unknown, he knew it was in late May by the weather and the crops. After his ascent of Everest on 29 May 1953, he decided to celebrate his birthday on that day thereafter. His year of birth, according to the Tibetan calendar, was the Year of the Rabbit, making it likely that he was born in 1914. This agrees with Hunt's statement that he was 39 in 1953, and had "established himself (as) not only the foremost climber of his race but as a mountaineer of world standing".

Tenzing was originally called "Namgyal Wangdi", but as a child his name was changed on the advice of the head lama and founder of Rongbuk Monastery, Ngawang Tenzin Norbu. "Tenzing Norgay" translates as "wealthy-fortunate-follower-of-religion". His father, a Tibetan yak herder, was Ghang La Mingma (d. 1949), and his mother, who was Tibetan, was Dokmo Kinzom. She lived to see him climb Everest. Tenzing was the 11th of 13 children, several of whom died young.

Tenzing ran away from home twice in his teens, first to Kathmandu and later to Darjeeling, India (which at that time was the starting point for most expeditions in the eastern Himalayas), and eventually acquired Indian citizenship. He was once sent to Tengboche Monastery to become a monk, but he decided that was not for him and left. At the age of 19 he settled in the Sherpa community in the Too Song Busti district of Darjeeling.

== Mountaineering ==
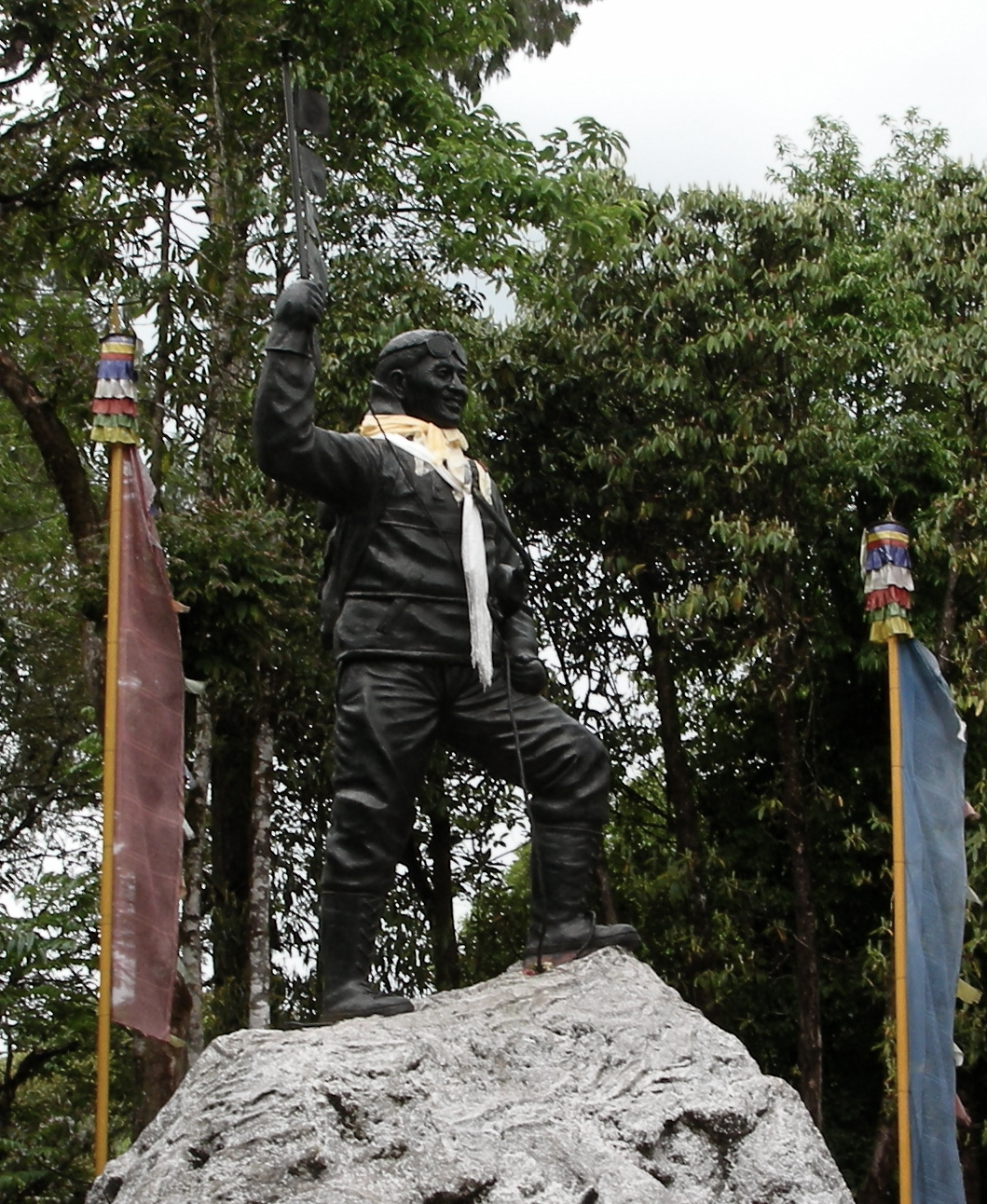
Statue of Norgay at the Himalayan Mountaineering Institute

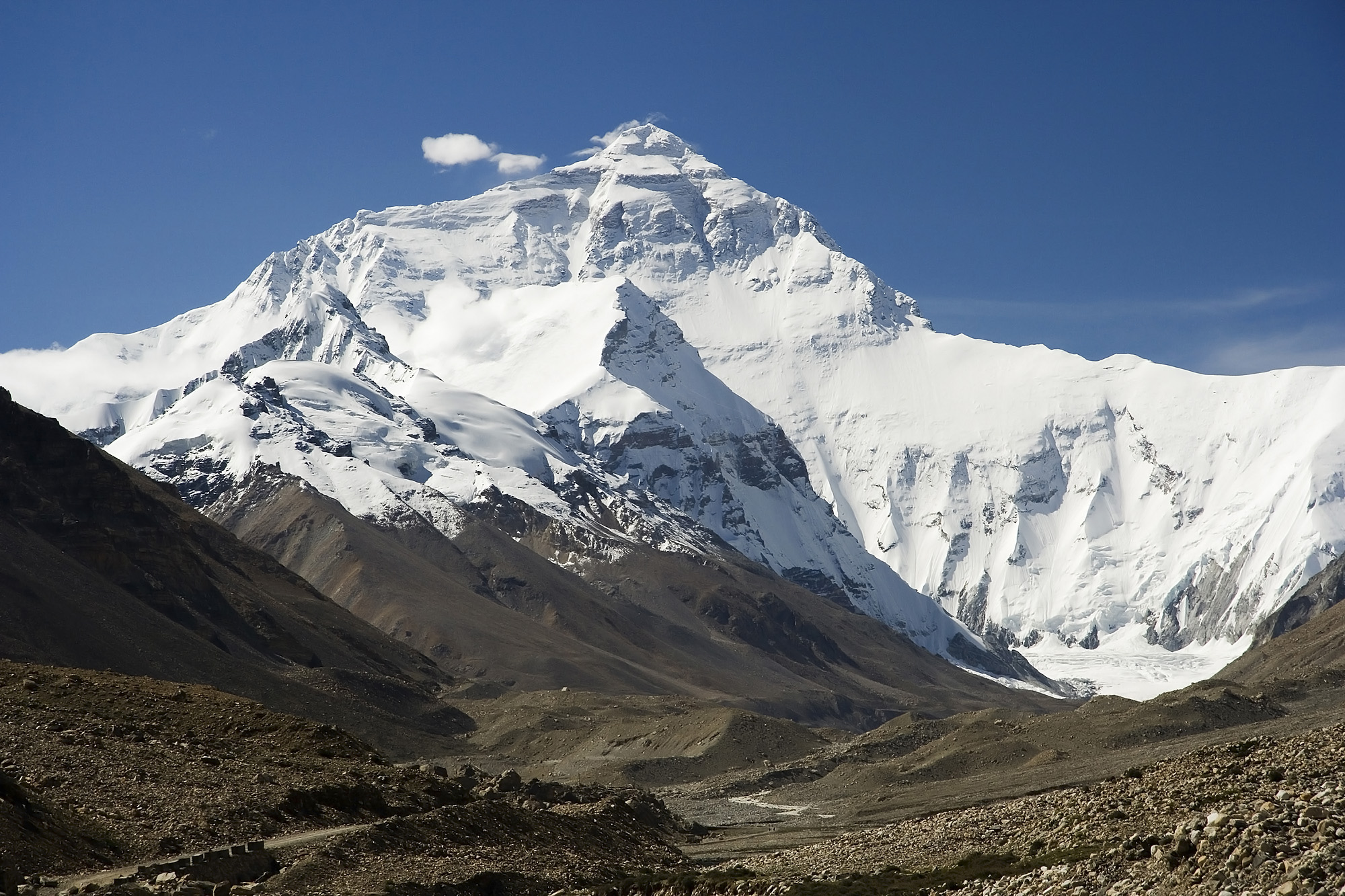
Mount Everest

Norgay received his first opportunity to join an Everest expedition at age 20, when Eric Shipton was assembling the 1935 British Mount Everest reconnaissance expedition. After two other prospective team members failed their medical tests, Norgay was pushed forward by his friend Ang Tharkay, a Sherpa sirdar who had been on the 1933 British Mount Everest expedition. His attractive smile caught the eye of Shipton, who decided to take him on.

Norgay participated as a high-altitude porter in three official British attempts to climb Everest from the northern Tibetan side in the 1930s. On the 1936 expedition, he worked with John Morris. He also took part in other climbs in various parts of the Indian subcontinent. For a time in the early 1940s, Norgay lived in the princely state of Chitral (then in India, later a part of Pakistan) as batman to a Major Chapman. Norgay's first wife died and was buried there during his sojourn in the state. He returned to Darjeeling with his two daughters during the Indian partition of 1947, and managed to cross India by train without a ticket and without being challenged by wearing one of Major Chapman's old uniforms.

In 1947, Norgay participated in an unsuccessful summit attempt of Everest. The Canadian-born mountaineer Earl Denman, Ange Dawa Sherpa, and Norgay entered Tibet illegally to attempt the climb, an attempt which ended when a strong storm hit at 22,000 feet (6,700 m). Denman admitted defeat, and all three turned around, returning safely. In 1947, Norgay became a sirdar of a Swiss expedition for the first time after having helped to rescue Sirdar Wangdi Norbu, who had fallen and been seriously injured. The expedition reached the main summit of Kedarnath at 22,769 feet (6,940 m) in the western Garhwal Himalaya with Norgay among the summit party. In 1951 he joined the 1951 British Mount Everest reconnaissance expedition.

== 1952 Swiss Mount Everest expedition ==
In 1952, he took part in the two Swiss expeditions led by Edouard Wyss-Dunant (spring) and Gabriel Chevalley (autumn), the first serious attempts to climb Everest from the southern (Nepalese) side, after two previous US and British reconnaissance expeditions in 1950 and 1951. On 28 May, Raymond Lambert and Tenzing Norgay were able to reach a height of about 8,595 metres (28,199 ft) on the southeast ridge, setting a new climbing altitude record. The expedition, during which Norgay was for the first time considered a full expedition member ("the greatest honour that had ever been paid me"), opened up a new route on Everest that was successfully climbed the next year and forged a lasting friendship between Norgay and his Swiss friends, in particular Raymond Lambert. During the autumn expedition, the team was stopped by bad weather after reaching an altitude of 8,100 metres (26,575 ft).

== Success on Mount Everest ==
In 1953, Tenzing Norgay took part in John Hunt's expedition; Tenzing had previously been to Everest six times (and Hunt three). A member of the team was Edmund Hillary, who fell into a crevasse but was saved from hitting the bottom by Norgay's prompt action in securing the rope using his ice axe, which led Hillary to consider him the climbing partner of choice for any future summit attempt.

At the time, newspaper reports variously referred to him as Tensing, Tenzing, Tenzing Bhotia, Tenzing Norgay, Tensing Norkey, Tenzing Sherpa or Dan Shin, as one Indian academic suggested.

The Hunt expedition totalled over 400 people, including 362 porters, 20 Sherpa guides and 10,000 pounds (4,500 kg) of baggage, and like many such expeditions, was a team effort.

The expedition set up base camp in March 1953. Hillary wrote in 1975 about first meeting Norgay in Kathmandu on 5 March 1953:

I was eager to meet Tenzing Norgay. His reputation had been most impressive even before his two great efforts with the Swiss expedition ... Tenzing really looked the part – larger than most Sherpas, he was very strong and active; his flashing smile was irresistible; and he was incredibly patient with all our questions and requests. His success in the past had given him great physical confidence – I think that even then he expected to be a member of the final assault party ... One message came through however in very positive fashion – Tenzing had substantially greater personal ambition than any Sherpa I had met.

Working slowly, the expedition set up their penultimate camp at the South Col, at 25,900 feet (7,900 m). On 26 May, Tom Bourdillon and Charles Evans attempted the climb, but turned back when Evans' oxygen system failed. The pair had reached the South Summit, coming within 300 vertical feet (91 m) of the summit. Hunt then directed Norgay and Hillary to go for the summit.

Snow and wind held the pair up at the South Col for two days. They set out on 28 May with a support trio comprising Ang Nyima, Alfred Gregory and George Lowe. Norgay and Hillary pitched a tent at 27,900 feet (8,500 m) on 28 May while their support group returned down the mountain. On the following morning, Hillary discovered that his boots had frozen solid outside the tent. He spent two hours warming them before he and Tenzing attempted the final ascent, wearing 30-pound (14 kg) packs. The last part of the ascent comprised a 40-foot (12 m) rock face later named the "Hillary Step". Hillary saw a means to wedge his way up a crack in the face between the rock wall and the ice, and Norgay followed.

From there, the following effort was relatively simple. They reached Everest's 29,028-foot (8,848 m) summit, the highest point on Earth, at 11:30 a.m. As Hillary put it, "A few more whacks of the ice axe in the firm snow, and we stood on top."

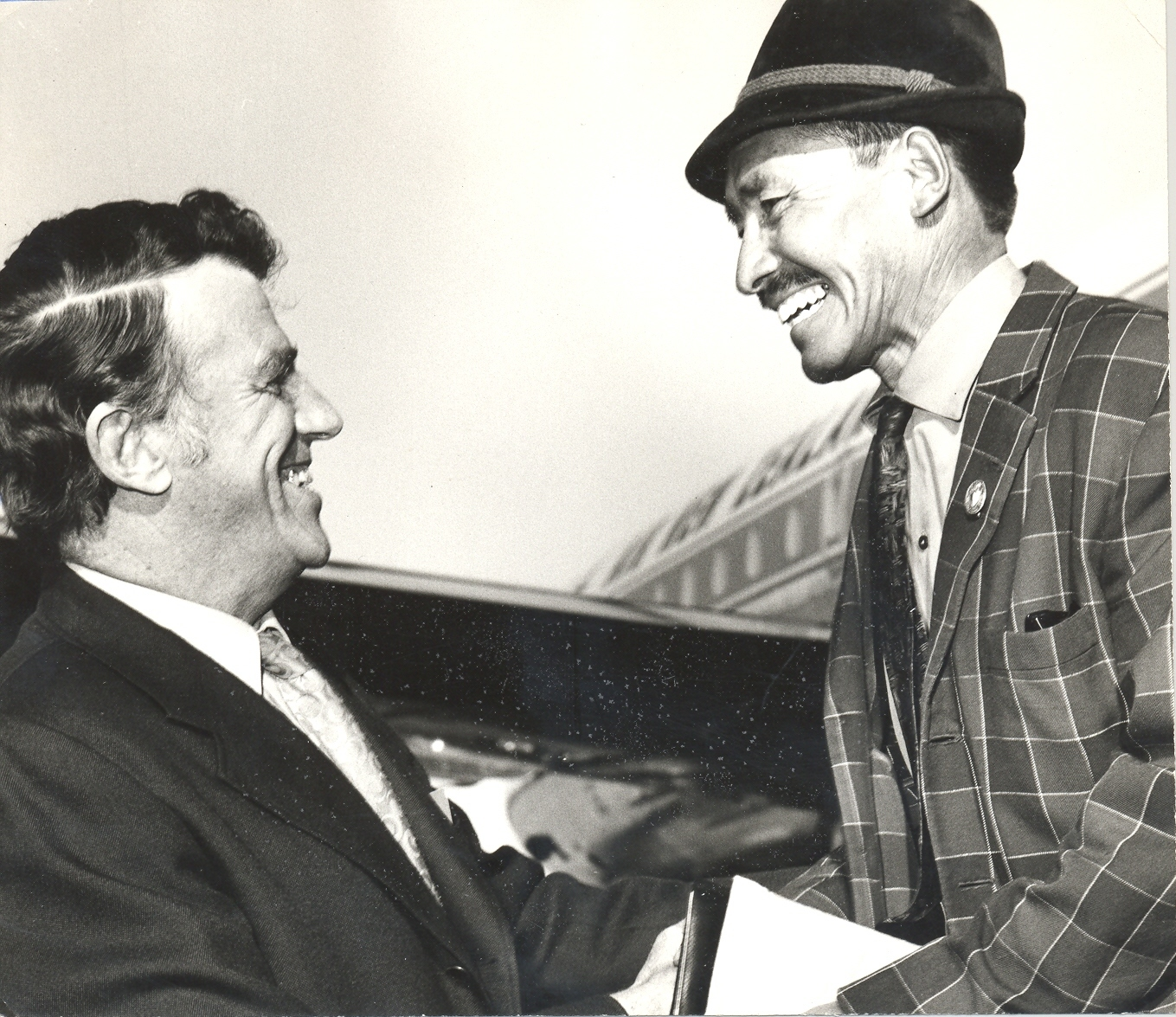
Sir Edmund Hillary greets Tenzing Norgay, c. 1971.

They spent only about 15 minutes at the summit. Hillary took the famous photo of Norgay posing with his ice-axe, but since Norgay had never used a camera, Hillary's ascent went unrecorded. However, according to Norgay's autobiography Man of Everest, when Norgay offered to take Hillary's photograph Hillary declined—"I motioned to Hillary that I would now take his picture. But for some reason he shook his head; he did not want it." Additional photos were taken looking down the mountain, in order to confirm that they had made it to the top and to document that the ascent was not faked. The two had to take care on the descent after discovering that drifting snow had covered their tracks, complicating the task of retracing their steps. The first person they met was Lowe, who had climbed up to meet them with hot soup.

Afterwards, Norgay was met with great adulation in Nepal and India. Hillary and Hunt were knighted by Queen Elizabeth II, while Norgay received the George Medal for his efforts on the expedition. Norgay was not eligible for a knighthood as he was not a British subject. Nevertheless, there have been suggestions of iniquity such as a claim that Indian prime minister Jawaharlal Nehru refused permission for Norgay to be knighted.

It has been a long road ... From a mountain coolie, a bearer of loads, to a wearer of a coat with rows of medals who is carried about in planes and worries about income tax.

— Tenzing Norgay

National Geographic said,

"Hillary was knighted for being the first known person to climb to the top of Mount Everest. But Tenzing, who simultaneously reached its summit, only received an honorary medal. In the years since there's been growing disquiet at the lack of official recognition."

Norgay and Hillary were the first people to conclusively set foot on the summit of Mount Everest, but journalists were persistently repeating the question: "Which of the two men had the right to the glory of being the first one, and who was merely the second, the follower?" Colonel Hunt, the expedition leader, declared, "They reached it together, as a team."

Norgay eventually ended the speculation by revealing that Hillary was first in his 1955 autobiography. It was ghost-written by American writer James Ramsay Ullman as Tenzing could speak several languages but could not read or write. They were roped six feet apart, with most of the 30 foot rope in loops in his hand:

A little below the summit Hillary and I stopped. ... I was not thinking of 'first' and 'second'. I did not say to myself, there is a golden apple up there. I will push Hillary aside and run for it. We went on slowly, steadily. And then we were there. Hillary stepped on top first. And I stepped up after him ... Now the truth is told. And I am ready to be judged by it.

== After Everest ==
Tenzing Norgay became the first Director of Field Training of the Himalayan Mountaineering Institute in Darjeeling, when it was set up in 1954.

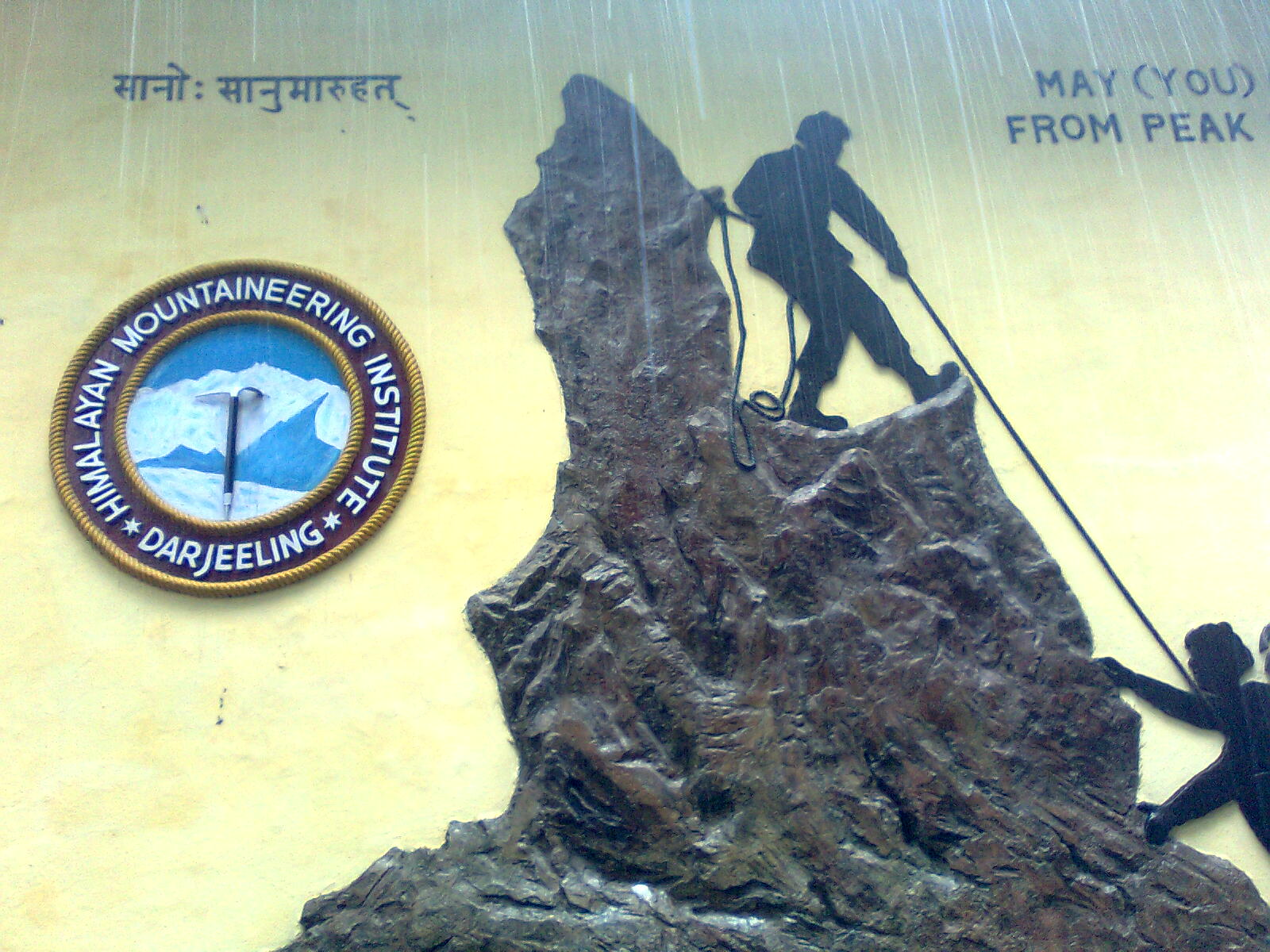
May (you) climb from peak to peak

In January 1975, with permission of the King of Bhutan, Jigme Singye Wangchuck, Norgay served as sirdar (guide) for the first American tourist party allowed into the country. Brought together by a company then called Mountain Travel (now called Mountain Travel-Sobek), the group first met Norgay in India before beginning the trek. The official trek began in Paro, northern Bhutan and included a visit to Tiger's Nest (Paro Taktsang), the ancient Buddhist monastery, before returning to India via Nepal and Sikkim. Norgay even introduced his group to the King of Sikkim (the last king of Sikkim, as Sikkim is now a part of India) and also brought them to his home in India for a farewell celebration.

In 1978 Norgay founded Tenzing Norgay Adventures, a company providing trekking adventures in the Himalayas. As of 2021, the company was run by his son Jamling Tenzing Norgay, who himself reached the summit of Everest in 1996.

On 10 May 1984 Tenzing Norgay, together with Grp Capt A. J. S. Grewal, Principal of the Himalayan Mountaineering Institute, attended the 10th-anniversary celebrations of The School of Adventure, Mysore, Karnataka held at the Mysore Institution of Engineers' auditorium.

== Honours ==
In 1938, after Norgay's third Everest expedition as a porter, the Himalayan Club awarded him its Tiger Medal for high-altitude work.

On 7 June 1953, it was announced that the newly crowned Queen Elizabeth II wished to recognize Norgay's achievements. 10 Downing Street announced on 1 July that, following consultation with the governments of India and Nepal, the Queen had approved awarding Norgay the George Medal (GM). He also received later that year, along with the rest of the Everest party, the Queen Elizabeth II Coronation Medal, bearing the additional inscription 'Mount Everest Expedition'. In May 2013, Norgay's grandson, Tashi Tenzing, said he believed his grandfather should have been knighted, not just given "a bloody medal".

King Tribhuvan of Nepal awarded Norgay the distinction of Member 1st Class of the Order of the Star of Nepal (Supradipta‑Manyabara‑Nepal‑Tara) in 1953.

In 1959, the Government of India awarded him the Padma Bhushan, the third-highest civilian award of India. Indian Mountaineering Foundation presented him with its gold medal.

On 1 March 1963, Norgay was awarded the honorary title of "Merited Master of Sport of the USSR" by the Soviet Union, becoming the first foreigner to receive this distinction.

== Personal life and death ==
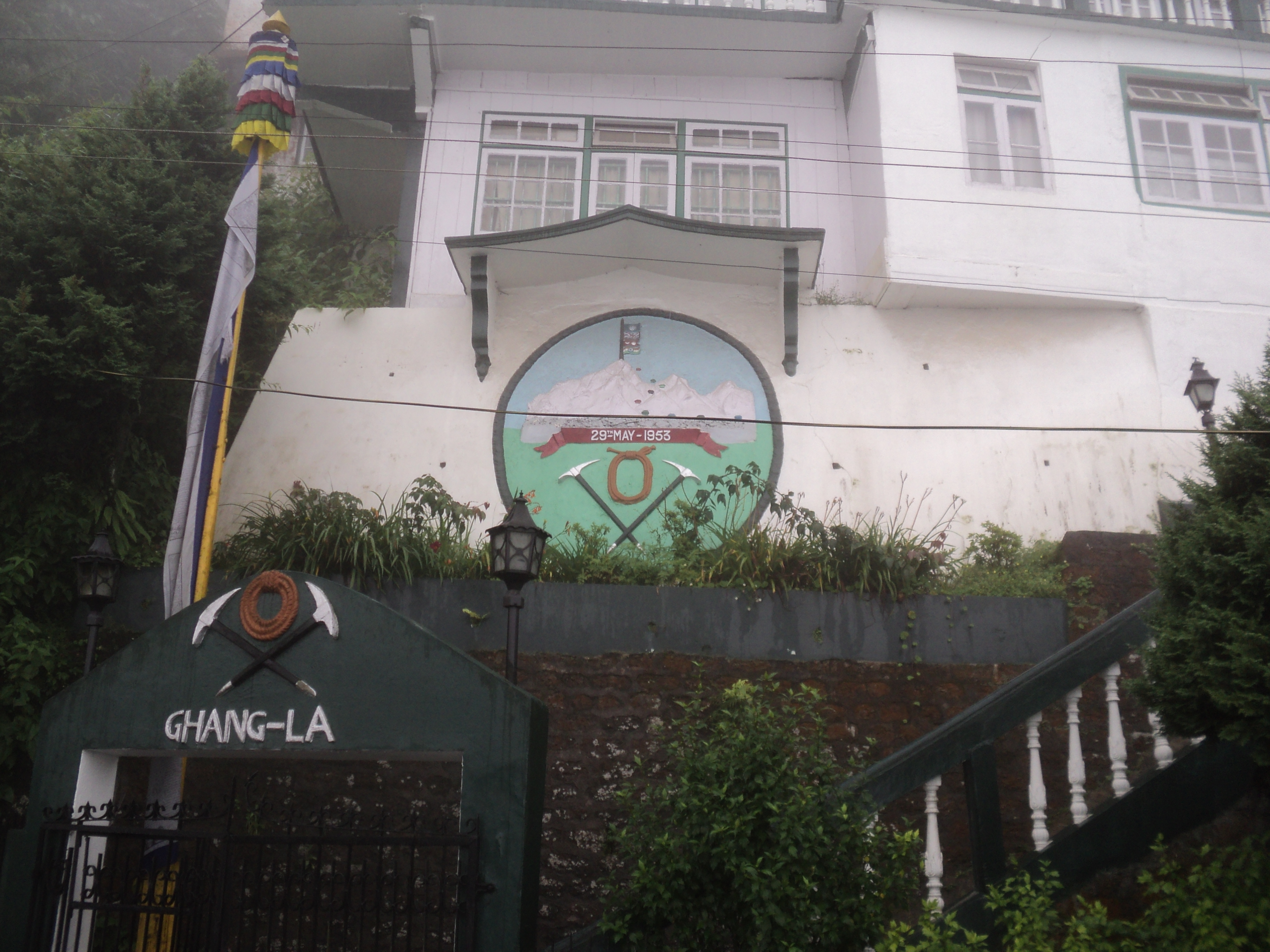
The house in Darjeeling where Norgay spent his last years

Norgay was married three times. His first wife, Dawa Phuti, died young in 1944. They had a son, Nima Dorje, who died at the age of four, and two daughters: Pem Pem, whose son, Tashi Tenzing, climbed Everest, and Nima.

Norgay's second wife was Ang Lahmu, a cousin of his first wife. They had no biological children, but she was adoptive mother to their daughters from his earlier marriage with her cousin.

His third wife was Dakku, whom he married while his second wife was still alive, as allowed by Sherpa custom (see polygyny). They had three sons (Norbu, Jamling and Dhamey), and one daughter, Deki, who married American lawyer Clark Trainor. Jamling would join Peter Hillary, Edmund Hillary's son, in climbing Everest in 2003 on the 50th anniversary of their fathers' climb.

Other relatives include Norgay's nephews, Nawang Gombu and Topgay, who took part in the 1953 Everest expedition; and his grandsons, Tashi Tenzing, who lives in Sydney, Australia, and the Trainor grandsons: Tenzing, Kalden, and Yonden. Tenzing Trainor is an actor who appeared in the 2019 Dreamworks Animation film Abominable.

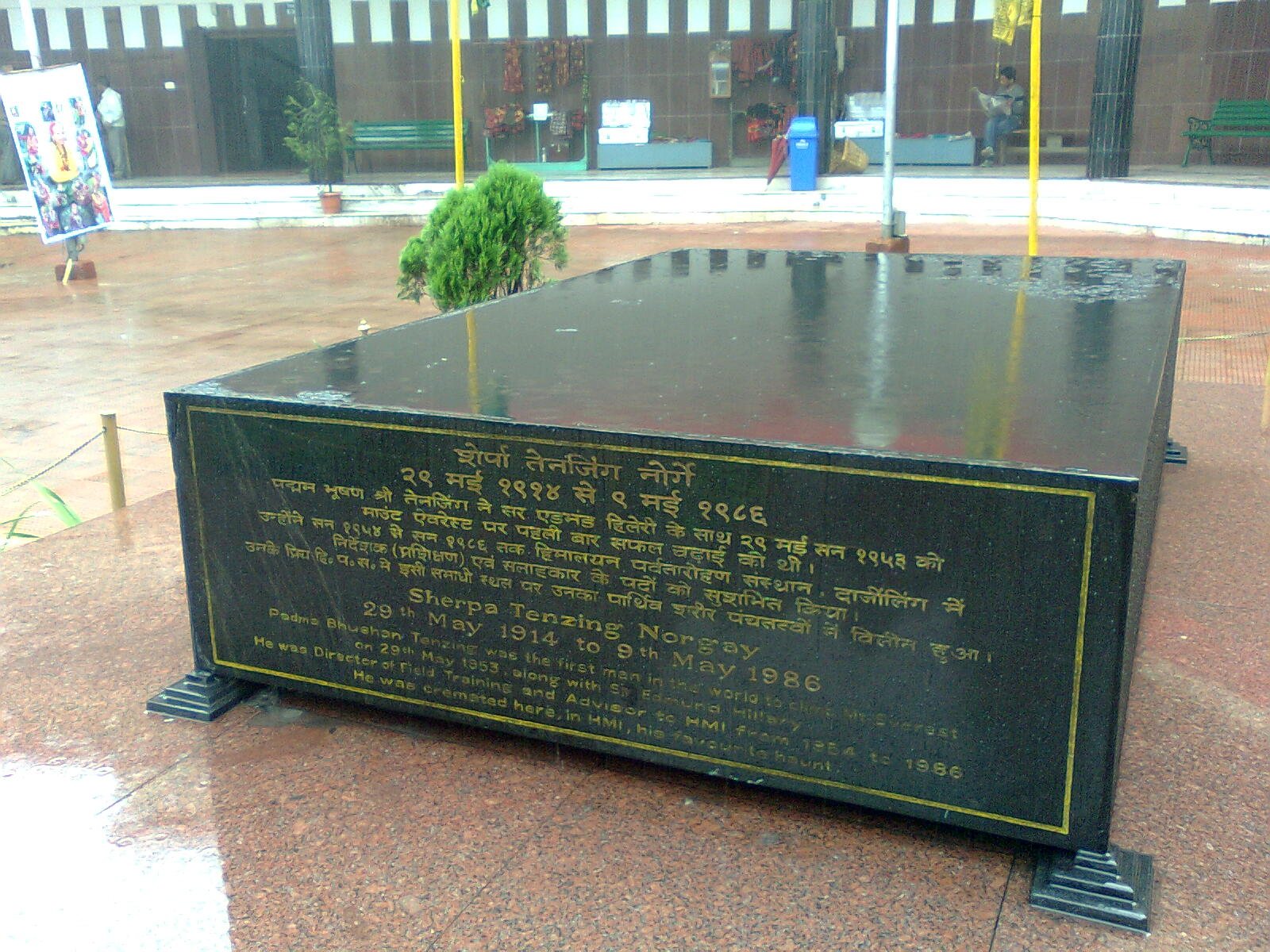
Tenzing Norgay memorial

Norgay died of a cerebral hemorrhage in Darjeeling, West Bengal, India, on 9 May 1986 at the age of 71. His remains were cremated in the Himalayan Mountaineering Institute, Darjeeling, his favourite haunt. His widow, Dakku, died in 1992.

== Legacy ==
=== Awards ===
- In 2003, commemorating the golden jubilee of Norgay's summit of Everest, the Indian government renamed its highest adventure sports award, the Tenzing Norgay National Adventure Award after him.

=== Art, entertainment and media ===
==== Literature ====
- In 2011, Indian comic publisher Amar Chitra Katha released a children's comic book about Tenzing Norgay.

==== Film ====
- In Intolerable Cruelty, the 2003 American film by the Coen brothers, Norgay is mentioned by the film's main character in creating a metaphor for the positive act of enabling or empowering another.
- Filming on Tenzing began in 2025, with Genden Phuntsok portraying Tenzing, Tom Hiddleston as Hillary and Willem Dafoe as John Hunt. It premiered at the Telluride Film Festival on September 4, 2026.

=== Places ===
- One of the buildings at Everest Court, Mottingham in Kent, England is named after him.
- In January 2008, Lukla Airport was renamed Tenzing–Hillary Airport in honour of the pair and their achievement.
- Since 1994, the 4.5‑km‑wide minor planet 6481 Tenzing has been named in his honour.
- In September 2013, the Government of Nepal proposed naming a 7,916-metre (25,971 ft) mountain in Nepal Tenzing Peak in Norgay's honour. Both Tenzing Peak and Hillary Peak are points on the long Ridge from Cho Oyu to Gyuchung Kang with Tenzing Peak nearer to Cho Oyu.
- In July 2015, the highest-known mountain range on the dwarf planet Pluto was named Tenzing Montes.

=== Animals ===
- Red pandas at several zoos are named in his honour.

=== Consumer goods ===
- The energy drink brand Tenzing is named in his honour.

== See also ==
Relatives of Tenzing Norgay:

- Nawang Gombu Sherpa (nephew)
- Lobsang Tshering (nephew)
- Jamling Tenzing Norgay (son)
- Tashi Tenzing (grandson)
- Tenzing Norgay Trainor (grandson)
